= List of moths of Sierra Leone =

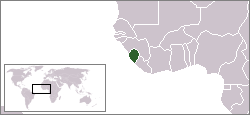
Location of Sierra Leone

There are about 760 known moth species of Sierra Leone. The moths (mostly nocturnal) and butterflies (mostly diurnal) together make up the taxonomic order Lepidoptera.

This is a list of moth species which have been recorded in Sierra Leone.

== Adelidae ==
- Nemophora parvella (Walker, 1863)

== Anomoeotidae ==
- Anomoeotes leucolena Holland, 1893
- Anomoeotes tenellula Holland, 1893
- Anomoeotes triangularis Jordan, 1907

== Arctiidae ==
- Acantharctia mundata (Walker, 1865)
- Afraloa bifurca (Walker, 1855)
- Afrasura hyporhoda (Hampson, 1900)
- Afrasura obliterata (Walker, 1864)
- Afrowatsonius marginalis (Walker, 1855)
- Alpenus investigatorum (Karsch, 1898)
- Alpenus maculosa (Stoll, 1781)
- Amata basithyris Hampson, 1914
- Amata divalis (Schaus & Clements, 1893)
- Amata francisca (Butler, 1876)
- Amata marina (Butler, 1876)
- Amata tomasina (Butler, 1876)
- Amerila brunnea (Hampson, 1901)
- Amerila leucoptera (Hampson, 1901)
- Amerila luteibarba (Hampson, 1901)
- Amerila puella (Fabricius, 1793)
- Amerila vidua (Cramer, 1780)
- Amerila vitrea Plötz, 1880
- Amsacta latimarginalis Rothschild, 1933
- Amsacta marginalis Walker, 1855
- Anapisa preussi (Gaede, 1926)
- Anapisa tristigma (Mabille, 1893)
- Apisa canescens Walker, 1855
- Argina leonina (Walker, 1865)
- Asura atricraspeda Hampson, 1914
- Balacra caeruleifascia Walker, 1856
- Balacra humphreyi Rothschild, 1912
- Binna penicillata Walker, 1865
- Binna scita (Walker, 1865)
- Caripodia albescens (Hampson, 1907)
- Caripodia metaleuca Hampson, 1900
- Caryatis phileta (Drury, 1782)
- Caryatis syntomina Butler, 1878
- Ceryx albimacula (Walker, 1854)
- Creatonotos leucanioides Holland, 1893
- Cyana basisticta (Hampson, 1914)
- Cyana delicata (Walker, 1854)
- Cyana rejecta (Walker, 1854)
- Cyana trigutta (Walker, 1854)
- Disparctia vittata (Druce, 1898)
- Eilema albidula (Walker, 1864)
- Eilema apicalis (Walker, 1862)
- Eilema monochroma (Holland, 1893)
- Epilacydes scita (Walker, 1865)
- Estigmene flaviceps Hampson, 1907
- Estigmene ochreomarginata Bethune-Baker, 1909
- Estigmene unilinea Rothschild, 1910
- Euchromia folletii (Guérin-Méneville, 1832)
- Euchromia guineensis (Fabricius, 1775)
- Euchromia hampsoni Seitz, 1926
- Euchromia lethe (Fabricius, 1775)
- Meganaclia perpusilla (Walker, 1856)
- Meganaclia sippia (Plötz, 1880)
- Metarctia burra (Schaus & Clements, 1893)
- Myopsyche makomensis Strand, 1912
- Myopsyche notoplagia Hampson, 1898
- Neuroxena flammea (Schaus, 1893)
- Nyctemera acraeina Druce, 1882
- Nyctemera apicalis (Walker, 1854)
- Nyctemera perspicua (Walker, 1854)
- Nyctemera xanthura (Plötz, 1880)
- Oedaleosia nigricosta Hampson, 1900
- Palaeosiccia punctata Hampson, 1900
- Paralpenus flavicosta (Hampson, 1909)
- Phryganopsis cinerella (Wallengren, 1860)
- Phryganopsis flavicosta Hampson, 1901
- Pseudlepista flavicosta Hampson, 1910
- Pseudothyretes perpusilla (Walker, 1856)
- Pusiola celida (Bethune-Baker, 1911)
- Radiarctia lutescens (Walker, 1854)
- Rhipidarctia invaria (Walker, 1856)
- Siccia cretata Hampson, 1914
- Siccia paucipuncta Hampson, 1918
- Spilosoma affinis Bartel, 1903
- Spilosoma aurantiaca (Holland, 1893)
- Spilosoma batesi (Rothschild, 1910)
- Spilosoma curvilinea Walker, 1855
- Spilosoma immaculata Bartel, 1903
- Spilosoma occidens (Rothschild, 1910)
- Spilosoma quadrilunata (Hampson, 1901)
- Stenarctia abdominalis Rothschild, 1910
- Thyretes negus Oberthür, 1878
- Trichaeta bivittata (Walker, 1864)

== Brachodidae ==
- Nigilgia adjectella (Walker, 1863)
- Dactyloceras lucina (Drury, 1872)

== Cossidae ==
- Phragmataecia fuscifusa Hampson, 1910
- Xyleutes lunifera (Hampson, 1910)

== Crambidae ==
- Aethaloessa floridalis (Zeller, 1852)
- Anania epipaschialis (Hampson, 1912)
- Anania fusalis (Hampson, 1912)
- Bissetia leucomeralis (Hampson, 1919)
- Charltona albidalis Hampson, 1919
- Chilo mesoplagalis (Hampson, 1919)
- Cirrhochrista saltusalis Schaus & Clements, 1893
- Cnaphalocrocis trapezalis (Guenée, 1854)
- Conotalis aurantifascia (Hampson, 1895)
- Cotachena smaragdina (Butler, 1875)
- Diptychophora minimalis Hampson, 1919
- Eporidia dariusalis Walker, 1859
- Euclasta varii Popescu-Gorj & Constantinescu, 1973
- Herpetogramma licarsisalis (Walker, 1859)
- Lamprosema leucographalis (Hampson, 1912)
- Lygropia amyntusalis (Walker, 1859)
- Mesolia microdontalis (Hampson, 1919)
- Metasia arida Hampson, 1913
- Obtusipalpis albidalis Hampson, 1919
- Orphanostigma fervidalis (Zeller, 1852)
- Palpita elealis (Walker, 1859)
- Patissa rufitinctalis Hampson, 1919
- Pediasia melanerges (Hampson, 1919)
- Phostria hesusalis (Walker, 1859)
- Phostria ledereralis (Strand, 1920)
- Phostria quadriguttata (Walker, 1869)
- Phryganodes biguttata Hampson, 1898
- Platytes duplicilinea (Hampson, 1919)
- Pseudocatharylla argenticilia (Hampson, 1919)
- Pycnarmon cribrata (Fabricius, 1794)
- Pycnarmon sexpunctalis (Hampson, 1912)
- Pycnarmon subpictalis (Hampson, 1912)
- Pyrausta approximalis (Guenée, 1854)
- Pyrausta phaenicealis (Hübner, 1818)
- Scirpophaga ochritinctalis (Hampson, 1919)
- Spoladea recurvalis (Fabricius, 1775)
- Stemorrhages sericea (Drury, 1773)
- Sufetula nigrescens Hampson, 1912
- Sufetula sufetuloides (Hampson, 1919)
- Syllepte leonalis (Schaus & Clements, 1893)
- Syllepte torsipex (Hampson, 1898)
- Zebronia phenice (Cramer, 1780)

== Drepanidae ==
- Epicampoptera strandi Bryk, 1913
- Gonoreta opacifinis Watson, 1965
- Gonoreta subtilis (Bryk, 1913)
- Isospidia brunneola (Holland, 1893)
- Negera confusa Walker, 1855
- Negera natalensis (Felder, 1874)
- Spidia fenestrata Butler, 1878
- Spidia planola Watson, 1965
- Spidia subviridis (Warren, 1899)

== Elachistidae ==
- Orophia melicoma (Meyrick, 1931)
- Orophia taurina (Meyrick, 1928)

== Eriocottidae ==
- Compsoctena ursulella (Walker, 1863)

== Eupterotidae ==
- Acrojana sciron (Druce, 1887)
- Acrojana simillima Rothschild, 1932
- Acrojana splendida Rothschild, 1917
- Camerunia orphne (Schaus, 1893)
- Drepanojana fasciata Aurivillius, 1893
- Hoplojana soricis Rothschild, 1917
- Jana eurymas Herrich-Schäffer, 1854
- Jana strigina Westwood, 1849
- Phiala cunina Cramer, 1780
- Phiala odites Schaus, 1893
- Phiala venusta (Walker, 1865)
- Stenoglene giganteus (Rothschild, 1917)
- Stenoglene nivalis (Rothschild, 1917)
- Stenoglene thelda (Druce, 1887)

== Gelechiidae ==
- Dichomeris eurynotus (Walsingham, 1897)
- Pectinophora gossypiella (Saunders, 1844)

== Geometridae ==
- Aletis helcita (Linnaeus, 1763)
- Allochrostes impunctata (Warren, 1897)
- Antitrygodes dentilinea Warren, 1897
- Apatadelpha biocellaria (Walker, 1863)
- Archichlora viridimacula Warren, 1898
- Bathycolpodes kabaria (Swinhoe, 1904)
- Bathycolpodes marginata (Warren, 1897)
- Biston abruptaria (Walker, 1869)
- Cartaletis gracilis (Möschler, 1887)
- Chiasmia conturbata (Warren, 1898)
- Chiasmia impar (Warren, 1897)
- Chiasmia ostentosaria (Möschler, 1887)
- Chiasmia rectistriaria (Herrich-Schäffer, 1854)
- Chiasmia streniata (Guenée, 1858)
- Chlorissa afflictaria (Swinhoe, 1904)
- Chlorissa malescripta (Warren, 1897)
- Chloroclystis sierraria Swinhoe, 1904
- Chlorodrepana angustimargo Warren, 1901
- Coenina aurivena Butler, 1898
- Cyclophora leonaria (Walker, 1861)
- Derambila costipunctata Warren, 1905
- Derambila syllaria (Swinhoe, 1904)
- Epigynopteryx fimosa (Warren, 1905)
- Ereunetea minor (Holland, 1893)
- Eucrostes beatificata (Walker, 1863)
- Geodena bandajoma Swinhoe, 1904
- Geodena marginalis Walker, 1856
- Geodena quadrigutta Walker, 1856
- Geodena semihyalina Swinhoe, 1904
- Gonochlora minutaria Swinhoe, 1904
- Heterostegane pleninotata Warren, 1901
- Hyalornis docta (Schaus & Clements, 1893)
- Idaea macrostyla (Warren, 1900)
- Idaea pulveraria (Snellen, 1872)
- Idaea submaculata (Warren, 1898)
- Idiochlora approximans (Warren, 1897)
- Larentia attenuata (Walker, 1862)
- Lophorrhachia palliata (Warren, 1898)
- Melinoessa aureola Prout, 1934
- Melinoessa fulvata (Drury, 1773)
- Melinoessa perlimbata (Guenée, 1857)
- Melinoessa sodaliata (Walker, 1862)
- Mesocolpia marmorata (Warren, 1899)
- Mesothisa flaccida Warren, 1905
- Metallospora catori Warren, 1905
- Miantochora incolorata Warren, 1899
- Miantochora venerata (Mabille, 1879)
- Mimaletis albipennis Warren, 1905
- Narthecusa tenuiorata Walker, 1862
- Neostega flaviguttata Warren, 1903
- Oxyfidonia fulvida Warren, 1905
- Oxyfidonia insolita (Warren, 1905)
- Paramilionia rubroplagata Bethune-Baker, 1906
- Perithalera oblongata (Warren, 1898)
- Pingasa rhadamaria (Guenée, 1858)
- Pingasa ruginaria (Guenée, 1858)
- Pitthea continua Walker, 1854
- Pitthea famula Drury, 1773
- Pitthea rubriplaga Warren, 1897
- Plegapteryx anomalus Herrich-Schäffer, 1856
- Problepsis digammata Kirby, 1896
- Problepsis flavistigma Swinhoe, 1904
- Problepsis ochripicta Warren, 1901
- Scopula cervinata (Warren, 1905)
- Scopula inscriptata (Walker, 1863)
- Scopula lactaria (Walker, 1861)
- Scopula laevipennis (Warren, 1897)
- Scopula minorata (Boisduval, 1833)
- Scopula natalica (Butler, 1875)
- Scopula ossicolor (Warren, 1897)
- Scopula planipennis (Warren, 1900)
- Scopula pseudophema Prout, 1920
- Scopula serena Prout, 1920
- Somatina impunctulata (Warren, 1901)
- Somatina nucleata Warren, 1905
- Somatina subviridata Warren, 1901
- Somatina virginalis Prout, 1917
- Terina renifera Warren, 1897
- Terina subfulva (Warren, 1905)
- Thalassodes dentatilinea Prout, 1912
- Thenopa nigraria (Swinhoe, 1904)
- Thetidia undulilinea (Warren, 1905)
- Traminda obversata (Walker, 1861)
- Unnamed genus Ennominae penumbrata (Warren, 1905)
- Xenochroma salsa (Warren, 1897)
- Xenostega tincta Warren, 1899
- Zamarada acrochra Prout, 1928
- Zamarada adumbrata D. S. Fletcher, 1974
- Zamarada amymone Prout, 1934
- Zamarada bicuspida D. S. Fletcher, 1974
- Zamarada clementi Herbulot, 1975
- Zamarada corroborata Herbulot, 1954
- Zamarada cydippe Herbulot, 1954
- Zamarada dilucida Warren, 1909
- Zamarada eucharis (Drury, 1782)
- Zamarada euerces Prout, 1928
- Zamarada euphrosyne Oberthür, 1912
- Zamarada flavicosta Warren, 1897
- Zamarada ilaria Swinhoe, 1904
- Zamarada indicata D. S. Fletcher, 1974
- Zamarada ixiaria Swinhoe, 1904
- Zamarada labifera Prout, 1915
- Zamarada leona Gaede, 1915
- Zamarada lepta D. S. Fletcher, 1974
- Zamarada melanopyga Herbulot, 1954
- Zamarada melpomene Oberthür, 1912
- Zamarada mimesis D. S. Fletcher, 1974
- Zamarada nasuta Warren, 1897
- Zamarada perlepidata (Walker, 1863)
- Zamarada platycephala D. S. Fletcher, 1974
- Zamarada protrusa Warren, 1897
- Zamarada reflexaria (Walker, 1863)
- Zamarada regularis D. S. Fletcher, 1974
- Zamarada sicula D. S. Fletcher, 1974
- Zamarada subinterrupta Gaede, 1915
- Zamarada vulpina Warren, 1897

== Glyphipterigidae ==
- Glyphipterix gemmatella (Walker, 1864)

== Gracillariidae ==
- Acrocercops eurhythmopa Meyrick, 1934
- Acrocercops leucostega (Meyrick, 1932)
- Acrocercops siphonaula Meyrick, 1931
- Spulerina hexalocha (Meyrick, 1912)

== Himantopteridae ==
- Pseudothymara staudingeri (Rogenhofer, 1888)

== Hyblaeidae ==
- Hyblaea tenuis Walker, 1866

== Immidae ==
- Imma acroptila Meyrick, 1906

== Lasiocampidae ==
- Cheligium lineatum (Aurivillius, 1893)
- Chrysopsyche mirifica (Butler, 1878)
- Cleopatrina bilinea (Walker, 1855)
- Eucraera magna (Aurivillius, 1908)
- Filiola dogma Zolotuhin & Gurkovich, 2009
- Filiola fulgurata (Aurivillius, 1909)
- Filiola lanceolata (Hering, 1932)
- Gelo calcarales Zolotuhin & Prozorov, 2010
- Gonometa nysa Druce, 1887
- Gonopacha brotoessa (Holland, 1893)
- Lechriolepis citrina Schaus, 1897
- Lechriolepis heres Schaus, 1912
- Leipoxais directa (Walker, 1865)
- Leipoxais marginepunctata Holland, 1893
- Mimopacha cinerascens (Holland, 1893)
- Morongea lampara Zolotuhin & Prozorov, 2010
- Morongea mastodont Zolotuhin & Prozorov, 2010
- Odontocheilopteryx conzolia Gurkovich & Zolotuhin, 2009
- Oplometa cassandra (Druce, 1887)
- Philotherma sordida Aurivillius, 1905
- Schausinna clementsi (Schaus, 1897)
- Stenophatna dentata (Aurivillius, 1899)
- Stoermeriana basale (Walker, 1855)
- Stoermeriana cervina (Aurivillius, 1927)
- Streblote postalbidum Schaus
- Streblote splendens (Druce, 1887)

== Limacodidae ==
- Altha rubrifusalis Hampson, 1910
- Brachiopsis conjunctoides Hering, 1933
- Cosuma rugosa Walker, 1855
- Latoia canescens (Walker, 1855)
- Latoia picta (Walker, 1855)
- Miresa gliricidiae Hering, 1933
- Natada desperata Hering, 1928
- Niphadolepis seleniphora Hering, 1933
- Parasa semiochracea Hering, 1933
- Susica molybdea Hampson, 1910
- Trachyptena nigromaculata Hering, 1928
- Zinara ploetzi Schaus & Clements, 1893

== Lymantriidae ==
- Aroa danva Schaus & Clements, 1893
- Aroa leonensis Hampson, 1910
- Batella lampra (Hering, 1926)
- Batella muscosa (Holland, 1893)
- Conigephyra discolepia (Hampson, 1910)
- Crorema mentiens Walker, 1855
- Dasychira bacchans (Karsch, 1898)
- Dasychira citana (Schaus & Clements, 1893)
- Dasychira goodii (Holland, 1893)
- Dasychira leucogramma Hampson, 1910
- Dasychira lulua Collenette, 1937
- Dasychira robusta (Walker, 1855)
- Dasychira suspecta Hering, 1926
- Dasychira thermoplaga Hampson, 1910
- Dasychira ticana Schaus & Clements, 1893
- Eudasychira georgiana (Fawcett, 1900)
- Euproctis conizona Collenette, 1933
- Euproctis consocia Walker, 1865
- Euproctis discipuncta (Holland, 1893)
- Euproctis pygmaea (Walker, 1855)
- Griveaudyria ila (Swinhoe, 1904)
- Heteronygmia manicata (Aurivillius, 1892)
- Knappetra fasciata (Walker, 1855)
- Laelia dochmia Collenette, 1960
- Laelia eutricha Collenette, 1931
- Laelia fracta Schaus & Clements, 1893
- Laelia rosea Schaus & Clements, 1893
- Laelia subrosea (Walker, 1855)
- Leucoma luteipes (Walker, 1855)
- Marbla divisa (Walker, 1855)
- Marblepsis flabellaria (Fabricius, 1787)
- Naroma signifera Walker, 1856
- Naroma varipes (Walker, 1865)
- Neomardara africana (Holland, 1893)
- Olene basalis (Walker, 1855)
- Otroeda aino (Bryk, 1915)
- Otroeda cafra (Drury, 1780)
- Otroeda hesperia (Cramer, 1779)
- Otroeda nerina (Drury, 1780)
- Paqueta chloroscia (Hering, 1926)
- Paramarbla indentata (Holland, 1893)
- Pseudostracilla infausta Hering, 1926
- Rahona ladburyi (Bethune-Baker, 1911)
- Somatoxena lasea (Druce, 1899)

== Metarbelidae ==
- Haberlandia rabiusi Lehmann, 2011
- Melisomimas metallica Hampson, 1914
- Ortharbela obliquifascia (Hampson, 1910)
- Paralebedella schultzei (Aurivillius, 1905)
- Salagena transversa Walker, 1865
- Teragra angulifascia Gaede, 1929
- Teragra umbrifera Hampson, 1910

== Noctuidae ==
- Achaea albicilia (Walker, 1858)
- Achaea albifimbria (Walker, 1869)
- Achaea boris (Geyer, 1837)
- Achaea catocaloides Guenée, 1852
- Achaea echo (Walker, 1858)
- Achaea ezea (Cramer, 1779)
- Achaea faber Holland, 1894
- Achaea finita (Guenée, 1852)
- Achaea illustrata Walker, 1858
- Achaea indicabilis Walker, 1858
- Achaea intercisa Walker, 1865
- Achaea lienardi (Boisduval, 1833)
- Achaea occidens (Hampson, 1913)
- Acontia citrelinea Bethune-Baker, 1911
- Acontia glaphyra Holland, 1894
- Acontia hemiselenias (Hampson, 1918)
- Acontia insocia (Walker, 1857)
- Acrapex spoliata (Walker, 1863)
- Agoma trimenii (Felder, 1874)
- Agrotis talda (Schaus & Clements, 1893)
- Amblyprora magnifica (Schaus & Clements, 1893)
- Amyna axis Guenée, 1852
- Anachrostis metaphaea Hampson, 1926
- Anigraea siccata (Hampson, 1905)
- Anomis fulvida Guenée, 1852
- Anomis leona (Schaus & Clements, 1893)
- Araeopteron canescens (Walker, 1865)
- Araeopteron griseata Hampson, 1907
- Argyrogramma signata (Fabricius, 1775)
- Asota speciosa (Drury, 1773)
- Aspidifrontia hemileuca (Hampson, 1909)
- Athyrma discimacula Hampson, 1926
- Audea endophaea Hampson, 1913
- Authadistis nyctichroa Hampson, 1926
- Autoba brachygonia (Hampson, 1910)
- Avitta atripuncta Hampson, 1926
- Blasticorhinus trichopoda Hampson, 1926
- Brithodes bathisalis (Walker, 1859)
- Caligatus angasii Wing, 1850
- Callopistria maillardi (Guenée, 1862)
- Campydelta campyla (Hampson, 1909)
- Cerynea trichobasis Hampson, 1910
- Condica pauperata (Walker, 1858)
- Cophanta occidentalis Hampson, 1910
- Crameria amabilis (Drury, 1773)
- Cretonia platyphaeella Walker, 1866
- Cyligramma amblyops Mabille, 1891
- Cyligramma fluctuosa (Drury, 1773)
- Cyligramma limacina (Guérin-Méneville, 1832)
- Dysgonia abnegans (Walker, 1858)
- Dysgonia conjunctura (Walker, 1858)
- Dysgonia humilis Holland, 1894
- Dysgonia multilineata (Holland, 1894)
- Dysgonia palpalis (Walker, 1865)
- Dysgonia torrida (Guenée, 1852)
- Dysgonia trogosema (Hampson, 1913)
- Elaphria plectilis (Guenée, 1852)
- Entomogramma pardus Guenée, 1852
- Episparis fenestrifera Bryk, 1915
- Episparis gomphiona Hampson, 1926
- Ercheia subsignata (Walker, 1865)
- Ericeia congregata (Walker, 1858)
- Eublemma albicosta Hampson, 1910
- Eublemma apicipunctum (Saalmüller, 1891)
- Eublemma carneotincta Hampson, 1910
- Eublemma colla (Schaus, 1893)
- Eublemma exigua (Walker, 1858)
- Eublemma ochrochroa Hampson, 1910
- Eublemma orthogramma (Snellen, 1872)
- Eublemma sciaphora Hampson, 1910
- Eudrapa basipunctum Walker, 1858
- Eutelia melanopis Hampson, 1905
- Eutelia nigridentula Hampson, 1905
- Eutelia snelleni Saalmüller, 1881
- Eutelia subrubens (Mabille, 1890)
- Feliniopsis africana (Schaus & Clements, 1893)
- Feliniopsis gueneei (Laporte, 1973)
- Feliniopsis thoracica (Walker, 1858)
- Gesonia obeditalis Walker, 1859
- Grammodes stolida (Fabricius, 1775)
- Helicoverpa assulta (Guenée, 1852)
- Heliophisma catocalina Holland, 1894
- Heliophisma klugii (Boisduval, 1833)
- Heliophisma xanthoptera (Hampson, 1910)
- Heraclia catori (Jordan, 1904)
- Heraclia geryon (Fabricius, 1781)
- Heraclia hornimani (Druce, 1880)
- Heraclia pallida (Walker, 1854)
- Heraclia terminatis (Walker, 1856)
- Holocryptis melanosticta Hampson, 1910
- Holocryptis permaculata Hampson, 1910
- Hydrillodes janalis Schaus & Clements, 1893
- Hypena ducalis Schaus & Clemens, 1893
- Hypena saltalis Schaus & Clemens, 1893
- Hypena laceratalis Walker, 1859
- Hypena obacerralis Walker, [1859]
- Hypocala tenuis Walker, 1866
- Hypopyra capensis Herrich-Schäffer, 1854
- Hyposada hydrocampata (Guenée, 1858)
- Hyposada juncturalis (Walker, 1866)
- Ilyrgis ethiopica Hampson, 1926
- Leoniloma convergens Hampson, 1926
- Leucania insulicola Guenée, 1852
- Libystica crenata Hampson, 1926
- Libystica eucampima Hampson, 1926
- Lithacodia blandula (Guenée, 1862)
- Lophiophora purpurata (Hampson, 1926)
- Lophoptera litigiosa (Boisduval, 1833)
- Marcipa secticona Hampson, 1926
- Marcipa talusina (Schaus & Clements, 1893)
- Massaga hesparia (Cramer, 1775)
- Massaga maritona Butler, 1868
- Maxera nigriceps (Walker, 1858)
- Melionica bertha (Schaus, 1893)
- Metagarista aziyade Vuillot, 1892
- Metagarista maenas (Herrich-Schäffer, 1853)
- Metagarista triphaenoides Walker, 1854
- Mimasura asticta Hampson, 1910
- Mimasura disticta Hampson, 1910
- Miniodes discolor Guenée, 1852
- Miniodes phaeosoma Hampson, 1913
- Mitrophrys magna (Walker, 1854)
- Mitrophrys menete (Cramer, 1775)
- Mocis conveniens (Walker, 1858)
- Mocis mayeri (Boisduval, 1833)
- Neostichtis nigricostata (Hampson, 1908)
- Oglasa holophaea Hampson, 1926
- Ophiusa conspicienda (Walker, 1858)
- Ophiusa dilecta Walker, 1865
- Ophiusa rufescens (Hampson, 1913)
- Oruza latifera (Walker, 1869)
- Orygmophora mediofoveata Hampson, 1926
- Pangrapta eucraspeda Hampson, 1926
- Pangrapta seriopuncta Hampson, 1926
- Panilla hadrastis Hampson, 1926
- Parachalciope benitensis (Holland, 1894)
- Parachalciope euclidicola (Walker, 1858)
- Parafodina ectrogia (Hampson, 1926)
- Paralephana consocia Hampson, 1926
- Paralephana costisignata Hampson, 1926
- Phytometra duplicalis (Walker, 1866)
- Phytometra silona (Schaus & Clements, 1893)
- Plecoptera leucosticha Hampson, 1926
- Plecopterodes moderata (Wallengren, 1860)
- Polytelodes florifera (Walker, 1858)
- Pseudoarcte melanis (Mabille, 1890)
- Pseudogiria hypographa (Hampson, 1926)
- Rhesala moestalis (Walker, 1866)
- Rivula craspisticta Hampson, 1926
- Schausia gladiatoria (Holland, 1893)
- Schausia leona (Schaus, 1893)
- Soloe trigutta Walker, 1854
- Spodoptera cilium Guenée, 1852
- Spodoptera exempta (Walker, 1857)
- Spodoptera mauritia (Boisduval, 1833)
- Spodoptera triturata (Walker, 1857)
- Tavia nyctombra Hampson, 1926
- Tavia polycyma Hampson, 1926
- Thiacidas schausi (Hampson, 1905)
- Toana acidalica Hampson, 1910
- Tolna sypnoides (Butler, 1878)
- Tolna versicolor Walker, 1869
- Trigonodes hyppasia (Cramer, 1779)
- Ugia rufilinea Hampson, 1926
- Uripao albizonata Hampson, 1926

== Nolidae ==
- Arcyophora polla (Schaus, 1893)
- Blenina chloromelana (Mabille, 1890)
- Blenina miota Hampson, 1905
- Characoma miophora Hampson, 1912
- Earias biplaga Walker, 1866
- Earias cupreoviridis (Walker, 1862)
- Hesperothripa dicyma Hampson, 1912
- Leocyma camilla (Druce, 1887)
- Nanarhyncha nolophaea Hampson, 1918
- Negeta luminosa (Walker, 1858)
- Negeta mesoleuca (Holland, 1894)
- Neonegeta pollusca (Schaus, 1893)
- Nola flaviciliata (Hampson, 1901)
- Nola furvitincta (Hampson, 1914)
- Nola major Hampson, 1891
- Nola melanoscelis (Hampson, 1914)
- Nola transecta Hampson, 1901
- Pardasena minorella Walker, 1866
- Pardasena roeselioides (Walker, 1858)
- Pardoxia graellsii (Feisthamel, 1837)
- Selepa leucogonia (Hampson, 1905)
- Westermannia agrapha Hampson, 1905

== Notodontidae ==
- Afrocerura leonensis (Hampson, 1910)
- Amphiphalera leuconephra Hampson, 1910
- Antheua rufovittata (Aurivillius, 1901)
- Antheua simplex Walker, 1855
- Antheua trifasciata (Hampson, 1909)
- Antheua vittata (Walker, 1855)
- Atrasana rectilinea (Gaede, 1928)
- Brachychira elegans Aurivillius, 1907
- Catarctia divisa (Walker, 1855)
- Catarctia rothschildi (Kiriakoff, 1955)
- Desmeocraera albicans Gaede, 1928
- Desmeocraera bitioides (Holland, 1893)
- Diopeithes cyamina Kiriakoff, 1958
- Enomotarcha chloana (Holland, 1893)
- Epidonta brunneomixta (Mabille, 1897)
- Janthinisca flavipennis (Hampson, 1910)
- Lamoriodes metaleuca Hampson, 1910
- Odontoperas archonta Kiriakoff, 1959
- Rasemia citaria (Schaus, 1893)
- Rasemia macrodonta (Hampson, 1909)
- Scalmicauda molestula Kiriakoff, 1959
- Scrancia accipites (Schaus, 1893)
- Stauropussa chloe (Holland, 1893)
- Synete olivaceofusca (Rothschild, 1917)
- Tmetopteryx bisecta (Rothschild, 1917)
- Tricholoba atriclathrata Hampson, 1910
- Ulinella xylostola (Hampson, 1910)
- Utidaviana citana (Schaus, 1893)

== Oecophoridae ==
- Calliphractis phyllograpta Meyrick, 1928
- Epiphractis superciliaris Meyrick, 1930
- Stathmopoda auriferella (Walker, 1864)

== Psychidae ==
- Acanthopsyche sierricola (White, 1858)
- Eumeta cervina Druce, 1887
- Metisa aethiops (Hampson, 1910)

== Pterophoridae ==
- Megalorhipida leucodactylus (Fabricius, 1794)
- Pterophorus candidalis (Walker, 1864)

== Pyralidae ==
- Eldana saccharina Walker, 1865
- Endotricha niveifimbrialis Hampson, 1906
- Endotricha vinolentalis Ragonot, 1891
- Megalophota leonella Hampson, 1918
- Palmia adustalis Hampson, 1917
- Paraglossa zonalis Hampson, 1906

== Saturniidae ==
- Aurivillius arata (Westwood, 1849)
- Aurivillius triramis Rothschild, 1907
- Carnegia mirabilis (Aurivillius, 1895)
- Epiphora boolana Strand, 1909
- Holocerina angulata (Aurivillius, 1893)
- Imbrasia epimethea (Drury, 1772)
- Lobobunaea acetes (Westwood, 1849)
- Lobobunaea phaedusa (Drury, 1782)
- Micragone herilla (Westwood, 1849)
- Micragone nenia (Westwood, 1849)
- Nudaurelia alopia Westwood, 1849
- Nudaurelia eblis Strecker, 1876
- Nudaurelia jamesoni (Druce, 1890)
- Nudaurelia mitfordi (Kirby, 1892)
- Nudaurelia staudingeri Aurivillius, 1893
- Nudaurelia xanthomma (Rothschild, 1907)
- Pselaphelia gemmifera (Butler, 1878)
- Pseudobunaea alinda (Sonthonnax, 1899)

== Sesiidae ==
- Camaegeria exochiformis (Walker, 1856)
- Camaegeria monogama (Meyrick, 1932)
- Chamanthedon brillians (Beutenmüller, 1899)
- Chamanthedon striata Gaede, 1929
- Episannina zygaenura (Meyrick, 1933)
- Lepidopoda sylphina Hampson, 1919
- Lophoceps quinquepuncta Hampson, 1919
- Melittia chlorophila (Hering, 1935)
- Paranthrene anthrax Le Cerf, 1916
- Synanthedon rubripicta Hampson, 1919
- Tipulamima nigriceps Hampson, 1919
- Vespaegeria typica Strand, 1913

== Sphingidae ==
- Acanthosphinx guessfeldti (Dewitz, 1879)
- Acherontia atropos (Linnaeus, 1758)
- Antinephele achlora Holland, 1893
- Antinephele anomala (Butler, 1882)
- Antinephele lunulata Rothschild & Jordan, 1903
- Antinephele maculifera Holland, 1889
- Atemnora westermannii (Boisduval, 1875)
- Basiothia medea (Fabricius, 1781)
- Centroctena rutherfordi (Druce, 1882)
- Cephonodes hylas (Linnaeus, 1771)
- Chloroclanis virescens (Butler, 1882)
- Daphnis nerii (Linnaeus, 1758)
- Hippotion celerio (Linnaeus, 1758)
- Hippotion eson (Cramer, 1779)
- Hypaedalea butleri Rothschild, 1894
- Hypaedalea insignis Butler, 1877
- Leucostrophus commasiae (Walker, 1856)
- Macroglossum trochilus (Hübner, 1823)
- Macropoliana natalensis (Butler, 1875)
- Neopolyptychus pygarga (Karsch, 1891)
- Nephele accentifera (Palisot de Beauvois, 1821)
- Nephele funebris (Fabricius, 1793)
- Nephele oenopion (Hübner, [1824])
- Nephele peneus (Cramer, 1776)
- Nephele rectangulata Rothschild, 1895
- Nephele rosae Butler, 1875
- Phylloxiphia bicolor (Rothschild, 1894)
- Phylloxiphia formosa (Schultze, 1914)
- Phylloxiphia goodii (Holland, 1889)
- Phylloxiphia illustris (Rothschild & Jordan, 1906)
- Phylloxiphia oweni (Carcasson, 1968)
- Platysphinx phyllis Rothschild & Jordan, 1903
- Platysphinx vicaria Jordan, 1920
- Polyptychus affinis Rothschild & Jordan, 1903
- Polyptychus andosa Walker, 1856
- Polyptychus anochus Rothschild & Jordan, 1906
- Polyptychus carteri (Butler, 1882)
- Polyptychus nigriplaga Rothschild & Jordan, 1903
- Polyptychus orthographus Rothschild & Jordan, 1903
- Polyptychus retusus Rothschild & Jordan, 1908
- Pseudoclanis occidentalis Rothschild & Jordan, 1903
- Pseudoclanis postica (Walker, 1856)
- Pseudoclanis rhadamistus (Fabricius, 1781)
- Rufoclanis rosea (Druce, 1882)
- Temnora crenulata (Holland, 1893)
- Temnora eranga (Holland, 1889)
- Temnora funebris (Holland, 1893)
- Temnora iapygoides (Holland, 1889)
- Temnora plagiata Walker, 1856
- Temnora pseudopylas (Rothschild, 1894)
- Temnora sardanus (Walker, 1856)
- Temnora spiritus (Holland, 1893)
- Temnora stevensi Rothschild & Jordan, 1903
- Theretra jugurtha (Boisduval, 1875)
- Theretra orpheus (Herrich-Schäffer, 1854)

== Thyrididae ==
- Byblisia albaproxima Bethune-Baker, 1911
- Byblisia latipes Walker, 1865
- Byblisia setipes (Plötz, 1880)
- Chrysotypus dawsoni Distant, 1897
- Dysodia vitrina (Boisduval, 1829)
- Dysodia zelleri (Dewitz, 1881)
- Marmax hyparchus (Cramer, 1779)
- Marmax iridea (Mabille, 1892)
- Marmax semiaurata (Walker, 1854)
- Marmax vicaria (Walker, 1854)
- Ninia plumipes (Drury, 1782)
- Striglina clathrata (Hampson, 1897)
- Trichobaptes auristrigata (Plötz, 1880)

== Tineidae ==
- Afrocelestis inanis Gozmány, 1968
- Afrocelestis sacculata Gozmány, 1968
- Agnathosia byrsinopa (Meyrick, 1933)
- Ceratophaga tenebrosa Gozmány, 1968
- Criticonoma doliopis (Meyrick, 1932)
- Crypsithyris concolorella (Walker, 1863)
- Cylicobathra cuspidata (Gozmány, 1968)
- Ecpeptamena esotera Gozmány, 1968
- Edosa endroedyi (Gozmány, 1966)
- Erechthias travestita (Gozmány, 1968)
- Galachrysis armata Gozmány, 1968
- Hyperbola bradleyi Gozmány, 1966
- Hyperbola pastoralis (Meyrick, 1931)
- Machaeropteris euthysana Meyrick, 1931
- Nannotinea holovalva Gozmány, 1968
- Oinophila argyrospora Meyrick, 1931
- Organodesma heptazona (Meyrick, 1931)
- Perissomastix stibarodes (Meyrick, 1908)
- Phalloscardia semiumbrata (Meyrick, 1920)
- Phereoeca praecox Gozmány & Vári, 1973
- Phereoeca proletaria (Meyrick, 1921)
- Pitharcha atrisecta (Meyrick, 1918)
- Pitharcha chalinaea Meyrick, 1908
- Semeoloncha penicillata Gozmány, 1968
- Setomorpha rutella Zeller, 1852
- Silosca licziae Gozmány, 1967
- Sphallestasis forficula (Gozmány, 1968)
- Syncalipsis myrmecozelis Gozmány, 1968
- Syncalipsis triangularis Gozmány, 1968
- Tinea atomosella Walker, 1863
- Tinea subalbidella Stainton, 1867

== Tortricidae ==
- Cosmorrhyncha acrocosma (Meyrick, 1908)
- Cydia hemisphaerana (Walsingham, 1897)
- Eccopsis wahlbergiana Zeller, 1852
- Grapholita confertana Walker, 1864
- Mictocommosis microctenota (Meyrick, 1933)
- Olethreutes cybicopa (Meyrick, 1933)
- Proschistis petromacha (Meyrick, 1931)
- Rhodotoxotis arciferana (Mabille, 1900)
- Thaumatotibia batrachopa (Meyrick, 1908)
- Tortrix dinota Meyrick, 1918

== Uraniidae ==
- Dirades theclata (Guenée, 1858)
- Epiplema confuscata Warren, 1909
- Epiplema rotunda Warren, 1909
- Epiplema subdistincta Warren, 1905

== Xyloryctidae ==
- Eretmocera laetissima Zeller, 1852

== Zygaenidae ==
- Homophylotis catori Jordan, 1907
- Metanycles contracta Walker, 1864
- Saliunca aurifrons Walker, 1864
- Saliunca solora (Plötz, 1880)
- Saliunca styx (Fabricius, 1775)
- Syringura triplex (Plötz, 1880)
- Tascia instructa (Walker, 1854)

== See also ==
- List of butterflies of Sierra Leone
- Wildlife of Sierra Leone
