= Leonella =

Leonella may refer to:

- Leonella Sgorbati (1940–2006), an Italian Roman Catholic nun who was murdered in Somalia shortly after controversial comments by Pope Benedict XVI concerning Islam
- a character in The Second Maiden's Tragedy
- Megalophota leonella, a snout moth species found in Sierra Leone
