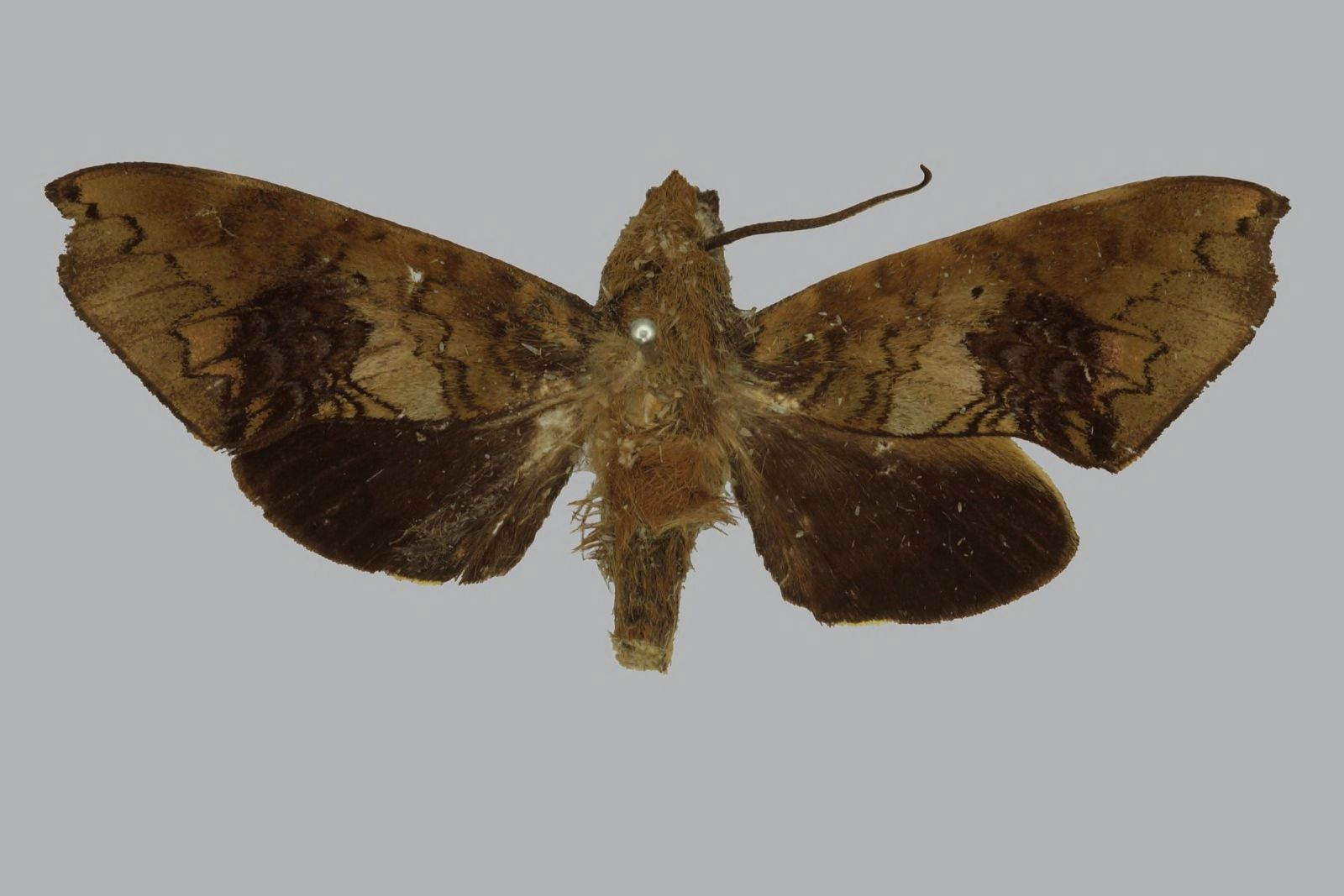

Scientific classification
- Kingdom: Animalia
- Phylum: Arthropoda
- Class: Insecta
- Order: Lepidoptera
- Family: Sphingidae
- Genus: Hypaedalea
- Species: H. neglecta

Binomial name
- Hypaedalea neglecta Carcasson, 1972

= Hypaedalea neglecta =

Species of moth

Hypaedalea neglecta is a moth of the family Sphingidae. It is found from Cameroon to Uganda.
