= Chamanthedon leucocera =

Scientific classification
- Kingdom: Animalia
- Phylum: Arthropoda
- Class: Insecta
- Order: Lepidoptera
- Family: Sesiidae
- Genus: Chamanthedon
- Species: C. leucocera

Binomial name
- Chamanthedon leucocera Hampson, 1919

Species of moth

Chamanthedon leucocera is a moth of the family Sesiidae. It is known from Kenya and Malawi.

The head and thorax are black brown glossed with bronze. The abdomen is orange with a dorsal series of black-brown patches forming dorsal bands on second and fourth segments. The forewings and hindwings are hyaline (glass like) with black-brown veins and margins. The underside of the forewing has a golden-yellow costal area towards the apex and the underside of the hindwing has an orange-yellow costal area to towards the apex, interrupted by a black-brown spot at the upper angle of the cell.
