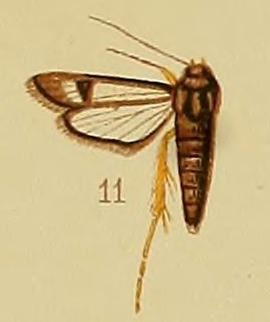
- Chamanthedon fulvipes

Scientific classification
- Domain: Eukaryota
- Kingdom: Animalia
- Phylum: Arthropoda
- Class: Insecta
- Order: Lepidoptera
- Family: Sesiidae
- Tribe: Osminiini
- Genus: Chamanthedon; Le Cerf, 1916

Species
- See text

= Chamanthedon =

Genus of moths

Chamanthedon is a genus of moths in the family Sesiidae.

== Species ==
- Chamanthedon albicincta Hampson, 1919
- Chamanthedon aurigera (Bryk, 1947)
- Chamanthedon bicincta Arita & Gorbunov, 2000
- Chamanthedon chrysostetha (Diakonoff, [1968])
- Chamanthedon flavipes (Hampson, 1893)
- Chamanthedon hypochroma Le Cerf, 1916
- Chamanthedon melanoptera Le Cerf, 1927
- Chamanthedon quinquecincta (Hampson, [1893a])
- Chamanthedon suisharyonis (Strand, [1917])
- Chamanthedon xanthopleura Le Cerf, 1916
- Chamanthedon aurantiibasis (Rothschild, 1911)
- Chamanthedon gaudens (Rothschild, 1911)
- Chamanthedon amorpha Hampson, 1919
- Chamanthedon brillians (Beutenmüller, 1899)
- Chamanthedon chalypsa Hampson, 1919
- Chamanthedon chrysopasta Hampson, 1919
- Chamanthedon elymais (Druce, 1899)
- Chamanthedon fulvipes (Hampson, 1910)
- Chamanthedon hilariformis (Walker, 1856)
- Chamanthedon leucocera Hampson, 1919
- Chamanthedon leucopleura Hampson, 1919
- Chamanthedon ochracea (Walker, [1865])
- Chamanthedon striata Gaede, 1929
- Chamanthedon tapeina Hampson, 1919
- Chamanthedon tropica (Beutenmüller, 1899)
- Chamanthedon xanthopasta Hampson, 1919
