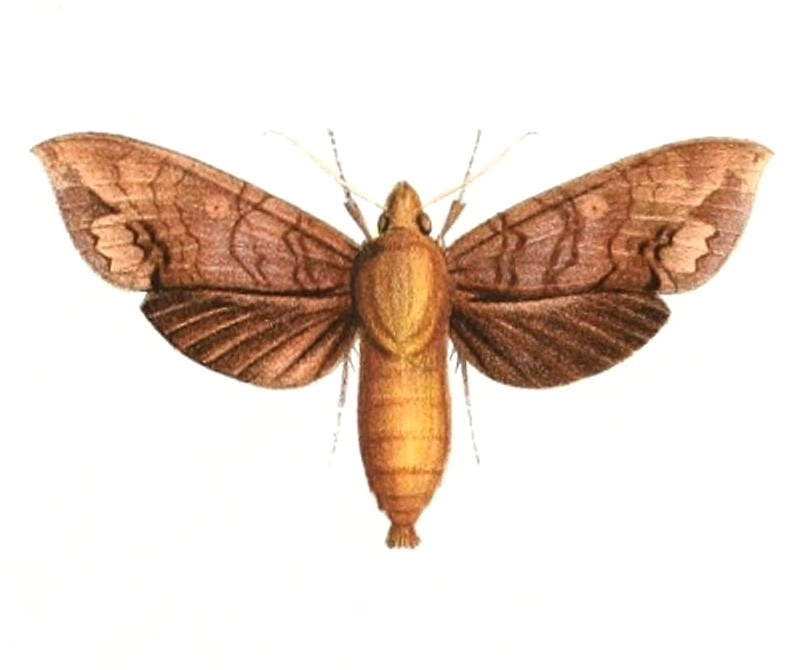
- Hypaedalea butleri

Scientific classification
- Kingdom: Animalia
- Phylum: Arthropoda
- Class: Insecta
- Order: Lepidoptera
- Family: Sphingidae
- Subtribe: Macroglossina
- Genus: Hypaedalea; Butler, 1877

Species
- See text

= Hypaedalea =

Genus of moths

Hypaedalea is a genus of moths in the family Sphingidae.

== Species ==
- Hypaedalea butleri Rothschild, 1894
- Hypaedalea insignis Butler, 1877
- Hypaedalea lobipennis Strand, 1913
- Hypaedalea neglecta Carcasson, 1972
