= Epilacydes =

Scientific classification
- Domain: Eukaryota
- Kingdom: Animalia
- Phylum: Arthropoda
- Class: Insecta
- Order: Lepidoptera
- Superfamily: Noctuoidea
- Family: Erebidae
- Subfamily: Arctiinae
- Subtribe: Spilosomina
- Genus: Epilacydes; Butler, 1875

Type species
- Epilacydes simulans Butler, 1875

Genus of moths

Epilacydes is a genus of tiger moths in the family Erebidae erected by Arthur Gardiner Butler in 1875. The moths are found in the Afrotropics.

== Species ==
- Epilacydes bayoni (Berio, 1935)
- Epilacydes pseudoscita Dubatolov, 2006
- Epilacydes scita (Walker, [1865])
- Epilacydes simulans Butler, 1875
- Epilacydes unilinea (Rothschild, 1910)
