= Aroa sienna =

Scientific classification
- Kingdom: Animalia
- Phylum: Arthropoda
- Class: Insecta
- Order: Lepidoptera
- Superfamily: Noctuoidea
- Family: Erebidae
- Genus: Aroa
- Species: A. sienna

Binomial name
- Aroa sienna Hampson, 1891

Species of moth

Aroa sienna is a moth of the family Erebidae first described by George Hampson in 1891. It is found in India (Nilgiri) and Sri Lanka.
