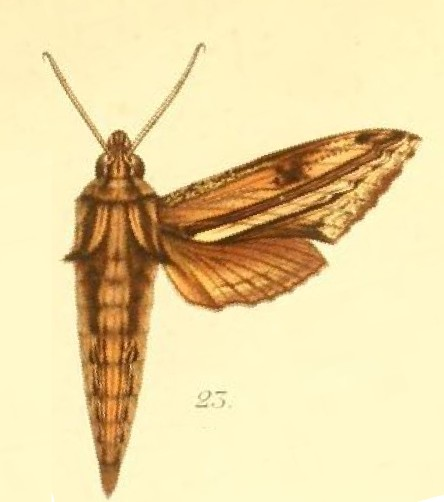
- Centroctena rutherfordi

Scientific classification
- Domain: Eukaryota
- Kingdom: Animalia
- Phylum: Arthropoda
- Class: Insecta
- Order: Lepidoptera
- Family: Sphingidae
- Tribe: Macroglossini
- Genus: Centroctena; Rothschild & Jordan, 1903

= Centroctena =

Genus of moths

Centroctena is a genus of moths in the family Sphingidae first described by Walter Rothschild and Karl Jordan in 1903.

== Species ==
- Centroctena imitans (Butler 1882)
- Centroctena rutherfordi (Druce 1882)
