= Aroa yokoae =

Scientific classification
- Kingdom: Animalia
- Phylum: Arthropoda
- Class: Insecta
- Order: Lepidoptera
- Superfamily: Noctuoidea
- Family: Erebidae
- Genus: Aroa
- Species: A. yokoae

Binomial name
- Aroa yokoae Bethune-Baker, 1927

Species of moth

Aroa yokoae is a moth in the family Erebidae. It was described by George Thomas Bethune-Baker in 1927. It is found in Cameroon.

The wingspan is about 26 mm. Both wings are pale creamy yellow, with the termen edged very broadly (more than half the distance towards the cell) with blackish brown. The underside of the wings is like the upperside.
