= Aglossosia deceptans =

Scientific classification
- Kingdom: Animalia
- Phylum: Arthropoda
- Class: Insecta
- Order: Lepidoptera
- Superfamily: Noctuoidea
- Family: Erebidae
- Subfamily: Arctiinae
- Genus: Aglossosia
- Species: A. deceptans

Binomial name
- Aglossosia deceptans Hampson, 1914

Synonyms
- Aglossosia pallidula Kiriakoff, 1954

Species of moth

Aglossosia deceptans is a moth of the subfamily Arctiinae first described by George Hampson in 1914. It is found in the Republic of the Congo, the Democratic Republic of the Congo and Kenya.
