= Isospidia angustipennis =

Scientific classification
- Kingdom: Animalia
- Phylum: Arthropoda
- Class: Insecta
- Order: Lepidoptera
- Family: Drepanidae
- Genus: Isospidia
- Species: I. angustipennis

Binomial name
- Isospidia angustipennis (Warren, 1904)

Synonyms
- Oreta angustipennis Warren, 1904; Oreta hylaeina Aurivillius, 1925; Oreta glaucinoe Hampson, 1914; Isospidia torulus Watson, 1965

Species of hook-tip moth

Isospidia angustipennis is a moth in the family Drepanidae. It was described by Warren in 1904. It is found in Cameroon, the Central African Republic, Ghana, Ivory Coast, Nigeria and Uganda.
