= Aglossosia =

Scientific classification
- Kingdom: Animalia
- Phylum: Arthropoda
- Class: Insecta
- Order: Lepidoptera
- Superfamily: Noctuoidea
- Family: Erebidae
- Subfamily: Arctiinae
- Tribe: Lithosiini
- Genus: Aglossosia; Hampson, 1900

Synonyms
- Caripodia Hampson, 1900; Charipodia Grünberg, 1910; Diplonychodes Kiriakoff, 1954

Genus of moths

Aglossosia is a genus of moths in the subfamily Arctiinae.

== Species ==
- Aglossosia albescens
- Aglossosia aurantiacella
- Aglossosia chrysargyria
- Aglossosia consimilis
- Aglossosia deceptans
- Aglossosia flavimarginata
- Aglossosia fusca
- Aglossosia fuscicincta
- Aglossosia metaleuca
- Aglossosia persimilis
- Aglossosia semisericea
