= Acrojana =

Scientific classification
- Kingdom: Animalia
- Phylum: Arthropoda
- Class: Insecta
- Order: Lepidoptera
- Family: Eupterotidae
- Subfamily: Janinae
- Genus: Acrojana; Aurivillius, 1901

Genus of moths

Acrojana is a genus of moths in the family Eupterotidae.

== Species ==
- Acrojana rosacea Butler, 1874
- Acrojana salmonea Rothschild, 1932
- Acrojana sciron Druce, 1887
- Acrojana scutaea Strand, 1909
- Acrojana simillima Rothschild, 1932
- Acrojana splendida Rothschild, 1917
