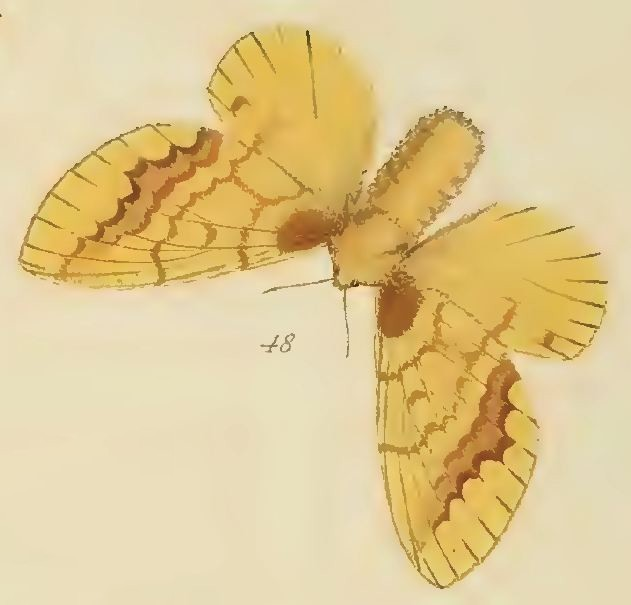

Scientific classification
- Domain: Eukaryota
- Kingdom: Animalia
- Phylum: Arthropoda
- Class: Insecta
- Order: Lepidoptera
- Family: Lasiocampidae
- Subfamily: Lasiocampinae
- Genus: Lechriolepis; Butler, 1880

Synonyms
- Protogenes Saalmüller, 1884; Trabaloides Kirby, 1892

= Lechriolepis =

Genus of moths

Lechriolepis is a genus of moths in the family Lasiocampidae. The genus was erected by Arthur Gardiner Butler in 1880.

== Species ==
Some species of this genus are:

- Lechriolepis anomala Butler, 1880
- Lechriolepis basirufa Strand, 1912
- Lechriolepis citrina (Schaus, 1897)
- Lechriolepis cryptognoma Tams, 1931
- Lechriolepis dewitzi Aurivillius, 1927
- Lechriolepis diabolus Hering, 1928
- Lechriolepis flaveola (Bethune-Baker, 1911)
- Lechriolepis flavomarginata Aurivillius, 1927
- Lechriolepis fulvipuncta Viette, 1962
- Lechriolepis griseola Aurivillius, 1927
- Lechriolepis gyldenstolpei Aurivillius, 1927
- Lechriolepis heres (Schaus, 1893)
- Lechriolepis jacksoni (Bethune-Baker, 1911)
- Lechriolepis johannae De Lajonquière, 1969
- Lechriolepis leopoldi Hering, 1929
- Lechriolepis leucostigma (Hampson, 1909)
- Lechriolepis nephopyropa Tams, 1931
- Lechriolepis nigrivenis Strand, 1912
- Lechriolepis ochraceola Strand, 1912
- Lechriolepis pratti (Kenrick, 1914)
- Lechriolepis pulchra Aurivillius, 1905
- Lechriolepis ramdimby Viette, 1962
- Lechriolepis rotunda Strand, 1912
- Lechriolepis stumpffii (Saalmüller, 1878)
- Lechriolepis tamsi Talbot, 1927
- Lechriolepis tapiae De Lajonquière, 1969
- Lechriolepis tessmanni Strand, 1912
- Lechriolepis varia (Walker, 1855)
