= Chamanthedon tapeina =

Scientific classification
- Kingdom: Animalia
- Phylum: Arthropoda
- Class: Insecta
- Order: Lepidoptera
- Family: Sesiidae
- Genus: Chamanthedon
- Species: C. tapeina

Binomial name
- Chamanthedon tapeina Hampson, 1919

Species of moth

Chamanthedon tapeina is a moth of the family Sesiidae. It is known from South Africa.
