= Acrojana rosacea =

Scientific classification
- Kingdom: Animalia
- Phylum: Arthropoda
- Class: Insecta
- Order: Lepidoptera
- Family: Eupterotidae
- Genus: Acrojana
- Species: A. rosacea

Binomial name
- Acrojana rosacea (Butler, 1874)

Synonyms
- Jana rosacea Butler, 1874

Species of moth

Acrojana rosacea is a moth in the family Eupterotidae. It was described by Arthur Gardiner Butler in 1874. It is found in Ghana.
