= Chamanthedon flavipes =

Scientific classification
- Kingdom: Animalia
- Phylum: Arthropoda
- Class: Insecta
- Order: Lepidoptera
- Family: Sesiidae
- Genus: Chamanthedon
- Species: C. flavipes

Binomial name
- Chamanthedon flavipes Hampson, 1893

Species of moth

Chamanthedon flavipes is a moth of the family Sesiidae first described by George Hampson in 1893. It is found in India and Sri Lanka.
