= Aglossosia fuscicincta =

Scientific classification
- Kingdom: Animalia
- Phylum: Arthropoda
- Class: Insecta
- Order: Lepidoptera
- Superfamily: Noctuoidea
- Family: Erebidae
- Subfamily: Arctiinae
- Genus: Aglossosia
- Species: A. fuscicincta

Binomial name
- Aglossosia fuscicincta (Hampson, 1914)

Synonyms
- Caripodia fuscicincta Hampson, 1914

Species of moth

Aglossosia fuscicincta is a moth of the subfamily Arctiinae. It is found in Kenya.
