= Aglossosia chrysargyria =

Scientific classification
- Kingdom: Animalia
- Phylum: Arthropoda
- Clade: Pancrustacea
- Class: Insecta
- Order: Lepidoptera
- Superfamily: Noctuoidea
- Family: Erebidae
- Subfamily: Arctiinae
- Genus: Aglossosia
- Species: A. chrysargyria

Binomial name
- Aglossosia chrysargyria (Hampson, 1900)

Synonyms
- Caripodia chrysargyria Hampson, 1900; Caripodia chrysargyria ab. coincidens Strand, 1922; Caripodia chrysargyria ab. daressalamica Strand, 1922

Species of moth

Aglossosia chrysargyria is a moth of the subfamily Arctiinae. It is found in the Republic of Congo, the Democratic Republic of Congo, Kenya, Malawi, Sudan, Tanzania, Uganda, Zambia and Zimbabwe.
