= Chamanthedon ochracea =

Scientific classification
- Kingdom: Animalia
- Phylum: Arthropoda
- Class: Insecta
- Order: Lepidoptera
- Family: Sesiidae
- Genus: Chamanthedon
- Species: C. ochracea

Binomial name
- Chamanthedon ochracea (Walker, 1864)

Synonyms
- Aegeria ochracea Walker, 1864

Species of moth

Chamanthedon ochracea is a moth of the family Sesiidae. It is known from South Africa.
