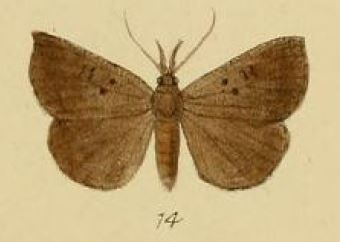

Scientific classification
- Kingdom: Animalia
- Phylum: Arthropoda
- Clade: Pancrustacea
- Class: Insecta
- Order: Lepidoptera
- Superfamily: Noctuoidea
- Family: Erebidae
- Genus: Hypena
- Species: H. saltalis

Binomial name
- Hypena saltalis Schaus & Clements, 1893

= Hypena saltalis =

Species of moth

Hypena saltalis is a moth of the family Erebidae described by William Schaus and W. G. Clements in 1893. It is found in Sierra Leone.

== See also ==
- List of moths of Sierra Leone
