= Chamanthedon gaudens =

Scientific classification
- Domain: Eukaryota
- Kingdom: Animalia
- Phylum: Arthropoda
- Class: Insecta
- Order: Lepidoptera
- Family: Sesiidae
- Genus: Chamanthedon
- Species: C. gaudens

Binomial name
- Chamanthedon gaudens (Rothschild, 1911)

Synonyms
- Aegeria gaudens Rothschild, 1911

Species of moth

Chamanthedon gaudens is a moth of the family Sesiidae described by Walter Rothschild in 1911. It is known from eastern Peru.
