= Aglossosia aurantiacella =

Scientific classification
- Kingdom: Animalia
- Phylum: Arthropoda
- Class: Insecta
- Order: Lepidoptera
- Superfamily: Noctuoidea
- Family: Erebidae
- Subfamily: Arctiinae
- Genus: Aglossosia
- Species: A. aurantiacella

Binomial name
- Aglossosia aurantiacella (Kiriakoff, 1954)

Synonyms
- Caripodia aurantiacella Kiriakoff, 1954; Caripodia pallidior Kiriakoff, 1954; Caripodia ruficeps Kiriakoff, 1954

Species of moth

Aglossosia aurantiacella is a moth of the subfamily Arctiinae. It is found in the Democratic Republic of Congo.
