= Acrojana simillima =

Scientific classification
- Kingdom: Animalia
- Phylum: Arthropoda
- Class: Insecta
- Order: Lepidoptera
- Family: Eupterotidae
- Genus: Acrojana
- Species: A. simillima

Binomial name
- Acrojana simillima Rothschild, 1932

Species of moth

Acrojana simillima is a moth in the family Eupterotidae. It was described by Rothschild in 1932. It is found in Sierra Leone.

The wingspan about 132 mm. Adults are similar to Acrojana splendida, with a salmon-red area on the hindwings.
