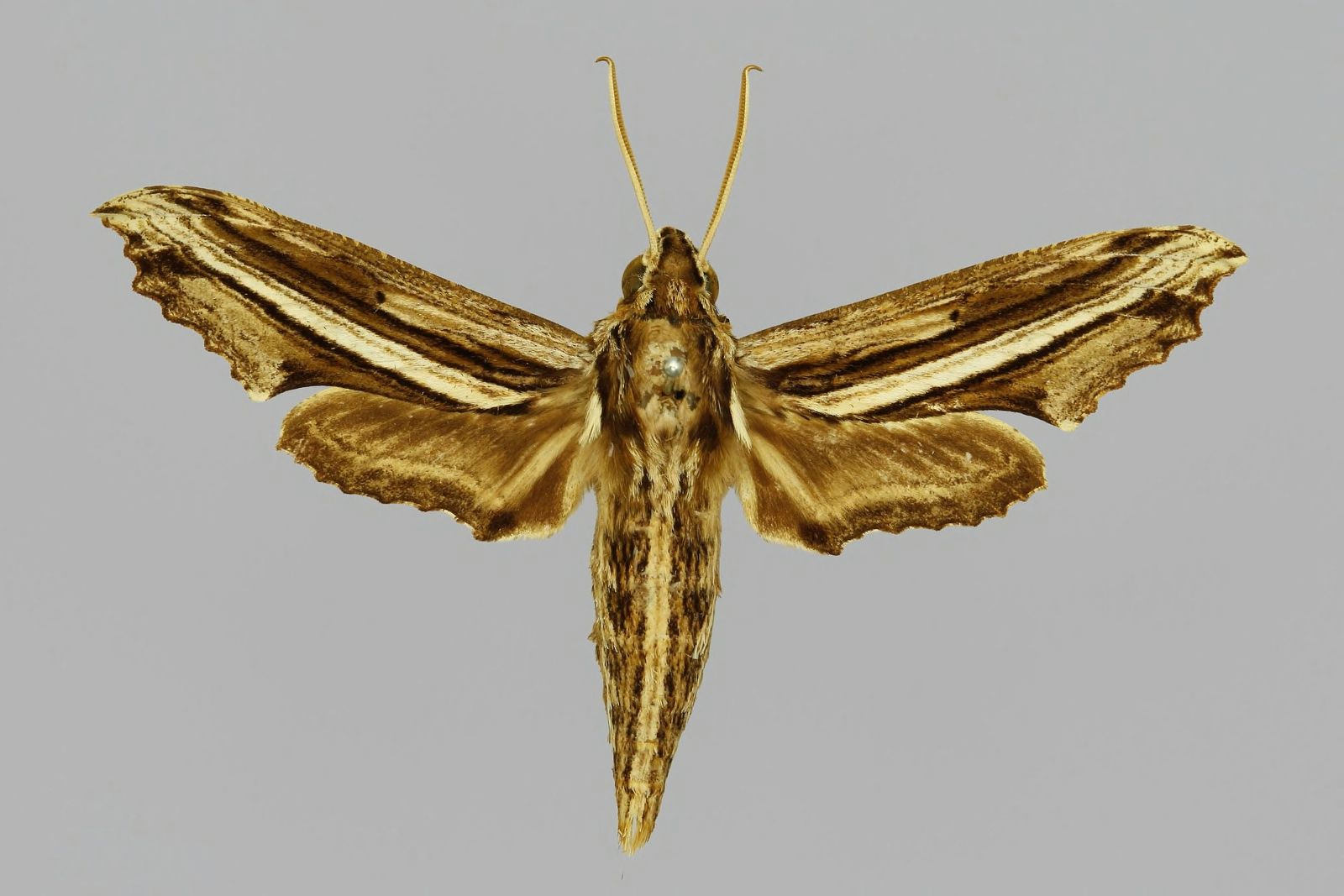

Scientific classification
- Domain: Eukaryota
- Kingdom: Animalia
- Phylum: Arthropoda
- Class: Insecta
- Order: Lepidoptera
- Family: Sphingidae
- Genus: Centroctena
- Species: C. imitans

Binomial name
- Centroctena imitans (Butler, 1882)

Synonyms
- Panacra imitans Butler, 1882

= Centroctena imitans =

Species of moth

Centroctena imitans is a moth of the family Sphingidae. It is known from wooded areas of eastern Africa, from Mozambique to eastern Kenya.
