= Aglossosia semisericea =

Scientific classification
- Kingdom: Animalia
- Phylum: Arthropoda
- Class: Insecta
- Order: Lepidoptera
- Superfamily: Noctuoidea
- Family: Erebidae
- Subfamily: Arctiinae
- Genus: Aglossosia
- Species: A. semisericea

Binomial name
- Aglossosia semisericea (Kiriakoff, 1954)

Synonyms
- Caripodia semisericea Kiriakoff, 1954

Species of moth

Aglossosia semisericea is a moth of the subfamily Arctiinae. It is found in the Democratic Republic of Congo.
