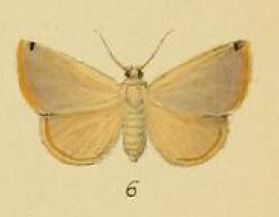

Scientific classification
- Kingdom: Animalia
- Phylum: Arthropoda
- Class: Insecta
- Order: Lepidoptera
- Superfamily: Noctuoidea
- Family: Erebidae
- Genus: Eublemma
- Species: E. colla

Binomial name
- Eublemma colla (Schaus & Clements, 1893)

Synonyms
- Xanthoptera colla Schaus & Clements, 1893

= Eublemma colla =

Species of moth

Eublemma colla is a species of moth of the family Erebidae described by William Schaus and W. G. Clements in 1893. It is found in Sierra Leone.

== See also ==
- List of moths of Sierra Leone
