= Chamanthedon aurantiibasis =

Scientific classification
- Domain: Eukaryota
- Kingdom: Animalia
- Phylum: Arthropoda
- Class: Insecta
- Order: Lepidoptera
- Family: Sesiidae
- Genus: Chamanthedon
- Species: C. aurantiibasis

Binomial name
- Chamanthedon aurantiibasis (Rothschild, 1911)

Synonyms
- Aegeria aurantiibasis Rothschild, 1911

Species of moth

Chamanthedon aurantiibasis is a moth of the family Sesiidae. It is known from eastern Peru.

The length of the forewings is about 7 mm. The legs and palpi are orange yellow and the antennae are brown. The head is black and the thorax black brown with two blue spots and brick-red sides. The abdomen is brick red and the anal tuft wood brown. The forewing basal third is brick red and the median half is hyaline (glass like). The hindwings are hyaline with reddish brown.
