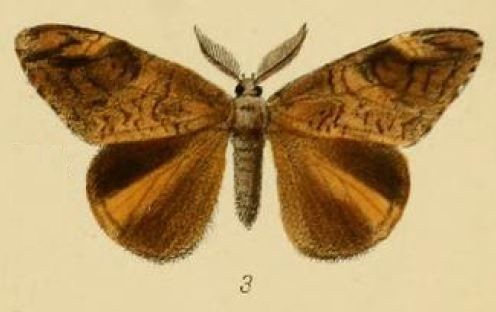
- Aroa danva

Scientific classification
- Kingdom: Animalia
- Phylum: Arthropoda
- Class: Insecta
- Order: Lepidoptera
- Superfamily: Noctuoidea
- Family: Erebidae
- Tribe: Orgyiini
- Genus: Aroa; Walker, 1855

Synonyms
- Gynaephora Hübner, 1819; Caenina Felder, 1861; Ornithopsyche Wallengren, 1863; Ornithopsyche Wallengren, 1865; Bazisa Walker, 1865; Baziza Hampson, 1893; Arva Grünberg, 1913; Hampsona Gupta, Farooqi & Chaudhary, 1986

= Aroa =

Genus of moths

Aroa is a genus of moths in the subfamily Lymantriinae first described by Francis Walker in 1855. Species are distributed in South Africa, China, throughout India, Sri Lanka, Myanmar, and Java.

== Description ==
They are diurnal fliers. The genus differs from Orgyia due to much longer palpi and less-hairy body. Third joint prominent. Legs are less hairy. Female has fully developed wings. Antennae branches are shorter than in male.

== Species ==
Some species of this genus are:

- Aroa abalia Collenette, 1949 western Java
- Aroa achrodisca Hampson, 1910 Senegal
- Aroa anthora (Felder, 1874)
- Aroa asthenes Collenette, 1938 Palawan
- Aroa atrella Hampson, [1893] Sikkim, Assam
- Aroa atrescens Hampson, 1897 Khasia Hills
- Aroa callista (Collenette, 1933) Kivu
- Aroa campbelli Hampson, 1905 India (Chennai)
- Aroa clara Swinhoe, 1885 Bombay
- Aroa cometaris Butler, 1887 Solomons
- Aroa danva Schaus & Clements, 1893 Sierra Leone
- Aroa difficilis Walker, 1855 southern Africa
- Aroa discalis Walker, 1855 southern Africa
- Aroa eugonia Collenette, 1953 Ivory Coast
- Aroa gyroptera Collenette, 1938 Philippines (Luzon)
- Aroa incerta Rogenhofer, 1891 Kenya
- Aroa interrogationis Collenette, 1938 Uganda
- Aroa kambaiti Collenette, 1960 Myanmar
- Aroa leonensis Hampson, 1910 Sierra Leone
- Aroa luteifascia (Hampson, 1895) Myanmar
- Aroa major Hampson, [1893] Sri Lanka
- Aroa maxima Hampson, [1893] Sri Lanka
- Aroa melanoleuca Hampson, 1905 Angola
- Aroa melaxantha (Walker, 1865) southern Africa
- Aroa nepalensis Daniel, 1961 Nepal
- Aroa nigripicta Holland, 1893 western Africa
- Aroa ochripicta Moore, 1879 Hong Kong
- Aroa ochrota (Hampson, 1904) Kerala
- Aroa pampoecila Collenette, 1930 Tanganyika
- Aroa plana (Walker, 1855) northern India
- Aroa postfusca Gaede, 1932 Yunnan
- Aroa pyrrhochroma Walker, 1865 Sikkim, Bhutan, India
- Aroa quadrimaculata (Janse, 1915) Zimbabwe
- Aroa quadriplagata Pagenstecher, 1903 north-eastern Africa
- Aroa risoria Swinhoe, 1903 Java
- Aroa sagrara Swinhoe, 1885
- Aroa scytodes Collenette, 1932 Malaysia
- Aroa sienna Hampson, 1891 Nilgiris
- Aroa simplex (Walker, 1865) southern India
- Aroa socrus (Geyer, 1837) Java
- Aroa subnotata (Walker, 1855) Sri Lanka
- Aroa tomisa Druce, 1896 eastern Africa
- Aroa vosseleri (Grünberg, 1907) Tanzania
- Aroa xerampelina (Swinhoe, 1885) Pune
- Aroa yokoae Bethune-Baker, 1927 Cameroon
