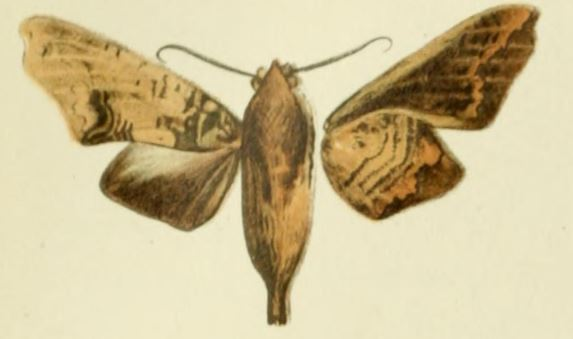

Scientific classification
- Kingdom: Animalia
- Phylum: Arthropoda
- Class: Insecta
- Order: Lepidoptera
- Family: Sphingidae
- Genus: Hypaedalea
- Species: H. lobipennis

Binomial name
- Hypaedalea lobipennis Strand, 1913

Synonyms
- Hypaedalia lobipennis Strand, 1913

= Hypaedalea lobipennis =

Species of moth

Hypaedalea lobipennis is a moth of the family Sphingidae. It is known from West Africa, including Cameroon and Uganda.

The length of the forewings is about 22 mm.
