= Isospidia =

Scientific classification
- Kingdom: Animalia
- Phylum: Arthropoda
- Class: Insecta
- Order: Lepidoptera
- Family: Drepanidae
- Subfamily: Drepaninae
- Genus: Isospidia; Watson, 1965

Moth genus in family Drepanidae

Isospidia is a genus of moths belonging to the subfamily Drepaninae.

== Species ==
- Isospidia angustipennis Warren, 1904
- Isospidia brunneola Holland, 1893
