= Chamanthedon leucopleura =

Scientific classification
- Kingdom: Animalia
- Phylum: Arthropoda
- Class: Insecta
- Order: Lepidoptera
- Family: Sesiidae
- Genus: Chamanthedon
- Species: C. leucopleura

Binomial name
- Chamanthedon leucopleura Hampson, 1919

Species of moth

Chamanthedon leucopleura is a moth of the family Sesiidae. It is known from South Africa.

The head, thorax and abdomen are black brown glossed with greenish blue, the back of head with some red-brown hairs and the neck and shoulders with some white scales. The base of the abdomen with some white scales at the sides and lateral white bars on the fourth and sixth segments. The forewings are black brown glossed with greenish blue mixed with some red brown especially on terminal the area and cilia. There is a black discoidal spot. The hindwings are black brown, mixed with some red brown on the apical area with again a black discoidal spot.
