= Aglossosia persimilis =

Scientific classification
- Kingdom: Animalia
- Phylum: Arthropoda
- Class: Insecta
- Order: Lepidoptera
- Superfamily: Noctuoidea
- Family: Erebidae
- Subfamily: Arctiinae
- Genus: Aglossosia
- Species: A. persimilis

Binomial name
- Aglossosia persimilis (Hampson, 1914)

Synonyms
- Caripodia persimilis Hampson, 1914

Species of moth

Aglossosia persimilis is a moth of the subfamily Arctiinae. It is found in Kenya.
