= Epilacydes pseudoscita =

Scientific classification
- Domain: Eukaryota
- Kingdom: Animalia
- Phylum: Arthropoda
- Class: Insecta
- Order: Lepidoptera
- Superfamily: Noctuoidea
- Family: Erebidae
- Subfamily: Arctiinae
- Genus: Epilacydes
- Species: E. pseudoscita

Binomial name
- Epilacydes pseudoscita Dubatolov, 2006

Species of moth

Epilacydes pseudoscita is a moth of the family Erebidae. It was described by Vladimir Viktorovitch Dubatolov in 2006 and is endemic to Ivory Coast.
