= Epilacydes bayoni =

Scientific classification
- Kingdom: Animalia
- Phylum: Arthropoda
- Clade: Pancrustacea
- Class: Insecta
- Order: Lepidoptera
- Superfamily: Noctuoidea
- Family: Erebidae
- Subfamily: Arctiinae
- Genus: Epilacydes
- Species: E. bayoni

Binomial name
- Epilacydes bayoni (Berio, 1935)

Synonyms
- Estigmene bayoni Berio, 1935

Species of moth

Epilacydes bayoni is a moth of the family Erebidae. It was described by Emilio Berio in 1935 and is found in Uganda.
