= Aglossosia flavimarginata =

Scientific classification
- Kingdom: Animalia
- Phylum: Arthropoda
- Class: Insecta
- Order: Lepidoptera
- Superfamily: Noctuoidea
- Family: Erebidae
- Subfamily: Arctiinae
- Genus: Aglossosia
- Species: A. flavimarginata

Binomial name
- Aglossosia flavimarginata Hampson, 1900

Species of moth

Aglossosia flavimarginata is a moth of the subfamily Arctiinae. It is found in Kenya, South Africa and Uganda.
