= Chamanthedon chrysopasta =

Scientific classification
- Kingdom: Animalia
- Phylum: Arthropoda
- Class: Insecta
- Order: Lepidoptera
- Family: Sesiidae
- Genus: Chamanthedon
- Species: C. chrysopasta

Binomial name
- Chamanthedon chrysopasta Hampson, 1919

Species of moth

Chamanthedon chrysopasta is a moth of the family Sesiidae. It is known from Zambia.
