= Chamanthedon xanthopasta =

Scientific classification
- Kingdom: Animalia
- Phylum: Arthropoda
- Class: Insecta
- Order: Lepidoptera
- Family: Sesiidae
- Genus: Chamanthedon
- Species: C. xanthopasta

Binomial name
- Chamanthedon xanthopasta Hampson, 1919

Species of moth

Chamanthedon xanthopasta is a moth of the family Sesiidae. It is known from South Africa and Zimbabwe.
