= Chamanthedon hilariformis =

Scientific classification
- Kingdom: Animalia
- Phylum: Arthropoda
- Class: Insecta
- Order: Lepidoptera
- Family: Sesiidae
- Genus: Chamanthedon
- Species: C. hilariformis

Binomial name
- Chamanthedon hilariformis (Walker, 1856)

Synonyms
- Aegeria hilariformis Walker, 1856

Species of moth

Chamanthedon hilariformis is a moth of the family Sesiidae. It is known from South Africa.
