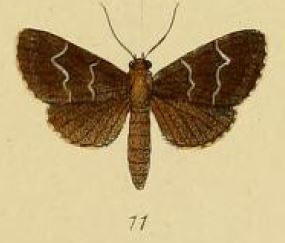

Scientific classification
- Domain: Eukaryota
- Kingdom: Animalia
- Phylum: Arthropoda
- Class: Insecta
- Order: Lepidoptera
- Superfamily: Noctuoidea
- Family: Erebidae
- Genus: Hydrillodes
- Species: H. janalis

Binomial name
- Hydrillodes janalis Schaus & Clements, 1893

= Hydrillodes janalis =

Species of moth

Hydrillodes janalis is a species of moth of the family Erebidae described by William Schaus and W. G. Clements in 1893. It is endemic to Sierra Leone.

== See also ==
- List of moths of Sierra Leone
