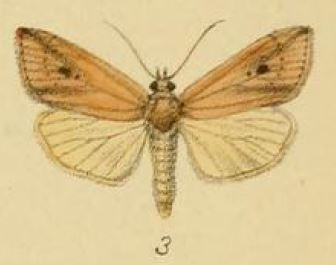
- Melionica bertha

Scientific classification
- Domain: Eukaryota
- Kingdom: Animalia
- Phylum: Arthropoda
- Class: Insecta
- Order: Lepidoptera
- Superfamily: Noctuoidea
- Family: Noctuidae
- Genus: Melionica; Berio, 1970

Type species
- Melionica citrinea Berio, 1970

= Melionica =

Genus of moths

Melionica is a genus of moths of the family Noctuidae.

== Species ==
- Melionica albipuncta (Gaede, 1916)
- Melionica bertha (Schaus & Clements, 1893)
- Melionica citrinea Berio, 1970
- Melionica fletcheri Berio, 1973
- Melionica rubella Berio, 1973
- Melionica mulanjensis Hacker & Legrain, 2006
- Melionica pallescens Hacker & Legrain, 2006
- Melionica subrubella Hacker & Legrain, 2006
