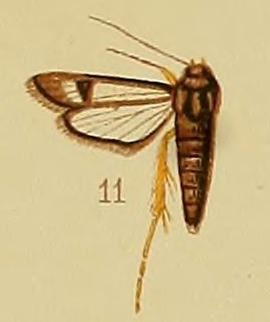

Scientific classification
- Kingdom: Animalia
- Phylum: Arthropoda
- Class: Insecta
- Order: Lepidoptera
- Family: Sesiidae
- Genus: Chamanthedon
- Species: C. fulvipes

Binomial name
- Chamanthedon fulvipes (Hampson, 1910)

Synonyms
- Lepidopoda fulvipes Hampson, 1910

= Chamanthedon fulvipes =

Species of moth

Chamanthedon fulvipes is a moth of the family Sesiidae. It is known from the Democratic Republic of the Congo.
