= Epilacydes simulans =

Scientific classification
- Domain: Eukaryota
- Kingdom: Animalia
- Phylum: Arthropoda
- Class: Insecta
- Order: Lepidoptera
- Superfamily: Noctuoidea
- Family: Erebidae
- Subfamily: Arctiinae
- Genus: Epilacydes
- Species: E. simulans

Binomial name
- Epilacydes simulans Butler, 1875

Synonyms
- Amsacta unistriga Grünberg, 1910; Estigmene simulans var. rachis Strand, 1915; Estigmene simulans ab. furcula Strand, 1919

Species of moth

Epilacydes simulans is a moth of the family Erebidae. It was described by Arthur Gardiner Butler in 1875. It is found in Cameroon, the Democratic Republic of the Congo, Egypt, Equatorial Guinea and Namibia.
