= Chamanthedon amorpha =

Scientific classification
- Kingdom: Animalia
- Phylum: Arthropoda
- Class: Insecta
- Order: Lepidoptera
- Family: Sesiidae
- Genus: Chamanthedon
- Species: C. amorpha

Binomial name
- Chamanthedon amorpha Hampson, 1919

Species of moth

Chamanthedon amorpha is a moth of the family Sesiidae. It is found in Mozambique.

The head, thorax and abdomen are black brown with a slight bluish gloss, and the abdomen has a slight white ring on the fourth segment. The forewings are hyaline (glass like), the veins and margins black brown with a slight bluish gloss. The discoidal bar is strong and there are five hyaline streaks beyond the cell. The hindwings are hyaline, the veins and margins narrowly black brown. The underside of the forewing has some orange yellow below the costa to beyond the cell. The underside of the hindwings has an orange-yellow area on the costa and towards base.
