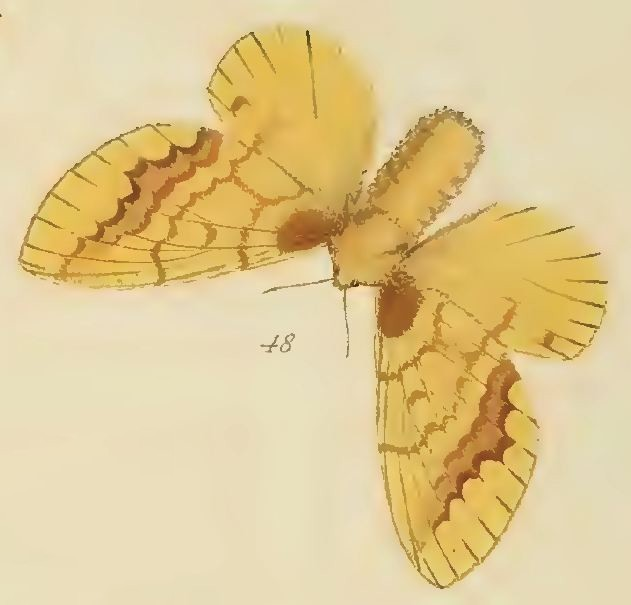

Scientific classification
- Kingdom: Animalia
- Phylum: Arthropoda
- Clade: Pancrustacea
- Class: Insecta
- Order: Lepidoptera
- Family: Lasiocampidae
- Genus: Lechriolepis
- Species: L. stumpffii

Binomial name
- Lechriolepis stumpffii (Saalmüller, 1878)

Synonyms
- Protogenes stumpffii Saalmüller, 1878

= Lechriolepis stumpffii =

Species of moth

Lechriolepis stumpffii is a species of moth of the family Lasiocampidae.

== Distribution ==
It is found in Madagascar.
