= Aroa major =

Scientific classification
- Kingdom: Animalia
- Phylum: Arthropoda
- Class: Insecta
- Order: Lepidoptera
- Superfamily: Noctuoidea
- Family: Erebidae
- Genus: Aroa
- Species: A. major

Binomial name
- Aroa major Hampson, 1893

Species of moth

Aroa major is a moth of the family Erebidae first described by George Hampson in 1893. It is found in Sri Lanka.
