= Aroa plana =

Scientific classification
- Kingdom: Animalia
- Phylum: Arthropoda
- Class: Insecta
- Order: Lepidoptera
- Superfamily: Noctuoidea
- Family: Erebidae
- Genus: Aroa
- Species: A. plana

Binomial name
- Aroa plana Walker, 1855

Synonyms
- Orgyia? plana Walker, 1855; charnidas junctifera Walker, 1865; charnidas ochracea Moore, 1879; Aroa ochracea Swinhoe, 1923; Aroa plana Swinhoe, 1923

Species of moth

Aroa plana is a moth of the family Erebidae first described by Francis Walker in 1855. It is found in India and Sri Lanka. The caterpillar is known to feed on Bambusa species.
