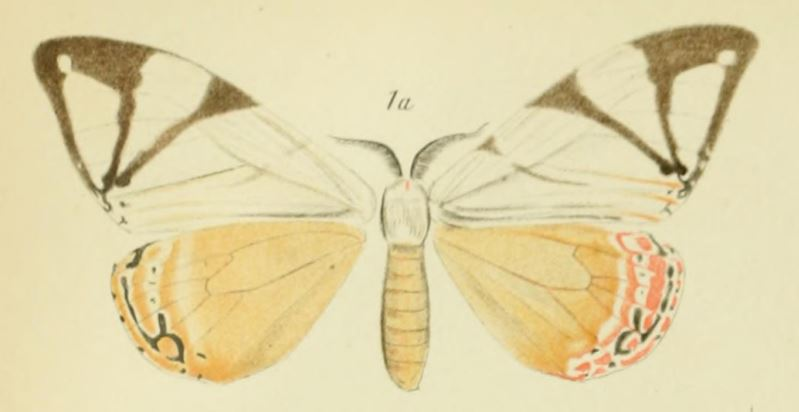
- Otroeda aino

Scientific classification
- Kingdom: Animalia
- Phylum: Arthropoda
- Class: Insecta
- Order: Lepidoptera
- Superfamily: Noctuoidea
- Family: Erebidae
- Tribe: Lymantriini
- Genus: Otroeda; Walker, 1854

Synonyms
- Othroeda Hering, 1926

= Otroeda =

Genus of moths

Otroeda is a genus of moths in the subfamily Lymantriinae. The genus was erected by Francis Walker in 1854.

== Species ==
- Otroeda aino (Bryk, 1915)
- Otroeda cafra (Drury, 1782) western Africa
- Otroeda catenata (Jordan, 1924) Angola
- Otroeda hesperia (Cramer, [1779]) western Africa
- Otroeda manifesta (Swinhoe, 1903) Congo
- Otroeda nerina (Drury, 1782) Sierra Leone
- Otroeda papilionaris (Jordan, 1924) Congo
- Otroeda permagnifica Holland, 1893 western Africa
- Otroeda planax (Jordan, 1924) Gold Coast - Congo
- Otroeda vesperina Walker, 1854 western Africa, Congo, Zimbabwe
