= Chamanthedon elymais =

Scientific classification
- Domain: Eukaryota
- Kingdom: Animalia
- Phylum: Arthropoda
- Class: Insecta
- Order: Lepidoptera
- Family: Sesiidae
- Genus: Chamanthedon
- Species: C. elymais

Binomial name
- Chamanthedon elymais (H. Druce, 1899)

Synonyms
- Aegeria elymais H. Druce, 1899; Synanthedon elymais (H. Druce, 1899)

Species of moth

Chamanthedon elymais is a moth of the family Sesiidae first described by Herbert Druce in 1899. It is known from Mozambique and South Africa.
