= Acrojana scutaea =

Scientific classification
- Kingdom: Animalia
- Phylum: Arthropoda
- Class: Insecta
- Order: Lepidoptera
- Family: Eupterotidae
- Genus: Acrojana
- Species: A. scutaea

Binomial name
- Acrojana scutaea Strand, 1909

Synonyms
- Acrojana sanguineipes Strand, 1910

Species of moth

Acrojana scutaea is a moth in the family Eupterotidae. It was described by Strand in 1909. It is found in Cameroon and Kenya.
