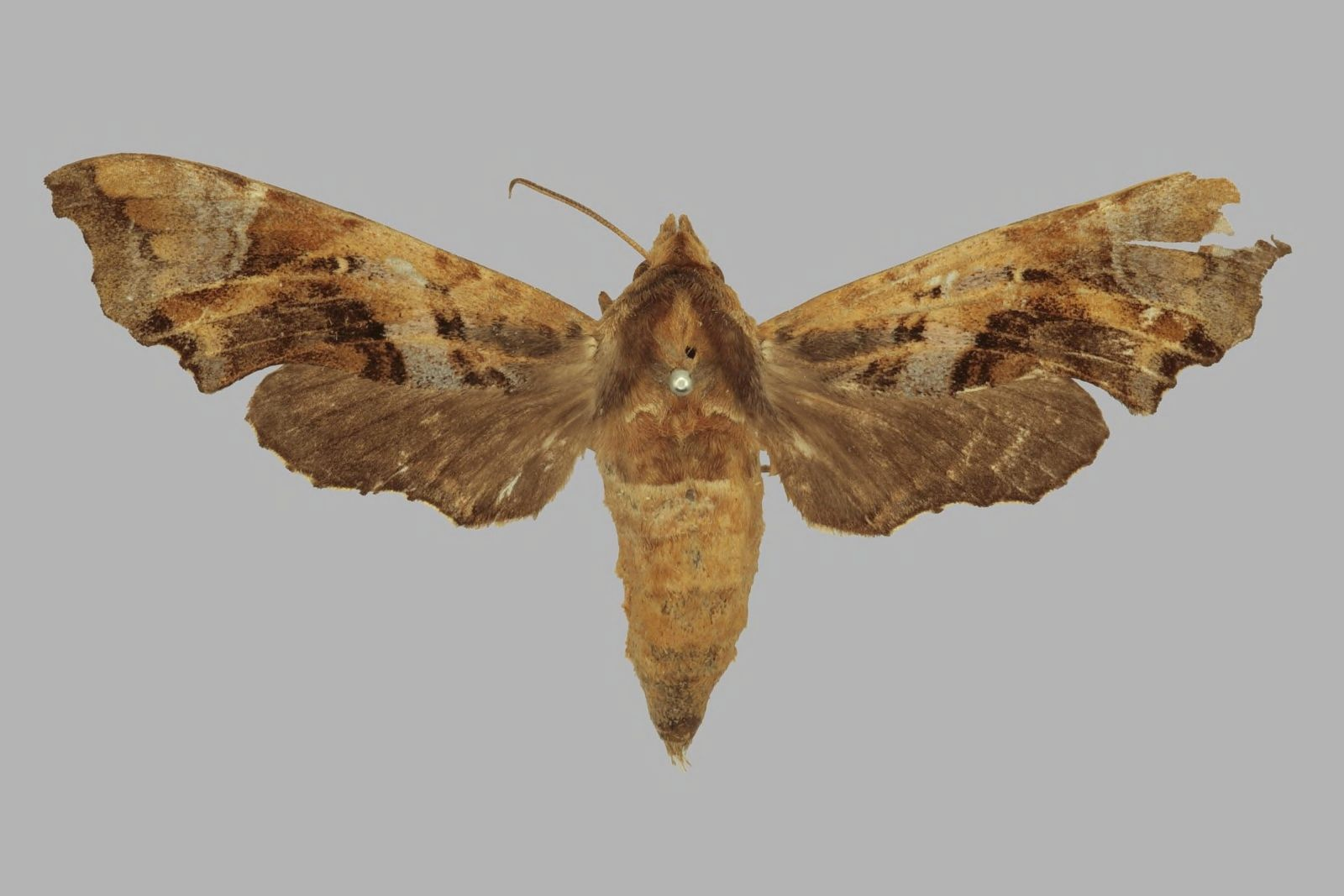
- Female Temnora spiritus

Scientific classification
- Kingdom: Animalia
- Phylum: Arthropoda
- Class: Insecta
- Order: Lepidoptera
- Family: Sphingidae
- Genus: Temnora
- Species: T. spiritus

Binomial name
- Temnora spiritus (Holland, 1893)

Synonyms
- Ocyton spiritus Holland, 1893; Temnora spiritus parvus Kernbach, 1963

= Temnora spiritus =

Species of insect

Temnora spiritus is a moth of the family Sphingidae. It is known from forests from Sierra Leone to Congo, Uganda, and western Kenya.

The length of the forewings is 19–20 mm. It is similar in shape and markings to Temnora plagiata plagiata but much paler overall, dark buff to creamy buff. The forewing outer margin is denticulate and the apex is truncate-sinuate. The forewing upperside has a costal patch which is narrower than in Temnora plagiata plagiata. The hindwing is shaded with burnt amber-brown. The marginal band is brown

== Subspecies ==
- Temnora spiritus spiritus
- Temnora spiritus akissi Pierre, 1989 (Nigeria)
