= Aglossosia fusca =

Scientific classification
- Domain: Eukaryota
- Kingdom: Animalia
- Phylum: Arthropoda
- Class: Insecta
- Order: Lepidoptera
- Superfamily: Noctuoidea
- Family: Erebidae
- Subfamily: Arctiinae
- Genus: Aglossosia
- Species: A. fusca

Binomial name
- Aglossosia fusca (Berio, 1939)

Synonyms
- Caripodia fusca Berio, 1939

Species of moth

Aglossosia fusca is a moth of the subfamily Arctiinae. It is found in Eritrea.
