= Aglossosia consimilis =

Scientific classification
- Kingdom: Animalia
- Phylum: Arthropoda
- Class: Insecta
- Order: Lepidoptera
- Superfamily: Noctuoidea
- Family: Erebidae
- Subfamily: Arctiinae
- Genus: Aglossosia
- Species: A. consimilis

Binomial name
- Aglossosia consimilis (Hampson, 1918)

Synonyms
- Caripodia consimilis Hampson, 1918; Caripodia griseoargentea Kiriakoff, 1954; Oedaleosia conspicua Kiriakoff, 1954

Species of moth

Aglossosia consimilis is a moth of the subfamily Arctiinae. It is found in the Democratic Republic of Congo, Malawi and Mozambique.
