= Acrojana salmonea =

Scientific classification
- Kingdom: Animalia
- Phylum: Arthropoda
- Class: Insecta
- Order: Lepidoptera
- Family: Eupterotidae
- Genus: Acrojana
- Species: A. salmonea

Binomial name
- Acrojana salmonea Rothschild, 1932

Species of moth

Acrojana salmonea is a moth in the family Eupterotidae. It was described by Rothschild in 1932. It is found in Nigeria.
