= Aroa subnotata =

Scientific classification
- Kingdom: Animalia
- Phylum: Arthropoda
- Class: Insecta
- Order: Lepidoptera
- Superfamily: Noctuoidea
- Family: Erebidae
- Genus: Aroa
- Species: A. subnotata

Binomial name
- Aroa subnotata (Walker, 1855)

Synonyms
- Lacida subnotata Walker, 1855

Species of moth

Aroa subnotata is a moth of the family Erebidae first described by Francis Walker in 1855. It is found in Sri Lanka.
