= Epilacydes scita =

Scientific classification
- Kingdom: Animalia
- Phylum: Arthropoda
- Class: Insecta
- Order: Lepidoptera
- Superfamily: Noctuoidea
- Family: Erebidae
- Subfamily: Arctiinae
- Genus: Epilacydes
- Species: E. scita

Binomial name
- Epilacydes scita (Walker, [1865])

Synonyms
- Aloa scita Walker, [1865]; Estigmene scita

Species of moth

Epilacydes scita is a species of moth of the family Erebidae. It was described by Francis Walker in 1865. It is found in Ghana, Senegal, Sierra Leone, Cameroon, the Democratic Republic of the Congo, the Gambia, Kenya, Nigeria and Tanzania.

The larvae feed on grasses.
