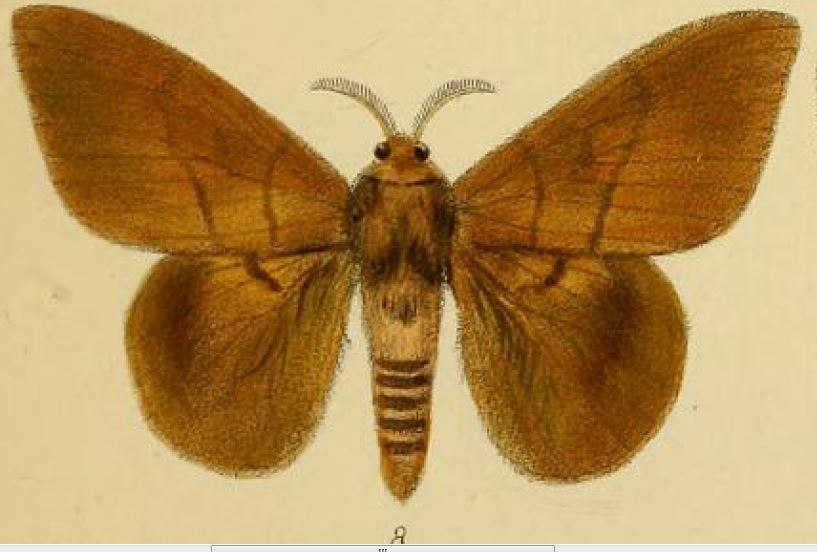

Scientific classification
- Kingdom: Animalia
- Phylum: Arthropoda
- Class: Insecta
- Order: Lepidoptera
- Family: Lasiocampidae
- Genus: Lechriolepis
- Species: L. heres

Binomial name
- Lechriolepis heres (Schaus & Clements, 1893)

Synonyms
- Lasiocampa heres Schaus & Clements, 1893; Lechriolepis dimidiata Strand, 1912; Lechriolepis disparilis Strand, 1912; Lechriolepis obscurata Strand, 1912

= Lechriolepis heres =

Species of moth

Lechriolepis heres is a species of moth of the family Lasiocampidae described by William Schaus and W. G. Clements in 1893.

== Distribution ==
It is found in Sierra Leone.
