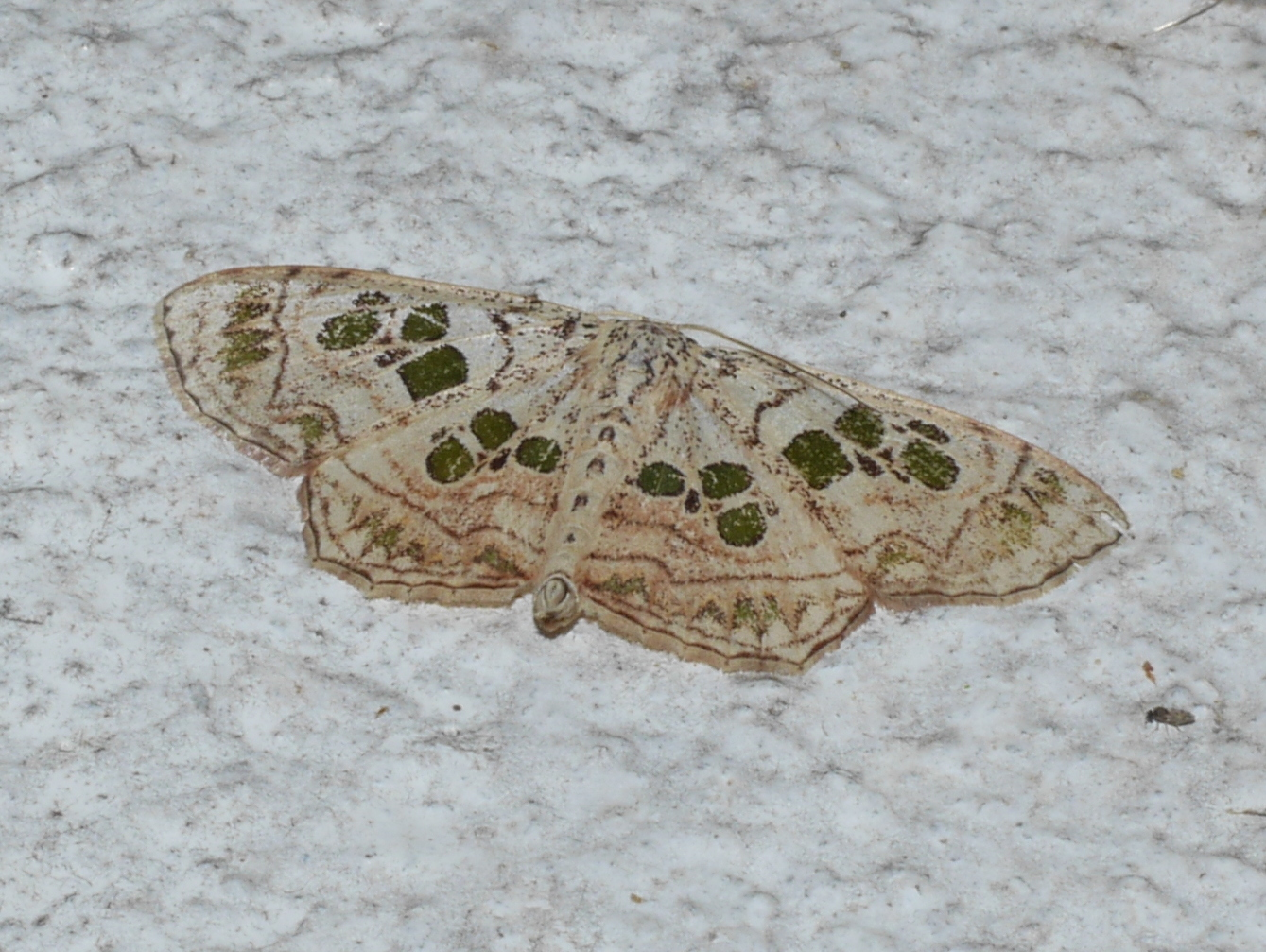

Scientific classification
- Kingdom: Animalia
- Phylum: Arthropoda
- Clade: Pancrustacea
- Class: Insecta
- Order: Lepidoptera
- Family: Geometridae
- Genus: Scopula
- Species: S. dentilinea

Binomial name
- Scopula dentilinea (Warren, 1897)

Synonyms
- Antitrygodes dentilinea Warren, 1897

= Scopula dentilinea =

Species of geometer moth in subfamily Sterrhinae

Scopula dentilinea is a species of moth in the family Geometridae. It was first described by William Warren in 1897. It is found in Madagascar, Sierra Leone, São Tomé and Zambia.
