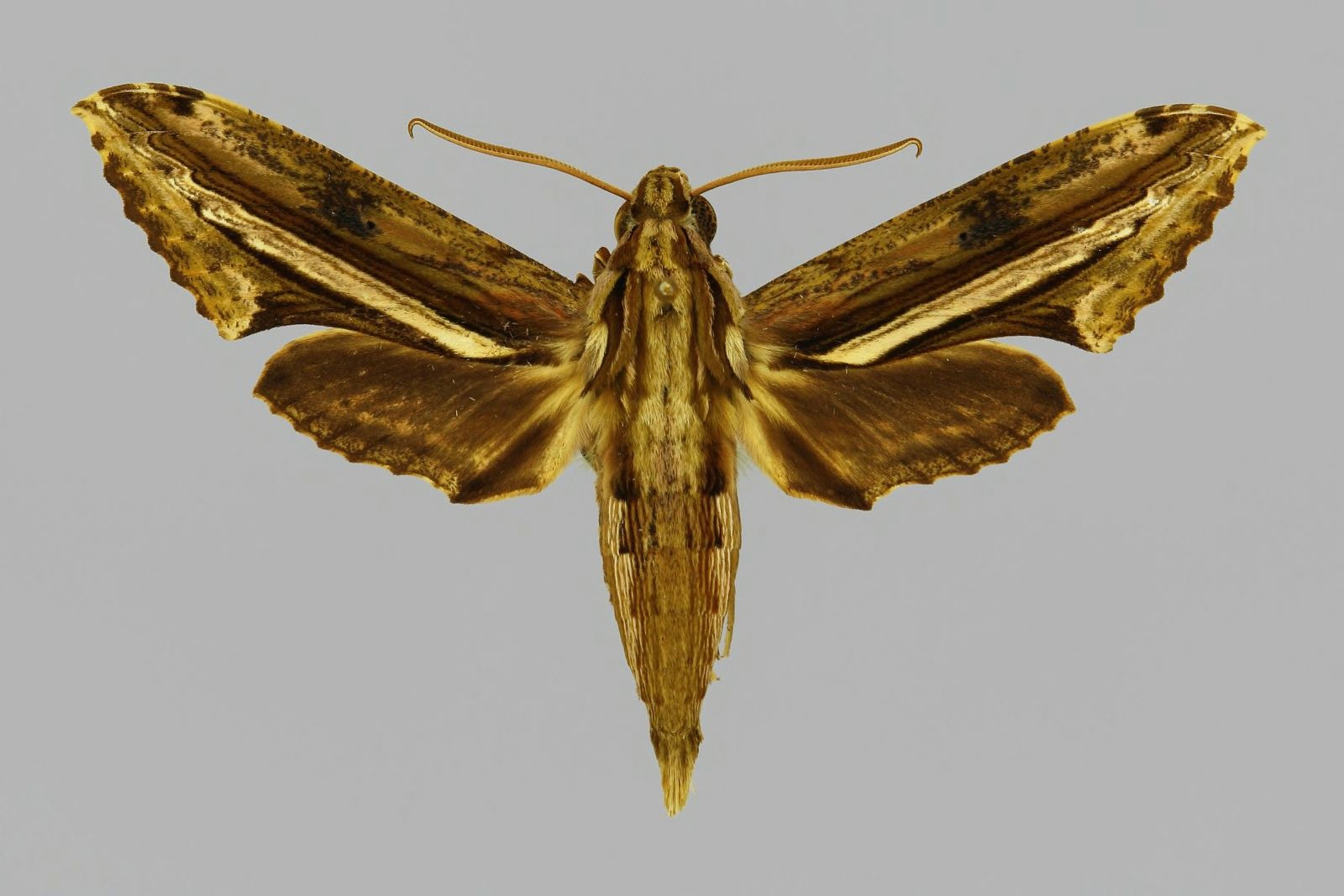

Scientific classification
- Kingdom: Animalia
- Phylum: Arthropoda
- Class: Insecta
- Order: Lepidoptera
- Family: Sphingidae
- Genus: Centroctena
- Species: C. rutherfordi

Binomial name
- Centroctena rutherfordi (H. Druce, 1882)

Synonyms
- Panacra rutherfordi H. Druce, 1882; Chaerocampa undulata Aurivillius, 1900; Panacra sallmuelleri Möschler, 1890

= Centroctena rutherfordi =

Species of moth

Centroctena rutherfordi is a moth of the family Sphingidaefirst described by Herbert Druce in 1882. It is known from forests from Sierra Leone to Uganda and western Kenya. It is also found in the Usambara Mountains of north-eastern Tanzania.

The length of the forewings is 30–34 mm.
