= Aglossosia albescens =

Scientific classification
- Kingdom: Animalia
- Phylum: Arthropoda
- Clade: Pancrustacea
- Class: Insecta
- Order: Lepidoptera
- Superfamily: Noctuoidea
- Family: Erebidae
- Subfamily: Arctiinae
- Genus: Aglossosia
- Species: A. albescens

Binomial name
- Aglossosia albescens (Hampson, 1907)

Synonyms
- Caripodia albescens Hampson, 1907

Species of moth

Aglossosia albescens is a moth of the subfamily Arctiinae. It is found in Nigeria and Sierra Leone.
