= Chamanthedon striata =

Scientific classification
- Domain: Eukaryota
- Kingdom: Animalia
- Phylum: Arthropoda
- Class: Insecta
- Order: Lepidoptera
- Family: Sesiidae
- Genus: Chamanthedon
- Species: C. striata

Binomial name
- Chamanthedon striata Gaede, 1929

Species of moth

Chamanthedon striata is a moth of the family Sesiidae. It is known from Sierra Leone.
