= Acrocercops siphonaula =

Scientific classification
- Kingdom: Animalia
- Phylum: Arthropoda
- Class: Insecta
- Order: Lepidoptera
- Family: Gracillariidae
- Genus: Acrocercops
- Species: A. siphonaula

Binomial name
- Acrocercops siphonaula Meyrick, 1931

Species of moth

Acrocercops siphonaula is a species of moth in the family Gracillariidae. It is found in Sierra Leone.

The larvae feed on Cola species, including Cola nitida. They probably mine the leaves of their host plant.
