= Aglossosia metaleuca =

Scientific classification
- Kingdom: Animalia
- Phylum: Arthropoda
- Class: Insecta
- Order: Lepidoptera
- Superfamily: Noctuoidea
- Family: Erebidae
- Subfamily: Arctiinae
- Genus: Aglossosia
- Species: A. metaleuca

Binomial name
- Aglossosia metaleuca (Hampson, 1900)

Synonyms
- Caripodia metaleuca Hampson, 1900

Species of moth

Aglossosia metaleuca is a moth of the subfamily Arctiinae. It is found in Sierra Leone.
