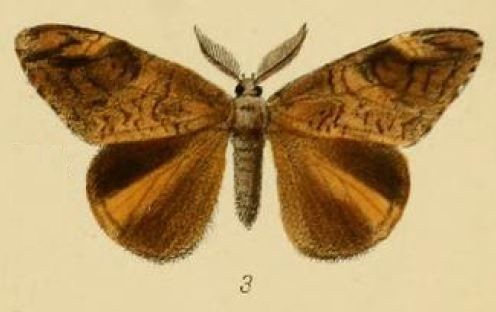

Scientific classification
- Kingdom: Animalia
- Phylum: Arthropoda
- Class: Insecta
- Order: Lepidoptera
- Superfamily: Noctuoidea
- Family: Erebidae
- Genus: Aroa
- Species: A. danva

Binomial name
- Aroa danva Schaus & Clements, 1893

= Aroa danva =

Species of moth

Aroa danva is a moth in the subfamily Lymantriinae described by William Schaus and W. G. Clements in 1893.

== Distribution ==
This species is found in Cameroon and Sierra Leone.
