= Uripao =

Scientific classification
- Kingdom: Animalia
- Phylum: Arthropoda
- Class: Insecta
- Order: Lepidoptera
- Superfamily: Noctuoidea
- Family: Erebidae
- Subfamily: Calpinae
- Genus: Uripao; Hampson, 1926
- Species: U. albizonata

Binomial name
- Uripao albizonata Hampson, 1926

Genus of moths

Uripao is a monotypic moth genus of the family Erebidae. Its only species, Uripao albizonata, is found in Sierra Leone. Both the genus and the species were first described by George Hampson in 1926.
