= Scopula nucleata =

Scientific classification
- Domain: Eukaryota
- Kingdom: Animalia
- Phylum: Arthropoda
- Class: Insecta
- Order: Lepidoptera
- Family: Geometridae
- Genus: Scopula
- Species: S. nucleata

Binomial name
- Scopula nucleata (Warren, 1905)

Synonyms
- Somatina nucleata Warren, 1905

Species of geometer moth in subfamily Sterrhinae

Scopula nucleata is a moth of the family Geometridae. It is found in Ghana, Nigeria, Sierra Leone and on São Tomé.
