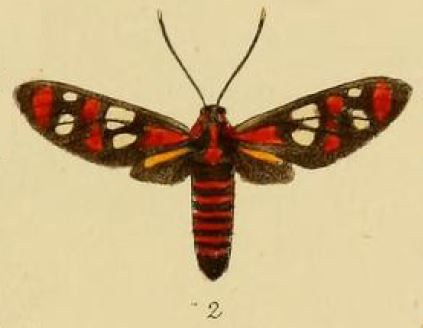

Scientific classification
- Domain: Eukaryota
- Kingdom: Animalia
- Phylum: Arthropoda
- Class: Insecta
- Order: Lepidoptera
- Superfamily: Noctuoidea
- Family: Erebidae
- Subfamily: Arctiinae
- Genus: Amata
- Species: A. divalis

Binomial name
- Amata divalis (Schaus & Clements, 1893)

Synonyms
- Syntomis divalis Schaus & Clements, 1893

= Amata divalis =

Species of moth

Amata divalis is a species of moth of the family Erebidae described by William Schaus and W. G. Clements in 1893. It is found in Equatorial Guinea and Sierra Leone.
