= Scopula cervinata =

Scientific classification
- Domain: Eukaryota
- Kingdom: Animalia
- Phylum: Arthropoda
- Class: Insecta
- Order: Lepidoptera
- Family: Geometridae
- Genus: Scopula
- Species: S. cervinata

Binomial name
- Scopula cervinata (Warren, 1905)

Synonyms
- Emmiltis cervinata Warren, 1905

Species of geometer moth in subfamily Sterrhinae

Scopula cervinata is a moth of the family Geometridae. It was described by Warren in 1905. It is endemic to Sierra Leone.
