= Glyphipterix gemmatella =

Scientific classification
- Kingdom: Animalia
- Phylum: Arthropoda
- Clade: Pancrustacea
- Class: Insecta
- Order: Lepidoptera
- Family: Glyphipterigidae
- Genus: Glyphipterix
- Species: G. gemmatella

Binomial name
- Glyphipterix gemmatella (Walker, 1864)

Synonyms
- Gelechia gemmatella Walker, 1864

Species of moth

Glyphipterix gemmatella is a moth in the family Glyphipterigidae. It is known from the Republic of Congo and Sierra Leone.
