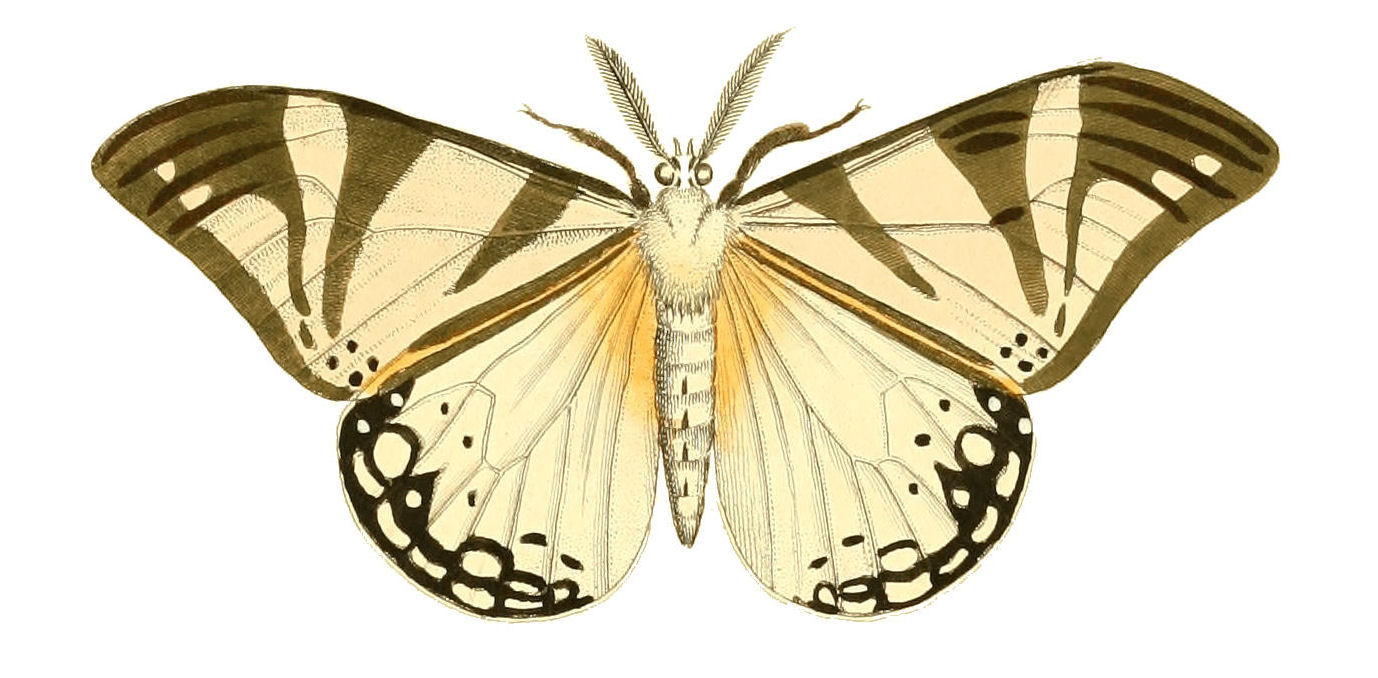
- Illustration by Dru Drury

Scientific classification
- Kingdom: Animalia
- Phylum: Arthropoda
- Class: Insecta
- Order: Lepidoptera
- Superfamily: Noctuoidea
- Family: Erebidae
- Genus: Otroeda
- Species: O. cafra

Binomial name
- Otroeda cafra (Drury, 1782)

Synonyms
- Phalaena cafra Drury, 1782; Nyctemera aino Bryk, 1915

= Otroeda cafra =

Species of moth

Otroeda cafra is a species of moth in the tussock-moth subfamily Lymantriinae. It was first described by Dru Drury in 1782 from Sierra Leone, and is also found in Cameroon, DR Congo, Malawi, and Nigeria.

== Description ==
Upperside. Antennae deeply pectinated and brown. Head white. Thorax and abdomen yellowish grey. Anterior wings white, edged with a dull blackish, and a large patch of the same at the tips, with two streaks also running from the anterior edges almost across the wings; one near the shoulders, the other in the middle, both narrowing as they go, and ending in points. A little group of spots is also placed at the lower corners. Posterior wings white, but next the body yellow, with a very irregular dark border running along the external edges, on which are several white spots unevenly dispersed, and of various forms.

Underside. Palpi white, tipped with black. Forelegs red underneath, and black above, the ends being black: the other legs grey, the tips black. Breast and abdomen yellow grey. Wings coloured as on the upperside, but fainter. Margins of the wings entire. Wingspan 4 inches (100 mm).
