= Isospidia brunneola =

Scientific classification
- Kingdom: Animalia
- Phylum: Arthropoda
- Class: Insecta
- Order: Lepidoptera
- Family: Drepanidae
- Genus: Isospidia
- Species: I. brunneola

Binomial name
- Isospidia brunneola (Holland, 1893)

Synonyms
- Callidrepana brunneola Holland, 1893; Uranometra brunneola

Species of hook-tip moth

Isospidia brunneola is a moth in the family Drepanidae. It was described by William Jacob Holland in 1893. It is found in Cameroon, the Democratic Republic of the Congo, Gabon and Sierra Leone.
