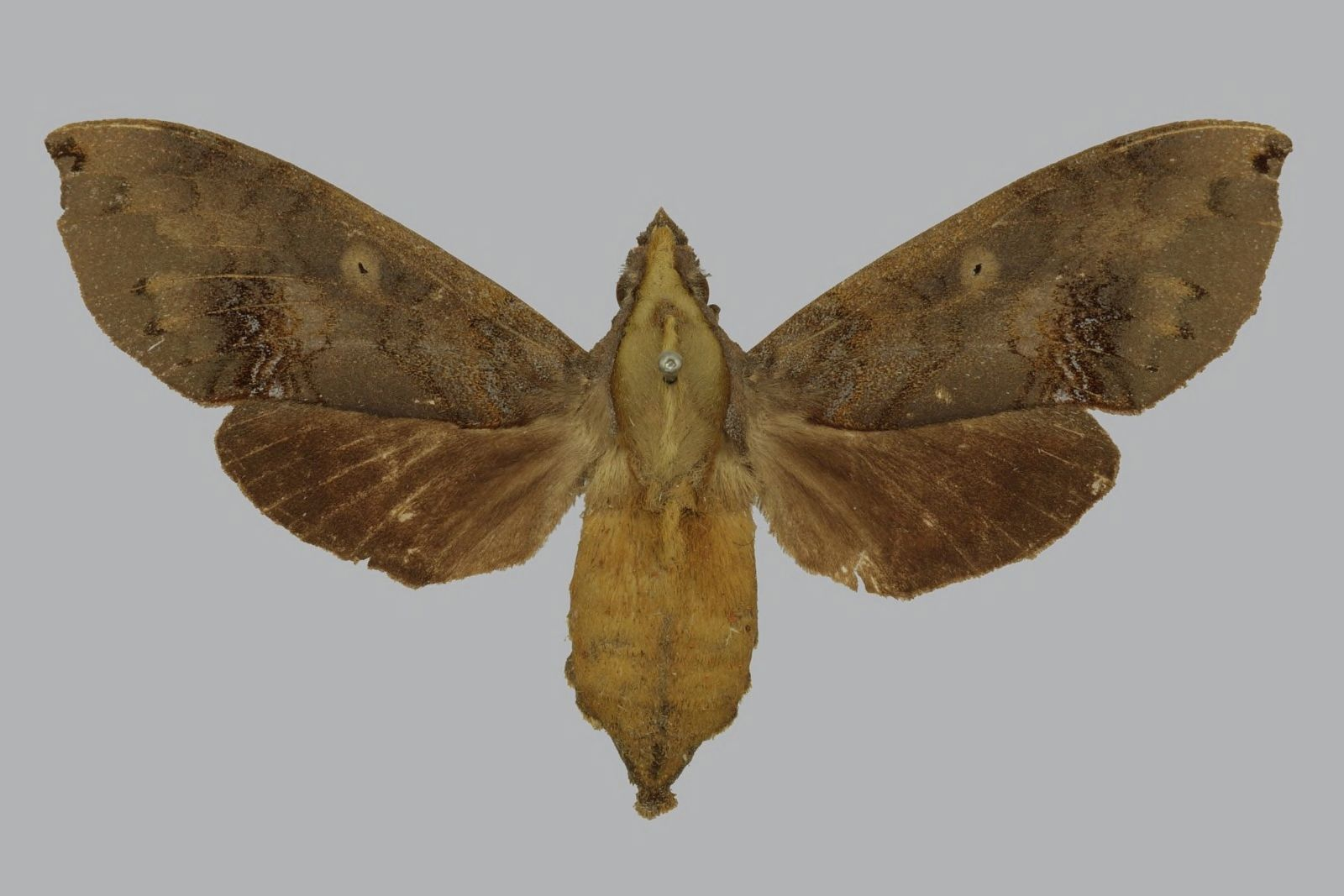

Scientific classification
- Kingdom: Animalia
- Phylum: Arthropoda
- Class: Insecta
- Order: Lepidoptera
- Family: Sphingidae
- Genus: Hypaedalea
- Species: H. butleri

Binomial name
- Hypaedalea butleri Rothschild, 1894

Synonyms
- Temnora viridis Clark, 1936

= Hypaedalea butleri =

Species of moth

Hypaedalea butleri is a moth of the family Sphingidae. It is known from forests from Sierra Leone to Congo and Uganda.

The length of the forewings is 25–27 mm for males and females. The thorax has a large green median dorsal patch that extends onto the head and is laterally bordered by a brown line. The abdomen is pale yellowish-brown. The thorax and abdomen are buff-yellow ventrally. The forewing upperside is purplish-brown with irregular narrow dark brown transverse lines, a minute discal spot and a broad well defined very irregular dark purple brown marginal band. The hindwing upperside is uniformly dark brown.
