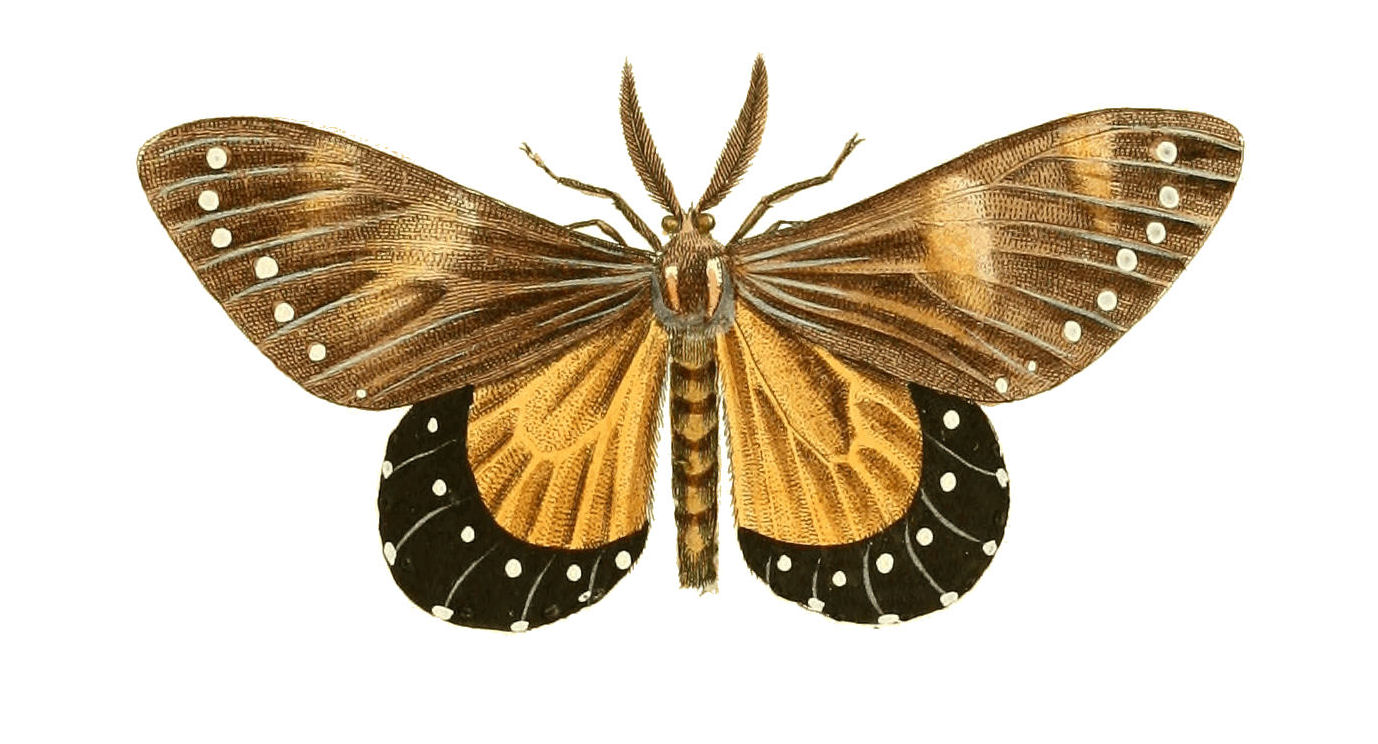
- Illustration by Dru Drury

Scientific classification
- Kingdom: Animalia
- Phylum: Arthropoda
- Clade: Pancrustacea
- Class: Insecta
- Order: Lepidoptera
- Superfamily: Noctuoidea
- Family: Erebidae
- Genus: Otroeda
- Species: O. nerina

Binomial name
- Otroeda nerina (Drury, 1782)

Synonyms
- Phalaena nerina Drury, 1782; Nyctemera occidentis Swinhoe, 1923

= Otroeda nerina =

Species of moth

Otroeda nerina is a species of moth in the tussock-moth subfamily Lymantriinae. It was first described by Dru Drury in 1782 from Sierra Leone, and is also found in Cameroon, DR Congo, Gabon, Ghana and Nigeria.

== Description ==
Upperside. Antennae strongly pectinated and brown. Head brown, the front being white. Thorax brown, with two white streaks along it. Abdomen brown. Wings black, streaked with light brown from the shoulders along the tendons, and two light yellowish patches, almost crossing the wings from the anterior edges, with a row of white spots placed along the external edges. Posterior wings dark yellow, with a deep black border running along the external edges from the upper to the abdominal corners.

Underside. Palpi black. Mouth white. Neck and breast yellow. Legs brown, and yellow at top, and white beneath. Abdomen white, streaked longitudinally with brown. Anus yellow. Wings coloured as on the upperside, but brighter. Margins of all the wings entire. Wingspan 3 1/2 inches (88 mm).
