= Acrojana sciron =

Scientific classification
- Kingdom: Animalia
- Phylum: Arthropoda
- Class: Insecta
- Order: Lepidoptera
- Family: Eupterotidae
- Genus: Acrojana
- Species: A. sciron

Binomial name
- Acrojana sciron (Druce, 1887)

Synonyms
- Jana sciron Druce, 1887; Acrojana ochracea Strand, 1909

Species of moth

Acrojana sciron is a moth in the family Eupterotidae. It was described by Druce in 1887. It is found in Cameroon, the Democratic Republic of Congo (Katanga), Equatorial Guinea and Sierra Leone.

The forewings are silky fawn-colour, darkest from the base to about the middle, and at the end of the cell beyond two brown lines, the first straight crossing from the inner margin to near the costal margin, which it does not join, the second curved from the inner margin to the apex, bordered on the outer edge with pale whitish fawn-colour. The hindwings are fawn-colour, broadly shaded with bright orange, from the base to the apex. There are three brown lines crossing the wing below the middle from the inner margin close to the anal angle to near the apex, only the outer line reaching that point. Above and below the band on the inner margin are a few greyish scales, and nearer the base a small tuft of black hairs.
