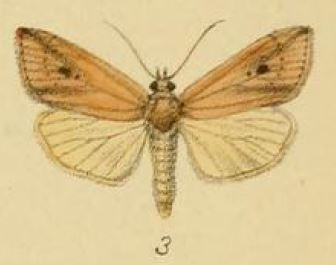

Scientific classification
- Domain: Eukaryota
- Kingdom: Animalia
- Phylum: Arthropoda
- Class: Insecta
- Order: Lepidoptera
- Superfamily: Noctuoidea
- Family: Noctuidae
- Genus: Melionica
- Species: M. bertha

Binomial name
- Melionica bertha (Schaus & Clements, 1893)

Synonyms
- Meliana bertha Schaus & Clements, 1893

= Melionica bertha =

Species of moth

Melionica bertha is a moth of the family Noctuidae described by William Schaus and W. G. Clements in 1893. It is found in the Democratic Republic of the Congo, Nigeria and Sierra Leone.
