= Melittia chlorophila =

Scientific classification
- Kingdom: Animalia
- Phylum: Arthropoda
- Class: Insecta
- Order: Lepidoptera
- Family: Sesiidae
- Genus: Melittia
- Species: M. chlorophila

Binomial name
- Melittia chlorophila (Hering, 1935)

Synonyms
- Parasa chlorophila Hering, 1935

Species of moth

Melittia chlorophila is a moth of the family Sesiidae. It was described by Erich Martin Hering in 1935 and is known from Sierra Leone.
