= Ecpeptamena =

Scientific classification
- Kingdom: Animalia
- Phylum: Arthropoda
- Clade: Pancrustacea
- Class: Insecta
- Order: Lepidoptera
- Family: Tineidae
- Genus: Ecpeptamena; Gozmány, 1968
- Species: E. esotera

Binomial name
- Ecpeptamena esotera Gozmány, 1968

Genus of moths

Ecpeptamena is a genus of moths belonging to the family Tineidae. It contains only one species, Ecpeptamena esotera, which is found in Sierra Leone.
