= Dichomeris eurynotus =

Scientific classification
- Domain: Eukaryota
- Kingdom: Animalia
- Phylum: Arthropoda
- Class: Insecta
- Order: Lepidoptera
- Family: Gelechiidae
- Genus: Dichomeris
- Species: D. eurynotus

Binomial name
- Dichomeris eurynotus (Walsingham, 1897)

Synonyms
- Pappophorus eurynotus Walsingham, 1897

Species of moth

Dichomeris eurynotus is a moth in the family Gelechiidae. It was described by Thomas de Grey, 6th Baron Walsingham, in 1897. It is found in the Central African Republic and Sierra Leone.

The wingspan is about 16 mm. The forewings are whitish fawn, shaded with umber-brown along the dorsal half and on the costa beyond the middle. There is a small black spot at the extreme base of the costa, another wedge-shaped spot at the end of the discal cell, scarcely above the middle of the wing and a larger blackish patch half-way between this and the base. There is an umber-brown shade along the outer side of the bulged portion of the costa, which continues to the apex shading downwards to chestnut-brown along its middle in some specimens, but interrupted by three slender whitish streaks, the first of which is very oblique, passing across the discal nervules and angulated downwards at a point before the termen, but above the middle of the wing, hence it reverts to the dorsum at the commencement of the dorsal cilia. The other two small and inconspicuous whitish streaks precede the apex, and the termen and apex are margined by a line of the same colour, containing a series of three or four blackish spots. The hindwings are dark umber-brown.
