= Epilacydes unilinea =

Scientific classification
- Domain: Eukaryota
- Kingdom: Animalia
- Phylum: Arthropoda
- Class: Insecta
- Order: Lepidoptera
- Superfamily: Noctuoidea
- Family: Erebidae
- Subfamily: Arctiinae
- Genus: Epilacydes
- Species: E. unilinea

Binomial name
- Epilacydes unilinea (Rothschild, 1910)

Synonyms
- Estigmene unilinea Rothschild, 1910

Species of moth

Epilacydes unilinea is a species of moth of the family Erebidae. It was described by Rothschild in 1910. It is found in Nigeria, Senegal, Sierra Leone and Gambia.
