= Acrocercops eurhythmopa =

Scientific classification
- Kingdom: Animalia
- Phylum: Arthropoda
- Class: Insecta
- Order: Lepidoptera
- Family: Gracillariidae
- Genus: Acrocercops
- Species: A. eurhythmopa

Binomial name
- Acrocercops eurhythmopa Meyrick, 1934

Species of moth

Acrocercops eurhythmopa is a moth of the family Gracillariidae, known from Java, Indonesia, as well as Sierra Leone. It was described by Edward Meyrick in 1934. The hostplant for the species is Cola nitida and Sterculia species.
