= Pyrausta approximalis =

Scientific classification
- Kingdom: Animalia
- Phylum: Arthropoda
- Class: Insecta
- Order: Lepidoptera
- Family: Crambidae
- Genus: Pyrausta
- Species: P. approximalis

Binomial name
- Pyrausta approximalis (Guenée, 1854)

Synonyms
- Ebulea approximalis Guenée, 1854

Species of moth

Pyrausta approximalis is a moth in the family Crambidae. It was described by Achille Guenée in 1854. It is found in Sierra Leone.
