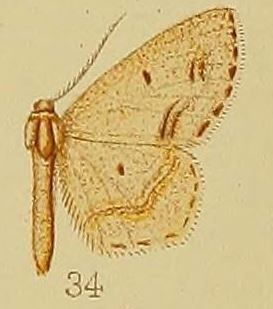

Scientific classification
- Domain: Eukaryota
- Kingdom: Animalia
- Phylum: Arthropoda
- Class: Insecta
- Order: Lepidoptera
- Family: Geometridae
- Genus: Scopula
- Species: S. natalica

Binomial name
- Scopula natalica (Butler, 1875)

Synonyms
- Acidalia natalica Butler, 1875; Craspedia diffusizona Hampson, 1910

= Scopula natalica =

Species of geometer moth in subfamily Sterrhinae

Scopula natalica is a moth of the family Geometridae. It was described by Arthur Gardiner Butler in 1875. It is found in Cameroon, Kenya, Malawi, Sierra Leone, South Africa, Sudan, Tanzania and Zambia.
