= Orygmophora =

Scientific classification
- Kingdom: Animalia
- Phylum: Arthropoda
- Class: Insecta
- Order: Lepidoptera
- Superfamily: Noctuoidea
- Family: Erebidae
- Subfamily: Calpinae
- Genus: Orygmophora; Hampson, 1926
- Species: O. mediofoveata

Binomial name
- Orygmophora mediofoveata (Hampson, 1926)

Synonyms
- Orgymophora mediofoveata Hampson, 1926

Genus of moths

Orygmophora is a monotypic moth genus of the family Erebidae. Its only species, Orygmophora mediofoveata, is found in Ghana, Nigeria and Sierra Leone. Both the genus and species were first described by George Hampson in 1926.

Its host plants include Nauclea diderrichii.
