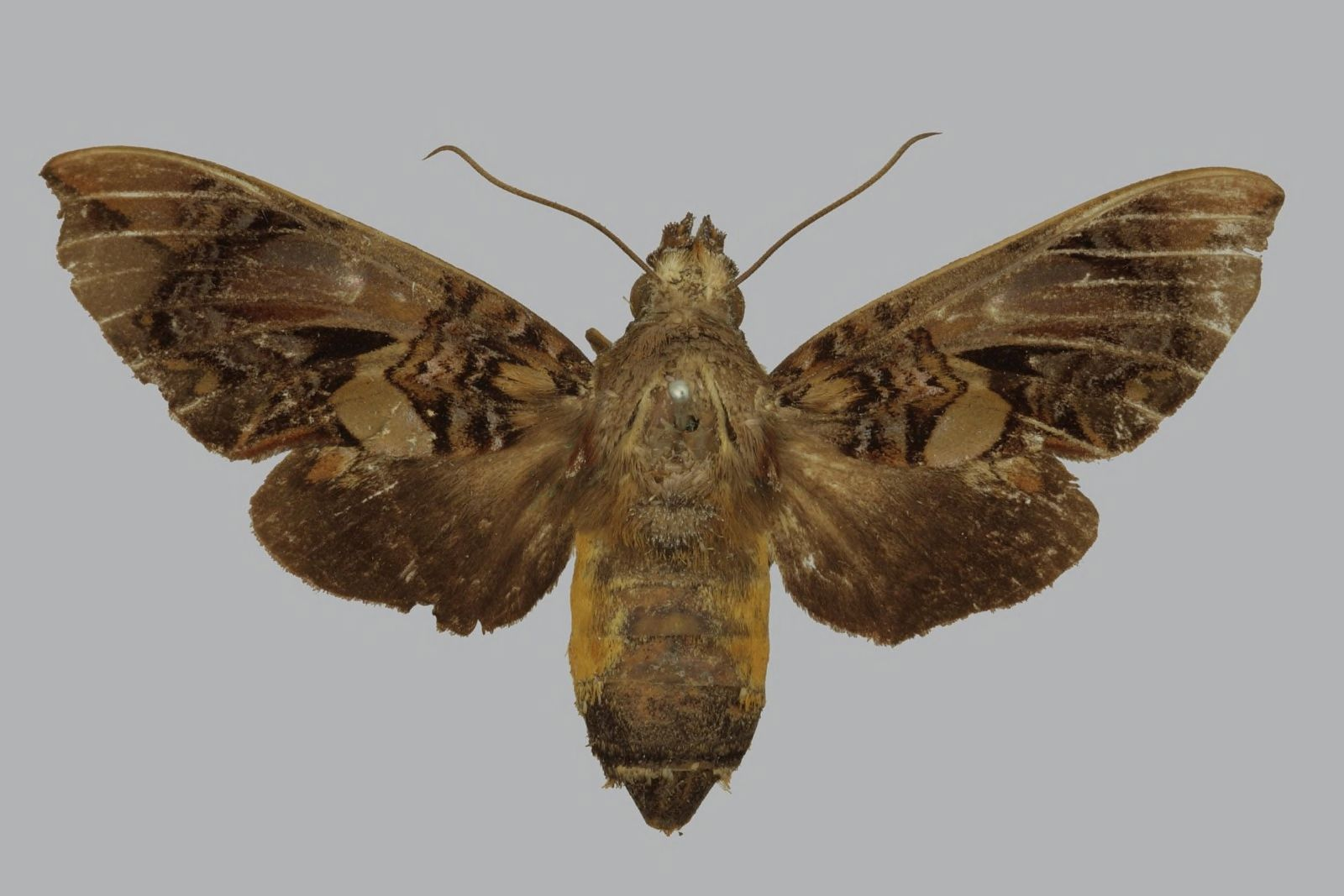

Scientific classification
- Kingdom: Animalia
- Phylum: Arthropoda
- Class: Insecta
- Order: Lepidoptera
- Family: Sphingidae
- Genus: Hypaedalea
- Species: H. insignis

Binomial name
- Hypaedalea insignis Butler, 1877

= Hypaedalea insignis =

Species of moth

Hypaedalea insignis is a moth of the family Sphingidae. It is found from Sierra Leone to Gabon.

The labial palps and underside of the body are orange. The forewing upperside basal area has distinct brownish-black interrupted lines and two triangular spots. There is also a large ovate greyish patch before the middle of the posterior margin and a longer median costal olive-brown area including a minute discal spot. The apical area is olive brown, divided by an oblique line.
