= Acrojana splendida =

Scientific classification
- Kingdom: Animalia
- Phylum: Arthropoda
- Clade: Pancrustacea
- Class: Insecta
- Order: Lepidoptera
- Family: Eupterotidae
- Genus: Acrojana
- Species: A. splendida

Binomial name
- Acrojana splendida Rothschild, 1917

Species of moth

Acrojana splendida is a moth in the family Eupterotidae. It was described by Rothschild in 1917. It is found in Ghana and Sierra Leone.

The wingspan 110 mm (4.33 in) for males and 133 mm ( 4.45 in) for females. The forewings of the males are sooty slaty brown grey, with a black spot near the base of the costa and a postmedian slanting darker transverse line from the costa to the inner margin and a narrow golden greenish transverse very oblique line edged with brown from before the apex to the postmedial line above vein one. The costal two-fifths of the hindwings is bright rose pink, while the rest of the wing is sooty slaty grey. There is an antemedian darker line from the abdominal margin to a pink area, as well as a median dark line from the costal margin, touching the edge of the pink area, to the abdominal margin. The forewings of the females are apple-green with an oblique postmedian band, costal region, a large quadrate patch in and beyond the cell, a series of markings in the basal one-fifth of the wing, and patches and cloudings in the apical and outer one-third of the wing purplish mauve-grey. There is a round chocolate subbasal patch on the costa. The costal one-third of the hindwings is bright carmine-rose, while the rest of the wing is apple-green with lines and a cloud of patches purplish maroon-grey.
