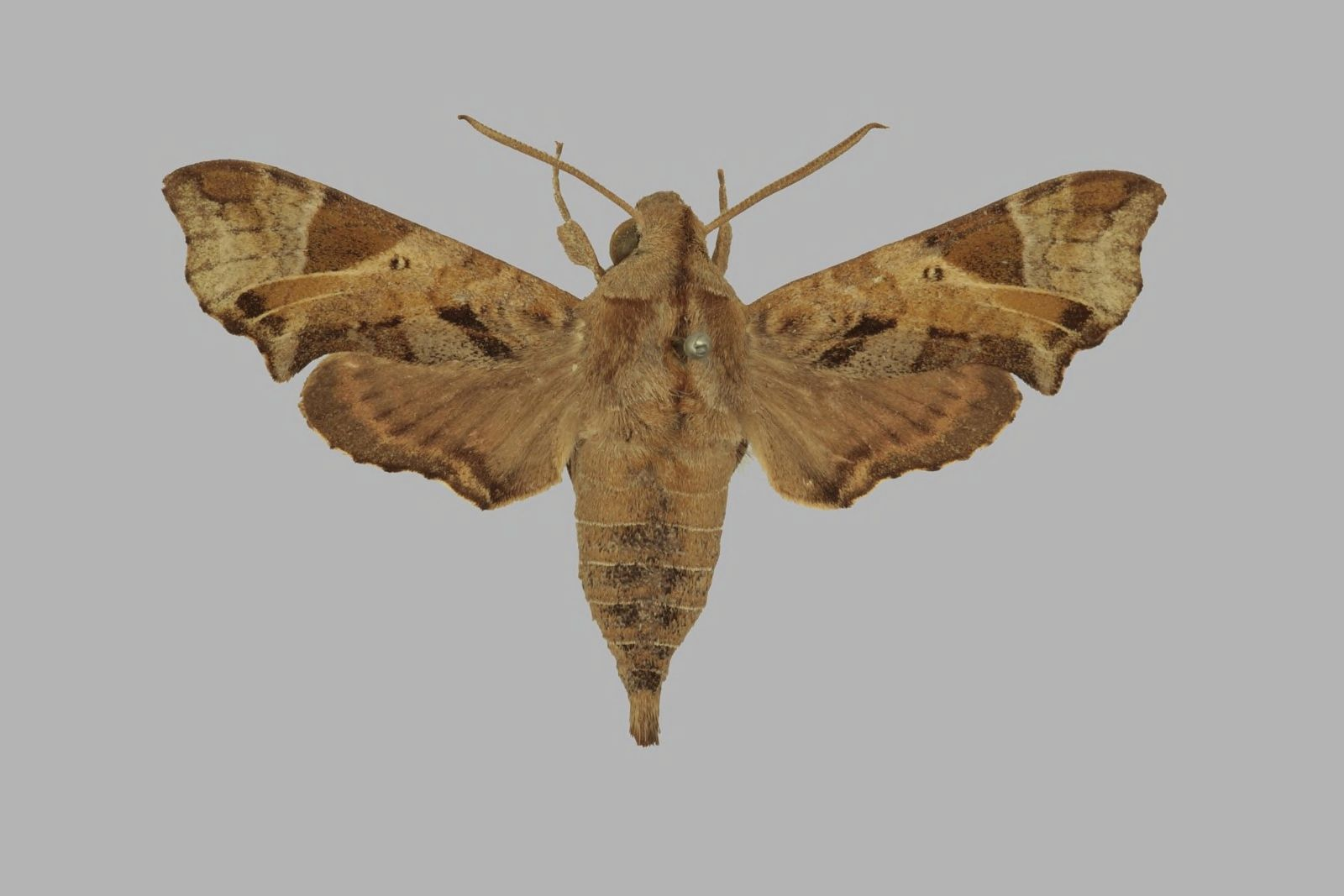
- Temnora plagiata, male, upperside. Zambia.

Scientific classification
- Kingdom: Animalia
- Phylum: Arthropoda
- Class: Insecta
- Order: Lepidoptera
- Family: Sphingidae
- Genus: Temnora
- Species: T. plagiata

Binomial name
- Temnora plagiata Walker, 1856

Synonyms
- Aspledon dicanus Boisduval, 1875; Lophuron maculatum Rothschild, 1894; Panacra confusa Walker, 1856

= Temnora plagiata =

Species of moth

Temnora plagiata is a moth of the family Sphingidae. It is found in Africa.

The length of the forewings is 21–23 mm (0.83–0.91 in).

== Subspecies ==
- Temnora plagiata plagiata (South Africa)
- Temnora plagiata fuscata Rothschild & Jordan, 1903 (wooded habitats from Malawi to east and central Kenya and southern Ethiopia)
