= Megalophota =

Scientific classification
- Kingdom: Animalia
- Phylum: Arthropoda
- Clade: Pancrustacea
- Class: Insecta
- Order: Lepidoptera
- Family: Pyralidae
- Subfamily: Phycitinae
- Genus: Megalophota; Hampson, 1918
- Species: M. leonella

Binomial name
- Megalophota leonella Hampson, 1918

Genus of moths

Megalophota is a monotypic snout moth genus described by George Hampson in 1918. Its only species, Megalophota leonella, described in the same article, is found in Sierra Leone.

== Description ==
What made this genus unique is the highly distinct scale structure on its head, which is where the name Megalophota (meaning 'large-crested') comes from.

The wingspan is about 20mm. The forewings are ochreous white irrorated (sprinkled) with brown, the costal area slightly irrorated to near the apex. The hindwings are ochreous white.

== Discovery ==
During the early 20th century imperial era of taxonomy, an unnamed field collector captured the moth in the wild within Sierra Leone and shipped it across the ocean to England.

Upon its arrival at the British Museum, George Hampspon, acting as the leading authority on the collection, examined the specimen alongside others. He immediately noted that its physical characteristics were entirely distinct from any previously described species.

Upon closer analysis, George Hampson concluded that the moth required a new genus classification, later publishing a detailed formal description of its unique anatomical features.

== Other species ==
The species is the first and currently the only member of the genus Megalophota.
