= List of moths of Ghana =

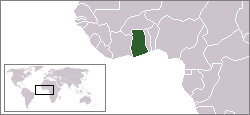
Location of Ghana

There are about 830 known moth species of Ghana. The moths (mostly nocturnal) and butterflies (mostly diurnal) together make up the taxonomic order Lepidoptera.

This is a list of moth species which have been recorded in Ghana.

== Anomoeotidae ==
- Staphylinochrous euriphaea Hampson, 1920

== Arctiidae ==
- Acantharctia mundata (Walker, 1865)
- Afraloa bifurca (Walker, 1855)
- Afrasura discocellularis (Strand, 1912)
- Afrasura indecisa (Walker, 1869)
- Afrasura numida (Holland, 1893)
- Afrasura obliterata (Walker, 1864)
- Afrowatsonius marginalis (Walker, 1855)
- Aloa moloneyi (Druce, 1887)
- Alpenus affiniola (Strand, 1919)
- Alpenus investigatorum (Karsch, 1898)
- Alpenus maculosa (Stoll, 1781)
- Alpenus nigropunctata (Bethune-Baker, 1908)
- Alpenus schraderi (Rothschild, 1910)
- Amata basithyris Hampson, 1914
- Amata nigrobasalis Rothschild, 1910
- Amerila brunnea (Hampson, 1901)
- Amerila fennia (Druce, 1887)
- Amerila leucoptera (Hampson, 1901)
- Amerila luteibarba (Hampson, 1901)
- Amerila metasarca (Hampson, 1911)
- Amerila niveivitrea (Bartel, 1903)
- Amerila puella (Fabricius, 1793)
- Amerila roseomarginata (Rothschild, 1910)
- Amerila vidua (Cramer, 1780)
- Amsacta bicoloria (Gaede, 1916)
- Amsacta fuscosa (Bartel, 1903)
- Amsacta latimarginalis Rothschild, 1933
- Amsacta marginalis Walker, 1855
- Anapisa sjoestedti (Aurivillius, 1904)
- Archithosia makomensis (Strand, 1912)
- Argina astrea (Drury, 1773)
- Asura atricraspeda Hampson, 1914
- Asura distyi Kühne, 2007
- Asura spurrelli (Hampson, 1914)
- Automolis pallida (Hampson, 1901)
- Balacra batesi Druce, 1910
- Balacra caeruleifascia Walker, 1856
- Balacra ehrmanni (Holland, 1893)
- Balacra flavimacula Walker, 1856
- Balacra furva Hampson, 1911
- Balacra herona (Druce, 1887)
- Balacra rubricincta Holland, 1893
- Balacra rubrostriata (Aurivillius, 1892)
- Binna penicillata Walker, 1865
- Binna scita (Walker, 1865)
- Caryatis phileta (Drury, 1782)
- Ceryx semihyalina Kirby, 1896
- Cragia distigmata (Hampson, 1901)
- Creatonotos leucanioides Holland, 1893
- Crocosia phaeocraspis Hampson, 1914
- Cyana basisticta (Hampson, 1914)
- Cyana delicata (Walker, 1854)
- Cyana rubritermina (Bethune-Baker, 1911)
- Disparctia vittata (Druce, 1898)
- Dubatolovia neurophaea (Hampson, 1911)
- Eilema angustipennis Strand, 1912
- Eilema apicalis (Walker, 1862)
- Eilema conisphora (Hampson, 1914)
- Eilema proleuca (Hampson, 1914)
- Epilacydes scita (Walker, 1865)
- Estigmene flaviceps Hampson, 1907
- Euchromia guineensis (Fabricius, 1775)
- Euchromia hampsoni Seitz, 1926
- Eugoa gemina Hampson, 1914
- Eugoa winneba Kühne, 2007
- Euproctosia cretata Hampson, 1914
- Exilisia disticha (Hampson, 1914)
- Logunovium nigricosta (Holland, 1893)
- Melisa croceipes (Aurivillius, 1892)
- Melisa diptera (Walker, 1854)
- Metarctia flavicincta Aurivillius, 1900
- Metarctia haematica Holland, 1893
- Metarctia inconspicua Holland, 1892
- Metarctia kumasina Strand, 1920
- Metarctia priscilla Kiriakoff, 1957
- Micralarctia punctulatum (Wallengren, 1860)
- Muxta xanthopa (Holland, 1893)
- Myopsyche notoplagia Hampson, 1898
- Nanna eningae (Plötz, 1880)
- Nanna melanosticta (Bethune-Baker, 1911)
- Neuroxena flammea (Schaus, 1893)
- Neuroxena medioflavus (Rothschild, 1935)
- Neuroxena sulphureovitta (Strand, 1909)
- Neuroxena truncatus (Rothschild, 1933)
- Nyctemera acraeina Druce, 1882
- Nyctemera apicalis (Walker, 1854)
- Nyctemera druna (Swinhoe, 1904)
- Nyctemera perspicua (Walker, 1854)
- Nyctemera restrictum (Butler, 1894)
- Nyctemera xanthura (Plötz, 1880)
- Ovenna guineacola (Strand, 1912)
- Ovenna subgriseola (Strand, 1912)
- Paralpenus atripes (Hampson, 1909)
- Paralpenus flavizonata (Hampson, 1911)
- Paremonia argentata Hampson, 1914
- Phryganopsis angulifascia (Strand, 1912)
- Pseudothyretes nigrita (Kiriakoff, 1961)
- Pusiola celida (Bethune-Baker, 1911)
- Pusiola minutissima (Kiriakoff, 1958)
- Radiarctia lutescens (Walker, 1854)
- Siccia cretata Hampson, 1914
- Siccia gypsia Hampson, 1914
- Siccia microsticta Hampson, 1914
- Siccia stictica Hampson, 1914
- Spilosoma affinis Bartel, 1903
- Spilosoma aurantiaca (Holland, 1893)
- Spilosoma buryi (Rothschild, 1910)
- Spilosoma curvilinea Walker, 1855
- Spilosoma karschi Bartel, 1903
- Spilosoma occidens (Rothschild, 1910)
- Spilosoma pellucida (Rothschild, 1910)
- Spilosoma quadrilunata (Hampson, 1901)
- Spilosoma rava (Druce, 1898)
- Spilosoma sulphurea Bartel, 1903
- Spilosoma togoensis Bartel, 1903
- Teracotona buryi Rothschild, 1910
- Utetheisa pulchella (Linnaeus, 1758)
- Zobida trinitas (Strand, 1912)

== Copromorphidae ==
- Rhynchoferella simplex Strand, 1915

== Cossidae ==
- Cossus fanti Hampson, 1910
- Eulophonotus myrmeleon Felder, 1874
- Phragmataecia sericeata Hampson, 1910
- Xyleutes biatra (Hampson, 1910)

== Crambidae ==
- Aethaloessa floridalis (Zeller, 1852)
- Argyractis accra (Strand, 1913)
- Chalcidoptera argyrophoralis Hampson, 1912
- Charltona albimixtalis Hampson, 1919
- Chilo orichalcociliella (Strand, 1911)
- Cirrhochrista grabczewskyi E. Hering, 1903
- Conotalis aurantifascia (Hampson, 1895)
- Cotachena smaragdina (Butler, 1875)
- Filodes normalis Hampson, 1912
- Haritalodes derogata (Fabricius, 1775)
- Lamprosema pervulgalis (Hampson, 1912)
- Mesolia microdontalis (Hampson, 1919)
- Nausinoe geometralis (Guenée, 1854)
- Obtusipalpis albidalis Hampson, 1919
- Obtusipalpis fusipartalis Hampson, 1919
- Orphanostigma abruptalis (Walker, 1859)
- Phostria hampsonialis Schaus, 1920
- Pilocrocis pterygodia Hampson, 1912
- Platytes duplicilinea (Hampson, 1919)
- Prionotalis peracutella Hampson, 1919
- Psara brunnealis (Hampson, 1913)
- Psara minoralis (Warren, 1892)
- Pseudocatharylla argenticilia (Hampson, 1919)
- Pseudocatharylla peralbellus (Hampson, 1919)
- Pyrausta violascens Hampson, 1918
- Sufetula trichophysetis Hampson, 1912
- Ulopeza conigeralis Zeller, 1852

== Drepanidae ==
- Epicampoptera ivoirensis Watson, 1965
- Isospidia angustipennis (Warren, 1904)
- Negera bimaculata (Holland, 1893)
- Negera confusa Walker, 1855
- Negera disspinosa Watson, 1965
- Negera natalensis (Felder, 1874)
- Spidia fenestrata Butler, 1878
- Uranometra oculata (Holland, 1893)

== Elachistidae ==
- Ethmia livida (Zeller, 1852)
- Ethmia oculigera (Möschler, 1883)
- Ptilobola inornatella (Walsingham, 1891)

== Eupterotidae ==
- Acrojana rosacea Butler, 1874
- Acrojana splendida Rothschild, 1917
- Hoplojana soricis Rothschild, 1917
- Jana eurymas Herrich-Schäffer, 1854
- Jana gracilis Walker, 1855
- Jana obscura Aurivillius, 1893
- Stenoglene plagiatus (Aurivillius, 1911)

== Gelechiidae ==
- Prasodryas fracticostella (Walsingham, 1891)

== Geometridae ==
- Acrostatheusis apicitincta Prout, 1915
- Aletis helcita (Linnaeus, 1763)
- Allochrostes impunctata (Warren, 1897)
- Antharmostes interalbicans Warren, 1902
- Aphilopota cardinalli Prout, 1954
- Aphilopota statuta Prout, 1954
- Cartaletis gracilis (Möschler, 1887)
- Chiasmia albivia (Prout, 1915)
- Chiasmia feraliata (Guenée, 1858)
- Chiasmia impar (Warren, 1897)
- Chiasmia majestica (Warren, 1901)
- Coenina aurivena Butler, 1898
- Comostolopsis stillata (Felder & Rogenhofer, 1875)
- Cyclophora sublunata (Swinhoe, 1904)
- Epicosymbia chrysoparalias (Prout, 1917)
- Epigynopteryx ansorgei (Warren, 1901)
- Ereunetea flava Warren, 1909
- Gelasmodes fasciata (Warren, 1899)
- Geodena partita Swinhoe, 1904
- Geodena surrendra Swinhoe, 1904
- Heterostegane monilifera Prout, 1915
- Idaea prucholoma (Prout, 1932)
- Isturgia catalaunaria (Guenée, 1858)
- Lophostola cara Prout, 1913
- Malgassapeira mixtilinea (Warren, 1909)
- Melinoessa aemonia (Swinhoe, 1904)
- Melinoessa aureola Prout, 1934
- Mixocera albimargo Warren, 1901
- Narthecusa tenuiorata Walker, 1862
- Oedicentra gerydaria Swinhoe, 1904
- Pitthea continua Walker, 1854
- Prasinocyma hadrata (Felder & Rogenhofer, 1875)
- Prasinocyma niveisticta Prout, 1912
- Prasinocyma rhodocycla Prout, 1917
- Prasinocyma rugistrigula Prout, 1912
- Racotis squalida (Butler, 1878)
- Scopula minorata (Boisduval, 1833)
- Somatina accraria Swinhoe, 1904
- Somatina apicipuncta Prout, 1915
- Somatina chalyboeata (Walker, 1869)
- Syncollesis coerulea (Warren, 1896)
- Terina doleris (Plötz, 1880)
- Thetidia undulilinea (Warren, 1905)
- Xenimpia erosa Warren, 1895
- Xenimpia sillaria (Swinhoe, 1904)
- Xylopteryx nacaria (Swinhoe, 1904)
- Zamarada acrochra Prout, 1928
- Zamarada adumbrata D. S. Fletcher, 1974
- Zamarada anacantha D. S. Fletcher, 1974
- Zamarada bicuspida D. S. Fletcher, 1974
- Zamarada corroborata Herbulot, 1954
- Zamarada crystallophana Mabille, 1900
- Zamarada cucharita D. S. Fletcher, 1974
- Zamarada cydippe Herbulot, 1954
- Zamarada dentigera Warren, 1909
- Zamarada dilucida Warren, 1909
- Zamarada dolorosa D. S. Fletcher, 1974
- Zamarada dyscapna D. S. Fletcher, 1974
- Zamarada eucharis (Drury, 1782)
- Zamarada euerces Prout, 1928
- Zamarada euphrosyne Oberthür, 1912
- Zamarada flavicosta Warren, 1897
- Zamarada ignicosta Prout, 1912
- Zamarada indicata D. S. Fletcher, 1974
- Zamarada leona Gaede, 1915
- Zamarada lepta D. S. Fletcher, 1974
- Zamarada melanopyga Herbulot, 1954
- Zamarada melpomene Oberthür, 1912
- Zamarada mimesis D. S. Fletcher, 1974
- Zamarada nasuta Warren, 1897
- Zamarada paxilla D. S. Fletcher, 1974
- Zamarada perlepidata (Walker, 1863)
- Zamarada protrusa Warren, 1897
- Zamarada reflexaria (Walker, 1863)
- Zamarada regularis D. S. Fletcher, 1974
- Zamarada vigilans Prout, 1915
- Zamarada vulpina Warren, 1897

== Gracillariidae ==
- Caloptilia pseudoaurita Triberti, 1989
- Stomphastis thraustica (Meyrick, 1908)

== Lasiocampidae ==
- Euphorea ondulosa (Conte, 1909)
- Filiola dogma Zolotuhin & Gurkovich, 2009
- Filiola fulgurata (Aurivillius, 1909)
- Gastroplakaeis delicatulus Aurivillius, 1911
- Gastroplakaeis forficulatus (Möschler, 1887)
- Gonometa imperialis Aurivillius, 1915
- Grellada imitans (Aurivillius, 1893)
- Leipoxais dives Aurivillius, 1915
- Leipoxais humfreyi Aurivillius, 1915
- Leipoxais manica Hering, 1928
- Leipoxais proboscidea (Guérin-Méneville, 1832)
- Odontocheilopteryx haribda Gurkovich & Zolotuhin, 2009
- Odontocheilopteryx pattersoni Tams, 1926
- Odontocheilopteryx phoneus Hering, 1928
- Odontogama nigricans Aurivillius, 1914
- Opisthodontia spodopasta Tams, 1931
- Pachymeta immunda (Holland, 1893)
- Pachymetana guttata (Aurivillius, 1914)
- Pachyna subfascia (Walker, 1855)
- Pachytrina elygara Zolotuhin & Gurkovich, 2009
- Pachytrina honrathii (Dewitz, 1881)
- Pallastica lateritia (Hering, 1928)
- Pallastica pallens (Bethune-Baker, 1908)
- Philotherma jacchus Möschler, 1887
- Pseudometa choba (Druce, 1899)
- Pseudometa pagetodes Tams, 1929
- Sena cardinalli (Tams, 1931)
- Stoermeriana sjostedti (Aurivillius, 1902)
- Theophasida cardinalli (Tams, 1926)
- Theophasida serafim Zolotuhin & Prozorov, 2010
- Trabala burchardii (Dewitz, 1881)

== Limacodidae ==
- Altha rubrifusalis Hampson, 1910
- Casphalia elegans Jordan, 1915
- Ctenolita argyrobapta Karsch, 1899
- Hadraphe aprica Karsch, 1899
- Hyphorma subterminalis Hampson, 1910
- Latoia albilinea (Hampson, 1910)
- Macroplectra bilineata West, 1940
- Macroplectra fuscifusa Hampson, 1910
- Miresa gilba Karsch, 1899
- Narosa irrorata West, 1940
- Niphadolepis lampra Hering, 1933
- Niphadolepis schultzei Hering, 1932
- Parapluda syngrapha (Hampson, 1910)
- Parasa divisa West, 1940
- Parasa mesochloris Hampson, 1910
- Perola cardinalli (West, 1940)
- Semyrilla lineata (Holland, 1893)
- Sporetolepis argyrolepia (Hampson, 1910)
- Susica molybdea Hampson, 1910
- Zinara recurvata Hampson, 1910

== Lymantriidae ==
- Bracharoa mixta (Snellen, 1872)
- Conigephyra unipunctata (Möschler, 1887)
- Cropera testacea Walker, 1855
- Crorema mentiens Walker, 1855
- Crorema ochracea (Snellen, 1872)
- Dasychira bergmannii (Swinhoe, 1904)
- Dasychira endophaea Hampson, 1910
- Dasychira goodii (Holland, 1893)
- Dasychira hieroglyphica (Swinhoe, 1904)
- Dasychira libella Swinhoe, 1904
- Dasychira punctifera (Walker, 1857)
- Dasychira sordida Möschler, 1887
- Dasychira sphaleroides Hering, 1926
- Dasychira stegmanni Grünberg, 1910
- Dasychira subflava (Walker, 1855)
- Eudasychira dina (Hering, 1926)
- Eudasychira quinquepunctata Möschler, 1887
- Euproctis cryphia Collenette, 1960
- Euproctis fumitincta Hampson, 1910
- Euproctis lepidographa Hampson, 1910
- Euproctis melanopholis Hampson, 1910
- Euproctis pygmaea (Walker, 1855)
- Euproctis rufiterga Hampson, 1910
- Euproctoides acrisia Plötz, 1880
- Griveaudyria ila (Swinhoe, 1904)
- Heteronygmia chismona Swinhoe, 1903
- Heteronygmia manicata (Aurivillius, 1892)
- Laelia atrisquamata Hampson, 1910
- Laelia fracta Schaus & Clements, 1893
- Laelia gigantea Hampson, 1910
- Laelia pheosia (Hampson, 1910)
- Laelia pulcherrima (Hering, 1926)
- Leucoma ogovensis (Holland, 1893)
- Leucoma parva (Plötz, 1880)
- Lomadonta obscura Swinhoe, 1904
- Lomadonta ochriaria Hampson, 1910
- Marblepsis flabellaria (Fabricius, 1787)
- Mylantria xanthospila (Plötz, 1880)
- Naroma signifera Walker, 1856
- Naroma varipes (Walker, 1865)
- Neomardara africana (Holland, 1893)
- Opoboa chrysoparala Collenette, 1932
- Otroeda hesperia (Cramer, 1779)
- Otroeda nerina (Drury, 1780)
- Otroeda planax (Drury, 1780)
- Paqueta chloroscia (Hering, 1926)
- Pseudonotodonta virescens (Möschler, 1887)
- Stracena fuscivena Swinhoe, 1903
- Stracena promelaena (Holland, 1893)

== Metarbelidae ==
- Haberlandia otfriedi Lehmann, 2011
- Haberlandia rohdei Lehmann, 2011
- Metarbela cremorna Hampson, 1920
- Metarbela laguna Hampson, 1920
- Moyencharia ochreicosta (Gaede, 1929)
- Ortharbela diagonalis (Hampson, 1910)
- Salagena fuscata Gaede, 1929

== Noctuidae ==
- Aburina leucocharagma Hampson, 1926
- Aburina phoenocrosmena Hampson, 1926
- Achaea boris (Geyer, 1837)
- Achaea catocaloides Guenée, 1852
- Achaea ezea (Cramer, 1779)
- Achaea faber Holland, 1894
- Achaea indicabilis Walker, 1858
- Achaea jamesoni L. B. Prout, 1919
- Achaea lienardi (Boisduval, 1833)
- Achaea mercatoria (Fabricius, 1775)
- Achaea mormoides Walker, 1858
- Achaea occidens (Hampson, 1913)
- Acontia citrelinea Bethune-Baker, 1911
- Acontia gratiosa Wallengren, 1856
- Acontia hampsoni Hacker, Legrain & Fibiger, 2008
- Acontia hemiselenias (Hampson, 1918)
- Acontia imitatrix Wallengren, 1856
- Acontia insocia (Walker, 1857)
- Acontia nigrimacula Hacker, Legrain & Fibiger, 2008
- Acontia porphyrea (Butler, 1898)
- Acontia transfigurata Wallengren, 1856
- Acontia veroxanthia Hacker, Legrain & Fibiger, 2010
- Acontia wahlbergi Wallengren, 1856
- Aegocera rectilinea Boisduval, 1836
- Aegocera tigrina (Druce, 1882)
- Amyna punctum (Fabricius, 1794)
- Andobana multipunctata (Druce, 1899)
- Androlymnia torsivena (Hampson, 1902)
- Anigraea purpurascens Hampson, 1912
- Anoba glyphica (Bethune-Baker, 1911)
- Anoba sinuata (Fabricius, 1775)
- Anomis endochlora Hampson, 1926
- Antarchaea signifera Hampson, 1926
- Anticarsia albilineata Hampson, 1926
- Argyrogramma signata (Fabricius, 1775)
- Asota speciosa (Drury, 1773)
- Athyrma discimacula Hampson, 1926
- Audea endophaea Hampson, 1913
- Audea kathrina Kühne, 2005
- Audea paulumnodosa Kühne, 2005
- Avitta atripuncta Hampson, 1926
- Baniopis pulverea Hampson, 1926
- Belciana euchlora Hampson, 1926
- Blasticorhinus trichopoda Hampson, 1926
- Brevipecten politzari Hacker & Fibiger, 2007
- Calligraphidia opulenta (Möschler, 1887)
- Callixena versicolora Saalmüller, 1891
- Caryonopera conifera Hampson, 1926
- Catephia cryptodisca Hampson, 1926
- Catephia dipterygia Hampson, 1926
- Catephia endoplaga Hampson, 1926
- Cautatha phoenicea Hampson, 1910
- Cerynea flavibasalis Hampson, 1910
- Cerynea trichobasis Hampson, 1910
- Colbusa euclidica Walker, 1865
- Corgatha enispodes Hampson, 1910
- Corgatha macariodes Hampson, 1910
- Corgatha ozolica Hampson, 1910
- Corgatha regula Gaede, 1916
- Crameria amabilis (Drury, 1773)
- Crypsotidia mesosema Hampson, 1913
- Crypsotidia remanei Wiltshire, 1977
- Cyligramma amblyops Mabille, 1891
- Cyligramma latona (Cramer, 1775)
- Digama budonga Bethune-Baker, 1913
- Digama costimacula Swinhoe, 1907
- Drepanophiletis castaneata Hampson, 1926
- Dysgonia conjunctura (Walker, 1858)
- Dysgonia derogans (Walker, 1858)
- Dysgonia palpalis (Walker, 1865)
- Dysgonia pudica (Möschler, 1887)
- Dysgonia rectivia (Hampson, 1913)
- Dysgonia torrida (Guenée, 1852)
- Egnasia microsema Hampson, 1926
- Enispa albicosta Hampson, 1910
- Enispa atriceps Hampson, 1910
- Enmonodiops ochrodiscata Hampson, 1926
- Ercheia subsignata (Walker, 1865)
- Erebus walkeri (Butler, 1875)
- Eublemma albicosta Hampson, 1910
- Eublemma albifascia Hampson, 1910
- Eublemma anachoresis (Wallengren, 1863)
- Eublemma atrifusa Hampson, 1910
- Eublemma aurantiaca Hampson, 1910
- Eublemma cochylioides (Guenée, 1852)
- Eublemma exigua (Walker, 1858)
- Eublemma ragusana (Freyer, 1844)
- Eublemma scitula (Rambur, 1833)
- Eudrapa metathermeola Hampson, 1926
- Eudrapa mollis Walker, 1857
- Euippodes euprepes Hampson, 1926
- Euminucia conflua Hampson, 1913
- Euminucia orthogona Hampson, 1913
- Eutelia distorta Hampson, 1912
- Eutelia poliochroa Hampson, 1912
- Eutelia subrubens (Mabille, 1890)
- Eutelia symphonica Hampson, 1902
- Exophyla melanocleis Hampson, 1926
- Feliniopsis africana (Schaus & Clements, 1893)
- Feliniopsis grisea (Laporte, 1973)
- Feliniopsis gueneei (Laporte, 1973)
- Feliniopsis hosplitoides (Laporte, 1979)
- Feliniopsis laportei Hacker & Fibiger, 2007
- Feliniopsis nigribarbata (Hampson, 1908)
- Focillopis eclipsia Hampson, 1926
- Gonelydna acutangula Hampson, 1910
- Gonioscia meroleuca Hampson, 1926
- Haemaphlebia atripalpis Hampson, 1910
- Hamodes simplicia Weymer, 1892
- Helicoverpa assulta (Guenée, 1852)
- Heliophisma catocalina Holland, 1894
- Heliophisma klugii (Boisduval, 1833)
- Heraclia aemulatrix (Westwood, 1881)
- Heraclia longipennis (Walker, 1854)
- Heraclia medeba (Druce, 1880)
- Heraclia pallida (Walker, 1854)
- Herpeperas atrapex Hampson, 1926
- Hollandia spurrelli Hampson, 1926
- Holocryptis albida Hampson, 1918
- Hypena obacerralis Walker, [1859]
- Hypopyra capensis Herrich-Schäffer, 1854
- Hypotacha ochribasalis (Hampson, 1896)
- Iambiodes incerta (Rothschild, 1913)
- Isadelphina lacteifascia Hampson, 1926
- Leucania metasarca (Hampson, 1907)
- Libystica crenata Hampson, 1926
- Lobophyllodes miniatus (Grünberg, 1907)
- Lophiophora fulminans Bryk, 1915
- Lophodaxa labandina Hampson, 1926
- Lophoptera litigiosa (Boisduval, 1833)
- Lophoruza semiscripta (Mabille, 1893)
- Loxioda alternans Hampson, 1926
- Marathyssa cuneata (Saalmüller, 1891)
- Marcipa amaba Hampson, 1926
- Marcipa argyrosema Hampson, 1926
- Marcipa disrupta Hampson, 1926
- Marcipa endoselene Hampson, 1926
- Marcipa magniplaga Hampson, 1926
- Marcipa monosema Hampson, 1926
- Marcipa ruptisigna Hampson, 1926
- Marcipalina confluens (Hampson, 1926)
- Marcipalina melanoconia (Hampson, 1926)
- Masalia albiseriata (Druce, 1903)
- Masalia bimaculata (Moore, 1888)
- Masalia decorata (Moore, 1881)
- Masalia flaviceps (Hampson, 1903)
- Masalia flavistrigata (Hampson, 1903)
- Masalia galatheae (Wallengren, 1856)
- Masalia nubila (Hampson, 1903)
- Masalia rubristria (Hampson, 1903)
- Massaga hesparia (Cramer, 1775)
- Massaga maritona Butler, 1868
- Massaga noncoba Kiriakoff, 1974
- Maxera euryptera Hampson, 1926
- Mazuca haemagrapha Hampson, 1910
- Mecodina apicia Hampson, 1926
- Mecodina nigripuncta Hampson, 1926
- Mecodopsis conisema Hampson, 1926
- Mesosciera typica Hampson, 1926
- Metagarista maenas (Herrich-Schäffer, 1853)
- Metagarista triphaenoides Walker, 1854
- Micraxylia nyei Berio, 1964
- Mimasura miltochristodes Hampson, 1918
- Miniodes discolor Guenée, 1852
- Miniodes phaeosoma Hampson, 1913
- Mitrophrys magna (Walker, 1854)
- Mocis mayeri (Boisduval, 1833)
- Mocis proverai Zilli, 2000
- Mythimna languida (Walker, 1858)
- Nagia homotona Hampson, 1926
- Nagia microsema Hampson, 1926
- Nagia monosema Hampson, 1926
- Oglasa annulisigna Hampson, 1926
- Oglasa atristipata Hampson, 1926
- Oglasa aulota Hampson, 1926
- Oglasa diagonalis Hampson, 1926
- Oglasa griselda Hampson, 1926
- Oglasa microsema Hampson, 1926
- Oglasa parallela Hampson, 1926
- Oglasa phaeonephele Hampson, 1926
- Oglasodes atrisignata Hampson, 1926
- Oglasodes bisinuata Hampson, 1926
- Ogovia aliena (Holland, 1920)
- Oligia hypothermes Hampson, 1908
- Ophiusa conspicienda (Walker, 1858)
- Ophiusa recurvata (Hampson, 1913)
- Ophiusa subdiversa (L. B. Prout, 1919)
- Oraesia cerne (Fawcett, 1916)
- Oruza divisa (Walker, 1862)
- Ozarba domina (Holland, 1894)
- Ozarba ochrozona Hampson, 1910
- Pangrapta elassa Hampson, 1926
- Paralephana flavilinea Hampson, 1926
- Paralephana incurvata Hampson, 1926
- Paralephana monogona Hampson, 1926
- Paralephana nigripalpis Hampson, 1926
- Paralephana obliqua Hampson, 1926
- Paralephana sarcochroa Hampson, 1926
- Parallelura palumbiodes (Hampson, 1902)
- Pericyma mendax (Walker, 1858)
- Phaegorista leucomelas (Herrich-Schäffer, 1855)
- Phaegorista similis Walker, 1869
- Platyscia mesoscia Hampson, 1926
- Plusia microstigma Hampson, 1910
- Plusiodonta ionochrota Hampson, 1926
- Plusiophaes scotaea (Hampson, 1926)
- Polygrapta argyropasta Hampson, 1926
- Polytelodes florifera (Walker, 1858)
- Prolymnia viola Hampson, 1911
- Pseudoarcte melanis (Mabille, 1890)
- Pseudogiria hypographa (Hampson, 1926)
- Pseudomicrodes polysticta Hampson, 1910
- Rhynchina leucodonta Hampson, 1910
- Rivula erebina Hampson, 1926
- Rougeotiana xanthoperas (Hampson, 1926)
- Sarothroceras banaka (Plötz, 1880)
- Schausia gladiatoria (Holland, 1893)
- Simplicia extinctalis (Zeller, 1852)
- Spodoptera exempta (Walker, 1857)
- Spodoptera exigua (Hübner, 1808)
- Strongylosia semiflava Hampson, 1926
- Sypnoides equatorialis (Holland, 1894)
- Taviodes discomma Hampson, 1926
- Thiacidas berenice (Fawcett, 1916)
- Thiacidas schausi (Hampson, 1905)
- Thiacidas stassarti Hacker & Zilli, 2007
- Thyas metaphaea (Hampson, 1913)
- Thyas parallelipipeda (Guenée, 1852)
- Thyas rubricata (Holland, 1894)
- Toana craspedica Hampson, 1910
- Tolna macrosema Hampson, 1913
- Tolna sypnoides (Butler, 1878)
- Trachea euryscia Hampson, 1918
- Trichoplusia orichalcea (Fabricius, 1775)
- Trigonodes hyppasia (Cramer, 1779)
- Tuerta chrysochlora Walker, 1869
- Ugiodes cinerea Hampson, 1926
- Zethesides pusilla Hampson, 1926

== Nolidae ==
- Aiteta paralella Hampson, 1912
- Bryophilopsis anomoiota (Bethune-Baker, 1911)
- Bryophilopsis cometes Hampson, 1912
- Chlorozada endophaea Hampson, 1912
- Chlorozada pyrites Hampson, 1912
- Earias ogovana Holland, 1893
- Giaura plumbeofusa Hampson, 1920
- Gigantoceras rectilinea Hampson, 1912
- Gigantoceras solstitialis Holland, 1893
- Iscadia glaucograpta (Hampson, 1912)
- Leocyma camilla (Druce, 1887)
- Leocyma discophora Hampson, 1912
- Lophocrama phoenicochlora Hampson, 1912
- Metaleptina albibasis Holland, 1893
- Metaleptina obliterata Holland, 1893
- Microzada anaemica Hampson, 1912
- Negeta mesoleuca (Holland, 1894)
- Negeta molybdota Hampson, 1912
- Negeta purpurascens Hampson, 1912
- Negeta semialba Hampson, 1918
- Neonegeta atriflava Hampson, 1912
- Neonegeta pollusca (Schaus, 1893)
- Neonegeta purpurea Hampson, 1912
- Nola apicalis (Hampson, 1903)
- Nola argyropasta (Hampson, 1914)
- Nola chionea Hampson, 1911
- Nola cretaceoides Poole, 1989
- Nola endoscota Hampson, 1914
- Nola foviferoides Poole, 1989
- Nola melalopha (Hampson, 1900)
- Nola melanoscelis (Hampson, 1914)
- Nola mesonephele (Hampson, 1914)
- Nola mesothermoides Poole, 1989
- Nola microlopha (Hampson, 1900)
- Nola phaeocraspis (Hampson, 1909)
- Nola tornalis (Hampson, 1914)
- Odontestis cyphonota Hampson, 1912
- Odontestis prosticta (Holland, 1894)
- Pardasena lativia Hampson, 1912
- Pardoxia graellsii (Feisthamel, 1837)
- Periplusia nubilicosta Holland, 1894
- Petrinia lignosa Walker, 1869
- Selepa cumasia Hampson, 1912
- Westermannia cuprea Hampson, 1905

== Notodontidae ==
- Afropteryx angulata (Gaede, 1928)
- Amphiphalera leuconephra Hampson, 1910
- Andocidia tabernaria Kiriakoff, 1958
- Antheua amphiaraus (Kiriakoff, 1955)
- Antheua delicata Bethune-Baker, 1911
- Antheua elongata Gaede, 1928
- Antheua extenuata Walker, 1869
- Antheua ruficosta (Hampson, 1910)
- Antheua trifasciata (Hampson, 1909)
- Antheua vittata (Walker, 1855)
- Arciera nigripuncta (Rothschild, 1917)
- Arciera sexpunctata Kiriakoff, 1979
- Bisolita minuta (Holland, 1893)
- Brachychira excellens (Rothschild, 1917)
- Catarctia terminipuncta Hampson, 1910
- Daulopaectes trichosa (Hampson, 1910)
- Desmeocraera aquamarina Kiriakoff, 1958
- Desmeocraera bitioides (Holland, 1893)
- Desmeocraera confluens Gaede, 1928
- Desmeocraera leucophaea Gaede, 1928
- Desmeocraera sagittata Gaede, 1928
- Desmeocraera sincera Kiriakoff, 1958
- Desmeocraerula pallida Kiriakoff, 1963
- Enomotarcha chloana (Holland, 1893)
- Epanaphe parva (Aurivillius, 1891)
- Epicerura pulverulenta (Hampson, 1910)
- Eurystauridia triangularis (Gaede, 1928)
- Lamoriodes metaphaea Hampson, 1910
- Macronadata collaris Möschler, 1887
- Odontoperas aureomixta Kiriakoff, 1959
- Paradiastema pulverea Hampson, 1910
- Polienus rubritincta (Hampson, 1910)
- Psalisodes leuca (Hampson, 1910)
- Scalmicauda evadne Kiriakoff, 1979
- Scalmicauda melasema Kiriakoff, 1959
- Scalmicauda molestula Kiriakoff, 1959
- Scalmicauda terminalis Kiriakoff, 1959
- Scrancia atrifasciata Gaede, 1928
- Scrancia lactea Gaede, 1928
- Scranciola habilis Kiriakoff, 1965
- Synete argentescens (Hampson, 1910)
- Synete subarcuata Kiriakoff, 1979
- Trabanta rufisquamata (Hampson, 1910)
- Xanthodonta isabellina Kiriakoff, 1979
- Xanthodonta minima (Hampson, 1910)

== Psychidae ==
- Eumeta cervina Druce, 1887
- Eumeta rougeoti Bourgogne, 1955

== Pterophoridae ==
- Exelastis ebalensis (Rebel, 1907)
- Pterophorus candidalis (Walker, 1864)
- Pterophorus spissa (Bigot, 1969)
- Walsinghamiella eques (Walsingham, 1891)
- Xyroptila africana Bigot, 1969

== Pyralidae ==
- Eldana saccharina Walker, 1865
- Ematheudes straminella Snellen, 1872
- Endotricha consobrinalis Zeller, 1852
- Endotricha vinolentalis Ragonot, 1891
- Gauna pyralodes (Hampson, 1916)
- Lepidogma melanospila Hampson, 1916
- Macalla olivaris Hampson, 1916
- Perula apicalis (Hampson, 1916)
- Rhynchopaschia virescens Hampson, 1916
- Triphassa flavifrons (Warren, 1892)

== Saturniidae ==
- Aurivillius arata (Westwood, 1849)
- Bunaeopsis macrophthalma (Kirby, 1881)
- Carnegia mirabilis (Aurivillius, 1895)
- Epiphora albidus (Druce, 1886)
- Epiphora lineata (Bouvier, 1930)
- Epiphora vacuna (Westwood, 1849)
- Gonimbrasia occidentalis Rothschild, 1907
- Goodia hierax Jordan, 1922
- Holocerina angulata (Aurivillius, 1893)
- Lobobunaea melanoneura (Rothschild, 1907)
- Lobobunaea phaedusa (Drury, 1782)
- Ludia obscura Aurivillius, 1893
- Micragone nubifera Bouvier, 1936
- Nudaurelia dione (Fabricius, 1793)
- Nudaurelia eblis Strecker, 1876
- Nudaurelia emini (Butler, 1888)
- Nudaurelia xanthomma (Rothschild, 1907)
- Orthogonioptilum brunneum Jordan, 1922
- Orthogonioptilum deletum Jordan, 1922
- Orthogonioptilum prox Karsch, 1892
- Orthogonioptilum vestigiata (Holland, 1893)
- Pseudantheraea discrepans (Butler, 1878)

== Sesiidae ==
- Barbasphecia ares Pühringer & Sáfián, 2011
- Barbasphecia hephaistos Pühringer & Sáfián, 2011
- Episannina albifrons (Hampson, 1910)
- Episannina flavicincta Hampson, 1919
- Melittia chalconota Hampson, 1910
- Sphecosesia brachyptera Hampson, 1919
- Synanthedon auripes (Hampson, 1910)
- Synanthedon exochiformis (Walker, 1856)
- Synanthedon flavipectus (Hampson, 1910)

== Sphingidae ==
- Antinephele anomala (Butler, 1882)
- Antinephele muscosa Holland, 1889
- Chloroclanis virescens (Butler, 1882)
- Falcatula cymatodes (Rothschild & Jordan, 1912)
- Hippotion aporodes Rothschild & Jordan, 1912
- Hypaedalea butleri Rothschild, 1894
- Leucophlebia afra Karsch, 1891
- Lophostethus dumolinii (Angas, 1849)
- Neopolyptychus ancylus (Rothschild & Jordan, 1916)
- Neopolyptychus spurrelli (Rothschild & Jordan, 1912)
- Nephele discifera Karsch, 1891
- Nephele peneus (Cramer, 1776)
- Phylloxiphia bicolor (Rothschild, 1894)
- Phylloxiphia illustris (Rothschild & Jordan, 1906)
- Platysphinx constrigilis (Walker, 1869)
- Platysphinx phyllis Rothschild & Jordan, 1903
- Platysphinx stigmatica (Mabille, 1878)
- Platysphinx vicaria Jordan, 1920
- Polyptychus andosa Walker, 1856
- Polyptychus carteri (Butler, 1882)
- Polyptychus hollandi Rothschild & Jordan, 1903
- Polyptychus lapidatus Joicey & Kaye, 1917
- Polyptychus murinus Rothschild, 1904
- Polyptychus orthographus Rothschild & Jordan, 1903
- Polyptychus paupercula (Holland, 1889)
- Polyptychus retusus Rothschild & Jordan, 1908
- Pseudopolyptychus foliaceus (Rothschild & Jordan, 1903)
- Temnora iapygoides (Holland, 1889)
- Theretra jugurtha (Boisduval, 1875)
- Theretra perkeo Rothschild & Jordan, 1903

== Thyrididae ==
- Banisia fuliginea (Whalley, 1971)
- Banisia inoptata (Whalley, 1971)
- Byblisia setipes (Plötz, 1880)
- Cecidothyris chrysotherma (Hampson, 1914)
- Cecidothyris tyrannica Whalley, 1971
- Dysodia vitrina (Boisduval, 1829)
- Epaena candida Whalley, 1971
- Heteroschista nigranalis Warren, 1903
- Marmax hyparchus (Cramer, 1779)
- Marmax vicaria (Walker, 1854)
- Nemea eugrapha (Hampson, 1906)
- Ninia plumipes (Drury, 1782)
- Opula perigrapha (Hampson, 1914)
- Rhodoneura sordidula (Plötz, 1880)
- Striglina clathrata (Hampson, 1897)

== Tineidae ==
- Acridotarsa melipecta (Meyrick, 1915)
- Afrocelestis sacculata Gozmány, 1968
- Ceratophaga vastellus (Zeller, 1852)
- Cimitra fetialis (Meyrick, 1917)
- Edosa endroedyi (Gozmány, 1966)
- Erechthias travestita (Gozmány, 1968)
- Hyperbola pastoralis (Meyrick, 1931)
- Monopis addenda Gozmány, 1965
- Monopis immaculata Gozmány, 1967
- Monopis megalodelta Meyrick, 1908
- Monopis ministrans Gozmány, 1968
- Monopis rejectella (Walker, 1864)
- Morophaga soror Gozmány, 1965
- Organodesma leucomicra (Gozmány, 1966)
- Perissomastix sericea Gozmány, 1966
- Perissomastix stibarodes (Meyrick, 1908)
- Perissomastix styx Gozmány, 1966
- Phereoeca praecox Gozmány & Vári, 1973
- Phereoeca proletaria (Meyrick, 1921)
- Phthoropoea oenochares (Meyrick, 1920)
- Silosca licziae Gozmány, 1967
- Sphallestasis spinifurca (Gozmány, 1969)
- Syncalipsis optania (Meyrick, 1908)
- Syncalipsis scotochrysis Gozmány, 1969
- Syncalipsis typhodes (Meyrick, 1917)
- Tiquadra cultrifera Meyrick, 1914
- Tiquadra goochii Walsingham, 1881

== Tortricidae ==
- Accra viridis (Walsingham, 1891)
- Afroploce karsholti Aarvik, 2004
- Bactra aletha Diakonoff, 1963
- Coccothera ferrifracta Diakonoff, 1968
- Cydia taocosma (Meyrick, 1914)
- Eccopsis incultana (Walker, 1863)
- Eccopsis wahlbergiana Zeller, 1852
- Eupoecilia aburica Razowski, 1993
- Olethreutes molybdachtha (Meyrick, 1930)
- Tortrix dinota Meyrick, 1918
- Xeneboda kumasiana Razowski & Tuck, 2000

== Uraniidae ==
- Acropteris costinigrata Warren, 1897

== Xyloryctidae ==
- Eretmocera scatospila Zeller, 1852
