= Ortharbela albivenata =

Scientific classification
- Kingdom: Animalia
- Phylum: Arthropoda
- Class: Insecta
- Order: Lepidoptera
- Family: Cossidae
- Genus: Ortharbela
- Species: O. albivenata

Binomial name
- Ortharbela albivenata (Hampson, 1910)

Synonyms
- Arbelodes albivenata Hampson, 1910

Species of moth

Ortharbela albivenata is a moth in the family Cossidae. It is found in South Africa.
