= Episannina zygaenura =

Scientific classification
- Kingdom: Animalia
- Phylum: Arthropoda
- Class: Insecta
- Order: Lepidoptera
- Family: Sesiidae
- Genus: Episannina
- Species: E. zygaenura

Binomial name
- Episannina zygaenura Meyrick, 1933

Species of moth

Episannina zygaenura is a moth of the family Sesiidae. It is known from Sierra Leone.
