= Ortharbela =

Scientific classification
- Domain: Eukaryota
- Kingdom: Animalia
- Phylum: Arthropoda
- Class: Insecta
- Order: Lepidoptera
- Family: Cossidae
- Subfamily: Metarbelinae
- Genus: Ortharbela; Aurivillius, 1910

Genus of moths

Ortharbela is a genus of moths in the family Cossidae.

== Species ==
- Ortharbela albivenata (Hampson, 1910)
- Ortharbela bisinuata (Hampson, 1920)
- Ortharbela castanea Gaede, 1929
- Ortharbela cliftoni Lehmann, 2009
- Ortharbela diagonalis (Hampson, 1910)
- Ortharbela guttata Aurivillius, 1910
- Ortharbela jurateae Lehmann, 2009
- Ortharbela minima (Hampson, 1920)
- Ortharbela obliquifascia (Hampson, 1910)
- Ortharbela rufula (Hampson, 1910)
- Ortharbela semifasciata Gaede, 1929
- Ortharbela sommerlattei Lehmann, 2008
- Ortharbela tetrasticta (Hampson, 1910)
