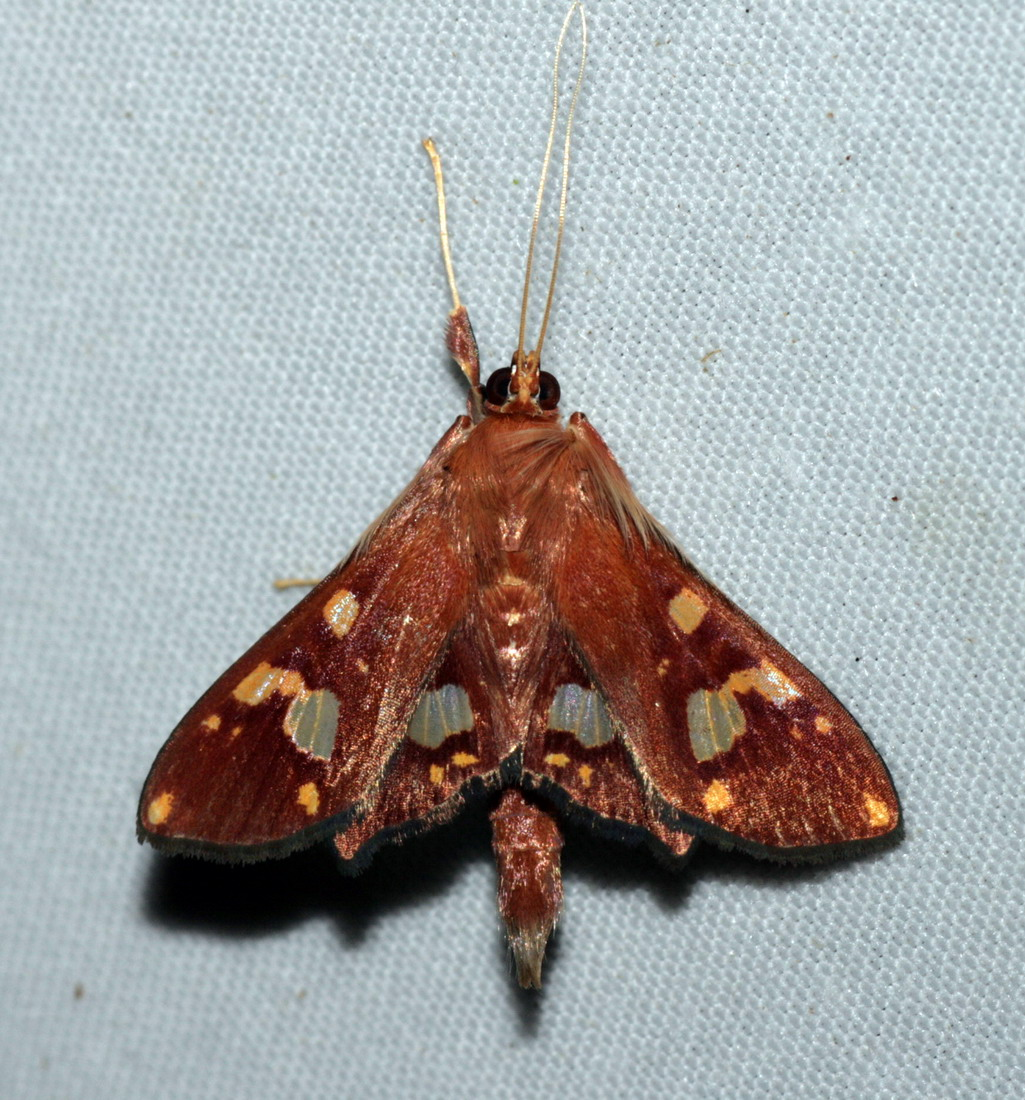
- Male

Scientific classification
- Kingdom: Animalia
- Phylum: Arthropoda
- Clade: Pancrustacea
- Class: Insecta
- Order: Lepidoptera
- Family: Crambidae
- Genus: Chalcidoptera
- Species: C. emissalis

Binomial name
- Chalcidoptera emissalis Walker, [1866]

Synonyms
- Analthes crinipes C. Felder, R. Felder & Rogenhofer, 1875; Analthes pyrrhocosma Meyrick, 1894; Chalcidoptera rubra Butler, 1887

= Chalcidoptera emissalis =

Species of moth

Chalcidoptera emissalis is a moth in the family Crambidae. It was described by Francis Walker in 1866. It is found in north-eastern India, Sri Lanka, Burma, Singapore, Borneo, Ambon Island, Aru, New Guinea and Australia, where it has been recorded from Queensland.
