= Prionotalis balia =

Scientific classification
- Kingdom: Animalia
- Phylum: Arthropoda
- Clade: Pancrustacea
- Class: Insecta
- Order: Lepidoptera
- Family: Crambidae
- Subfamily: Crambinae
- Tribe: Ancylolomiini
- Genus: Prionotalis
- Species: P. balia

Binomial name
- Prionotalis balia (Tams, 1932)

Synonyms
- Charltona balia Tams, 1932; Conotalis phacodes Meyrick, 1934

Species of moth

Prionotalis balia is a moth in the family Crambidae. It was described by Willie Horace Thomas Tams in 1932. It is found in the Democratic Republic of Congo and Kenya.
