= Logunovium scortillum =

Scientific classification
- Kingdom: Animalia
- Phylum: Arthropoda
- Class: Insecta
- Order: Lepidoptera
- Superfamily: Noctuoidea
- Family: Erebidae
- Subfamily: Arctiinae
- Genus: Logunovium
- Species: L. scortillum

Binomial name
- Logunovium scortillum (Wallengren, 1875)

Synonyms
- Spilosoma scortillum Wallengren, 1875; Logunovium scortillum scontilla (Strand, 1919); Estigmene costalis Kiriakoff, 1954

Species of moth

Logunovium scortillum is a moth of the family Erebidae. It was described by Wallengren in 1875. It is found in Angola, Cameroon, the Democratic Republic of Congo, Gabon, Lesotho, Malawi, Nigeria, South Africa and Zimbabwe.

== Subspecies ==
- Logunovium scortillum scortillum
- Logunovium scortillum costalis (Kiriakoff, 1954) (Democratic Republic of Congo)
