= Menegites =

Scientific classification
- Domain: Eukaryota
- Kingdom: Animalia
- Phylum: Arthropoda
- Class: Insecta
- Order: Lepidoptera
- Superfamily: Noctuoidea
- Family: Erebidae
- Subfamily: Arctiinae
- Subtribe: Spilosomina
- Genus: Menegites; Kiriakoff, 1954

Type species
- Menegites nivea Kiriakoff, 1954

Genus of moths

Menegites is a genus of moth in the family Erebidae from the Afrotropics.

== Species ==
- Menegites nivea Kiriakoff, 1954
- Menegites sulphurea (Bartel, 1903)
