= Paremonia =

Scientific classification
- Kingdom: Animalia
- Phylum: Arthropoda
- Class: Insecta
- Order: Lepidoptera
- Superfamily: Noctuoidea
- Family: Erebidae
- Subfamily: Arctiinae
- Tribe: Lithosiini
- Genus: Paremonia; Hampson, 1900

Genus of moths

Paremonia is a genus of moths in the subfamily Arctiinae.

== Species ==
- Paremonia argentata Hampson, 1914
- Paremonia luteicincta Holland, 1893
