= Chalcidoptera alimenalis =

Scientific classification
- Kingdom: Animalia
- Phylum: Arthropoda
- Clade: Pancrustacea
- Class: Insecta
- Order: Lepidoptera
- Family: Crambidae
- Genus: Chalcidoptera
- Species: C. alimenalis

Binomial name
- Chalcidoptera alimenalis (Walker, 1859)

Synonyms
- Hymenia alimenalis Walker, 1859

Species of moth

Chalcidoptera alimenalis is a moth in the family Crambidae. It was described by Francis Walker in 1859. It is found in Sierra Leone.
