= Chalcidoptera orbidiscalis =

Scientific classification
- Kingdom: Animalia
- Phylum: Arthropoda
- Clade: Pancrustacea
- Class: Insecta
- Order: Lepidoptera
- Family: Crambidae
- Genus: Chalcidoptera
- Species: C. orbidiscalis

Binomial name
- Chalcidoptera orbidiscalis Hampson, 1918

Species of moth

Chalcidoptera orbidiscalis is a moth in the family Crambidae. It was described by George Hampson in 1918. It is found in Cameroon.
