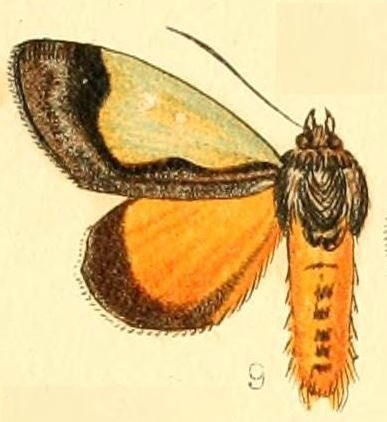
- Tuerta chrysochlora

Scientific classification
- Kingdom: Animalia
- Phylum: Arthropoda
- Class: Insecta
- Order: Lepidoptera
- Superfamily: Noctuoidea
- Family: Noctuidae
- Subfamily: Agaristinae
- Genus: Tuerta; Walker, 1869

= Tuerta =

Genus of moths

Tuerta is a genus of moths of the family Noctuidae. The genus was erected by Francis Walker in 1869.

== Species ==
- Tuerta chrysochlora Walker, 1869
- Tuerta cyanopasta Hampson, 1907
- Tuerta pastocyana Berio, 1940
