= Accra kassaicola =

Scientific classification
- Kingdom: Animalia
- Phylum: Arthropoda
- Class: Insecta
- Order: Lepidoptera
- Family: Tortricidae
- Genus: Accra
- Species: A. kassaicola

Binomial name
- Accra kassaicola Razowski, 2005

Species of moth

Accra kassaicola is a species of moth of the family Tortricidae. It is found in the Democratic Republic of Congo.

The wingspan is 11.5–12 mm.
