= Chalcidoptera bilunalis =

Scientific classification
- Kingdom: Animalia
- Phylum: Arthropoda
- Clade: Pancrustacea
- Class: Insecta
- Order: Lepidoptera
- Family: Crambidae
- Genus: Chalcidoptera
- Species: C. bilunalis

Binomial name
- Chalcidoptera bilunalis Hampson, 1899

Species of moth

Chalcidoptera bilunalis is a moth in the family Crambidae. It was described by George Hampson in 1899. It is found in Sierra Leone.
