= Prionotalis =

Scientific classification
- Kingdom: Animalia
- Phylum: Arthropoda
- Clade: Pancrustacea
- Class: Insecta
- Order: Lepidoptera
- Family: Crambidae
- Subfamily: Crambinae
- Tribe: Ancylolomiini
- Genus: Prionotalis; Hampson, 1919

Genus of moths

Prionotalis is a genus of moths of the family Crambidae.

== Species ==
- Prionotalis africanellus (Strand, 1909)
- Prionotalis balia (Tams, 1932)
- Prionotalis friesei Bleszynski, 1963
- Prionotalis peracutella Hampson, 1919
