= Tuerta cyanopasta =

Scientific classification
- Kingdom: Animalia
- Phylum: Arthropoda
- Clade: Pancrustacea
- Class: Insecta
- Order: Lepidoptera
- Superfamily: Noctuoidea
- Family: Noctuidae
- Genus: Tuerta
- Species: T. cyanopasta

Binomial name
- Tuerta cyanopasta Hampson, 1907

Species of moth

Tuerta cyanopasta is a moth of the family Noctuidae. It is found in Kenya.
