= Accra (moth) =

Scientific classification
- Domain: Eukaryota
- Kingdom: Animalia
- Phylum: Arthropoda
- Class: Insecta
- Order: Lepidoptera
- Family: Tortricidae
- Tribe: Tortricini
- Genus: Accra; Razowski, 1964

Synonyms
- Accara Razowski, 1966

Genus of tortrix moths

Accra is a genus of tortrix moths in the subfamily Tortricinae and tribe Tortricini. Accra was established in 1964 by Józef Razowski, with Argyrotoxa viridis as type species.

== Species ==
As of November 2019, the Online World Catalogue of the Tortricidae listed the following species:

- Accra amanica Razowski, 2005
- Accra canthararcha (Meyrick, 1937)
- Accra erythrocyma (Meyrick, 1930)
- Accra kassaicola Razowski, 2005
- Accra kikuayana Razowski, 2005
- Accra ornata Razowski, 1966
- Accra plumbeana Razowski, 1966
- Accra rubicunda Razowski, 1966
- Accra rubrothicta Razowski, 1986
- Accra tanzanica Razowski, 1990
- Accra venatrix (Meyrick, 1930)
- Accra viridis (Walsingham, 1891) - type species (as Argyrotoxa viridis)
- Accra witteae Razowski, 1964

== See also ==
- List of Tortricidae genera
