= Accra rubicunda =

Scientific classification
- Kingdom: Animalia
- Phylum: Arthropoda
- Class: Insecta
- Order: Lepidoptera
- Family: Tortricidae
- Genus: Accra
- Species: A. rubicunda

Binomial name
- Accra rubicunda Razowski, 1966

Species of moth

Accra rubicunda is a species of moth of the family Tortricidae first described by Józef Razowski in 1966. It is found in the Democratic Republic of the Congo.
