= Ortharbela castanea =

Scientific classification
- Kingdom: Animalia
- Phylum: Arthropoda
- Class: Insecta
- Order: Lepidoptera
- Family: Cossidae
- Genus: Ortharbela
- Species: O. castanea

Binomial name
- Ortharbela castanea Gaede, 1929

Species of moth

Ortharbela castanea is a moth in the family Cossidae. It is found in Cameroon.
