= Chalcidoptera rufilinealis =

Scientific classification
- Kingdom: Animalia
- Phylum: Arthropoda
- Clade: Pancrustacea
- Class: Insecta
- Order: Lepidoptera
- Family: Crambidae
- Genus: Chalcidoptera
- Species: C. rufilinealis

Binomial name
- Chalcidoptera rufilinealis C. Swinhoe, 1895

Species of moth

Chalcidoptera rufilinealis is a moth in the family Crambidae. It was described by Charles Swinhoe in 1895. It is found in India.
