= Xeneboda =

Scientific classification
- Domain: Eukaryota
- Kingdom: Animalia
- Phylum: Arthropoda
- Class: Insecta
- Order: Lepidoptera
- Family: Tortricidae
- Tribe: Polyorthini
- Genus: Xeneboda; Razowski & Tuck, 2000

Species
- See text

Genus of tortrix moths

Xeneboda is a genus of moths belonging to the family Tortricidae.

== Species ==
- Xeneboda congo Razowski, 2012
- Xeneboda kumasiana Razowski & Tuck, 2000
- Xeneboda mayumbea Razowski, 2012
