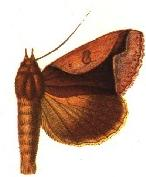
- Euminucia orthogona

Scientific classification
- Kingdom: Animalia
- Phylum: Arthropoda
- Class: Insecta
- Order: Lepidoptera
- Superfamily: Noctuoidea
- Family: Noctuidae (?)
- Subfamily: Catocalinae
- Genus: Euminucia; Hampson, 1913

= Euminucia =

Genus of moths

Euminucia is a genus of moths of the family Noctuidae.

== Species ==
- Euminucia camerunica Strand, 1913
- Euminucia conflua Hampson, 1913
- Euminucia ligulifera Strand, 1913
- Euminucia orthogona Hampson, 1913
