= Paralpenus wintgensi =

Scientific classification
- Domain: Eukaryota
- Kingdom: Animalia
- Phylum: Arthropoda
- Class: Insecta
- Order: Lepidoptera
- Superfamily: Noctuoidea
- Family: Erebidae
- Subfamily: Arctiinae
- Genus: Paralpenus
- Species: P. wintgensi

Binomial name
- Paralpenus wintgensi (Strand, 1909)

Synonyms
- Acantharctia wintgensi Strand, 1909; Maenas nigrilinea Joicey & Talbot, 1921; Maenas paucipuncta Joicey & Talbot, 1921; Hyphantria eborina Debauche, 1942

Species of moth

Paralpenus wintgensi is a moth of the family Erebidae. It was described by Strand in 1909. It is found in Burundi, the Democratic Republic of Congo, Eritrea, Rwanda, Tanzania and Zimbabwe.

== Subspecies ==
- Paralpenus wintgensi wintgensi
- Paralpenus wintgensi zimbabweiensis Dubatolov, 2011 (Zimbabwe)
