= Ortharbela rufula =

Scientific classification
- Kingdom: Animalia
- Phylum: Arthropoda
- Class: Insecta
- Order: Lepidoptera
- Family: Cossidae
- Genus: Ortharbela
- Species: O. rufula

Binomial name
- Ortharbela rufula (Hampson, 1910)

Synonyms
- Arbelodes rufula Hampson, 1910

Species of moth

Ortharbela rufula is a moth in the family Cossidae. It is found in Kenya.
