= Accra tanzanica =

Scientific classification
- Kingdom: Animalia
- Phylum: Arthropoda
- Clade: Pancrustacea
- Class: Insecta
- Order: Lepidoptera
- Family: Tortricidae
- Genus: Accra
- Species: A. tanzanica

Binomial name
- Accra tanzanica Razowski, 1990

Species of moth

Accra tanzanica is a species of moth of the family Tortricidae. It is found in Tanzania.

The wingspan is about 12 mm.
