= Paralpenus ugandae =

Scientific classification
- Kingdom: Animalia
- Phylum: Arthropoda
- Class: Insecta
- Order: Lepidoptera
- Superfamily: Noctuoidea
- Family: Erebidae
- Subfamily: Arctiinae
- Genus: Paralpenus
- Species: P. ugandae

Binomial name
- Paralpenus ugandae (Hampson, 1916)

Synonyms
- Amsacta ugandae Hampson, 1916

Species of moth

Paralpenus ugandae is a moth of the family Erebidae. It was described by George Hampson in 1916. It is found in Eritrea, Kenya and Uganda.
