= Episannina chalybea =

Scientific classification
- Kingdom: Animalia
- Phylum: Arthropoda
- Class: Insecta
- Order: Lepidoptera
- Family: Sesiidae
- Genus: Episannina
- Species: E. chalybea

Binomial name
- Episannina chalybea Aurivillius, 1905

Synonyms
- Sylphidia pulchra Le Cerf, 1916

Species of moth

Episannina chalybea is a moth of the family Sesiidae. It is known from Cameroon.
