= Prionotalis africanellus =

Scientific classification
- Kingdom: Animalia
- Phylum: Arthropoda
- Clade: Pancrustacea
- Class: Insecta
- Order: Lepidoptera
- Family: Crambidae
- Subfamily: Crambinae
- Tribe: Ancylolomiini
- Genus: Prionotalis
- Species: P. africanellus

Binomial name
- Prionotalis africanellus (Strand, 1909)

Synonyms
- Talis africanellus Strand, 1909

Species of moth

Prionotalis africanellus is a moth in the family Crambidae. It was described by Strand in 1909. It is found in Tanzania.
