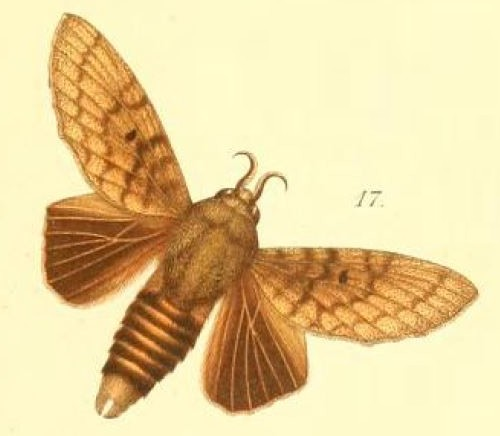
- Gastroplakaeis forficulatus

Scientific classification
- Kingdom: Animalia
- Phylum: Arthropoda
- Clade: Pancrustacea
- Class: Insecta
- Order: Lepidoptera
- Family: Lasiocampidae
- Genus: Gastroplakaeis
- Species: G. forficulatus

Binomial name
- Gastroplakaeis forficulatus Möschler, 1887

= Gastroplakaeis forficulatus =

Species of moth

Gastroplakaeis forficulatus is a moth species in the family of Lasiocampidae found in Ghana and Gabon.

== Related pages ==
- List of moths of Ghana
- List of moths of Gabon
