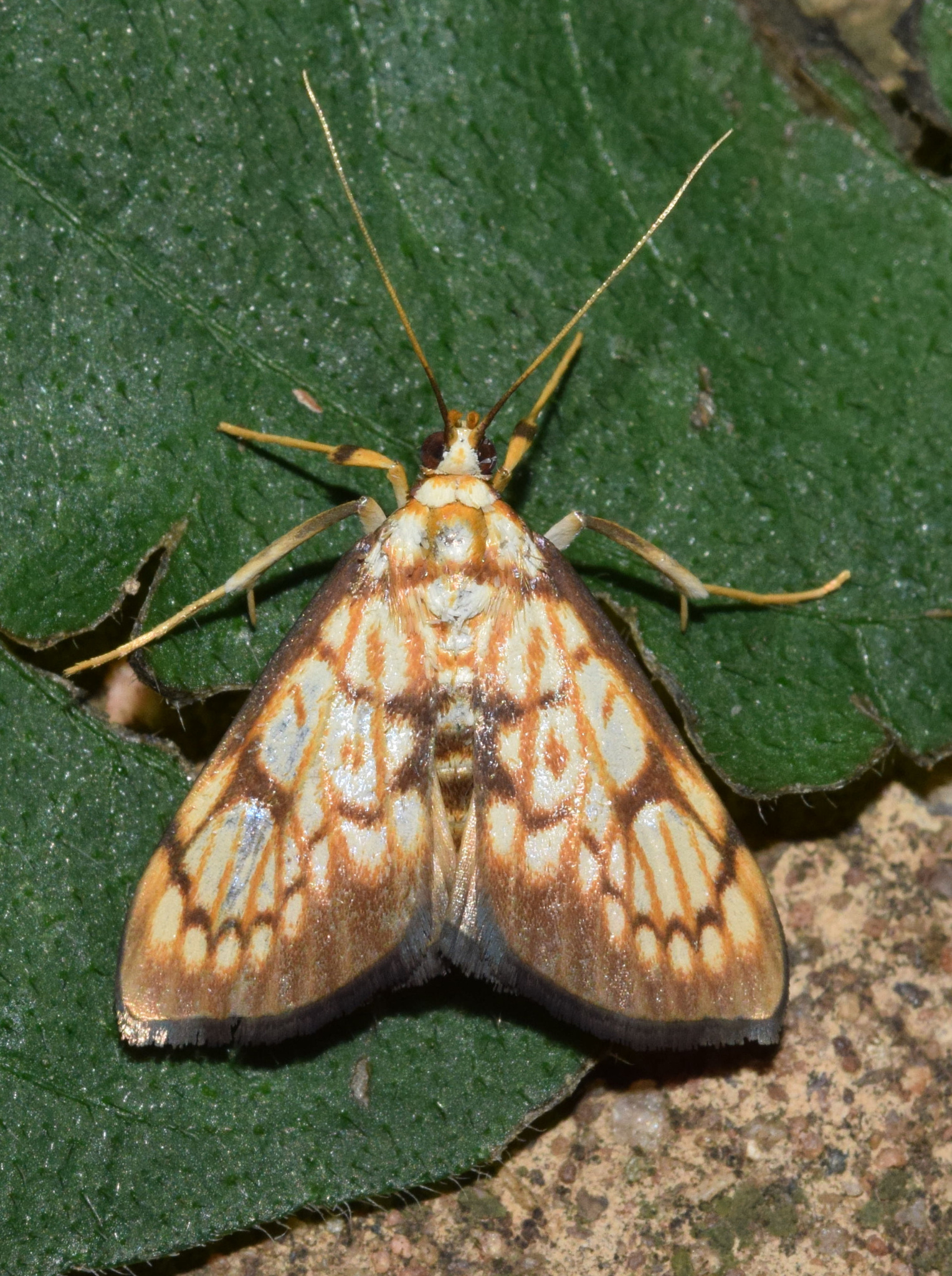
- Chalcidoptera thermographa

Scientific classification
- Kingdom: Animalia
- Phylum: Arthropoda
- Class: Insecta
- Order: Lepidoptera
- Family: Crambidae
- Tribe: Agroterini
- Genus: Chalcidoptera; Butler, 1887

Synonyms
- Chaleidoptera Carus, 1888; Euthalantha Snellen, 1895

= Chalcidoptera =

Genus of moths

Chalcidoptera is a genus of moths of the family Crambidae.

== Species ==
- Chalcidoptera alimenalis (Walker, 1859)
- Chalcidoptera appensalis (Snellen, 1884)
- Chalcidoptera argyrophoralis Hampson, 1912
- Chalcidoptera atrilobalis Hampson, 1896
- Chalcidoptera bilunalis Hampson, 1898
- Chalcidoptera contraria Gaede, 1917
- Chalcidoptera emissalis Walker, [1866]
- Chalcidoptera nigricans Gaede, 1917
- Chalcidoptera orbidiscalis Hampson, 1918
- Chalcidoptera pryeri Hampson, 1899
- Chalcidoptera rufilinealis Swinhoe, 1895
- Chalcidoptera thermographa Hampson, 1912
- Chalcidoptera thermographalis Strand, 1920
- Chalcidoptera trogobasalis Hampson, 1912

== Former species ==
- Chalcidoptera aethiops Gaede, 1917
