= Ortharbela bisinuata =

Scientific classification
- Kingdom: Animalia
- Phylum: Arthropoda
- Class: Insecta
- Order: Lepidoptera
- Family: Cossidae
- Genus: Ortharbela
- Species: O. bisinuata

Binomial name
- Ortharbela bisinuata (Hampson, 1920)

Synonyms
- Arbelodes bisinuata Hampson, 1920

Species of moth

Ortharbela bisinuata is a moth in the family Cossidae. It is found in Malawi.
