= Accra plumbeana =

Scientific classification
- Kingdom: Animalia
- Phylum: Arthropoda
- Class: Insecta
- Order: Lepidoptera
- Family: Tortricidae
- Genus: Accra
- Species: A. plumbeana

Binomial name
- Accra plumbeana Razowski, 1966

Species of moth

Accra plumbeana is a species of moth of the family Tortricidae. It is found in Kenya and Tanzania.
