= Accra canthararcha =

Scientific classification
- Kingdom: Animalia
- Phylum: Arthropoda
- Class: Insecta
- Order: Lepidoptera
- Family: Tortricidae
- Genus: Accra
- Species: A. canthararcha

Binomial name
- Accra canthararcha (Meyrick, 1937)

Synonyms
- Argyrotoxa canthararcha Meyrick, 1937; Polemograptis cantararcha; Russograptis canthararcha

Species of moth

Accra canthararcha is a species of moth of the family Tortricidae. It is found in the Democratic Republic of Congo.
