= Episannina =

Scientific classification
- Kingdom: Animalia
- Phylum: Arthropoda
- Class: Insecta
- Order: Lepidoptera
- Family: Sesiidae
- Subfamily: Sesiinae
- Genus: Episannina; Aurivillius, 1905

Species
- See text

Genus of moths

Episannina is a genus of moths in the family Sesiidae.

== Species ==
- Episannina albifrons (Hampson, 1910)
- Episannina chalybea Aurivillius, 1905
- Episannina flavicincta Hampson, 1919
- Episannina lodimana (Strand, 1918)
- Episannina modesta (Le Cerf, 1916)
- Episannina perlucida (Le Cerf, 1911)
- Episannina zygaenura Meyrick, 1933
