= Accra kikuayana =

Scientific classification
- Kingdom: Animalia
- Phylum: Arthropoda
- Class: Insecta
- Order: Lepidoptera
- Family: Tortricidae
- Genus: Accra
- Species: A. kikuayana

Binomial name
- Accra kikuayana Razowski, 2005

Synonyms
- Accra kikuyana Razowski, 2005

Species of moth

Accra kikuayana is a species of moth of the family Tortricidae. It is found in Kenya and Nigeria.

The wingspan is about 14 mm.
