= Ortharbela sommerlattei =

Scientific classification
- Kingdom: Animalia
- Phylum: Arthropoda
- Class: Insecta
- Order: Lepidoptera
- Family: Cossidae
- Genus: Ortharbela
- Species: O. sommerlattei

Binomial name
- Ortharbela sommerlattei Lehmann, 2008

Species of moth

Ortharbela sommerlattei is a moth in the family Cossidae. It is found in Tanzania, where it has been recorded from the East Usambara Mountains. The habitat consists of submontane forests.

The length of the forewings is about 7.9 mm.

== Etymology ==
The species is named for Dr Malte Walter Ludwig Sommerlatte.
