= Accra amanica =

Scientific classification
- Kingdom: Animalia
- Phylum: Arthropoda
- Class: Insecta
- Order: Lepidoptera
- Family: Tortricidae
- Genus: Accra
- Species: A. amanica

Binomial name
- Accra amanica Razowski, 2005

Species of moth

Accra amanica is a species of moth of the family Tortricidae. It is found in Tanzania.

The wingspan is about 15 mm.
