= Ortharbela semifasciata =

Scientific classification
- Kingdom: Animalia
- Phylum: Arthropoda
- Class: Insecta
- Order: Lepidoptera
- Family: Cossidae
- Genus: Ortharbela
- Species: O. semifasciata

Binomial name
- Ortharbela semifasciata Gaede, 1929

Species of moth

Ortharbela semifasciata is a moth in the family Cossidae. It is found in Cameroon.
