= Episannina perlucida =

Scientific classification
- Kingdom: Animalia
- Phylum: Arthropoda
- Class: Insecta
- Order: Lepidoptera
- Family: Sesiidae
- Genus: Episannina
- Species: E. perlucida

Binomial name
- Episannina perlucida (Le Cerf, 1911)

Synonyms
- Sylphidia perlucida Le Cerf, 1911

Species of moth

Episannina perlucida is a moth of the family Sesiidae. It is known from the Democratic Republic of the Congo and Gabon.
