= Paralpenus julius =

Scientific classification
- Kingdom: Animalia
- Phylum: Arthropoda
- Class: Insecta
- Order: Lepidoptera
- Superfamily: Noctuoidea
- Family: Erebidae
- Subfamily: Arctiinae
- Genus: Paralpenus
- Species: P. julius

Binomial name
- Paralpenus julius Kühne, 2010

Species of moth

Paralpenus julius is a moth of the family Erebidae. It was described by Lars Kühne in 2010. It is found in Zimbabwe.
