= Paremonia luteicincta =

Scientific classification
- Domain: Eukaryota
- Kingdom: Animalia
- Phylum: Arthropoda
- Class: Insecta
- Order: Lepidoptera
- Superfamily: Noctuoidea
- Family: Erebidae
- Subfamily: Arctiinae
- Genus: Paremonia
- Species: P. luteicincta

Binomial name
- Paremonia luteicincta (Holland, 1893)

Synonyms
- Hemonia luteicincta Holland, 1893

Species of moth

Paremonia luteicincta is a moth of the subfamily Arctiinae. It was described by William Jacob Holland in 1893. It is found in Gabon.
