= Ortharbela cliftoni =

Scientific classification
- Kingdom: Animalia
- Phylum: Arthropoda
- Class: Insecta
- Order: Lepidoptera
- Family: Cossidae
- Genus: Ortharbela
- Species: O. cliftoni

Binomial name
- Ortharbela cliftoni Lehmann, 2009

Species of moth

Ortharbela cliftoni is a moth in the family Cossidae. It is found in Tanzania, where it has been recorded from the East Usambara Mountains. The habitat consists of submontane forests.

The length of the forewings is about 8.5 mm.

== Etymology ==
The species is named for Mike Peter Clifton.
