= Paralpenus strigulosa =

Scientific classification
- Kingdom: Animalia
- Phylum: Arthropoda
- Class: Insecta
- Order: Lepidoptera
- Superfamily: Noctuoidea
- Family: Erebidae
- Subfamily: Arctiinae
- Genus: Paralpenus
- Species: P. strigulosa

Binomial name
- Paralpenus strigulosa (Hampson, 1901)

Synonyms
- Hyphantria strigulosa Hampson, 1901; Estigmene atropunctata Fawcett, 1903

Species of moth

Paralpenus strigulosa is a moth of the family Erebidae. It was described by George Hampson in 1901. It is found in South Africa.

The larvae feed on Cyanotis nodifera and Vernonia gerradi.
