= Melisa =

Scientific classification
- Kingdom: Animalia
- Phylum: Arthropoda
- Class: Insecta
- Order: Lepidoptera
- Superfamily: Noctuoidea
- Family: Erebidae
- Subfamily: Arctiinae
- Tribe: Syntomini
- Genus: Melisa; Walker, 1854

Genus of moths

Melisa is a genus of moths in the family Erebidae. The genus was erected by Francis Walker in 1854.

== Species ==
- Melisa croceipes (Aurivillius, 1892)
- Melisa diptera Walker, 1854
- Melisa hancocki Jordan, 1936
