= Chalcidoptera thermographalis =

Scientific classification
- Kingdom: Animalia
- Phylum: Arthropoda
- Clade: Pancrustacea
- Class: Insecta
- Order: Lepidoptera
- Family: Crambidae
- Genus: Chalcidoptera
- Species: C. thermographalis

Binomial name
- Chalcidoptera thermographalis Strand, 1920

Species of moth

Chalcidoptera thermographalis is a moth in the family Crambidae. It was described by Strand in 1920. It is found in Cameroon.
