= Paralpenus flavicosta =

Scientific classification
- Kingdom: Animalia
- Phylum: Arthropoda
- Class: Insecta
- Order: Lepidoptera
- Superfamily: Noctuoidea
- Family: Erebidae
- Subfamily: Arctiinae
- Genus: Paralpenus
- Species: P. flavicosta

Binomial name
- Paralpenus flavicosta (Hampson, 1909)

Synonyms
- Amsacta flavicosta Hampson, 1909; Stracena punctigera Hering, 1928

Species of moth

Paralpenus flavicosta is a moth of the family Erebidae. It was described by George Hampson in 1909. It is found in Cameroon, Kenya, Sierra Leone, Zambia and Zimbabwe.

== Subspecies ==
- Paralpenus flavicosta flavicosta
- Paralpenus flavicosta punctigera (Hering, 1928) (Cameroon)
