= Logunovium =

Scientific classification
- Kingdom: Animalia
- Phylum: Arthropoda
- Clade: Pancrustacea
- Class: Insecta
- Order: Lepidoptera
- Superfamily: Noctuoidea
- Family: Erebidae
- Subfamily: Arctiinae
- Tribe: Arctiini
- Subtribe: Spilosomina
- Genus: Logunovium; Dubatolov, 2006

Type species
- Logunovium scortillum Wallengren, 1875

Species
- Logunovium nigricostum; Logunovium scortillum

Genus of moths

Logunovium is a genus of moths in the family Erebidae from Afrotropics.

== Species ==
- Logunovium nigricostum (Holland, 1893)
- Logunovium scortillum (Wallengren, 1875)
