= Chalcidoptera pryeri =

Scientific classification
- Kingdom: Animalia
- Phylum: Arthropoda
- Clade: Pancrustacea
- Class: Insecta
- Order: Lepidoptera
- Family: Crambidae
- Genus: Chalcidoptera
- Species: C. pryeri

Binomial name
- Chalcidoptera pryeri Hampson, 1898

Species of moth

Chalcidoptera pryeri is a moth in the family Crambidae. It was described by George Hampson in 1898. It is found on Borneo.

The wingspan is about 20 mm. The forewings are deep red with a fuscous costa and a small yellow spot in the end of the cell, as well as a large lunulate (crescent-shaped) spot beyond the cell. The costal and inner areas and the termen on the hindwings are fuscous.
