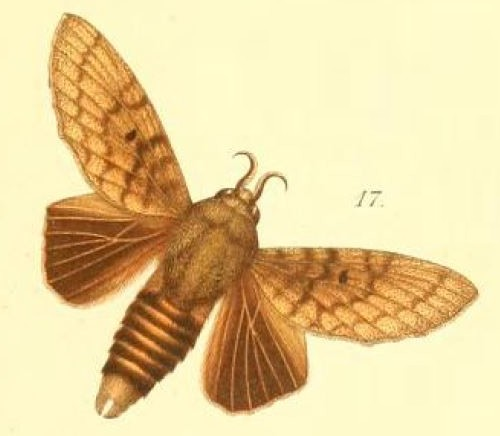
- Gastroplakaeis forficulatus

Scientific classification
- Domain: Eukaryota
- Kingdom: Animalia
- Phylum: Arthropoda
- Class: Insecta
- Order: Lepidoptera
- Family: Lasiocampidae
- Subfamily: Lasiocampinae
- Tribe: Pinarini
- Genus: Gastroplakaeis; Möschler, 1887

Type species
- Gastroplakaeis forficulatus Möschler, 1887

= Gastroplakaeis =

Genus of moths

Gastroplakaeis is a genus of moths in the family Lasiocampidae first described by Heinrich Benno Möschler in 1887.

== Species ==
- Gastroplakaeis annuligera Strand, 1913
- Gastroplakaeis delicatulus Aurivillius, 1911
- Gastroplakaeis elongata Hering, 1941
- Gastroplakaeis forficulatus Möschler, 1887
- Gastroplakaeis greyi Holland, 1893
- Gastroplakaeis idakum Bethune-Baker, 1913
- Gastroplakaeis meridionalis Aurivillius, 1901
- Gastroplakaeis punctifera (Riel, 1911)
- Gastroplakaeis rubroanalis Wichgraf, 1913
- Gastroplakaeis rufescens Aurivillius, 1905
- Gastroplakaeis schultzei Aurivillius, 1905
- Gastroplakaeis toroensis Bethune-Baker, 1927
- Gastroplakaeis variegata Hering, 1932
