= Asuroides sagenaria =

Crossed footman

Scientific classification
- Kingdom: Animalia
- Phylum: Arthropoda
- Class: Insecta
- Order: Lepidoptera
- Superfamily: Noctuoidea
- Family: Erebidae
- Subfamily: Arctiinae
- Genus: Asuroides
- Species: A. sagenaria

Binomial name
- Asuroides sagenaria (Wallengren, 1860)

Synonyms
- Setina sagenaria Wallengren, 1860; Asura sagenaria; Miltochrista natalensis Walker, 1865; Asura faginaria (Wallengren, 1863)

Species of moth

Asuroides sagenaria, the crossed footman, is a moth of the family Erebidae. It was described by Wallengren in 1860. It is found in the Democratic Republic of Congo, Mozambique, South Africa, Tanzania, Uganda, Zambia and Zimbabwe.

The larvae feed on lichens and Cinnamomum zeylanicum.
