= Episannina lodimana =

Scientific classification
- Kingdom: Animalia
- Phylum: Arthropoda
- Class: Insecta
- Order: Lepidoptera
- Family: Sesiidae
- Genus: Episannina
- Species: E. lodimana

Binomial name
- Episannina lodimana (Strand, 1918)

Synonyms
- Sciapteron lodimana Strand, 1918; Paranthrene lodimana

Species of moth

Episannina lodimana is a moth of the family Sesiidae. It is known from the Democratic Republic of the Congo.
