= Gastroplakaeis toroensis =

Scientific classification
- Domain: Eukaryota
- Kingdom: Animalia
- Phylum: Arthropoda
- Class: Insecta
- Order: Lepidoptera
- Family: Lasiocampidae
- Genus: Gastroplakaeis
- Species: G. toroensis

Binomial name
- Gastroplakaeis toroensis Bethune-Baker, 1927

Species of moth

Gastroplakaeis toroensis is a moth in the family Lasiocampidae. It was described by George Thomas Bethune-Baker in 1927. It is found in Uganda.

The wingspan is about 110 mm. The forewings are cinnamon brown, with traces of a basal grey line, as well as a twin median grey line, which is very irregularly and highly angled. There is also a postmedian twin crenulate grey line, which develops a third section from vein two. This line, like the median line, is very irregular and angled beyond this is an indefinite broad stripe of grey scales following the contour of the postmedian lines. There is also a distinct blackish spot at the end of the cell. The hindwings are duller brown, with a trace of a cloudy band of shading in the postmedian area.
