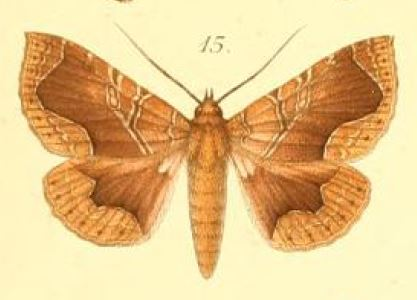
- Calligraphidia opulenta

Scientific classification
- Domain: Eukaryota
- Kingdom: Animalia
- Phylum: Arthropoda
- Class: Insecta
- Order: Lepidoptera
- Superfamily: Noctuoidea
- Family: Erebidae
- Subfamily: Calpinae
- Genus: Calligraphidia; Gaede, 1939

= Calligraphidia =

Genus of moths

Calligraphidia is a genus of moths of the family Noctuidae.

== Species ==
- Calligraphidia opulenta (Moschler, 1887)
- Calligraphidia tessellata (Kenrick, 1917)
