= Paralpenus =

Scientific classification
- Domain: Eukaryota
- Kingdom: Animalia
- Phylum: Arthropoda
- Class: Insecta
- Order: Lepidoptera
- Superfamily: Noctuoidea
- Family: Erebidae
- Subfamily: Arctiinae
- Subtribe: Spilosomina
- Genus: Paralpenus; Watson, 1988

Type species
- Hyphoraia atripes Hampson, 1909

Genus of moths

Paralpenus is a genus of moths in the subfamily Arctiinae from the Afrotropics. The genus was described by Watson in 1988.

== Species ==
- Paralpenus atripes (Hampson, 1909)
- Paralpenus flavicosta (Hampson, 1909)
  - Paralpenus flavicosta punctiger (Hering, 1928)
- Paralpenus flavizonatus (Hampson, 1911)
- Paralpenus julius Kühne, 2010
- Paralpenus strigulosa (Hampson, 1901)
- Paralpenus ugandae (Hampson, 1916)
- Paralpenus wintgensi (Strand, 1909)
  - Paralpenus wintgensi zimbabweiensis Dubatolov, 2011
