= Gastroplakaeis schultzei =

Scientific classification
- Domain: Eukaryota
- Kingdom: Animalia
- Phylum: Arthropoda
- Class: Insecta
- Order: Lepidoptera
- Family: Lasiocampidae
- Genus: Gastroplakaeis
- Species: G. schultzei

Binomial name
- Gastroplakaeis schultzei Aurivillius, 1905

Species of moth

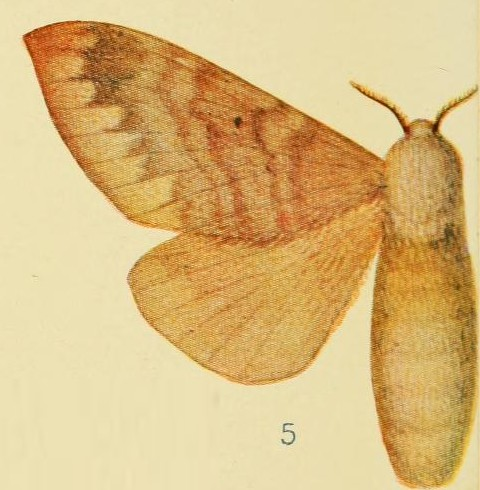
Gastroplakaeis schultzei

Gastroplakaeis schultzei is a moth species in the family of Lasiocampidae found in Nigeria.

== Related pages ==
- List of moths of Nigeria
