= Melisa hancocki =

Scientific classification
- Domain: Eukaryota
- Kingdom: Animalia
- Phylum: Arthropoda
- Class: Insecta
- Order: Lepidoptera
- Superfamily: Noctuoidea
- Family: Erebidae
- Subfamily: Arctiinae
- Genus: Melisa
- Species: M. hancocki

Binomial name
- Melisa hancocki Jordan, 1936

Species of moth

Melisa hancocki is a moth of the family Erebidae. It was described by Karl Jordan in 1936. It is found in Uganda.
