= Asuroides calimerae =

Scientific classification
- Domain: Eukaryota
- Kingdom: Animalia
- Phylum: Arthropoda
- Class: Insecta
- Order: Lepidoptera
- Superfamily: Noctuoidea
- Family: Erebidae
- Subfamily: Arctiinae
- Genus: Asuroides
- Species: A. calimerae

Binomial name
- Asuroides calimerae Durante, 2008

Species of moth

Asuroides calimerae is a moth of the family Erebidae. It was described by Antonio Durante in 2008. It is found in Africa.
