= Accra venatrix =

Scientific classification
- Kingdom: Animalia
- Phylum: Arthropoda
- Class: Insecta
- Order: Lepidoptera
- Family: Tortricidae
- Genus: Accra
- Species: A. venatrix

Binomial name
- Accra venatrix (Meyrick, 1930)

Synonyms
- Argyrotoxa venatrix Meyrick, 1930

Species of moth

Accra venatrix is a species of moth of the family Tortricidae. It is found in Cameroon.
