= Ortharbela guttata =

Scientific classification
- Kingdom: Animalia
- Phylum: Arthropoda
- Class: Insecta
- Order: Lepidoptera
- Family: Cossidae
- Genus: Ortharbela
- Species: O. guttata

Binomial name
- Ortharbela guttata Aurivillius, 1910

Species of moth

Ortharbela guttata is a moth in the family Cossidae. It is found in Tanzania.
