= Gastroplakaeis rubroanalis =

Scientific classification
- Domain: Eukaryota
- Kingdom: Animalia
- Phylum: Arthropoda
- Class: Insecta
- Order: Lepidoptera
- Family: Lasiocampidae
- Genus: Gastroplakaeis
- Species: G. rubroanalis

Binomial name
- Gastroplakaeis rubroanalis Wichgraf, 1913

Species of moth

Gastroplakaeis rubroanalis is a moth species in the family of Lasiocampidae found in Cameroon and Gabon.

This species has a wingspan of 64mm and a body length of 38mm.

== Related pages ==
- List of moths of Cameroon
- List of moths of Gabon
