= Accra witteae =

Scientific classification
- Kingdom: Animalia
- Phylum: Arthropoda
- Class: Insecta
- Order: Lepidoptera
- Family: Tortricidae
- Genus: Accra
- Species: A. witteae

Binomial name
- Accra witteae Razowski, 1964

Synonyms
- Accra wittei Razowski, 1966

Species of moth

Accra witteae is a species of moth of the family Tortricidae. It is found in the Democratic Republic of Congo.
