= Prionotalis friesei =

Scientific classification
- Kingdom: Animalia
- Phylum: Arthropoda
- Clade: Pancrustacea
- Class: Insecta
- Order: Lepidoptera
- Family: Crambidae
- Subfamily: Crambinae
- Tribe: Ancylolomiini
- Genus: Prionotalis
- Species: P. friesei

Binomial name
- Prionotalis friesei Błeszyński, 1963

Species of moth

Prionotalis friesei is a moth in the family Crambidae. It was described by Stanisław Błeszyński in 1963. It is found in Ethiopia.
