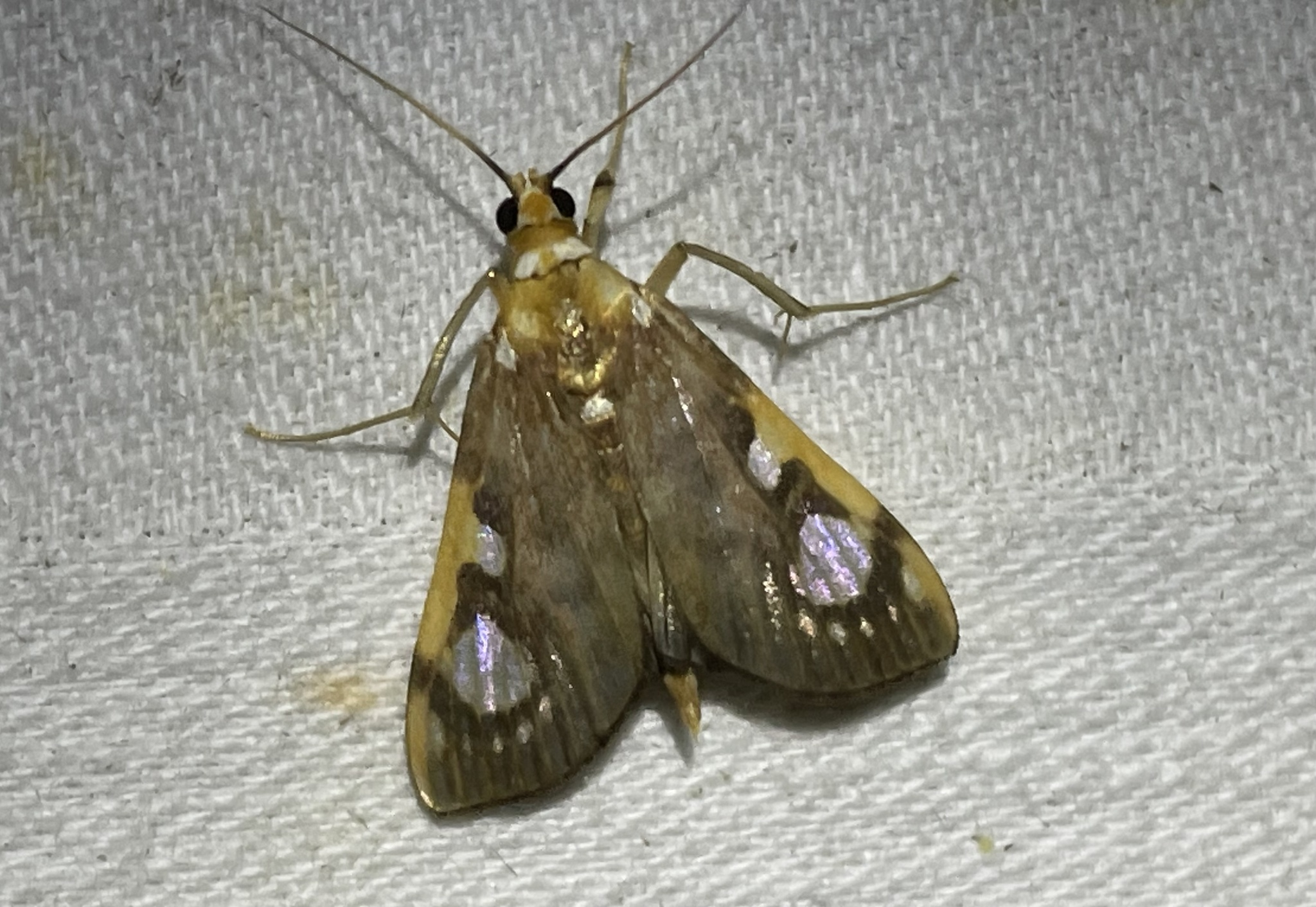

Scientific classification
- Kingdom: Animalia
- Phylum: Arthropoda
- Class: Insecta
- Order: Lepidoptera
- Family: Crambidae
- Genus: Chalcidoptera
- Species: C. contraria

Binomial name
- Chalcidoptera contraria Gaede, 1917

Synonyms
- Chalcidoptera contraria v. curtipalpis Strand, 1920

= Chalcidoptera contraria =

Species of moth

Chalcidoptera contraria is a species of moth in the family Crambidae. It was originally described by Max Gaede in 1917. It is found in Cameroon, the Democratic Republic of the Congo (Equateur, East Kasai) and Togo.
