= Xeneboda mayumbea =

Scientific classification
- Kingdom: Animalia
- Phylum: Arthropoda
- Class: Insecta
- Order: Lepidoptera
- Family: Tortricidae
- Genus: Xeneboda
- Species: X. mayumbea

Binomial name
- Xeneboda mayumbea Razowski, 2012

Species of moth

Xeneboda mayumbea is a species of moth of the family Tortricidae. It is endemic to the Democratic Republic of the Congo.

The wingspan is about 8.5 millimetres (0.33 in).

== Etymology ==
The species is named after, Mayombe.
