= Ortharbela jurateae =

Scientific classification
- Kingdom: Animalia
- Phylum: Arthropoda
- Class: Insecta
- Order: Lepidoptera
- Family: Cossidae
- Genus: Ortharbela
- Species: O. jurateae

Binomial name
- Ortharbela jurateae Lehmann, 2009

Species of moth

Ortharbela jurateae is a moth in the family Cossidae. It is found in Tanzania, where it has been recorded from the Uluguru Mountains. The habitat consists of lowland and submontane miombo woodlands.

The length of the forewings is about 8.5 mm.

== Etymology ==
The species is named for Dr Jurate De Prins.
