= Chalcidoptera nigricans =

Scientific classification
- Kingdom: Animalia
- Phylum: Arthropoda
- Clade: Pancrustacea
- Class: Insecta
- Order: Lepidoptera
- Family: Crambidae
- Genus: Chalcidoptera
- Species: C. nigricans

Binomial name
- Chalcidoptera nigricans Gaede, 1917

Species of moth

Chalcidoptera nigricans is a moth in the family Crambidae that was first described by Max Gaede in 1917. The moth's origins can be traced from Cameroon and Guinea Equatorial.

The wingspan of this species is about 18–20 mm.
