= Calligraphidia tessellata =

Scientific classification
- Domain: Eukaryota
- Kingdom: Animalia
- Phylum: Arthropoda
- Class: Insecta
- Order: Lepidoptera
- Superfamily: Noctuoidea
- Family: Erebidae
- Genus: Calligraphidia
- Species: C. tessellata

Binomial name
- Calligraphidia tessellata (Kenrick, 1917)

Synonyms
- Polydesma tessellata Kenrick, 1917

Species of moth

Calligraphidia tessellata is a moth in the family Noctuidae. It was first described by George Hamilton Kenrick in 1917 and is known from Madagascar.

The forewings of this species are brown with a violet shade, the costa with a series of dark brown spots; an ochreous-basal patch, irrorated (sprinkled) with black, followed by an irregular double violet line, an indistinct dark median line and a strongly marked dark postmedian line. The wingspan of this species is 50 mm.
