= Asuroides =

Scientific classification
- Kingdom: Animalia
- Phylum: Arthropoda
- Clade: Pancrustacea
- Class: Insecta
- Order: Lepidoptera
- Superfamily: Noctuoidea
- Family: Erebidae
- Subfamily: Arctiinae
- Subtribe: Nudariina
- Genus: Asuroides; Durante, 2008

Genus of moths

Asuroides is a genus of moths in the family Erebidae. The genus was erected by Antonio Durante in 2008.

== Species ==
- Asuroides atricraspeda
- Asuroides calimerae
- Asuroides dimidiata
- Asuroides fasciata
- Asuroides retromaculata
- Asuroides rosea
- Asuroides rubea
- Asuroides sagenaria
- Asuroides similis
