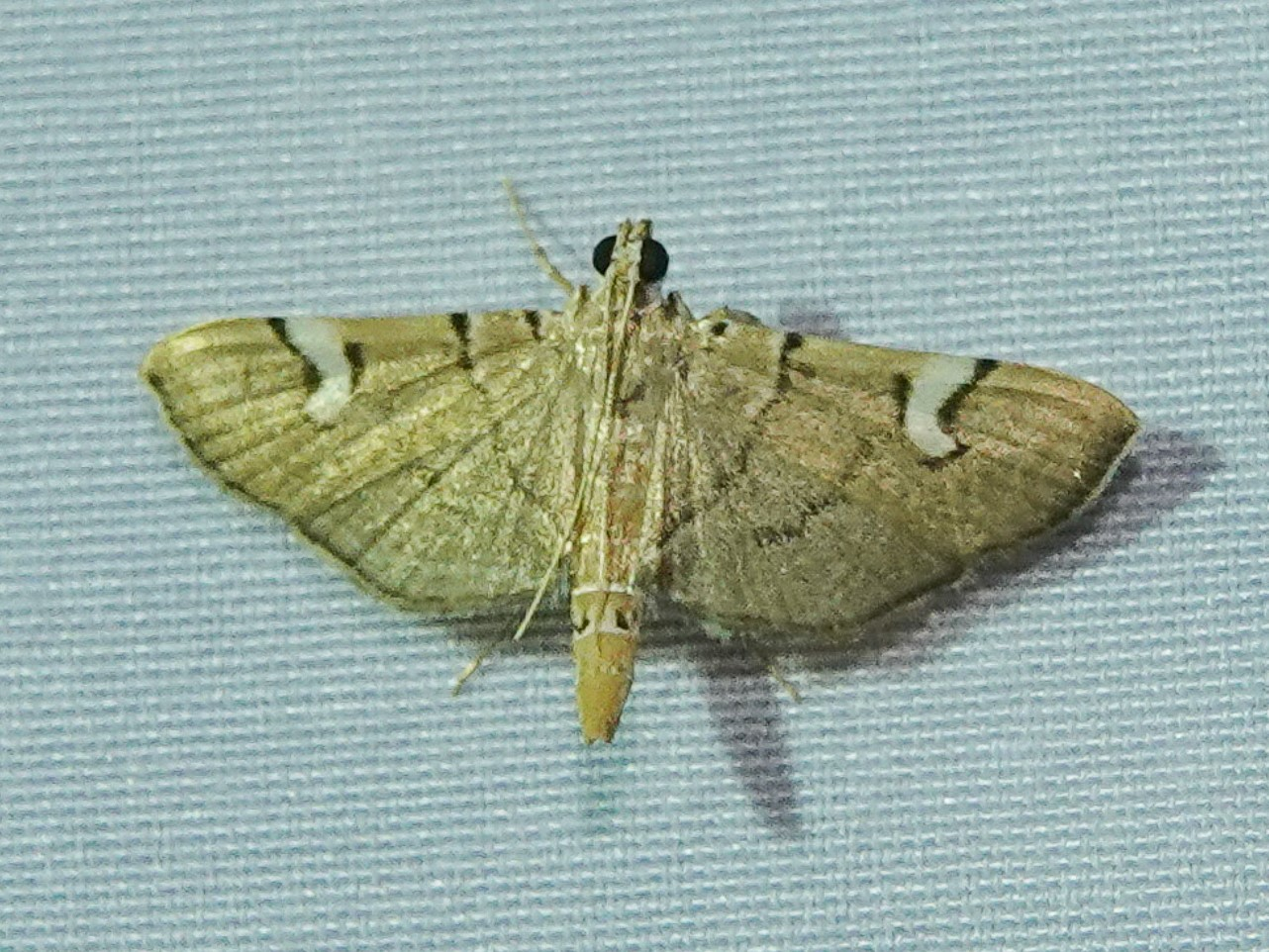

Scientific classification
- Kingdom: Animalia
- Phylum: Arthropoda
- Clade: Pancrustacea
- Class: Insecta
- Order: Lepidoptera
- Family: Crambidae
- Genus: Chalcidoptera
- Species: C. appensalis

Binomial name
- Chalcidoptera appensalis (Snellen, 1884)

Synonyms
- Entephria appensalis Snellen, 1884; Chalcidoptera appensalis var. aethiops Gaede, 1917

= Chalcidoptera appensalis =

Species of moth

Chalcidoptera appensalis is a species of moth in the family Crambidae. It was described by Pieter Snellen in 1884. It is found in the Democratic Republic of Congo (Orientale), Togo, Zambia, India, Indonesia (Java, Sulawesi), Myanmar and Sri Lanka.
