= Barbasphecia =

Scientific classification
- Domain: Eukaryota
- Kingdom: Animalia
- Phylum: Arthropoda
- Class: Insecta
- Order: Lepidoptera
- Family: Sesiidae
- Tribe: Sesiini
- Genus: Barbasphecia; Pühringer & Sáfián, 2011

Species
- See text

Genus of moths

Barbasphecia is a genus of moths in the family Sesiidae.

== Species ==
- Barbasphecia ares Pühringer & Sáfián, 2011
- Barbasphecia hephaistos Pühringer & Sáfián, 2011
