= Episannina modesta =

Scientific classification
- Kingdom: Animalia
- Phylum: Arthropoda
- Class: Insecta
- Order: Lepidoptera
- Family: Sesiidae
- Genus: Episannina
- Species: E. modesta

Binomial name
- Episannina modesta (Le Cerf, 1916)

Synonyms
- Sylphidia modesta Le Cerf, 1916

Species of moth

Episannina modesta is a moth of the family Sesiidae. It is known from Cameroon.
