= Accra erythrocyma =

Scientific classification
- Kingdom: Animalia
- Phylum: Arthropoda
- Class: Insecta
- Order: Lepidoptera
- Family: Tortricidae
- Genus: Accra
- Species: A. erythrocyma

Binomial name
- Accra erythrocyma (Meyrick, 1930)

Synonyms
- Argyrotoxa erythrocyma Meyrick, 1930

Species of moth

Accra erythrocyma is a species of moth of the family Tortricidae.

== Location ==
It is found in Cameroon.
