= Xeneboda congo =

Scientific classification
- Kingdom: Animalia
- Phylum: Arthropoda
- Class: Insecta
- Order: Lepidoptera
- Family: Tortricidae
- Genus: Xeneboda
- Species: X. congo

Binomial name
- Xeneboda congo Razowski, 2012

Species of moth

Xeneboda congo is a species of moth of the family Tortricidae. It is endemic to the Democratic Republic of the Congo.

The wingspan is about 16.5 millimetres (0.65 in).
