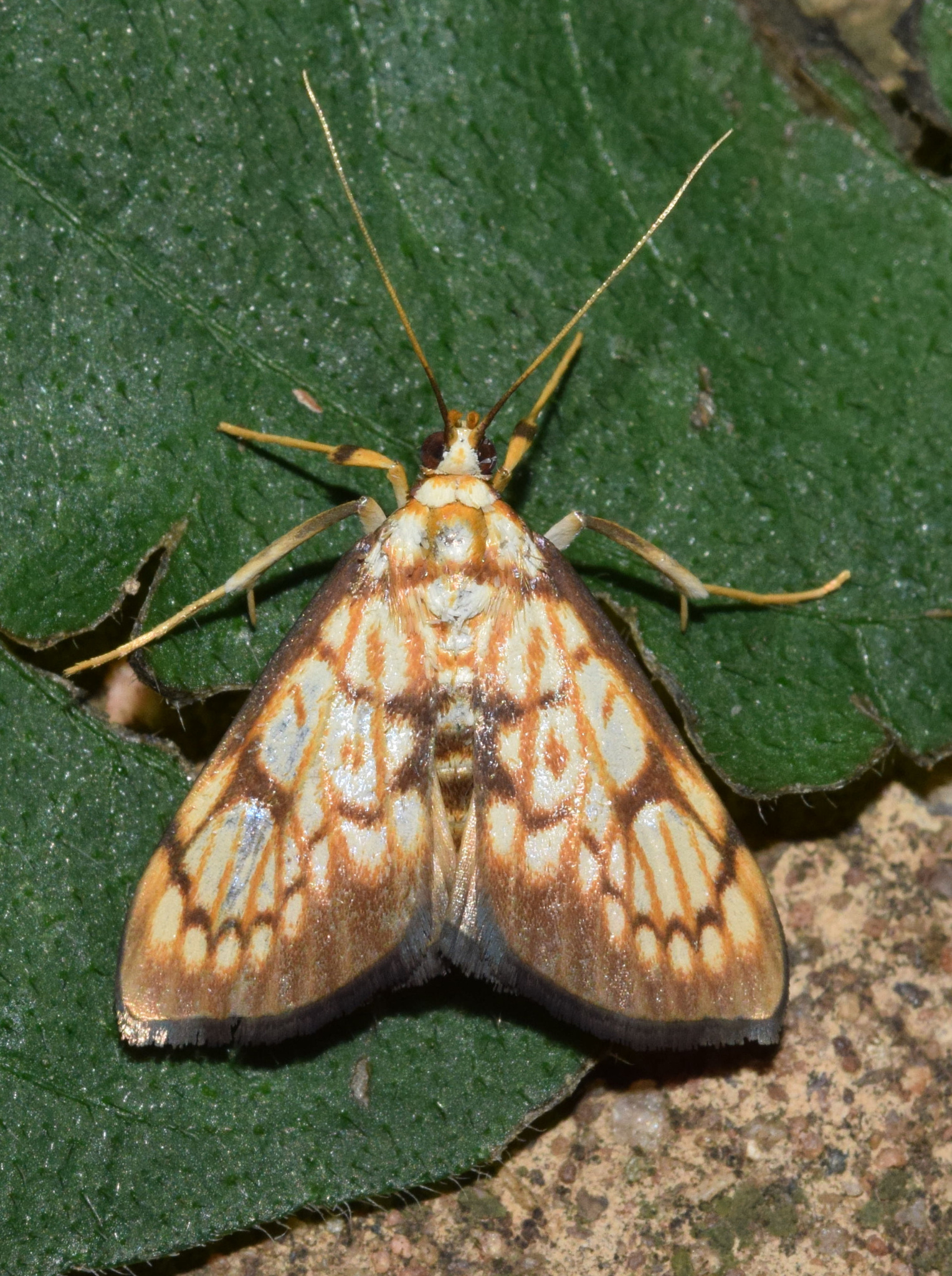

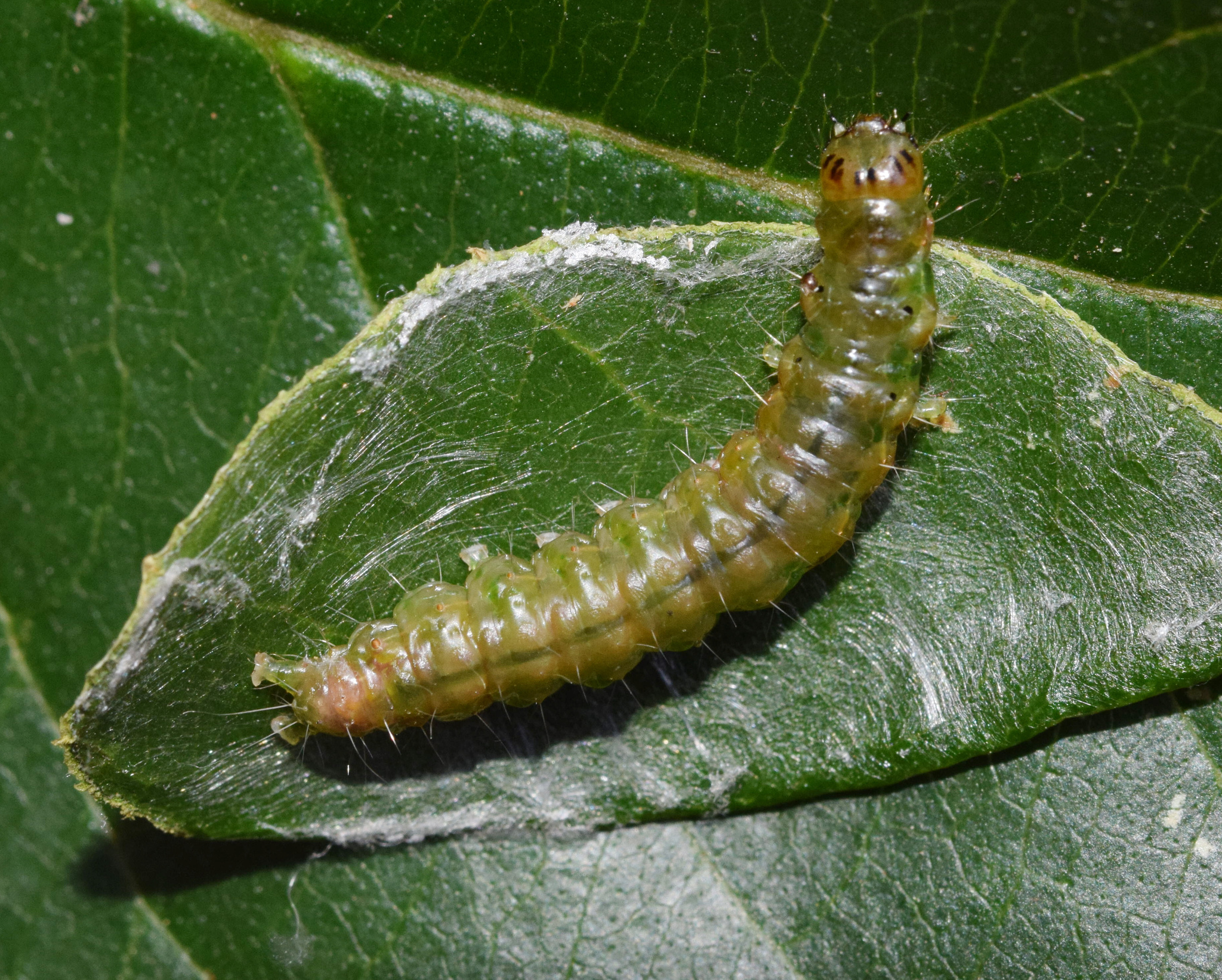
- Adult (top) and larva (bottom)

Scientific classification
- Kingdom: Animalia
- Phylum: Arthropoda
- Clade: Pancrustacea
- Class: Insecta
- Order: Lepidoptera
- Family: Crambidae
- Genus: Chalcidoptera
- Species: C. thermographa

Binomial name
- Chalcidoptera thermographa Hampson, 1912

Synonyms
- Chalcidoptera rufilinealis Hampson, 1910

= Chalcidoptera thermographa =

Species of moth

Chalcidoptera thermographa is a species of moth in the family Crambidae. It was described by George Hampson in 1912. It is found in the former Katanga Province of the Democratic Republic of the Congo, Ethiopia, South Africa and Zambia.
