= Accra rubrothicta =

Scientific classification
- Kingdom: Animalia
- Phylum: Arthropoda
- Class: Insecta
- Order: Lepidoptera
- Family: Tortricidae
- Genus: Accra
- Species: A. rubrothicta

Binomial name
- Accra rubrothicta Razowski, 1986

Species of moth

Accra rubrothicta is a species of moth of the family Tortricidae. It is found in Nigeria.

The wingspan is about 12 mm.
