= Melisa diptera =

Scientific classification
- Kingdom: Animalia
- Phylum: Arthropoda
- Clade: Pancrustacea
- Class: Insecta
- Order: Lepidoptera
- Superfamily: Noctuoidea
- Family: Erebidae
- Subfamily: Arctiinae
- Genus: Melisa
- Species: M. diptera

Binomial name
- Melisa diptera (Walker, 1854)

Synonyms
- Euchromia diptera Walker, 1854; Melisa grandis Holland, 1893

Species of moth

Melisa diptera is a moth of the family Erebidae. It was described by Francis Walker in 1854. It is found in Angola, Cameroon, the Democratic Republic of the Congo, Equatorial Guinea, Gabon, Ghana, Ivory Coast and Nigeria.
