= Scopula chrysoparalias =

Scientific classification
- Kingdom: Animalia
- Phylum: Arthropoda
- Clade: Pancrustacea
- Class: Insecta
- Order: Lepidoptera
- Family: Geometridae
- Genus: Scopula
- Species: S. chrysoparalias

Binomial name
- Scopula chrysoparalias (Prout, 1917)

Synonyms
- Anacosymbia chrysoparalias Prout, 1917; Epicosymbia chrysoparalias

Species of geometer moth in subfamily Sterrhinae

Scopula chrysoparalias is a moth of the family Geometridae. It was described by Prout in 1917. It is endemic to Ghana.
