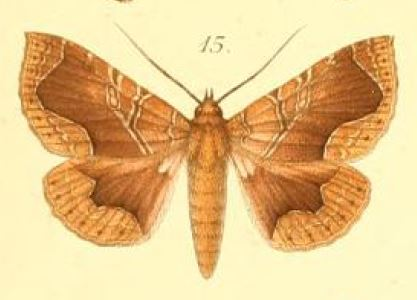

Scientific classification
- Domain: Eukaryota
- Kingdom: Animalia
- Phylum: Arthropoda
- Class: Insecta
- Order: Lepidoptera
- Superfamily: Noctuoidea
- Family: Erebidae
- Genus: Calligraphidia
- Species: C. opulenta

Binomial name
- Calligraphidia opulenta (Möschler, 1887)

Synonyms
- Ophisma opulenta Möschler, 1887

= Calligraphidia opulenta =

Species of moth

Calligraphidia opulenta is a moth in the family Erebidae first described by Heinrich Benno Möschler in 1887. It is known from Gabon and Ghana.
