= Ethmia livida =

Scientific classification
- Kingdom: Animalia
- Phylum: Arthropoda
- Clade: Pancrustacea
- Class: Insecta
- Order: Lepidoptera
- Family: Depressariidae
- Genus: Ethmia
- Species: E. livida

Binomial name
- Ethmia livida (Zeller, 1852)

Synonyms
- Psecadia livida Zeller, 1852

Species of moth

Ethmia livida is a moth in the family Depressariidae. It is found in Ghana and South Africa.
