= Logunovium nigricostum =

Scientific classification
- Domain: Eukaryota
- Kingdom: Animalia
- Phylum: Arthropoda
- Class: Insecta
- Order: Lepidoptera
- Superfamily: Noctuoidea
- Family: Erebidae
- Subfamily: Arctiinae
- Genus: Logunovium
- Species: L. nigricostum

Binomial name
- Logunovium nigricostum (Holland, 1893)

Synonyms
- Aloa nigricosta Holland, 1893

Species of moth

Logunovium nigricostum is a moth in the family Erebidae. It was described by William Jacob Holland in 1893. It is found in Cameroon, the Democratic Republic of the Congo, Gabon, Ghana, Nigeria, Senegal, and the Gambia.
