= Paralpenus atripes =

Scientific classification
- Kingdom: Animalia
- Phylum: Arthropoda
- Class: Insecta
- Order: Lepidoptera
- Superfamily: Noctuoidea
- Family: Erebidae
- Subfamily: Arctiinae
- Genus: Paralpenus
- Species: P. atripes

Binomial name
- Paralpenus atripes (Hampson, 1909)

Synonyms
- Hyphantria atripes Hampson, 1909

Species of moth

Paralpenus atripes is a moth of the family Erebidae. It was described by George Hampson in 1909. It is found in Ghana.
