= Amerila fennia =

Scientific classification
- Kingdom: Animalia
- Phylum: Arthropoda
- Class: Insecta
- Order: Lepidoptera
- Superfamily: Noctuoidea
- Family: Erebidae
- Subfamily: Arctiinae
- Genus: Amerila
- Species: A. fennia

Binomial name
- Amerila fennia (H. Druce, 1887)

Synonyms
- Pelochyta fennia H. Druce, 1887; Rhodogastria metasarca Hampson, 1911

Species of moth

Amerila fennia is a species of moth of the subfamily Arctiinae. It was described by Herbert Druce in 1887. It is found in Cameroon, the Democratic Republic of the Congo, Gabon, Ghana, Ivory Coast, Liberia, Nigeria, Senegal, Tanzania, the Gambia and Uganda.

The larvae feed on Dracaena species.
