= Melisa croceipes =

Scientific classification
- Domain: Eukaryota
- Kingdom: Animalia
- Phylum: Arthropoda
- Class: Insecta
- Order: Lepidoptera
- Superfamily: Noctuoidea
- Family: Erebidae
- Subfamily: Arctiinae
- Genus: Melisa
- Species: M. croceipes

Binomial name
- Melisa croceipes (Aurivillius, 1892)

Synonyms
- Balacra croceipes Aurivillius, 1892; Melisa atavistis Hampson, 1911; Melisa atavistis f. mariae Dufrane, 1945

Species of moth

Melisa croceipes is a moth of the family Erebidae. It was described by Per Olof Christopher Aurivillius in 1892 and is found in Cameroon, the Democratic Republic of the Congo, Equatorial Guinea and Ghana.
