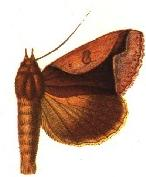

Scientific classification
- Kingdom: Animalia
- Phylum: Arthropoda
- Class: Insecta
- Order: Lepidoptera
- Superfamily: Noctuoidea
- Family: Noctuidae (?)
- Genus: Euminucia
- Species: E. orthogona

Binomial name
- Euminucia orthogona Hampson, 1913

Synonyms
- Euminucia camerunica Strand, 1913

= Euminucia orthogona =

Species of moth

Euminucia orthogona is a species of moth of the family Noctuidae first described by George Hampson in 1913. It is found in Ghana and Gabon.
