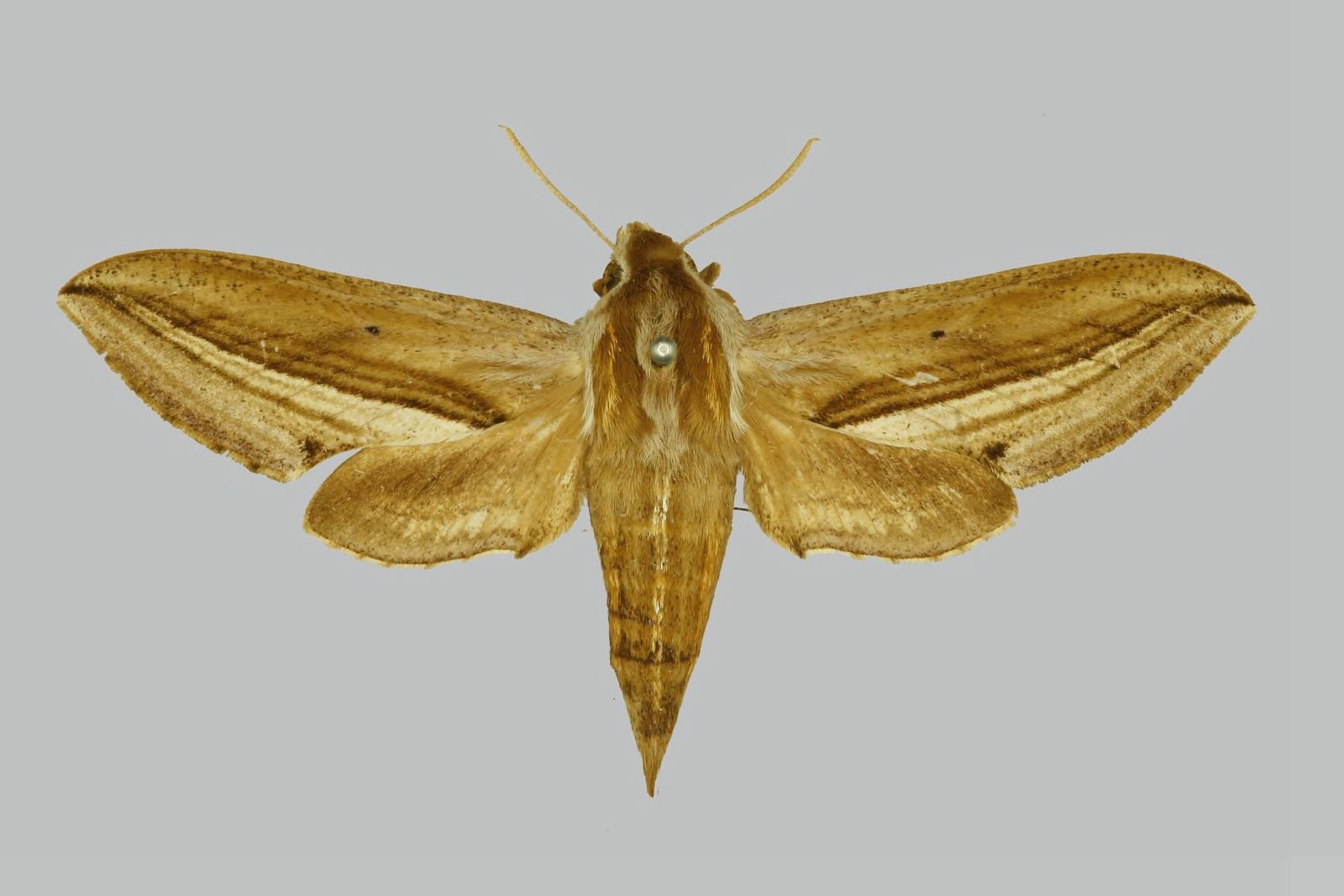

Scientific classification
- Kingdom: Animalia
- Phylum: Arthropoda
- Class: Insecta
- Order: Lepidoptera
- Family: Sphingidae
- Genus: Theretra
- Species: T. perkeo

Binomial name
- Theretra perkeo Rothschild & Jordan, 1903

= Theretra perkeo =

Species of moth

Theretra perkeo is a moth of the family Sphingidae. It is known from the arid areas north of the equatorial forest belt, from Senegal to northern Uganda.

The length of the forewings is 19–21 mm.
