= Xeneboda kumasiana =

Scientific classification
- Domain: Eukaryota
- Kingdom: Animalia
- Phylum: Arthropoda
- Class: Insecta
- Order: Lepidoptera
- Family: Tortricidae
- Genus: Xeneboda
- Species: X. kumasiana

Binomial name
- Xeneboda kumasiana Razowski & Tuck, 2000

Species of insect

Xeneboda kumasiana is a species of moth of the family Tortricidae. It is found in Ghana.
