= Accra viridis =

Scientific classification
- Domain: Eukaryota
- Kingdom: Animalia
- Phylum: Arthropoda
- Class: Insecta
- Order: Lepidoptera
- Family: Tortricidae
- Genus: Accra
- Species: A. viridis

Binomial name
- Accra viridis (Walsingham, 1891)

Synonyms
- Argyrotoxa viridis Walsingham, 1891

Species of moth

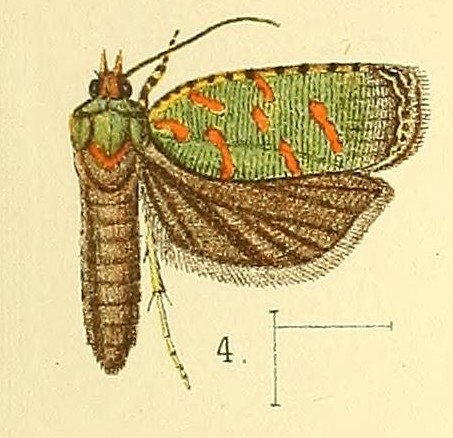
Accra viridis

Accra viridis is a species of moth of the family Tortricidae. It was first described by Thomas de Grey, 6th Baron Walsingham in 1891. It is found in Cameroon, the Central African Republic, the Democratic Republic of the Congo, Ghana, Nigeria and Uganda.

The wingspan is about 14 mm. The forewings are bright bluish green, the costal and apical margins narrowly brownish ochreous with a series of about fourteen black dots and spots of different sizes from the base to the apex, some of which are margined on their lower edges with red. There are also some black spots along the apical margin. There are also about seven conspicuous vermilion-red spots or streaks. The hindwings are brown, the costal margin straw white nearly to the apex.
