= Ortharbela diagonalis =

Scientific classification
- Kingdom: Animalia
- Phylum: Arthropoda
- Class: Insecta
- Order: Lepidoptera
- Family: Cossidae
- Genus: Ortharbela
- Species: O. diagonalis

Binomial name
- Ortharbela diagonalis (Hampson, 1910)

Synonyms
- Arbelodes diagonalis Hampson, 1910

Species of moth

Ortharbela diagonalis is a moth in the family Cossidae. It is found in Ghana.
