= Barbasphecia ares =

Scientific classification
- Kingdom: Animalia
- Phylum: Arthropoda
- Class: Insecta
- Order: Lepidoptera
- Family: Sesiidae
- Genus: Barbasphecia
- Species: B. ares

Binomial name
- Barbasphecia ares Pühringer & Sáfián, 2011

Species of moth

Barbasphecia ares is a moth of the family Sesiidae. It is typically found in Ghana.
