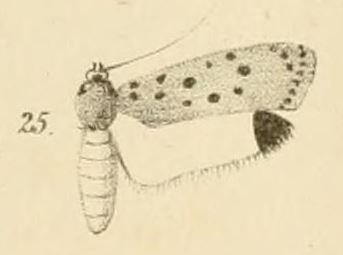

Scientific classification
- Domain: Eukaryota
- Kingdom: Animalia
- Phylum: Arthropoda
- Class: Insecta
- Order: Lepidoptera
- Family: Depressariidae
- Genus: Ethmia
- Species: E. oculigera

Binomial name
- Ethmia oculigera '(Möschler, 1884)

Synonyms
- Psecadia oculigera Möschler, 1884

= Ethmia oculigera =

Species of moth

Ethmia oculigera is a moth in the family Depressariidae.

== Distribution ==
It is found in Congo, Ghana, Kenya, Nigeria, Madagascar and South Africa.
