= Barbasphecia hephaistos =

Scientific classification
- Kingdom: Animalia
- Phylum: Arthropoda
- Class: Insecta
- Order: Lepidoptera
- Family: Sesiidae
- Genus: Barbasphecia
- Species: B. hephaistos

Binomial name
- Barbasphecia hephaistos Pühringer & Sáfián, 2011

Species of moth

Barbasphecia hephaistos is a moth of the family Sesiidae. It is known from Ghana.

The larvae feed on Loranthus species.
