= Mecodopsis =

Scientific classification
- Kingdom: Animalia
- Phylum: Arthropoda
- Class: Insecta
- Order: Lepidoptera
- Superfamily: Noctuoidea
- Family: Erebidae
- Subfamily: Calpinae
- Genus: Mecodopsis; Hampson, 1926
- Species: M. conisema

Binomial name
- Mecodopsis conisema Hampson, 1926

Genus of moths

Mecodopsis is a monotypic moth genus of the family Erebidae. Its only species, Mecodopsis conisema, is found in Ghana and Nigeria. Both the genus and the species were first described by George Hampson in 1926.
