= Episannina albifrons =

Scientific classification
- Kingdom: Animalia
- Phylum: Arthropoda
- Class: Insecta
- Order: Lepidoptera
- Family: Sesiidae
- Genus: Episannina
- Species: E. albifrons

Binomial name
- Episannina albifrons (Hampson, 1910)

Synonyms
- Lepidopoda albifrons Hampson, 1910

Species of moth

Episannina albifrons is a moth of the family Sesiidae. It is known from Ghana.
