= Baniopis =

Scientific classification
- Kingdom: Animalia
- Phylum: Arthropoda
- Class: Insecta
- Order: Lepidoptera
- Superfamily: Noctuoidea
- Family: Erebidae
- Subfamily: Calpinae
- Genus: Baniopis; Hampson, 1926
- Species: B. pulverea

Binomial name
- Baniopis pulverea Hampson, 1926

Genus of moths

Baniopis is a monotypic moth genus of the family Erebidae. Its only species, Baniopis pulverea, is found in Ghana. Both the genus and species were first described by George Hampson in 1926.
