= Paremonia argentata =

Scientific classification
- Kingdom: Animalia
- Phylum: Arthropoda
- Class: Insecta
- Order: Lepidoptera
- Superfamily: Noctuoidea
- Family: Erebidae
- Subfamily: Arctiinae
- Genus: Paremonia
- Species: P. argentata

Binomial name
- Paremonia argentata Hampson, 1914

Species of moth

Paremonia argentata is a moth of the subfamily Arctiinae. It was described by George Hampson in 1914. It is found in Ghana and Kenya.
