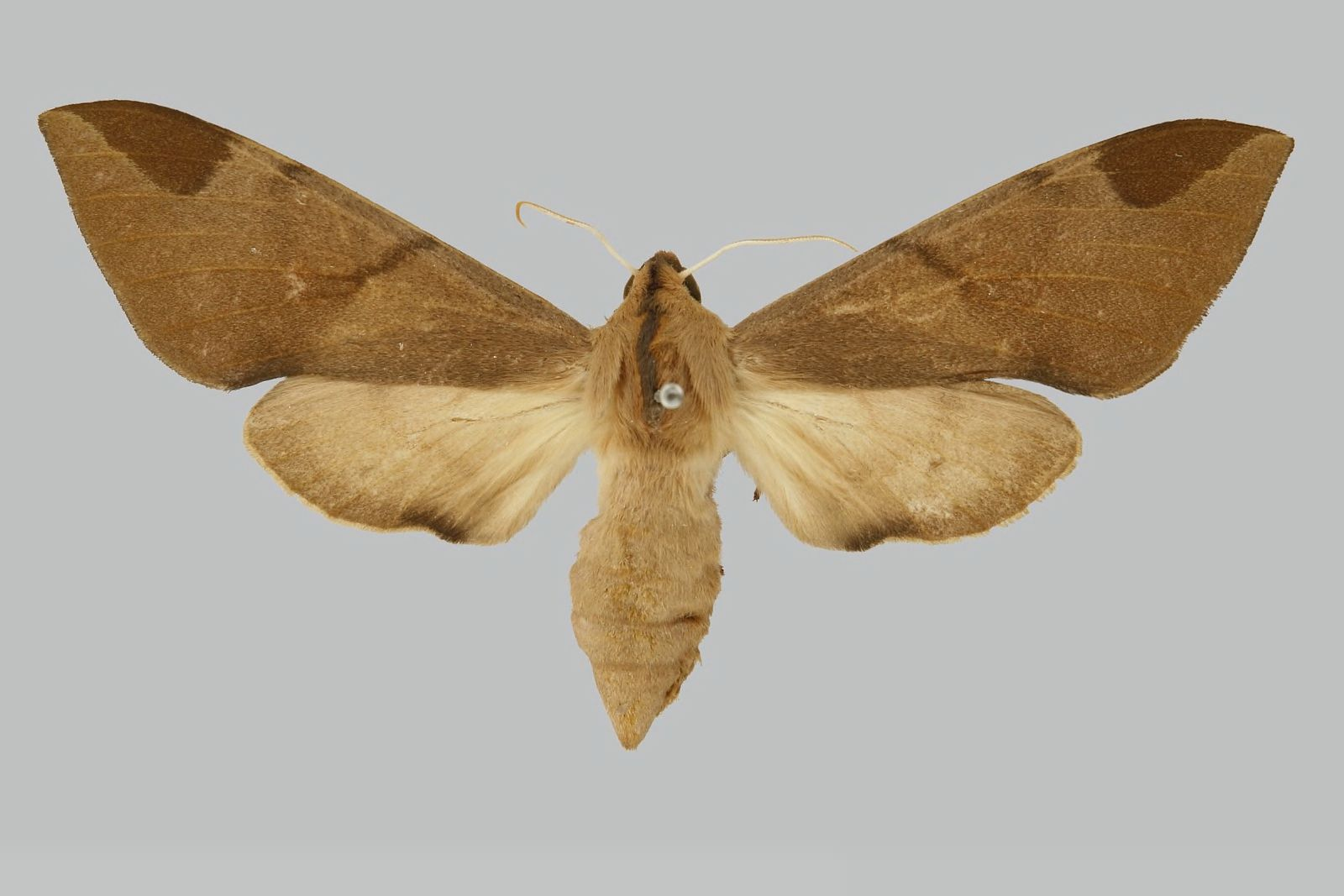

Scientific classification
- Kingdom: Animalia
- Phylum: Arthropoda
- Class: Insecta
- Order: Lepidoptera
- Family: Sphingidae
- Tribe: Smerinthini
- Genus: Pseudopolyptychus; Carcasson, 1968
- Species: P. foliaceus

Binomial name
- Pseudopolyptychus foliaceus (Rothschild & Jordan, 1903)

Synonyms
- Polyptychus foliaceus Rothschild & Jordan, 1903

= Pseudopolyptychus =

Genus of moths

Pseudopolyptychus is a genus of moths in the family Sphingidae, containing one species, Pseudopolyptychus foliaceus, which is known from Guinea, Ivory Coast, Burkina Faso, Togo and from Ghana to Nigeria.

It is an undistinguished species, with pale brown forewings overlain with darker brown markings. The thorax is pale brown with a longitudinal dark brown median line. The proboscis is very short. The forewing upperside is pale brown with a subapical darker brown triangular patch on the costa and a dark brown line crossing the discal cell, expanding into a postmedian trapezoidal darker brown patch.
