= Menegites sulphurea =

Scientific classification
- Kingdom: Animalia
- Phylum: Arthropoda
- Clade: Pancrustacea
- Class: Insecta
- Order: Lepidoptera
- Superfamily: Noctuoidea
- Family: Erebidae
- Subfamily: Arctiinae
- Genus: Menegites
- Species: M. sulphurea

Binomial name
- Menegites sulphurea (Bartel, 1903)

Synonyms
- Spilosoma sulphurea Bartel, 1903

Species of moth

Menegites sulphurea is a moth of the family Erebidae. It was described by Max Bartel in 1903. It is found in Cameroon, the Democratic Republic of the Congo, Ghana, Kenya, Liberia, Malawi, Rwanda and Uganda.
