= Chalcidoptera argyrophoralis =

Scientific classification
- Kingdom: Animalia
- Phylum: Arthropoda
- Clade: Pancrustacea
- Class: Insecta
- Order: Lepidoptera
- Family: Crambidae
- Genus: Chalcidoptera
- Species: C. argyrophoralis

Binomial name
- Chalcidoptera argyrophoralis Hampson, 1912

Species of moth

Chalcidoptera argyrophoralis is a moth in the family Crambidae. It was described by George Hampson in 1912. It is found in Ghana.
