= Episannina flavicincta =

Scientific classification
- Kingdom: Animalia
- Phylum: Arthropoda
- Class: Insecta
- Order: Lepidoptera
- Family: Sesiidae
- Genus: Episannina
- Species: E. flavicincta

Binomial name
- Episannina flavicincta Hampson, 1919

Species of moth

Episannina flavicincta is a moth of the family Sesiidae. It is known from Ghana.
