= Paralpenus flavizonatus =

Scientific classification
- Kingdom: Animalia
- Phylum: Arthropoda
- Class: Insecta
- Order: Lepidoptera
- Superfamily: Noctuoidea
- Family: Erebidae
- Subfamily: Arctiinae
- Genus: Paralpenus
- Species: P. flavizonatus

Binomial name
- Paralpenus flavizonatus (Hampson, 1911)

Synonyms
- Amsacta flavizonata Hampson, 1911

Species of moth

Paralpenus flavizonatus is a moth of the family Erebidae. It was described by George Hampson in 1911 and is found in both countries of Ghana and Nigeria.

The larvae feed on Gossypium species.
