= Euminucia conflua =

Scientific classification
- Kingdom: Animalia
- Phylum: Arthropoda
- Class: Insecta
- Order: Lepidoptera
- Superfamily: Noctuoidea
- Family: Noctuidae (?)
- Genus: Euminucia
- Species: E. conflua

Binomial name
- Euminucia conflua Hampson, 1913

Synonyms
- Euminucia ligulifera Strand, 1913

Species of moth

Euminucia conflua is a species of moth of the family Noctuidae first described by George Hampson in 1913. It is found in Ghana.
