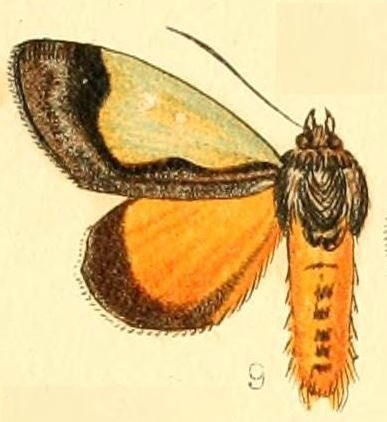

Scientific classification
- Kingdom: Animalia
- Phylum: Arthropoda
- Class: Insecta
- Order: Lepidoptera
- Superfamily: Noctuoidea
- Family: Noctuidae
- Genus: Tuerta
- Species: T. chrysochlora

Binomial name
- Tuerta chrysochlora Walker, 1869

Synonyms
- Eudryas liturata Aurivillius, 1892

= Tuerta chrysochlora =

Species of moth

Tuerta chrysochlora is a moth of the family Noctuidae. It is found in Burundi, Cameroon, the Democratic Republic of Congo, Equatorial Guinea, Gabon, Ghana, Nigeria and Sierra Leone.
