= Asuroides atricraspeda =

Scientific classification
- Kingdom: Animalia
- Phylum: Arthropoda
- Class: Insecta
- Order: Lepidoptera
- Superfamily: Noctuoidea
- Family: Erebidae
- Subfamily: Arctiinae
- Genus: Asuroides
- Species: A. atricraspeda

Binomial name
- Asuroides atricraspeda Hampson, 1914

Synonyms
- Asura atricraspeda Hampson, 1914

Species of moth

Asuroides atricraspeda is a moth of the family Erebidae. It was described by George Hampson in 1914. It is found in the Democratic Republic of the Congo, Ghana, Kenya and Sierra Leone.
