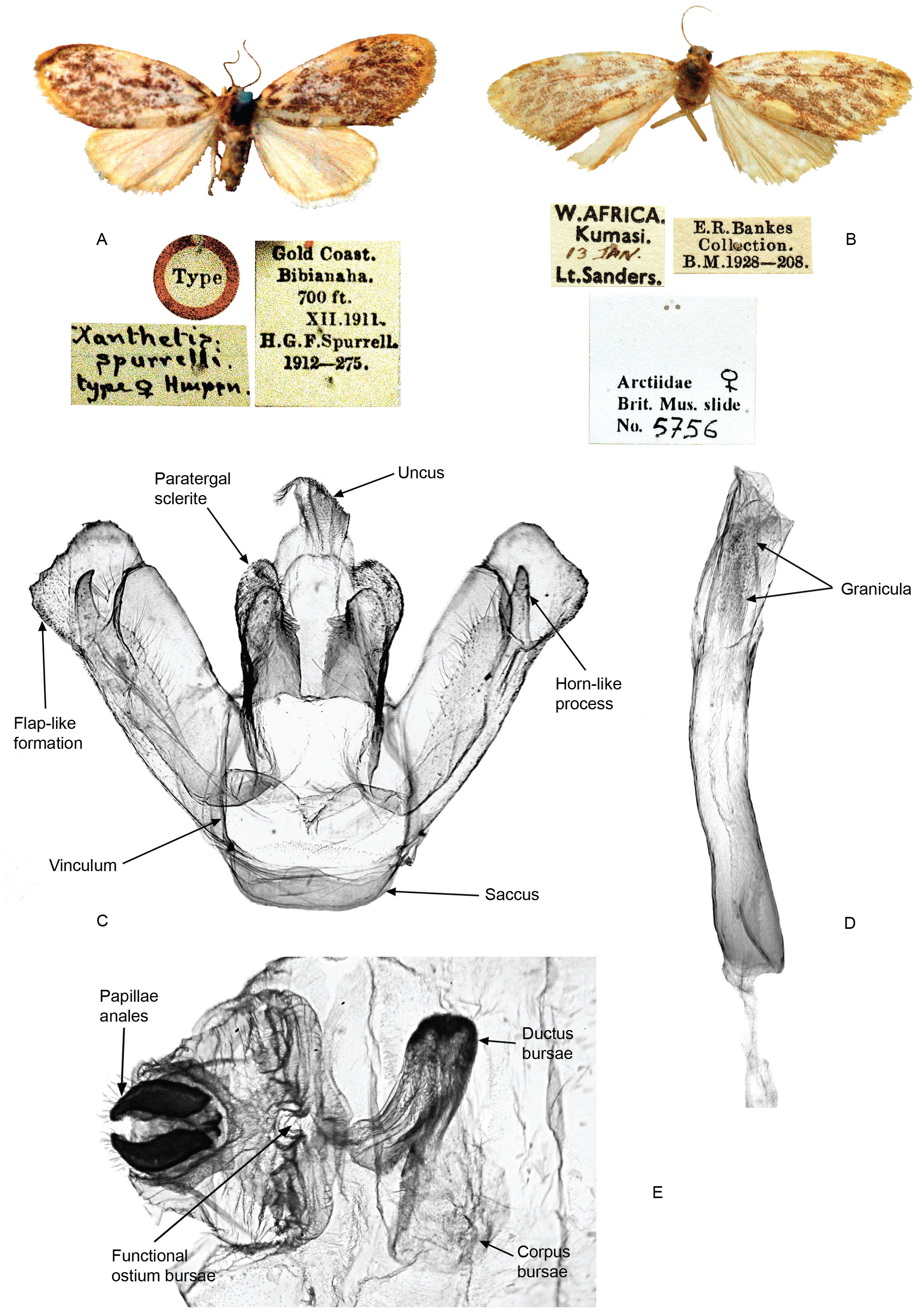
- Palaeugoa spurrelli

Scientific classification
- Domain: Eukaryota
- Kingdom: Animalia
- Phylum: Arthropoda
- Class: Insecta
- Order: Lepidoptera
- Superfamily: Noctuoidea
- Family: Erebidae
- Subfamily: Arctiinae
- Tribe: Lithosiini
- Genus: Palaeugoa; Durante, 2012
- Species: P. spurrelli

Binomial name
- Palaeugoa spurrelli (Hampson, 1914)

Synonyms
- Xanthetis spurrelli Hampson, 1914; Asura spurrelli

= Palaeugoa =

Genus of moths

Palaeugoa is a genus of moths in the family Erebidae. It contains only one species, Palaeugoa spurrelli, which is found in Ghana and Kenya.
