= List of moths of the Gambia =

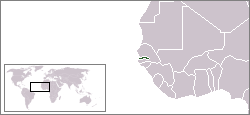
Location of the Gambia

There are about 700 known moth species in The Gambia. The moths (mostly nocturnal) and butterflies (mostly diurnal) together make up the taxonomic order Lepidoptera.

This is a list of moth species which have been recorded in The Gambia.

== Arctiidae ==
- Acantharctia mundata (Walker, 1865)
- Acanthofrontia atricosta Hampson, 1918
- Aloa moloneyi (Druce, 1887)
- Alpenus maculosa (Stoll, 1781)
- Amata tomasina (Butler, 1876)
- Amerila fennia (Druce, 1887)
- Argina amanda (Boisduval, 1847)
- Argina leonina (Walker, 1865)
- Binna scita (Walker, 1865)
- Creatonotos leucanioides Holland, 1893
- Cyana rejecta (Walker, 1854)
- Estigmene unilinea Rothschild, 1910
- Euchromia guineensis (Fabricius, 1775)
- Euchromia lethe (Fabricius, 1775)
- Logunovium nigricosta (Holland, 1893)
- Madagascarctia madagascariensis (Butler, 1882)
- Oedaleosia nigricosta Hampson, 1900
- Poliosia albida Hampson, 1914
- Pseudothyretes perpusilla (Walker, 1856)
- Spilosoma crossi (Rothschild, 1910)
- Spilosoma curvilinea Walker, 1855
- Spilosoma rava (Druce, 1898)
- Thyretes caffra Wallengren, 1863
- Trichaeta bivittata (Walker, 1864)
- Utetheisa pulchella (Linnaeus, 1758)

== Autostichidae ==
- Procometis acutipennis (Walsingham, 1891)

== Bombycidae ==
- Racinoa ianthe (Druce, 1887)

== Brachodidae ==
- Nigilgia albitogata (Walsingham, 1891)

== Coleophoridae ==
- Holcocera irroratella (Walsingham, 1891)
- Licmocera lyonetiella Walsingham, 1891

== Cosmopterigidae ==
- Alloclita gambiella (Walsingham, 1891)
- Anatrachyntis simplex (Walsingham, 1891)
- Cnemidolophus lavernellus Walsingham, 1881
- Macrobathra distincta (Walsingham, 1891)
- Macrobathra fasciata (Walsingham, 1891)

== Cossidae ==
- Macrocossus toluminus (Druce, 1887)

== Crambidae ==
- Bocchoris inspersalis (Zeller, 1852)
- Cadarena sinuata (Fabricius, 1781)
- Calamotropha discellus (Walker, 1863)
- Charltona albimixtalis Hampson, 1919
- Cnaphalocrocis trapezalis (Guenée, 1854)
- Conotalis aurantifascia (Hampson, 1895)
- Diaphana indica (Saunders, 1851)
- Dysallacta negatalis (Walker, 1859)
- Glyphodes stolalis Guenée, 1854
- Haimbachia proalbivenalis (Błeszyński, 1961)
- Haritalodes derogata (Fabricius, 1775)
- Herpetogramma phaeopteralis (Guenée, 1854)
- Nausinoe geometralis (Guenée, 1854)
- Nomophila noctuella ([Denis & Schiffermüller], 1775)
- Notarcha cassusalis (Walker, 1859)
- Palpita claralis (Walker, 1865)
- Palpita elealis (Walker, 1859)
- Palpita unionalis (Hübner, 1796)
- Pleuroptya aegrotalis (Zeller, 1852)
- Sceliodes laisalis (Walker, 1859)
- Spoladea recurvalis (Fabricius, 1775)
- Stemorrhages sericea (Drury, 1773)
- Syllepte ovialis (Walker, 1859)
- Syllepte sarronalis (Walker, 1859)
- Zebronia phenice (Cramer, 1780)

== Drepanidae ==
- Negera confusa Walker, 1855
- Negera natalensis (Felder, 1874)

== Elachistidae ==
- Ptilobola inornatella (Walsingham, 1891)
- Stenoma complanella (Walsingham, 1891)

== Eupterotidae ==
- Jana tantalus Herrich-Schäffer, 1854
- Phiala costipuncta (Herrich-Schäffer, 1855)
- Vianga tristis Druce, 1896

== Gelechiidae ==
- Anarsia agricola Walsingham, 1891
- Anarsia inculta Walsingham, 1891
- Brachmia septella (Zeller, 1852)
- Dactylethrella bryophilella (Walsingham, 1891)
- Dichomeris marginata (Walsingham, 1891)
- Dichomeris marmoratus (Walsingham, 1891)
- Onebala zulu (Walsingham, 1881)
- Polyhymno cleodorella Walsingham, 1891
- Prasodryas fracticostella (Walsingham, 1891)
- Thiotricha tenuis (Walsingham, 1891)
- Tricyanaula metallica (Walsingham, 1891)

== Geometridae ==
- Aphilopota otoessa Prout, 1954
- Chiasmia amarata (Guenée, 1858)
- Chiasmia angolaria (Snellen, 1872)
- Chiasmia rectistriaria (Herrich-Schäffer, 1854)
- Chiasmia semitecta (Walker, 1861)
- Comibaena leucospilata (Walker, 1863)
- Comostolopsis stillata (Felder & Rogenhofer, 1875)
- Erastria leucicolor (Butler, 1875)
- Melinoessa fulvata (Drury, 1773)
- Neromia enotes Prout, 1917
- Orbamia octomaculata (Wallengren, 1872)
- Orbamia renimacula (Prout, 1926)
- Pingasa lahayei (Oberthür, 1887)
- Pingasa rhadamaria (Guenée, 1858)
- Scopula internata (Guenée, 1857)
- Scopula lactaria (Walker, 1861)
- Scopula latitans Prout, 1920
- Victoria perornata Warren, 1898
- Zamarada clavigera D. S. Fletcher, 1974
- Zamarada dilucida Warren, 1909
- Zamarada nasuta Warren, 1897
- Zamarada phrontisaria Swinhoe, 1904

== Gracillariidae ==
- Acrocercops bifasciata (Walsingham, 1891)
- Lamprolectica apicistrigata (Walsingham, 1891)

== Lasiocampidae ==
- Leipoxais directa (Walker, 1865)
- Pachytrina honrathii (Dewitz, 1881)
- Philotherma unicolor (Walker, 1855)

== Lecithoceridae ==
- Odites carterella Walsingham, 1891
- Odites inconspicua Walsingham, 1891
- Protolychnis marginata (Walsingham, 1891)
- Timyra extranea Walsingham, 1891

== Lymantriidae ==
- Aroa discalis Walker, 1855
- Crorema mentiens Walker, 1855
- Dasychira pytna (Druce, 1898)
- Dasychira remota Druce, 1887
- Euproctis crocata (Boisduval, 1847)
- Euproctis producta (Walker, 1863)
- Euproctis pygmaea (Walker, 1855)
- Euproctoides acrisia Plötz, 1880
- Laelia subrosea (Walker, 1855)
- Naroma varipes (Walker, 1865)
- Polymona rufifemur Walker, 1855

== Lyonetiidae ==
- Micropostega aeneofasciata Walsingham, 1891

== Metarbelidae ==
- Kroonia carteri Lehmann, 2010

== Nepticulidae ==
- Stigmella birgittae Gustafsson, 1985
- Stigmella zizyphi (Walsingham, 1911)

== Noctuidae ==
- Acanthodelta janata (Linnaeus, 1758)
- Achaea albicilia (Walker, 1858)
- Achaea ezea (Cramer, 1779)
- Achaea illustrata Walker, 1858
- Achaea mormoides Walker, 1858
- Acontia basifera Walker, 1857
- Acontia citrelinea Bethune-Baker, 1911
- Acontia imitatrix Wallengren, 1856
- Acontia insocia (Walker, 1857)
- Acontia transfigurata Wallengren, 1856
- Acontia wahlbergi Wallengren, 1856
- Aegocera rectilinea Boisduval, 1836
- Agrotis biconica Kollar, 1844
- Amyna axis Guenée, 1852
- Anoba remota (Druce, 1887)
- Anticarsia rubricans (Boisduval, 1833)
- Asota speciosa (Drury, 1773)
- Aspidifrontia hemileuca (Hampson, 1909)
- Audea paulumnodosa Kühne, 2005
- Bareia incidens Walker, 1858
- Brithys crini (Fabricius, 1775)
- Chrysodeixis acuta (Walker, [1858])
- Crameria amabilis (Drury, 1773)
- Cyligramma fluctuosa (Drury, 1773)
- Cyligramma latona (Cramer, 1775)
- Cyligramma limacina (Guérin-Méneville, 1832)
- Dysgonia arcifera (Druce, 1912)
- Dysgonia torrida (Guenée, 1852)
- Entomogramma mediocris Walker, 1865
- Erebus walkeri (Butler, 1875)
- Ericeia congregata (Walker, 1858)
- Ericeia sobria Walker, 1858
- Eudocima materna (Linnaeus, 1767)
- Eulocastra monozona Hampson, 1910
- Eutelia callichroma (Distant, 1901)
- Eutelia violescens (Hampson, 1912)
- Godasa sidae (Fabricius, 1793)
- Grammodes geometrica (Fabricius, 1775)
- Grammodes stolida (Fabricius, 1775)
- Helicoverpa assulta (Guenée, 1852)
- Heliophisma klugii (Boisduval, 1833)
- Herpeperas rudis (Walker, 1865)
- Hypena jussalis Walker, 1859
- Hypena obacerralis Walker, [1859]
- Hypopyra capensis Herrich-Schäffer, 1854
- Janseodes melanospila (Guenée, 1852)
- Leucania insulicola Guenée, 1852
- Leucania loreyi (Duponchel, 1827)
- Masalia albiseriata (Druce, 1903)
- Masalia decorata (Moore, 1881)
- Masalia galatheae (Wallengren, 1856)
- Masalia nubila (Hampson, 1903)
- Masalia terracottoides (Rothschild, 1921)
- Mentaxya rimosa (Guenée, 1852)
- Miniodes discolor Guenée, 1852
- Misa memnonia Karsch, 1895
- Mitrophrys magna (Walker, 1854)
- Mitrophrys menete (Cramer, 1775)
- Mocis mayeri (Boisduval, 1833)
- Ophiusa subdiversa (L. B. Prout, 1919)
- Ophiusa tirhaca (Cramer, 1777)
- Oraesia emarginata (Fabricius, 1794)
- Pandesma quenavadi Guenée, 1852
- Plecoptera reversa (Walker, 1865)
- Polydesma umbricola Boisduval, 1833
- Polytelodes florifera (Walker, 1858)
- Rhabdophera clathrum (Guenée, 1852)
- Rhynchina leucodonta Hampson, 1910
- Rhynchina tinctalis (Zeller, 1852)
- Serrodes nigha Guenée, 1852
- Sphingomorpha chlorea (Cramer, 1777)
- Spodoptera cilium Guenée, 1852
- Spodoptera exempta (Walker, 1857)
- Spodoptera littoralis (Boisduval, 1833)
- Spodoptera mauritia (Boisduval, 1833)
- Trichoplusia ni (Hübner, [1803])
- Trigonodes hyppasia (Cramer, 1779)

== Nolidae ==
- Characoma ferrigrisea (Hampson, 1905)
- Leocyma camilla (Druce, 1887)
- Lophocrama phoenicochlora Hampson, 1912
- Neaxestis mesogonia (Hampson, 1905)
- Negeta luminosa (Walker, 1858)
- Neonegeta zelia (Druce, 1887)
- Pardoxia graellsii (Feisthamel, 1837)
- Selepa leucogonia (Hampson, 1905)
- Selepa violascens Hampson, 1912

== Notodontidae ==
- Anaphe panda (Boisduval, 1847)
- Antheua simplex Walker, 1855
- Desmeocraera latex (Druce, 1901)
- Epanaphe carteri (Walsingham, 1885)
- Epanaphe moloneyi (Druce, 1887)
- Tricholoba carteri (Druce, 1887)

== Oecophoridae ==
- Stathmopoda auriferella (Walker, 1864)
- Stathmopoda crassella Walsingham, 1891
- Stathmopoda maculata Walsingham, 1891

== Plutellidae ==
- Plutella xylostella (Linnaeus, 1758)

== Psychidae ==
- Eumeta cervina Druce, 1887

== Pterophoridae ==
- Hepalastis pumilio (Zeller, 1873)
- Megalorhipida leucodactylus (Fabricius, 1794)
- Pterophorus albidus (Zeller, 1852)
- Sphenarches anisodactylus (Walker, 1864)
- Trichoptilus vivax Meyrick, 1909

== Pyralidae ==
- Ditrachyptera verruciferella (Ragonot, 1888)
- Endotricha vinolentalis Ragonot, 1891
- Etiella zinckenella (Treitschke, 1832)
- Faveria dionysia (Zeller, 1846)
- Pempelia interniplagella (Ragonot, 1888)

== Saturniidae ==
- Cirina forda (Westwood, 1849)
- Epiphora bauhiniae (Guérin-Méneville, 1832)
- Imbrasia obscura (Butler, 1878)
- Ludia orinoptena Karsch, 1892
- Tagoropsis flavinata (Walker, 1865)

== Sphingidae ==
- Acherontia atropos (Linnaeus, 1758)
- Agrius convolvuli (Linnaeus, 1758)
- Basiothia medea (Fabricius, 1781)
- Cephonodes hylas (Linnaeus, 1771)
- Coelonia solani (Boisduval, 1833)
- Daphnis nerii (Linnaeus, 1758)
- Hippotion balsaminae (Walker, 1856)
- Hippotion celerio (Linnaeus, 1758)
- Hippotion eson (Cramer, 1779)
- Hippotion osiris (Dalman, 1823)
- Leucostrophus alterhirundo d'Abrera, 1987
- Lophostethus dumolinii (Angas, 1849)
- Nephele accentifera (Palisot de Beauvois, 1821)
- Nephele aequivalens (Walker, 1856)
- Nephele comma Hopffer, 1857
- Nephele funebris (Fabricius, 1793)
- Nephele peneus (Cramer, 1776)
- Nephele rosae Butler, 1875
- Pseudoclanis postica (Walker, 1856)
- Rufoclanis rosea (Druce, 1882)
- Temnora livida (Holland, 1889)
- Temnora scitula (Holland, 1889)

== Tineidae ==
- Autochthonus chalybiellus Walsingham, 1891
- Dasyses rugosella (Stainton, 1859)
- Monopis monachella (Hübner, 1796)
- Oxymachaeris niveocervina Walsingham, 1891
- Phereoeca praecox Gozmány & Vári, 1973
- Phereoeca proletaria (Meyrick, 1921)
- Sphallestasis creagra (Gozmány, 1968)
- Sphallestasis cristata (Gozmány, 1967)
- Tinea atomosella Walker, 1863
- Tinea taedia Gozmány, 1968
- Tinea translucens Meyrick, 1917
- Trichophaga mormopis Meyrick, 1935

== Tortricidae ==
- Ancylis falcata (Walsingham, 1891)
- Ancylis oculifera (Walsingham, 1891)
- Bactra bactrana (Kennel, 1901)
- Bactra endea Diakonoff, 1963
- Choristoneura occidentalis (Walsingham, 1891)
- Dichrorampha excisa Walsingham, 1891
- Eccopsis incultana (Walker, 1863)
- Eccopsis nebulana Walsingham, 1891
- Eccopsis wahlbergiana Zeller, 1852
- Grapholita dimidiata (Walsingham, 1891)
- Panegyra flavicostana (Walsingham, 1891)
- Paraeccopsis insellata (Meyrick, 1920)
- Phaecasiophora basicornis Walsingham, 1891
- Phaecasiophora variabilis Walsingham, 1891
- Pseudeboda gambiae Razowski, 1964
- Sanguinograptis albardana (Snellen, 1872)
- Syricoris apicipunctana (Walsingham, 1891)

== Uraniidae ==
- Dissoprumna erycinaria (Guenée, 1857)

== Xyloryctidae ==
- Eretmocera basistrigata Walsingham, 1889
- Eretmocera carteri Walsingham, 1889
- Eretmocera fuscipennis Zeller, 1852
- Eretmocera laetissima Zeller, 1852
- Eretmocera scatospila Zeller, 1852
- Scythris pangalactis Meyrick, 1933
- Scythris subeburnea (Walsingham, 1891)

== Yponomeutidae ==
- Atteva carteri (Walsingham, 1891)
