= Polyhymno leucocras =

Scientific classification
- Domain: Eukaryota
- Kingdom: Animalia
- Phylum: Arthropoda
- Class: Insecta
- Order: Lepidoptera
- Family: Gelechiidae
- Genus: Polyhymno
- Species: P. leucocras

Binomial name
- Polyhymno leucocras Walsingham 1911

Species of moth

Polyhymno leucocras is a moth of the family Gelechiidae. It was described by Thomas de Grey, 6th Baron Walsingham, in 1911. It is found in Mexico (Sonora).

The wingspan is 9–10 mm. The forewings are snow-white, with a rather broad brown costal band, the dorsal space beneath the fold being also completely filled with brown, from which a brown streak is ejected outward in the direction of the apex. The white costal streaks are in the same positions as in Polyhymno colleta, consisting of one long slender very oblique line commencing before the middle, followed by a shorter, less oblique line nearly meeting its apex, and two pairs of geminated white streaks in the costal and apical cilia. There is also a similar white patch in the terminal cilia, but instead of two black spots this contains a black streak with two black dots below it. A reduplicated brown line runs along the termen at the base of the cilia. The hindwings are a very pale grey.
