= Eccopsis inflicta =

Scientific classification
- Kingdom: Animalia
- Phylum: Arthropoda
- Class: Insecta
- Order: Lepidoptera
- Family: Tortricidae
- Genus: Eccopsis
- Species: E. inflicta

Binomial name
- Eccopsis inflicta (Meyrick, 1920)

Synonyms
- Polychrosis inflicta Meyrick, 1920; Proschistis inflicta Clarke, 1958

Species of moth

Eccopsis inflicta is a moth of the family Tortricidae first described by Edward Meyrick in 1920. It is found in Sri Lanka.
