= Charltona interstitalis =

Scientific classification
- Kingdom: Animalia
- Phylum: Arthropoda
- Clade: Pancrustacea
- Class: Insecta
- Order: Lepidoptera
- Family: Crambidae
- Subfamily: Crambinae
- Tribe: incertae sedis
- Genus: Charltona
- Species: C. interstitalis

Binomial name
- Charltona interstitalis Hampson, 1919

Synonyms
- Charltona interstitialis Błeszyński & Collins, 1962

Species of moth

Charltona interstitalis is a moth in the family Crambidae. It was described by George Hampson in 1919. It is found in Nigeria.
