= Thyretes buettikeri =

Scientific classification
- Kingdom: Animalia
- Phylum: Arthropoda
- Class: Insecta
- Order: Lepidoptera
- Superfamily: Noctuoidea
- Family: Erebidae
- Subfamily: Arctiinae
- Genus: Thyretes
- Species: T. buettikeri

Binomial name
- Thyretes buettikeri Wiltshire, 1983

Species of moth

Thyretes buettikeri is a moth in the family Erebidae. It was described by Wiltshire in 1983. It is found in Saudi Arabia.
