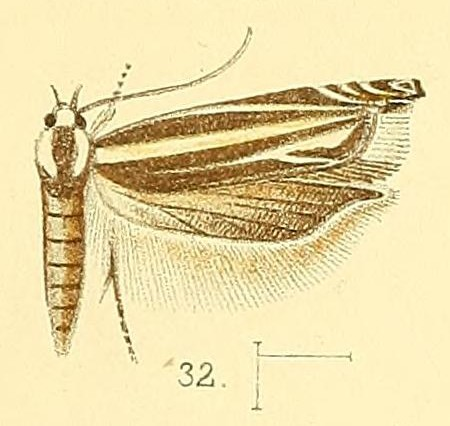
- Polyhymno cleodorella

Scientific classification
- Kingdom: Animalia
- Phylum: Arthropoda
- Clade: Pancrustacea
- Class: Insecta
- Order: Lepidoptera
- Family: Gelechiidae
- Subfamily: Thiotrichinae
- Genus: Polyhymno; Chambers, 1874

Type species
- Polyhymno luteostrigella Chambers, 1874

Synonyms
- Copocercia Zeller, 1877; Copoceria Bertkau, 1879; Oegoconoides Matsumura, 1931; Plectrocosma Meyrick, 1921

= Polyhymno =

Genus of moths

Polyhymno is a genus of moths in the family Gelechiidae.

== Species ==
Some species of this genus are:

- Polyhymno abaiella Amsel 1974
- Polyhymno acaciella Busck 1900
- Polyhymno alcimacha Meyrick 1918
- Polyhymno blastophora Janse, 1950
- Polyhymno cemiostomella Zeller 1877
- Polyhymno centrophora (Meyrick, 1921)
- Polyhymno charigramma Meyrick 1929
- Polyhymno chionarcha Meyrick, 1913
- Polyhymno cleodorella Walsingham, 1891
- Polyhymno colleta Walsingham 1911
- Polyhymno colorata Legrand, 1966
- Polyhymno conflicta Meyrick 1917
- Polyhymno convergens Walsingham 1911
- Polyhymno crambinella Zeller 1877
- Polyhymno deuteraula Meyrick, 1914
- Polyhymno erratica Janse, 1950
- Polyhymno eurydoxa Meyrick, 1909
- Polyhymno exalbida Omelko, 2011
- Polyhymno furcatella Janse, 1950
- Polyhymno fuscobasis (Omelko, 1993)
- Polyhymno gladiata Meyrick 1917
- Polyhymno hieracitis Meyrick, 1913
- Polyhymno hostilis Meyrick, 1918
- Polyhymno inermis Meyrick, 1913
- Polyhymno intorta Meyrick, 1918
- Polyhymno intortoides Janse, 1950
- Polyhymno leucocras Walsingham 1911
- Polyhymno lignicolor Janse, 1950
- Polyhymno luteostrigella Chambers, 1874
- Polyhymno millotiella Viette, 1954
- Polyhymno multifida Meyrick, 1917
- Polyhymno oxystola Meyrick, 1913
- Polyhymno palinorsa Meyrick, 1909
- Polyhymno paracma Meyrick, 1909
- Polyhymno paraintortoides Bidzilya & Mey, 2011
- Polyhymno pausimacha Meyrick, 1909
- Polyhymno pernitida Janse, 1950
- Polyhymno pleuracma Meyrick, 1926
- Polyhymno subaequalis Walsingham 1911
- Polyhymno tetragrapha Meyrick, 1913
- Polyhymno thinoclasta Meyrick, 1926
- Polyhymno tropaea Meyrick, 1908
- Polyhymno walsinghami Janse, 1950

== Former species ==
- Polyhymno attenuata (Omelko, 1993)
- Polyhymno celata (Omelko, 1993)
- Polyhymno corylella (Omelko, 1993)
- Polyhymno fusca (Omelko, 1993)
- Polyhymno indistincta (Omelko, 1993)
- Polyhymno obliquata (Matsumura, 1931)
- Polyhymno pontifera (Meyrick, 1934)
- Polyhymno sexstrigella Chambers 1874
- Polyhymno subocellea (Stephens, 1834)
- Polyhymno trapezoidella (Caradja, 1920)
- Polyhymno trichoma (Caradja, 1920)
