= Polyhymno exalbida =

Scientific classification
- Domain: Eukaryota
- Kingdom: Animalia
- Phylum: Arthropoda
- Class: Insecta
- Order: Lepidoptera
- Family: Gelechiidae
- Genus: Polyhymno
- Species: P. exalbida

Binomial name
- Polyhymno exalbida M. Omelko & N. Omelko, 2011

Species of moth

Polyhymno exalbida is a moth of the family Gelechiidae. It was described by Mikhail Mikhailovich Omelko and Natalia Viktorovna Omelko in 2011. It is found in the Russian Far East (Primorsky Krai).
