= Polyhymno thinoclasta =

Scientific classification
- Kingdom: Animalia
- Phylum: Arthropoda
- Class: Insecta
- Order: Lepidoptera
- Family: Gelechiidae
- Genus: Polyhymno
- Species: P. thinoclasta

Binomial name
- Polyhymno thinoclasta Meyrick, 1926

Species of moth

Polyhymno thinoclasta is a moth of the family Gelechiidae. It was described by Edward Meyrick in 1926. It is found in Zimbabwe.
