= Thyretes monteiroi =

Scientific classification
- Domain: Eukaryota
- Kingdom: Animalia
- Phylum: Arthropoda
- Class: Insecta
- Order: Lepidoptera
- Superfamily: Noctuoidea
- Family: Erebidae
- Subfamily: Arctiinae
- Genus: Thyretes
- Species: T. monteiroi

Binomial name
- Thyretes monteiroi Butler, 1876

Synonyms
- Thyretes angolensis Gaede, 1926; Eressades flavipunctata Bethune-Baker, 1911

Species of moth

Thyretes monteiroi is a moth in the family Erebidae. It was described by Arthur Gardiner Butler in 1876. It is found in Angola and the Democratic Republic of the Congo.
