= Polyhymno convergens =

Scientific classification
- Domain: Eukaryota
- Kingdom: Animalia
- Phylum: Arthropoda
- Class: Insecta
- Order: Lepidoptera
- Family: Gelechiidae
- Genus: Polyhymno
- Species: P. convergens

Binomial name
- Polyhymno convergens Walsingham 1911

Species of moth

Polyhymno convergens is a moth of the family Gelechiidae. It was described by Thomas de Grey, 6th Baron Walsingham, in 1911. It is found in Mexico (Guerrero).

The wingspan is about 16 mm. The forewings are greyish fuscous, longitudinally streaked with hoary whitish. There is a broad streak from the base below the costa extending over the fold, on the middle of which it is slightly broken. An arrow-like point following the fold towards the tornus and beyond the middle of the wing two hoary streaks, arising on the fold, converge towards the apex, nearly meeting the converging ends of four similar costal streaks of which the two outer are short and cuneiform, separated and followed by dark greyish fuscous, the tail-like apex also streaked above and beneath with fuscous and white alternately. An elongatesilvery patch lies within the termen, the space around it and towards the costa and subapical incision fawn-brown. The hindwings are brownish grey.
