= Thyretes ustjuzhanini =

Scientific classification
- Kingdom: Animalia
- Phylum: Arthropoda
- Class: Insecta
- Order: Lepidoptera
- Superfamily: Noctuoidea
- Family: Erebidae
- Subfamily: Arctiinae
- Genus: Thyretes
- Species: T. ustjuzhanini

Binomial name
- Thyretes ustjuzhanini Dubatolov, 2012

Species of moth

Thyretes ustjuzhanini is a moth in the subfamily Arctiinae. It was described by Vladimir Viktorovitch Dubatolov in 2012 and is endemic to Zimbabwe.
