= Polyhymno fuscobasis =

Scientific classification
- Domain: Eukaryota
- Kingdom: Animalia
- Phylum: Arthropoda
- Class: Insecta
- Order: Lepidoptera
- Family: Gelechiidae
- Genus: Polyhymno
- Species: P. fuscobasis

Binomial name
- Polyhymno fuscobasis (M. Omelko, 1993)

Synonyms
- Thiotricha fuscobasis M. Omelko, 1993

Species of moth

Polyhymno fuscobasis is a moth of the family Gelechiidae. It was described by Mikhail Mikhailovich Omelko in 1993. It is found in Russia.
