= Tricyanaula aurantiaca =

Scientific classification
- Domain: Eukaryota
- Kingdom: Animalia
- Phylum: Arthropoda
- Class: Insecta
- Order: Lepidoptera
- Family: Gelechiidae
- Genus: Tricyanaula
- Species: T. aurantiaca

Binomial name
- Tricyanaula aurantiaca (Walsingham, 1887)

Synonyms
- Strobisia aurantiaca Walsingham, 1887

Species of moth

Tricyanaula aurantiaca is a moth of the family Gelechiidae. It was described by Thomas de Grey, 6th Baron Walsingham, in 1887. It is found in Sri Lanka.

The wingspan is about 10 mm. The forewings are bright orange-red and a slender metallic streak, varying according to light from steel-blue to bright green, extends from the base along the costa rather more than one-third the length of the wing, where it diverges obliquely downwards and terminates on the discal cell. Its costal angle is followed by a short black oblique costal streak, and this again is followed after a rather wider interval by a bright steel-blue spot, beneath which is a still larger spot of the same colour reaching nearly to the dorsal margin, both edged with black scales. Beneath the first costal metallic streak is a similar streak also from the base, running along the fold to its middle, and below this again, near the dorsal margin, are a few similar steel-blue metallic scales. Beyond the outer spots the whole apical portion of the wing is deep brown, illuminated by one subcostal and three subapical metallic blue spots. The hindwings are brown.
