= Charltona cramboides =

Scientific classification
- Domain: Eukaryota
- Kingdom: Animalia
- Phylum: Arthropoda
- Class: Insecta
- Order: Lepidoptera
- Family: Crambidae
- Subfamily: Crambinae
- Tribe: incertae sedis
- Genus: Charltona
- Species: C. cramboides

Binomial name
- Charltona cramboides (Walker, 1865)

Synonyms
- Lithosia cramboides Walker, 1865

Species of moth

Charltona cramboides is a moth in the family Crambidae. It was described by Francis Walker in 1865. It is found in India.
