= Eccopsis deprinsi =

Scientific classification
- Domain: Eukaryota
- Kingdom: Animalia
- Phylum: Arthropoda
- Class: Insecta
- Order: Lepidoptera
- Family: Tortricidae
- Genus: Eccopsis
- Species: E. deprinsi

Binomial name
- Eccopsis deprinsi Aarvik, 2004

Species of moth

Eccopsis deprinsi is a species of moth of the family Tortricidae that is endemic to Kenya.
