= Charltona consociellus =

Scientific classification
- Domain: Eukaryota
- Kingdom: Animalia
- Phylum: Arthropoda
- Class: Insecta
- Order: Lepidoptera
- Family: Crambidae
- Subfamily: Crambinae
- Tribe: incertae sedis
- Genus: Charltona
- Species: C. consociellus

Binomial name
- Charltona consociellus (Walker, 1863)

Species of moth

Charltona consociellus is a moth in the family Crambidae. It was described by Francis Walker in 1863. The type location is listed as North America, but this is an error.
