= Charltona =

Scientific classification
- Domain: Eukaryota
- Kingdom: Animalia
- Phylum: Arthropoda
- Class: Insecta
- Order: Lepidoptera
- Family: Crambidae
- Subfamily: Crambinae
- Tribe: incertae sedis
- Genus: Charltona; C. Swinhoe, 1886

Synonyms
- Charltonia Hua, 2005

Genus of moths

Charltona is a genus of moths of the family Crambidae. The genus was erected by Charles Swinhoe in 1886.

== Description ==
Palpi porrect (extending forward), clothed with rough hair, and projecting about one and a half times the length of the head. Maxillary palpi triangularly dilated with hair. Frons rounded. Tibia with outer spurs about two-thirds length of inner. Wings long and narrow. Forewings with rectangular apex. Vein 3 from before angle of cell and veins 4 and 5 well separated at origin. Vein 7 straight and well separated with veins 8 and 9. Vein 10 free, whereas vein 11 curved and approximated to vein 12. Hindwings with vein 3 from near angle of cell. Veins 4 and 5 from angle and approximated for a short distance. Vein 6 absent and vein 7 anastomosing (fused) with vein 8.

== Species ==
- Charltona actinialis Hampson, 1919
- Charltona albidalis Hampson, 1919
- Charltona albimixtalis Hampson, 1919
- Charltona argyrastis Hampson, 1919
- Charltona ariadna Błeszyński, 1970
- Charltona atrifascialis Hampson, 1919
- Charltona bivitellus (Moore, 1872)
- Charltona cervinellus (Moore, 1872) (including C. interruptellus, which may be distinct)
- Charltona chrysopasta Hampson, 1910
- Charltona cramboides (Walker, 1865)
- Charltona desistalis (Walker, 1863)
- Charltona diatraeella (Hampson, 1896)
- Charltona endothermalis Hampson, 1919
- Charltona fusca Hampson, 1903
- Charltona inconspicuellus (Moore, 1872)
- Charltona interstitalis Hampson, 1919
- Charltona kala C. Swinhoe, 1886
- Charltona laminata Hampson, 1896
- Charltona ortellus (C. Swinhoe, 1887)
- Charltona plurivittalis Hampson, 1910
- Charltona rufalis Hampson, 1919
- Charltona synaula Meyrick, 1933
- Charltona trichialis (Hampson, 1903)
- Charltona tritonella (Hampson, 1898)

== Status unclear ==
- Charltona consociellus (Walker, 1863)
