= Polyhymno palinorsa =

Scientific classification
- Kingdom: Animalia
- Phylum: Arthropoda
- Clade: Pancrustacea
- Class: Insecta
- Order: Lepidoptera
- Family: Gelechiidae
- Genus: Polyhymno
- Species: P. palinorsa

Binomial name
- Polyhymno palinorsa Meyrick, 1909

Species of moth

Polyhymno palinorsa is a moth of the family Gelechiidae. It was described by English entomologist Edward Meyrick in 1909. It is found in Namibia and South Africa (Limpopo, Mpumalanga, Gauteng).

== Description ==
The wingspan is about 13 mm. The forewings are dark fuscous with a moderate white median longitudinal streak from the base to the termen, becoming linear posteriorly. There is a fine white line immediately beneath the costa from near the base to the middle, then running obliquely into the median streak near the termen and there is a white sub-dorsal line from near the base almost to the tornus. A white line is found along the submedian fold posteriorly almost rising out of the median streak. There is also a white somewhat upwards-oblique streak lying between the posterior half of this and the median streak and an oblique white line from the costa about two-thirds to the apex of the median streak, the extremity greyish. A pale ochreous-yellowish streak runs from above the posterior portion of this to the apex. The hindwings are grey.
