= Thyretes negus =

Scientific classification
- Kingdom: Animalia
- Phylum: Arthropoda
- Class: Insecta
- Order: Lepidoptera
- Superfamily: Noctuoidea
- Family: Erebidae
- Subfamily: Arctiinae
- Genus: Thyretes
- Species: T. negus

Binomial name
- Thyretes negus Oberthür, 1878

Synonyms
- Thyretes misa Strand, 1911; Thyretes misera Pinhey, 1975; Thyretes phasma Butler, 1897

Species of moth

Thyretes negus is a moth in the family Erebidae. It was described by Oberthür in 1878. It is found in the Democratic Republic of the Congo, Eritrea, Ethiopia, Guinea-Bissau, Kenya, Malawi, Namibia, Senegal, Sierra Leone and Togo.
