= Poliosia binotata =

Scientific classification
- Kingdom: Animalia
- Phylum: Arthropoda
- Class: Insecta
- Order: Lepidoptera
- Superfamily: Noctuoidea
- Family: Erebidae
- Subfamily: Arctiinae
- Genus: Poliosia
- Species: P. binotata

Binomial name
- Poliosia binotata (Hampson, 1893)

Synonyms
- Prabhasa binotata Hampson, 1893; Veslema binotata (Hampson, 1893)

Species of moth

Poliosia binotata is a moth in the family Erebidae. It was described by George Hampson in 1893. It is found in Sri Lanka.

== Description ==
In the female, the head, thorax and abdomen are pale fuscous. Anal tufts are ochreous. Forewings pale fuscous irrorated (sprinkled) with brown scales. A dark spot is found at end of the cell and another spot below vein 2. Hindwings are much paler.
