= Polyhymno walsinghami =

Scientific classification
- Domain: Eukaryota
- Kingdom: Animalia
- Phylum: Arthropoda
- Class: Insecta
- Order: Lepidoptera
- Family: Gelechiidae
- Genus: Polyhymno
- Species: P. walsinghami

Binomial name
- Polyhymno walsinghami Janse, 1950

Species of moth

Polyhymno walsinghami is a moth of the family Gelechiidae. It was described by Anthonie Johannes Theodorus Janse in 1950. It is found in Namibia and South Africa (what was Orange Free State, Mpumalanga, Gauteng, KwaZulu-Natal).
