= Charltona trichialis =

Scientific classification
- Domain: Eukaryota
- Kingdom: Animalia
- Phylum: Arthropoda
- Class: Insecta
- Order: Lepidoptera
- Family: Crambidae
- Subfamily: Crambinae
- Tribe: incertae sedis
- Genus: Charltona
- Species: C. trichialis

Binomial name
- Charltona trichialis (Hampson, 1903)

Synonyms
- Platytes trichialis Hampson, 1903

Species of moth

Charltona trichialis is a moth in the family Crambidae. It was described by George Hampson in 1903. It is found in India.
