= Polyhymno colorata =

Scientific classification
- Domain: Eukaryota
- Kingdom: Animalia
- Phylum: Arthropoda
- Class: Insecta
- Order: Lepidoptera
- Family: Gelechiidae
- Genus: Polyhymno
- Species: P. colorata

Binomial name
- Polyhymno colorata Legrand, 1966

Species of moth

Polyhymno colorata is a moth of the family Gelechiidae. It was described by Henry Legrand in 1966. It is found on the Seychelles (Aldabra, Cosmoledo, Menai).
