= Charltona fusca =

Scientific classification
- Domain: Eukaryota
- Kingdom: Animalia
- Phylum: Arthropoda
- Class: Insecta
- Order: Lepidoptera
- Family: Crambidae
- Subfamily: Crambinae
- Tribe: incertae sedis
- Genus: Charltona
- Species: C. fusca

Binomial name
- Charltona fusca Hampson, 1903

Species of moth

Charltona fusca is a moth in the family Crambidae. It was described by George Hampson in 1903. It is found in Sri Lanka.
