= Poliosia fragilis =

Scientific classification
- Domain: Eukaryota
- Kingdom: Animalia
- Phylum: Arthropoda
- Class: Insecta
- Order: Lepidoptera
- Superfamily: Noctuoidea
- Family: Erebidae
- Subfamily: Arctiinae
- Genus: Poliosia
- Species: P. fragilis

Binomial name
- Poliosia fragilis (T. P. Lucas, 1890)

Synonyms
- Brunia fragilis T. P. Lucas, 1890

Species of moth

Poliosia fragilis is a moth in the family Erebidae. It was described by Thomas Pennington Lucas in 1890. It is found in Queensland, Australia.
