= Poliosia punctivena =

Scientific classification
- Kingdom: Animalia
- Phylum: Arthropoda
- Class: Insecta
- Order: Lepidoptera
- Superfamily: Noctuoidea
- Family: Erebidae
- Subfamily: Arctiinae
- Genus: Poliosia
- Species: P. punctivena

Binomial name
- Poliosia punctivena (Hampson, 1898)

Synonyms
- Gampola punctivena Hampson, 1897

Species of moth

Poliosia punctivena is a moth in the family Erebidae. It was described by George Hampson in 1898. It is found in Sikkim, India.
