= Polyhymno crambinella =

Scientific classification
- Kingdom: Animalia
- Phylum: Arthropoda
- Clade: Pancrustacea
- Class: Insecta
- Order: Lepidoptera
- Family: Gelechiidae
- Genus: Polyhymno
- Species: P. crambinella

Binomial name
- Polyhymno crambinella (Zeller, 1877)

Synonyms
- Copocercia crambinella Zeller, 1877

Species of moth

Polyhymno crambinella is a moth of the family Gelechiidae. It was described by Philipp Christoph Zeller in 1877. It is found in Colombia.
