= Negera bimaculata =

Scientific classification
- Domain: Eukaryota
- Kingdom: Animalia
- Phylum: Arthropoda
- Class: Insecta
- Order: Lepidoptera
- Family: Drepanidae
- Genus: Negera
- Species: N. bimaculata

Binomial name
- Negera bimaculata (Holland, 1893)

Synonyms
- Ancistrota bimaculata Holland, 1893; Ancistrina immacualta Gaede, 1927

Species of hook-tip moth

Negera bimaculata is a moth in the family Drepanidae. It was described by William Jacob Holland in 1893. It is found in Cameroon, Gabon, Ghana and Liberia.
