= Polyhymno chionarcha =

Scientific classification
- Kingdom: Animalia
- Phylum: Arthropoda
- Class: Insecta
- Order: Lepidoptera
- Family: Gelechiidae
- Genus: Polyhymno
- Species: P. chionarcha

Binomial name
- Polyhymno chionarcha Meyrick, 1913

Species of moth

Polyhymno chionarcha is a moth of the family Gelechiidae. It was described by Edward Meyrick in 1913. It is found in Mozambique, Namibia, South Africa (KwaZulu-Natal, Gauteng, Mpumalanga, the Eastern Cape), Tanzania and Zimbabwe.

The wingspan is 9–11 mm. The forewings are shining white with an irregular blackish streak along the costa from the base to three-fourths, thickened near the base and towards the middle, terminated by an acutely angulated silvery-metallic transverse line running to the tornus, edged with blackish towards the tornus, the angle of this line filled by a fulvous spot preceded by two black marks. There is sometimes a small cloudy blackish spot on the dorsum before the middle. The area beyond this line is fulvous, on the costa blackish with two outwardly oblique white strigulae and one inwardly oblique. The hindwings are grey, more or less whitish tinged anteriorly.
