= Polyhymno pernitida =

Scientific classification
- Domain: Eukaryota
- Kingdom: Animalia
- Phylum: Arthropoda
- Class: Insecta
- Order: Lepidoptera
- Family: Gelechiidae
- Genus: Polyhymno
- Species: P. pernitida

Binomial name
- Polyhymno pernitida Janse, 1950

Species of moth

Polyhymno pernitida is a moth of the family Gelechiidae. It was described by Anthonie Johannes Theodorus Janse in 1950. It is found in Namibia.
