= Charltona argyrastis =

Scientific classification
- Domain: Eukaryota
- Kingdom: Animalia
- Phylum: Arthropoda
- Class: Insecta
- Order: Lepidoptera
- Family: Crambidae
- Subfamily: Crambinae
- Tribe: incertae sedis
- Genus: Charltona
- Species: C. argyrastis

Binomial name
- Charltona argyrastis Hampson, 1919

Synonyms
- Aurotalis argyrastis (Hampson, 1919)

Species of moth

Charltona argyrastis is a moth in the family Crambidae. It was described by George Hampson in 1919. It is found in Kenya.
