= Negera ramosa =

Scientific classification
- Domain: Eukaryota
- Kingdom: Animalia
- Phylum: Arthropoda
- Class: Insecta
- Order: Lepidoptera
- Family: Drepanidae
- Genus: Negera
- Species: N. ramosa

Binomial name
- Negera ramosa Watson, 1965

Species of hook-tip moth

Negera ramosa is a moth in the family Drepanidae. It was described by Watson in 1965. It is found in the Democratic Republic of Congo (Orientale) and Uganda.
