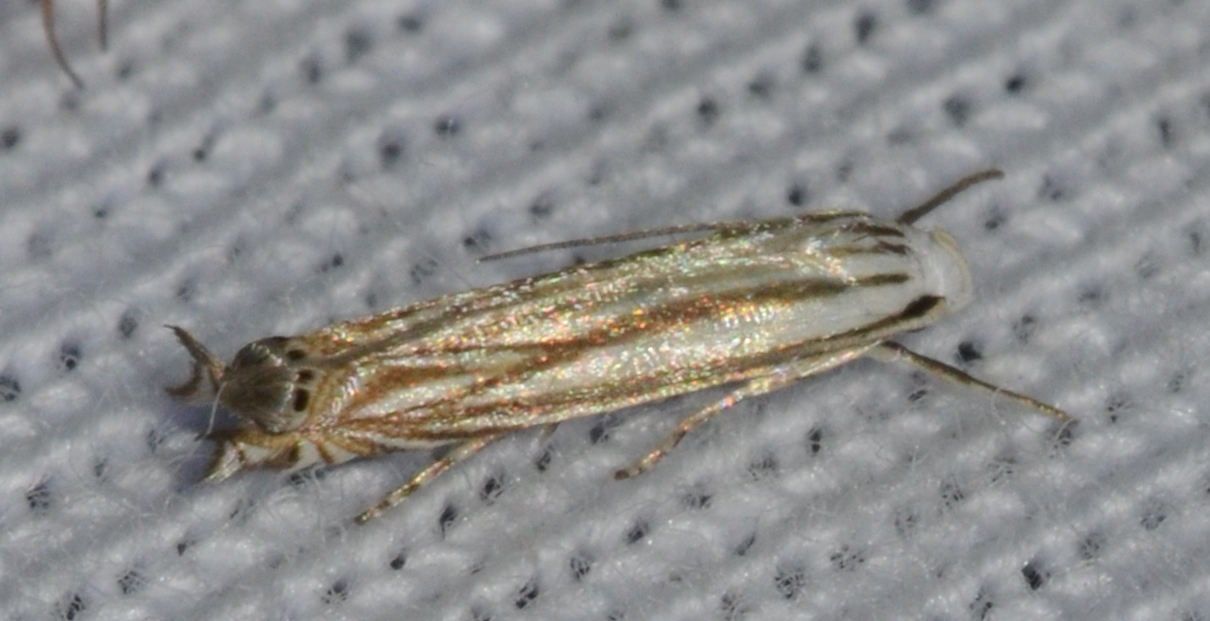

Scientific classification
- Kingdom: Animalia
- Phylum: Arthropoda
- Clade: Pancrustacea
- Class: Insecta
- Order: Lepidoptera
- Family: Gelechiidae
- Genus: Polyhymno
- Species: P. luteostrigella

Binomial name
- Polyhymno luteostrigella Chambers, 1874

Synonyms
- Polyhymno fuscostrigella Chambers, 1876

= Polyhymno luteostrigella =

Species of moth

Polyhymno luteostrigella, the polyhymno moth, is a moth of the family Gelechiidae. It is found in the United States, where it has been recorded from Texas to Florida, north to Connecticut and Kentucky. It is also found in Cuba and Puerto Rico.
