= Polyhymno tetragrapha =

Scientific classification
- Kingdom: Animalia
- Phylum: Arthropoda
- Class: Insecta
- Order: Lepidoptera
- Family: Gelechiidae
- Genus: Polyhymno
- Species: P. tetragrapha

Binomial name
- Polyhymno tetragrapha Meyrick, 1913

Species of moth

Polyhymno tetragrapha is a species of moth of the family Gelechiidae. It was described by Edward Meyrick in 1913. It is found in South Africa (Mpumalanga).

The wingspan is about 16 mm. The forewings are dark purplish-fuscous mixed with blackish and with a broad white median streak from the base, posteriorly attenuated to a point, not reaching the termen. There is some whitish suffusion towards the dorsum posteriorly and there is a fine white oblique streak from beneath the middle of the costa and a rather broad one from the submedian fold opposite meeting at an acute angle just beyond the apex of the median streak, the angle suffused with light brownish. There is an acutely angulated silvery transverse line beyond this, the lower half close before the termen, the terminal edge beyond this slenderly brownish preceded by a fine white line. There is a fine light ochreous-brown streak from three-fourths of the costa into the apical projection, above which are three wedge-shaped white marks from the costa. The hindwings are dark grey.
