= Polyhymno hieracitis =

Scientific classification
- Kingdom: Animalia
- Phylum: Arthropoda
- Class: Insecta
- Order: Lepidoptera
- Family: Gelechiidae
- Genus: Polyhymno
- Species: P. hieracitis

Binomial name
- Polyhymno hieracitis Meyrick, 1913

Species of moth

Polyhymno hieracitis is a species of moth of the family Gelechiidae. It was described by Edward Meyrick in 1913. It is found in South Africa (Mpumalanga).

The wingspan is 10–11 mm. The forewings are fuscous, suffused with dark fuscous in the disc and with a rather broad shining ochreous-white median longitudinal streak from the base to near the termen, the apex obtuse. Between this and the tornus is an indistinct short oblique whitish line, sometimes suffused into the streak. There is a whitish line along the costa from near the base to about the middle, then obliquely to above the extremity of the median streak. An acutely angulated bluish-leaden-metallic transverse line is found beyond the apex of the median streak, becoming white on the costa. The apical area beyond this is somewhat tinged with fulvous, marked on the costa with three short wedge-shaped white marks separated with blackish. The hindwings are grey.
