= Poliosia brunnea =

Scientific classification
- Domain: Eukaryota
- Kingdom: Animalia
- Phylum: Arthropoda
- Class: Insecta
- Order: Lepidoptera
- Superfamily: Noctuoidea
- Family: Erebidae
- Subfamily: Arctiinae
- Genus: Poliosia
- Species: P. brunnea

Binomial name
- Poliosia brunnea (Moore, 1878)

Synonyms
- Dolgoma brunnea Moore, 1878; Gampola normalis Hampson, 1896

Species of moth

Poliosia brunnea is a moth in the family Erebidae. It was described by Frederic Moore in 1878. It is found in the Indian states of Sikkim and Assam.
