= Charltona diatraeella =

Scientific classification
- Domain: Eukaryota
- Kingdom: Animalia
- Phylum: Arthropoda
- Class: Insecta
- Order: Lepidoptera
- Family: Crambidae
- Subfamily: Crambinae
- Tribe: incertae sedis
- Genus: Charltona
- Species: C. diatraeella

Binomial name
- Charltona diatraeella (Hampson, 1896)

Synonyms
- Platytes diatraeella Hampson, 1896

Species of moth

Charltona diatraeella is a moth in the family Crambidae. It was described by George Hampson in 1896. It is found in India.
