= Thyretes =

Scientific classification
- Domain: Eukaryota
- Kingdom: Animalia
- Phylum: Arthropoda
- Class: Insecta
- Order: Lepidoptera
- Superfamily: Noctuoidea
- Family: Erebidae
- Subfamily: Arctiinae
- Tribe: Syntomini
- Genus: Thyretes; Boisduval, 1847

Synonyms
- Eressades Bethune-Baker, 1911

Genus of moths

Thyretes is a genus of moths in the family Erebidae.

== Species ==
- Thyretes buettikeri Wiltshire, 1983
- Thyretes caffra Wallengren, 1863
- Thyretes cooremani Kiriakoff, 1953
- Thyretes hippotes Cramer, 1780
- Thyretes montana Boisduval, 1847
- Thyretes monteiroi Butler, 1876
- Thyretes negus Oberthür, 1878
- Thyretes signivenis Hering, 1937
- Thyretes trichaetiformis Zerny, 1912
- Thyretes ustjuzhanini Dubatolov, 2012
