= Poliosia cubitifera =

Scientific classification
- Kingdom: Animalia
- Phylum: Arthropoda
- Class: Insecta
- Order: Lepidoptera
- Superfamily: Noctuoidea
- Family: Erebidae
- Subfamily: Arctiinae
- Genus: Poliosia
- Species: P. cubitifera

Binomial name
- Poliosia cubitifera (Hampson, 1894)

Synonyms
- Lithosia cubitifera Hampson, 1894

Species of moth

Poliosia cubitifera is a moth in the family Erebidae. It was described by George Hampson in 1894. It is found in the Indian states of Sikkim and Assam.
