= Eccopsis trixiphias =

Scientific classification
- Kingdom: Animalia
- Phylum: Arthropoda
- Clade: Pancrustacea
- Class: Insecta
- Order: Lepidoptera
- Family: Tortricidae
- Genus: Eccopsis
- Species: E. trixiphias

Binomial name
- Eccopsis trixiphias (Meyrick, 1939)

Synonyms
- Argyroploce trixiphias Meyrick, 1939

Species of moth

Eccopsis trixiphias is a species of moth of the family Tortricidae. It is found in the Democratic Republic of Congo.
