= Polyhymno inermis =

Scientific classification
- Kingdom: Animalia
- Phylum: Arthropoda
- Class: Insecta
- Order: Lepidoptera
- Family: Gelechiidae
- Genus: Polyhymno
- Species: P. inermis

Binomial name
- Polyhymno inermis Meyrick, 1913

Species of moth

Polyhymno inermis is a moth of the family Gelechiidae. It was described by Edward Meyrick in 1913. It is found in Mpumalanga, South Africa.

The wingspan is about 8 mm. The forewings are ochreous brownish with a fine white oblique striga from the costa at two-thirds, the costal edge blackish on each side of this, its apex extended as a leaden-grey line to near the termen beneath the apex, then sharply angulated and continued near the termen to near the tornus. There are two wedge-shaped white marks from the costa towards the apex. The hindwings are grey.
