= Poliosia umbra =

Scientific classification
- Domain: Eukaryota
- Kingdom: Animalia
- Phylum: Arthropoda
- Class: Insecta
- Order: Lepidoptera
- Superfamily: Noctuoidea
- Family: Erebidae
- Subfamily: Arctiinae
- Genus: Poliosia
- Species: P. umbra

Binomial name
- Poliosia umbra Rothschild, 1915

Species of moth

Poliosia umbra is a moth in the family Erebidae. It was described by Walter Rothschild in 1915. It is found in New Guinea, where it is only known from the surroundings of the Utakwa River.
