= Poliosia =

Scientific classification
- Kingdom: Animalia
- Phylum: Arthropoda
- Class: Insecta
- Order: Lepidoptera
- Superfamily: Noctuoidea
- Family: Erebidae
- Subfamily: Arctiinae
- Subtribe: Lithosiina
- Genus: Poliosia; Hampson, 1900

Genus of moths

Poliosia is a genus of moths in the family Erebidae.

== Species ==
- Poliosia albida Hampson, 1914
- Poliosia bifida Holloway, 2001
- Poliosia binotata (Hampson, 1893)
- Poliosia brunnea (Moore, 1878)
- Poliosia concolora Holloway, 2001
- Poliosia cubitifera Hampson, 1894
- Poliosia binotata Hampson, 1893
- Poliosia brunnea Moore, 1878
- Poliosia fragilis Lucas, 1890
- Poliosia marginata Hampson, 1900
- Poliosia muricolor Walker, 1862
- Poliosia pulverea Hampson, 1900
- Poliosia pulverosa Kiriakoff, 1958
- Poliosia punctivena Hampson, 1898
- Poliosia quadrifida Holloway, 2001
- Poliosia rectilinea de Joannis, 1928
- Poliosia solovyevi Dubatolov & Bucsek, 2013
- Poliosia umbra Rothschild, 1915

== Former species ==
- Poliosia nigrifrons Hampson, 1900
