= Polyhymno conflicta =

Scientific classification
- Kingdom: Animalia
- Phylum: Arthropoda
- Class: Insecta
- Order: Lepidoptera
- Family: Gelechiidae
- Genus: Polyhymno
- Species: P. conflicta

Binomial name
- Polyhymno conflicta Meyrick, 1917

Species of moth

Polyhymno conflicta is a moth of the family Gelechiidae. It was described by Edward Meyrick in 1917. It is found in Peru.

The wingspan is 10–13 mm. The forewings are dark fuscous, with cloudy white or whitish markings, consisting of a subcostal line on the basal half, a supramedian line to five-sixths, where it meets an attenuated streak from beneath the middle of the disc, and a confused and irregular more or less confluent suffusion occupying most of dorsal area up to the fold. There is a very oblique white line from the middle of the costa to near the termen above the middle and a white oblique strigula from the costa at three-fourths, where a fine acutely angulated leaden-metallic line runs to the tornus. There are two white wedge-shaped marks from the costa beyond this. The apical area is tinged with ochreous. The hindwings are light slaty grey.
