= Thyretes signivenis =

Scientific classification
- Kingdom: Animalia
- Phylum: Arthropoda
- Class: Insecta
- Order: Lepidoptera
- Superfamily: Noctuoidea
- Family: Erebidae
- Subfamily: Arctiinae
- Genus: Thyretes
- Species: T. signivenis

Binomial name
- Thyretes signivenis Hering, 1937

Species of moth

Thyretes signivenis is a moth in the family Erebidae. It was described by Hering in 1937. It is found in the Democratic Republic of Congo.
