= Poliosia concolora =

Scientific classification
- Kingdom: Animalia
- Phylum: Arthropoda
- Clade: Pancrustacea
- Class: Insecta
- Order: Lepidoptera
- Superfamily: Noctuoidea
- Family: Erebidae
- Subfamily: Arctiinae
- Genus: Poliosia
- Species: P. concolora

Binomial name
- Poliosia concolora Holloway, 2001

Species of moth

Poliosia concolora is a moth in the family Erebidae. It was described by Jeremy Daniel Holloway in 2001. It is found on Borneo and in the north-eastern Himalayas. The habitat consists of lowland forests, including wet heath forests and disturbed coastal forests.

The length of the forewings is 10–11 mm.
