= Polyhymno gladiata =

Scientific classification
- Kingdom: Animalia
- Phylum: Arthropoda
- Class: Insecta
- Order: Lepidoptera
- Family: Gelechiidae
- Genus: Polyhymno
- Species: P. gladiata

Binomial name
- Polyhymno gladiata Meyrick, 1917

Species of moth

Polyhymno gladiata is a moth of the family Gelechiidae. It was described by Edward Meyrick in 1917. It is found in Colombia.

The wingspan is about 9 mm. The costal half of the forewings is dark fuscous, the dorsal area is silvery grey whitish, these separated by a broad median longitudinal shining white streak from the base to five-sixths, pointed posteriorly, the lower edge suffused. There is a very fine white line along the costa from near the base to the middle, then diverted as a slender very oblique streak to just above the apex of the median streak. There is an oblique white strigula from the costa about three-fourths, where a rather thick angulated leaden-metallic line runs to the tornus. Beyond this is a small white costal strigula, followed by a small white triangular spot. The apical and terminal areas round these markings are brownish ochreous. The hindwings are light grey.
