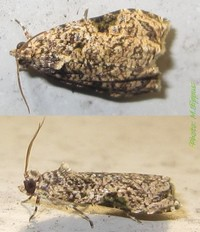

Scientific classification
- Kingdom: Animalia
- Phylum: Arthropoda
- Class: Insecta
- Order: Lepidoptera
- Family: Tortricidae
- Genus: Eccopsis
- Species: E. praecedens

Binomial name
- Eccopsis praecedens Walsingham, 1897

Synonyms
- Eccopsis chromatica Diakonoff, 1983; Cryptophlebia gaetani Guillermet, 2006

= Eccopsis praecedens =

Species of moth

Eccopsis praecedens is a moth of the family Tortricidae. It is found in western, central, eastern and southern Africa, including the islands of São Tomé, Cape Verde, Madagascar and Réunion.

Larvae of this species had been stated on Cassia fistula (Fabaceae).
