= Thyretes montana =

Scientific classification
- Domain: Eukaryota
- Kingdom: Animalia
- Phylum: Arthropoda
- Class: Insecta
- Order: Lepidoptera
- Superfamily: Noctuoidea
- Family: Erebidae
- Subfamily: Arctiinae
- Genus: Thyretes
- Species: T. montana

Binomial name
- Thyretes montana Boisduval, 1847

Species of moth

Thyretes montana is a moth in the family Erebidae. It was described by Jean Baptiste Boisduval in 1847. It is found in South Africa.
