= Oedaleosia frontalis =

Scientific classification
- Domain: Eukaryota
- Kingdom: Animalia
- Phylum: Arthropoda
- Class: Insecta
- Order: Lepidoptera
- Superfamily: Noctuoidea
- Family: Erebidae
- Subfamily: Arctiinae
- Genus: Oedaleosia
- Species: O. frontalis

Binomial name
- Oedaleosia frontalis Strand, 1909

Species of moth

Oedaleosia frontalis is a moth of the subfamily Arctiinae. It was described by Strand in 1909. It is found in eastern Africa.
