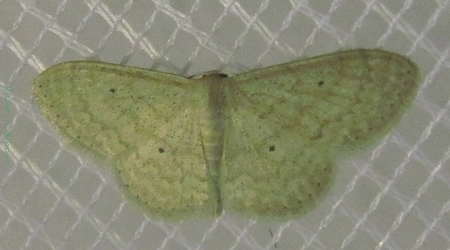

Scientific classification
- Domain: Eukaryota
- Kingdom: Animalia
- Phylum: Arthropoda
- Class: Insecta
- Order: Lepidoptera
- Family: Geometridae
- Genus: Scopula
- Species: S. minorata

Binomial name
- Scopula minorata (Boisduval, 1833)

Synonyms
- Geometra minorata Boisduval, 1833; Scopula conscutanea (Walker, 1863); Acidalia consentanea Walker, 1861; Acidalia holobapharia Mabille, 1900; Acidalia luculata Guenée, 1858; Acidalia mauritiata Guenée, 1858; Emmiltis (Craspedia) mombasae Warren, 1904; Scopula inustaria (Herrich-Schäffer, 1847); Scopula colonaria (Herrich-Schäffer, 1852); Scopula accessaria (Herrich-Schäffer, 1852); Ptychopoda medioumbrata (Turati, 1930); Idaea medioumbraria; Scopula medioumbraria; Scopula ochroleucata Herrich-Schäffer, 1844; Acidalia ochroleucaria Herrich-Schäffer, 1844; Scopula inustata Herrich-Schäffer, 1844

= Scopula minorata =

Species of geometer moth in subfamily Sterrhinae

Scopula minorata is a moth of the family Geometridae. It was described by Jean Baptiste Boisduval in 1833. It is found in Africa south of the Sahara, the Arabian Peninsula and on the islands of the Indian Ocean. Furthermore, it is found in southern Europe. It can be distinguished from Scopula lactaria only by examination of its genitalia.

The wingspan is 15–20 millimetres (0.59–0.79 in).

== Subspecies ==
- Scopula minorata minorata
- Scopula minorata corcularia (Rebel, 1894)
- Scopula minorata ochroleucaria (Herrich-Schäffer, 1847)
- Scopula minorata tripolitana (Sterneck, 1933)
