= Polyhymno oxystola =

Scientific classification
- Kingdom: Animalia
- Phylum: Arthropoda
- Class: Insecta
- Order: Lepidoptera
- Family: Gelechiidae
- Genus: Polyhymno
- Species: P. oxystola

Binomial name
- Polyhymno oxystola Meyrick, 1913

Species of moth

Polyhymno oxystola is a moth of the family Gelechiidae. It was described by Edward Meyrick in 1913. It is found in Mpumalanga, South Africa.

The wingspan is 11–12 mm. The forewings are rather dark fuscous, the dorsal area lighter. There is a rather broad shining white median longitudinal streak from the base to near the termen, posteriorly acutely pointed, edged beneath by a streak of dark fuscous suffusion. There is a white line along the costa from near the base to near the middle, then running obliquely into the apex of the median streak. A suffused white streak is found beneath the submedian dark fuscous streak from before the middle of the wing to its extremity, sending a suffused oblique branch to the tornus. There is a silvery-metallic acutely angulated transverse line beyond the apex of the median streak, becoming white towards the costa, the lower portion almost terminal. A pale brownish-ochreous slender streak runs above the angle of this from near the costa into the apex and there are two oblique white wedge-shaped marks running from the costa into this, the second followed by a blackish dot very finely edged posteriorly with whitish. The hindwings are grey.
