= Polyhymno charigramma =

Scientific classification
- Kingdom: Animalia
- Phylum: Arthropoda
- Class: Insecta
- Order: Lepidoptera
- Family: Gelechiidae
- Genus: Polyhymno
- Species: P. charigramma

Binomial name
- Polyhymno charigramma Meyrick, 1929

Species of moth

Polyhymno charigramma is a moth of the family Gelechiidae. It was described by Edward Meyrick in 1929. It is found in Amazonas, Brazil.

The wingspan is about 12 mm.
