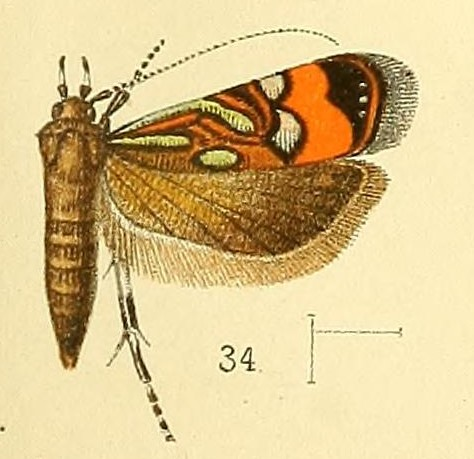
- Tricyanaula metallica

Scientific classification
- Domain: Eukaryota
- Kingdom: Animalia
- Phylum: Arthropoda
- Class: Insecta
- Order: Lepidoptera
- Family: Gelechiidae
- Tribe: Anacampsini
- Genus: Tricyanaula; Meyrick, 1925

Type species
- *Tricyanaula aurantiaca Walsingham, 1887

= Tricyanaula =

Genus of moths

Tricyanaula is a genus of moth in the family Gelechiidae.

== Species ==
The species of this genus are:

- Tricyanaula aurantiaca (Walsingham, 1887) (from Sri Lanka)
- Tricyanaula metallica (Walsingham, 1891) (from South Africa and the Gambia)

== Former species ==
- Tricyanaula amethystias (Meyrick 1906)
- Tricyanaula anthistis Meyrick 1929
- Tricyanaula augusta (Meyrick 1911)
- Tricyanaula cyanozona (Meyrick 1923)
- Tricyanaula perelegans Omelko &Omelko, 1993
- Tricyanaula hoplocrates Meyrick, 1932
