= Thyretes trichaetiformis =

Scientific classification
- Kingdom: Animalia
- Phylum: Arthropoda
- Class: Insecta
- Order: Lepidoptera
- Superfamily: Noctuoidea
- Family: Erebidae
- Subfamily: Arctiinae
- Genus: Thyretes
- Species: T. trichaetiformis

Binomial name
- Thyretes trichaetiformis Zerny, 1912

Species of moth

Thyretes trichaetiformis is a moth in the family Erebidae. It was described by Zerny in 1912. It is found in Tanzania.
