= Charltona bivitellus =

Scientific classification
- Domain: Eukaryota
- Kingdom: Animalia
- Phylum: Arthropoda
- Class: Insecta
- Order: Lepidoptera
- Family: Crambidae
- Subfamily: Crambinae
- Tribe: incertae sedis
- Genus: Charltona
- Species: C. bivitellus

Binomial name
- Charltona bivitellus (Moore, 1872)

Synonyms
- Chilo bivitellus Moore, 1872

Species of moth

Charltona bivitellus is a moth in the family Crambidae. It was described by Frederic Moore in 1872. It is found in India.
