= Negera =

Scientific classification
- Domain: Eukaryota
- Kingdom: Animalia
- Phylum: Arthropoda
- Class: Insecta
- Order: Lepidoptera
- Family: Drepanidae
- Subfamily: Drepaninae
- Genus: Negera; Walker, 1855

Synonyms
- Ancistrina Gaede, 1927; Ctenogyna Felder, 1874; Ctenogyne Gaede, 1931; Pithania Bryk, 1913

Moth genus in family Drepanidae

Negera is a genus of moths belonging to the subfamily Drepaninae.

== Species ==
- Negera bimaculata (Holland, 1893)
- Negera clenchi Watson, 1965
- Negera confusa Walker, 1855
- Negera disspinosa Watson, 1965
- Negera natalensis (Felder, 1874)
- Negera quadricornis Watson, 1965
- Negera ramosa Watson, 1965
- Negera unispinosa Watson, 1965
