= Tantaliana signifera =

Scientific classification
- Kingdom: Animalia
- Phylum: Arthropoda
- Class: Insecta
- Order: Lepidoptera
- Family: Eupterotidae
- Genus: Tantaliana
- Species: T. signifera

Binomial name
- Tantaliana signifera (Walker, 1855)

Synonyms
- Jana signifera Walker, 1855

Species of moth

Tantaliana signifera is a moth in the family Eupterotidae. It was described by Francis Walker in 1855. It is found in Sierra Leone.
