= Polyhymno eurydoxa =

Scientific classification
- Kingdom: Animalia
- Phylum: Arthropoda
- Class: Insecta
- Order: Lepidoptera
- Family: Gelechiidae
- Genus: Polyhymno
- Species: P. eurydoxa

Binomial name
- Polyhymno eurydoxa Meyrick, 1909

Species of moth

Polyhymno eurydoxa is a moth of the family Gelechiidae. It was described by Edward Meyrick in 1909. It is found in Namibia, South Africa (Limpopo, Mpumalanga, Gauteng, Free State) and Zimbabwe.

The wingspan is about 13 mm. The forewings are dark fuscous with a broad shining white stripe covering the median third from the base to near the termen, sharply defined above, beneath suffused into a pale yellow-brownish stripe which covers the dorsal third along the extreme edge. There is a fine suffused whitish-ochreous streak along the costa from one-fourth to two-thirds, sending a branch from the middle to above the apex of the median stripe. There is an oblique dark fuscous line splitting the apex of the median stripe and there are five white wedge-shaped marks on the posterior third of the costa, partly in the cilia, the first two more oblique and slender, the first terminating in a short fine metallic mark. The apical area beneath these is suffused with ferruginous yellowish, which extends also along the terminal area, except a leaden-metallic terminal streak. The hindwings are grey.
