= Polyhymno pausimacha =

Scientific classification
- Kingdom: Animalia
- Phylum: Arthropoda
- Class: Insecta
- Order: Lepidoptera
- Family: Gelechiidae
- Genus: Polyhymno
- Species: P. pausimacha

Binomial name
- Polyhymno pausimacha Meyrick, 1909

Species of moth

Polyhymno pausimacha is a moth of the family Gelechiidae. It was described by Edward Meyrick in 1909. It is found in Namibia and South Africa (Mpumalanga, Gauteng, the Northern Cape, the Eastern Cape).

The wingspan is about 15 mm. The forewings are dark purplish fuscous mixed with blackish and with a rather broad white median streak from the base, broadly interrupted about the middle, the posterior extremity attenuated, not reaching the termen. Beneath the posterior segment is a cloudy white streak on the fold to the tornus, and an irregular cloudy white streak between these mixed with fuscous in the middle and extending upwards to beyond the apex of the median streak. A slender white oblique streak is found above the apex of the median and there is a silvery-metallic acutely angulated line from three-fourths of the costa to the tornus, passing round these. A brownish-ochreous streak runs from near the costa immediately beyond this to the apex and there are three white oblique wedge-shaped marks on the costa towards the apex, as well as a whitish terminal line not reaching the apex or tornus. The hindwings are grey, darker posteriorly.
