= Polyhymno intorta =

Scientific classification
- Domain: Eukaryota
- Kingdom: Animalia
- Phylum: Arthropoda
- Class: Insecta
- Order: Lepidoptera
- Family: Gelechiidae
- Genus: Polyhymno
- Species: P. intorta

Binomial name
- Polyhymno intorta Meyrick, 1918

Species of moth

Polyhymno intorta is a moth of the family Gelechiidae. It was described by Edward Meyrick in 1918. It is found in KwaZulu-Natal, South Africa.

The wingspan is about 6 mm. The forewings are blackish with two closely parallel whitish median lines from the base, the upper not reaching the middle, the lower continued along the fold to the tornus. There is a whitish dorsal line from the base to the tornus and a very oblique whitish streak from two-fifths of the costa and a very oblique whitish line from one-third of the dorsum, meeting at an acute angle in the disc and produced to near the termen, then shortly acute angled back parallel to the termen. A fine double dark fuscous line suffused with fulvous is found from three-fourths of the costa into the apex, then along the termen to the tornus, on the costal portion margined on each side by fine whitish lines. The hindwings are violet grey.
