= Polyhymno millotiella =

Scientific classification
- Kingdom: Animalia
- Phylum: Arthropoda
- Class: Insecta
- Order: Lepidoptera
- Family: Gelechiidae
- Genus: Polyhymno
- Species: P. millotiella

Binomial name
- Polyhymno millotiella Viette, 1954

Species of moth

Polyhymno millotiella is a moth of the family Gelechiidae. It was described by Viette in 1954. It is found in Madagascar.
