= Polyhymno paracma =

Scientific classification
- Domain: Eukaryota
- Kingdom: Animalia
- Phylum: Arthropoda
- Class: Insecta
- Order: Lepidoptera
- Family: Gelechiidae
- Genus: Polyhymno
- Species: P. paracma

Binomial name
- Polyhymno paracma Meyrick, 1909

Species of moth

Polyhymno paracma is a moth of the family Gelechiidae. It was described by Edward Meyrick in 1909. It is found in Mozambique, Namibia, South Africa (Gauteng, Mpumalanga, Limpopo) and Zimbabwe.

The wingspan is 13–14 mm. The forewings are ochreous fuscous with a broad shining white sharply defined median streak from the base to beyond five-sixths, the apex acute, the lower margin prominent beyond the middle of the wing and sending a fine branch along the fold almost to the tornus. There is a narrow shining, white subdorsal streak from the base to the tornus and a whitish line along the costa from about one-fourth to the middle, then obliquely to above the apex of the median streak. An oblique white striga is found from the costa at about three-fourths to near the termen, the apex leaden grey. There is also a suffused leaden-grey mark along the upper part of the termen. The hindwings are grey.
