= Polyhymno abaiella =

Scientific classification
- Domain: Eukaryota
- Kingdom: Animalia
- Phylum: Arthropoda
- Class: Insecta
- Order: Lepidoptera
- Family: Gelechiidae
- Genus: Polyhymno
- Species: P. abaiella

Binomial name
- Polyhymno abaiella Amsel, 1974

Species of moth

Polyhymno abaiella is a moth of the family Gelechiidae. It was described by Hans Georg Amsel in 1974 and is found in southern Iran.
