= Charltona ariadna =

Scientific classification
- Domain: Eukaryota
- Kingdom: Animalia
- Phylum: Arthropoda
- Class: Insecta
- Order: Lepidoptera
- Family: Crambidae
- Subfamily: Crambinae
- Tribe: incertae sedis
- Genus: Charltona
- Species: C. ariadna

Binomial name
- Charltona ariadna Błeszyński, 1970

Species of moth

Charltona ariadna is a moth in the family Crambidae. It was described by Stanisław Błeszyński in 1970. It is found in Antananarivo, Madagascar.

The forewings of this species are 16–20 mm. Its ground colour is brownish with a light basal striped diffusing in the middle of the wing.

== See also ==
- List of moths of Madagascar
