= Negera disspinosa =

Scientific classification
- Domain: Eukaryota
- Kingdom: Animalia
- Phylum: Arthropoda
- Class: Insecta
- Order: Lepidoptera
- Family: Drepanidae
- Genus: Negera
- Species: N. disspinosa

Binomial name
- Negera disspinosa Watson, 1965

Species of hook-tip moth

Negera disspinosa is a moth in the family Drepanidae. It was described by Watson in 1965. It is found in Gabon, Ghana and Nigeria.

The length of the forewings is 20.5-22.5 mm.
