= Thyretes cooremani =

Scientific classification
- Domain: Eukaryota
- Kingdom: Animalia
- Phylum: Arthropoda
- Class: Insecta
- Order: Lepidoptera
- Superfamily: Noctuoidea
- Family: Erebidae
- Subfamily: Arctiinae
- Genus: Thyretes
- Species: T. cooremani

Binomial name
- Thyretes cooremani Kiriakoff, 1953

Species of moth

Thyretes cooremani is a moth in the family Erebidae. It was described by Sergius G. Kiriakoff in 1953. It is found in the Democratic Republic of the Congo.
