= Tantaliana nigristriata =

Scientific classification
- Kingdom: Animalia
- Phylum: Arthropoda
- Class: Insecta
- Order: Lepidoptera
- Family: Eupterotidae
- Genus: Tantaliana
- Species: T. nigristriata

Binomial name
- Tantaliana nigristriata (Janse, 1915)

Synonyms
- Jana nigristriata Janse, 1915

Species of moth

Tantaliana nigristriata is a moth in the family Eupterotidae. It was described by Anthonie Johannes Theodorus Janse in 1915. It is found in South Africa, where it has been recorded from Mpumalanga and KwaZulu-Natal.

The wingspan is about 102 mm. The forewings are light pinkish cinnamon, broadly suffused, especially on the basal and the costal area, with glossy fuscous black. The reniform is distinct, in- and out-wardly confined by a sub-triangular black suffusion. The medial line is fuscous, curved outwards from the costa to vein seven, then straight to vein two, then slightly bent inwards to vein one, then indistinct to the inner margin. The postmedial line is double, fuscous and nearly straight, waved inwards on veins one to nine. The sub-terminal line is less defined and of the ground colour, waved inwards on the veins, curved from the costa to vein five, then nearly straight to the tornus. The space between the postmedial and sub-terminal lines and also beyond the sub-terminal line thickly suffused with fuscous. The hindwings are light pinkish cinnamon with the medial line very indistinct and the subterminal line broad, fuscous and slightly dentate on the inner side, more dentate inwards on the outer side at all the veins. The terminal line is broad, fuscous, slightly dentate outwards on the veins.
