= Charltona tritonella =

Scientific classification
- Domain: Eukaryota
- Kingdom: Animalia
- Phylum: Arthropoda
- Class: Insecta
- Order: Lepidoptera
- Family: Crambidae
- Subfamily: Crambinae
- Tribe: incertae sedis
- Genus: Charltona
- Species: C. tritonella

Binomial name
- Charltona tritonella (Hampson, 1898)

Synonyms
- Platytes tritonella Hampson, 1898

Species of moth

Charltona tritonella is a moth in the family Crambidae. It was described by George Hampson in 1898. It is found in South Africa, where it has been recorded from KwaZulu-Natal and Mpumalanga.
