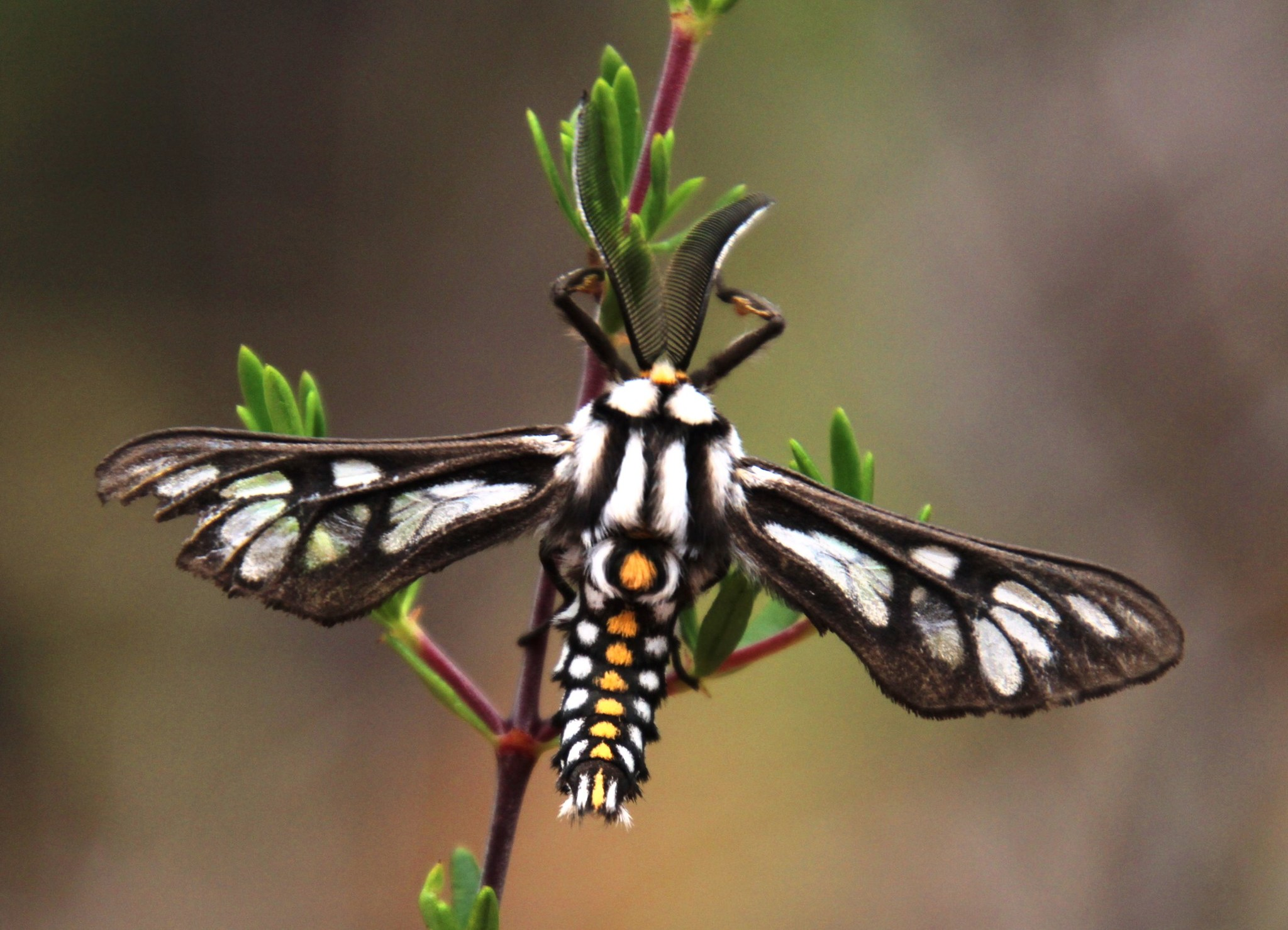

Scientific classification
- Domain: Eukaryota
- Kingdom: Animalia
- Phylum: Arthropoda
- Class: Insecta
- Order: Lepidoptera
- Superfamily: Noctuoidea
- Family: Erebidae
- Subfamily: Arctiinae
- Genus: Thyretes
- Species: T. hippotes

Binomial name
- Thyretes hippotes (Cramer, 1780)

Synonyms
- Sphinx hippotes Cramer, 1780

= Thyretes hippotes =

Species of moth

Thyretes hippotes is a moth in the family Erebidae. It was described by Pieter Cramer in 1780. It is found in South Africa.

The larvae feed on Pentzia incana.
