= Poliosia solovyevi =

Scientific classification
- Kingdom: Animalia
- Phylum: Arthropoda
- Clade: Pancrustacea
- Class: Insecta
- Order: Lepidoptera
- Superfamily: Noctuoidea
- Family: Erebidae
- Subfamily: Arctiinae
- Genus: Poliosia
- Species: P. solovyevi

Binomial name
- Poliosia solovyevi Dubatolov & Bucsek, 2013

Species of moth

Poliosia solovyevi is a moth in the family Erebidae. It was described by Vladimir Viktorovitch Dubatolov and Karol Bucsek in 2013. It is found in Vietnam.
