= Poliosia pulverea =

Scientific classification
- Kingdom: Animalia
- Phylum: Arthropoda
- Class: Insecta
- Order: Lepidoptera
- Superfamily: Noctuoidea
- Family: Erebidae
- Subfamily: Arctiinae
- Genus: Poliosia
- Species: P. pulverea

Binomial name
- Poliosia pulverea Hampson, 1900

Species of moth

Poliosia pulverea is a moth in the family Erebidae. It was described by George Hampson in 1900. It is found on Borneo. The habitat consists of forests on limestone.
