= Poliosia marginata =

Scientific classification
- Kingdom: Animalia
- Phylum: Arthropoda
- Class: Insecta
- Order: Lepidoptera
- Superfamily: Noctuoidea
- Family: Erebidae
- Subfamily: Arctiinae
- Genus: Poliosia
- Species: P. marginata

Binomial name
- Poliosia marginata Hampson, 1900

Synonyms
- Lithosia marginata Hampson, 1900; Poliosia ampla van Eecke, 1920

Species of moth

Poliosia marginata is a moth in the family Erebidae. It was described by George Hampson in 1900. It is found on Borneo and Java. The habitat consists of lowland dipterocarp forests.

Adults are pale straw coloured, the hindwings with a slightly darker border.
