= Charltona kala =

Scientific classification
- Domain: Eukaryota
- Kingdom: Animalia
- Phylum: Arthropoda
- Class: Insecta
- Order: Lepidoptera
- Family: Crambidae
- Subfamily: Crambinae
- Tribe: incertae sedis
- Genus: Charltona
- Species: C. kala

Binomial name
- Charltona kala C. Swinhoe, 1886

Species of moth

Charltona kala is a moth in the family Crambidae. It was described by Charles Swinhoe in 1886. It is found in India and Sri Lanka.

== Description ==
The wingspan is about 30 mm in the male and 40 mm in the female. Antennae of male bipectinate, with short branches dilated at extremity. Head, thorax and forewings uniform blackish brown. The last with diffused long black scales with pale bases in interspaces of inner and outer areas. Abdomen and hindwings pale fuscous.
