= Tantaliana =

Scientific classification
- Kingdom: Animalia
- Phylum: Arthropoda
- Class: Insecta
- Order: Lepidoptera
- Family: Eupterotidae
- Subfamily: Janinae
- Genus: Tantaliana; Bouyer, 2011

Genus of moths

Tantaliana is a genus of moths in the family Eupterotidae.

== Species ==
- Tantaliana crepax (Wallengren, 1860)
- Tantaliana nigristriata (Janse, 1915)
- Tantaliana signifera (Walker, 1855)
- Tantaliana tantalus (Herrich-Schäffer, 1854)
