= Polyhymno alcimacha =

Scientific classification
- Domain: Eukaryota
- Kingdom: Animalia
- Phylum: Arthropoda
- Class: Insecta
- Order: Lepidoptera
- Family: Gelechiidae
- Genus: Polyhymno
- Species: P. alcimacha

Binomial name
- Polyhymno alcimacha Meyrick, 1918

Species of moth

Polyhymno alcimacha is a moth of the family Gelechiidae. It was described by Edward Meyrick in 1918. It is found in India, where it has been recorded from Coimbatore in the south and Assam.

The wingspan is 11–12 mm. The forewings are dark bronzy fuscous with a strong ochreous-white median streak from the base to five-sixths, attenuated to a point posteriorly and with an ochreous-white line along the costa from towards the base to before the middle, then very obliquely to beyond the apex of the median streak, where it is very acutely angulated inwards and joins an ochreous-white line running along the fold from before the middle of the wing to the tornus. The apex and termen are occupied by pale ochreous suffusion and there is an angulated leaden-metallic line from a white mark on costa at three-fourths, the lower half running along the termen. Beyond this is a white spot mostly in the cilia, preceded and followed by minute indistinct whitish strigulae. The hindwings are grey.
