= Polyhymno furcatella =

Scientific classification
- Kingdom: Animalia
- Phylum: Arthropoda
- Clade: Pancrustacea
- Class: Insecta
- Order: Lepidoptera
- Family: Gelechiidae
- Genus: Polyhymno
- Species: P. furcatella

Binomial name
- Polyhymno furcatella Janse, 1950

Species of moth

Polyhymno furcatella is a moth of the family Gelechiidae. It was described by Anthonie Johannes Theodorus Janse in 1950. It is found in South Africa (Limpopo, North-West province).
