= Polyhymno subaequalis =

Scientific classification
- Domain: Eukaryota
- Kingdom: Animalia
- Phylum: Arthropoda
- Class: Insecta
- Order: Lepidoptera
- Family: Gelechiidae
- Genus: Polyhymno
- Species: P. subaequalis

Binomial name
- Polyhymno subaequalis Walsingham 1911

Species of moth

Polyhymno subaequalis is a moth of the family Gelechiidae. It was described by Thomas de Grey, 6th Baron Walsingham, in 1911. It is found in Mexico (Guerrero).

The wingspan is about 16 mm. The forewings are shining bronzy brown, with a broad white median streak from the base, attenuated to a point beyond the end of the cell where it nearly coalesces with a small elongate white spot beneath its apex, which is succeeded by a white triangular patch before the termen. The lower angle of this is produced in a narrow marginal line along the base of the dorsal cilia, its upper angle also produced towards the apex, but shortly meeting, at an acute angle, two white costal lines, the one starting nearly from the base and leaving the costa beyond the middle, the other coming from the costa a little beyond it, and only slightly less oblique; at the angle where they meet are some silvery scales. Above the acute angle which they form are three, white, wedge-shaped costal streaks, each wider than the other as they approach the apex, the third, pointing inward through the apical cilia, separated from the second by a blackish streak and ornamented at its outer end by two minute black dashes in the extremity of the apical cilia, which have thus a caudate appearance. The hindwings are greyish brown.
