= Poliosia rectilinea =

Scientific classification
- Domain: Eukaryota
- Kingdom: Animalia
- Phylum: Arthropoda
- Class: Insecta
- Order: Lepidoptera
- Superfamily: Noctuoidea
- Family: Erebidae
- Subfamily: Arctiinae
- Genus: Poliosia
- Species: P. rectilinea

Binomial name
- Poliosia rectilinea de Joannis, 1928

Species of moth

Poliosia rectilinea is a moth in the family Erebidae. It was described by Joseph de Joannis in 1928. It is found in Vietnam.
