= Polyhymno acaciella =

Scientific classification
- Domain: Eukaryota
- Kingdom: Animalia
- Phylum: Arthropoda
- Class: Insecta
- Order: Lepidoptera
- Family: Gelechiidae
- Genus: Polyhymno
- Species: P. acaciella

Binomial name
- Polyhymno acaciella Busck, 1900

Species of moth

Polyhymno acaciella is a moth of the family Gelechiidae. It was described by August Busck in 1900. It is found in North America, where it has been recorded from Oklahoma, Texas, Arizona and California.

The wingspan is 12.5–14 mm (0.49–0.55 in). The forewings are dark mouse brown, with in the middle of the wing from the base to beyond end of cell a broad spindle-shaped longitudinal white band. Between this and the dorsal edge is a short white longitudinal streak beginning about the middle of the wing and becoming narrower and fainter outwards, losing itself in the dorsal cilia. At the end of the central white band are three white streaks, one below and two above, converging towards a common point just before the apex, in the costal cilia are three short nearly perpendicular streaks converging towards the same point, which is of a somewhat lighter yellowish gray color, than the rest of the wing. The hindwings are dark gray.

The larvae feed on Acacia farnesiana. They are very dark, nearly black, with a black head.
