= Oedaleosia =

Scientific classification
- Kingdom: Animalia
- Phylum: Arthropoda
- Class: Insecta
- Order: Lepidoptera
- Superfamily: Noctuoidea
- Family: Erebidae
- Subfamily: Arctiinae
- Tribe: Lithosiini
- Genus: Oedaleosia; Hampson, 1900

Genus of moths

Oedaleosia is a genus of moths in the subfamily Arctiinae.

== Species ==
- Oedaleosia concolor Strand, 1912
- Oedaleosia frontalis Strand, 1909
- Oedaleosia nigricosta Hampson, 1900
