= Negera clenchi =

Scientific classification
- Kingdom: Animalia
- Phylum: Arthropoda
- Class: Insecta
- Order: Lepidoptera
- Family: Drepanidae
- Genus: Negera
- Species: N. clenchi

Binomial name
- Negera clenchi Watson, 1965

Species of hook-tip moth

Negera clenchi is a moth in the family Drepanidae. It was described by Watson in 1965. It is found in Cameroon.

The length of the forewings is about 23 mm.
