= Polyhymno deuteraula =

Scientific classification
- Domain: Eukaryota
- Kingdom: Animalia
- Phylum: Arthropoda
- Class: Insecta
- Order: Lepidoptera
- Family: Gelechiidae
- Genus: Polyhymno
- Species: P. deuteraula

Binomial name
- Polyhymno deuteraula Meyrick, 1914

Species of insect

Polyhymno deuteraula is a moth of the family Gelechiidae. It was described by Edward Meyrick in 1914. It is found in Mozambique, Namibia and South Africa (Gauteng, Limpopo).

The wingspan is about 9 mm. The forewings are rather dark bronzy ochreous fuscous with a moderate shining white median streak from the base to four-fifths, the lower edge straight to nearly two-thirds, then sinuate to the pointed apex. There is a white line almost from the base along the costa to the middle, then very obliquely to just beyond the apex of the median streak. A rather narrow white subdorsal streak is found from the base to just beyond the apex of the median streak, cut by a fine very oblique fuscous line on the tornus, and its posterior edge irregular above this. There is also a light ochreous-yellow apical patch connecting the costal line and the subdorsal streak. A white oblique strigula is found from the costa just before three-fourths, where an angulated fine silvery-metallic line runs to the termen above the tornus. The hindwings are pale grey, towards the base whitish tinged.
