= Charltona albidalis =

Scientific classification
- Domain: Eukaryota
- Kingdom: Animalia
- Phylum: Arthropoda
- Class: Insecta
- Order: Lepidoptera
- Family: Crambidae
- Subfamily: Crambinae
- Tribe: incertae sedis
- Genus: Charltona
- Species: C. albidalis

Binomial name
- Charltona albidalis Hampson, 1919

Species of moth

Charltona albidalis is a moth in the family Crambidae. It was described by George Hampson in 1919. It is found in Sierra Leone and South Sudan.
