= Polyhymno centrophora =

Scientific classification
- Kingdom: Animalia
- Phylum: Arthropoda
- Class: Insecta
- Order: Lepidoptera
- Family: Gelechiidae
- Genus: Polyhymno
- Species: P. centrophora

Binomial name
- Polyhymno centrophora (Meyrick, 1921)

Synonyms
- Plectrocosma centrophora Meyrick, 1921

Species of moth

Polyhymno centrophora is a moth of the family Gelechiidae. It was described by Edward Meyrick in 1921. It is found in Namibia and Gauteng, South Africa.

The wingspan is about 10 mm. The forewings are shining white with a narrow blackish streak along the costa from the base to the middle and an irregular dark violet-grey streak along the termen, the lower portion dilated and margined anteriorly by a leaden-metallic black-edged mark. The hindwings are whitish grey, more whitish towards the base.
