= Oedaleosia concolor =

Scientific classification
- Domain: Eukaryota
- Kingdom: Animalia
- Phylum: Arthropoda
- Class: Insecta
- Order: Lepidoptera
- Superfamily: Noctuoidea
- Family: Erebidae
- Subfamily: Arctiinae
- Genus: Oedaleosia
- Species: O. concolor

Binomial name
- Oedaleosia concolor Strand, 1912

Species of moth

Oedaleosia concolor is a moth of the subfamily Arctiinae. It was described by Strand in 1912. It is found in Sudan.
