= Negera quadricornis =

Scientific classification
- Domain: Eukaryota
- Kingdom: Animalia
- Phylum: Arthropoda
- Class: Insecta
- Order: Lepidoptera
- Family: Drepanidae
- Genus: Negera
- Species: N. quadricornis

Binomial name
- Negera quadricornis Watson, 1965

Species of hook-tip moth

Negera quadricornis is a moth in the family Drepanidae. It was described by Watson in 1965. It is found in the Democratic Republic of Congo (North Kivu) and Uganda.
