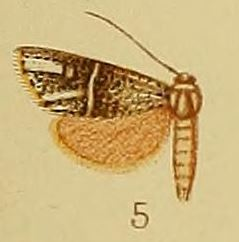

Scientific classification
- Domain: Eukaryota
- Kingdom: Animalia
- Phylum: Arthropoda
- Class: Insecta
- Order: Lepidoptera
- Family: Crambidae
- Subfamily: Crambinae
- Tribe: incertae sedis
- Genus: Charltona
- Species: C. chrysopasta

Binomial name
- Charltona chrysopasta Hampson, 1910

= Charltona chrysopasta =

Species of moth

Charltona chrysopasta is a moth in the family Crambidae. It was described by George Hampson in 1910. It is found in Zambia.
