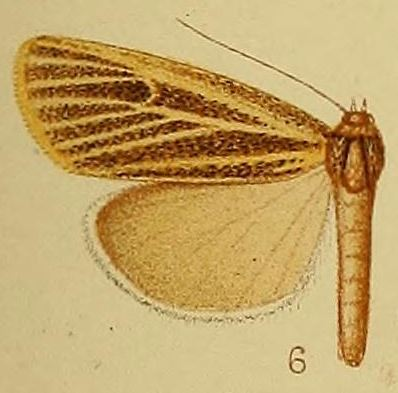

Scientific classification
- Kingdom: Animalia
- Phylum: Arthropoda
- Clade: Pancrustacea
- Class: Insecta
- Order: Lepidoptera
- Family: Crambidae
- Subfamily: Crambinae
- Tribe: incertae sedis
- Genus: Charltona
- Species: C. plurivittalis

Binomial name
- Charltona plurivittalis Hampson, 1910

Synonyms
- Charltona liopsamma Meyrick, 1933

= Charltona plurivittalis =

Species of moth

Charltona plurivittalis is a moth in the family Crambidae. It was described by George Hampson in 1910. It is found in the Democratic Republic of the Congo and Zimbabwe.
