= Polyhymno tropaea =

Scientific classification
- Kingdom: Animalia
- Phylum: Arthropoda
- Class: Insecta
- Order: Lepidoptera
- Family: Gelechiidae
- Genus: Polyhymno
- Species: P. tropaea

Binomial name
- Polyhymno tropaea Meyrick, 1908

Species of moth

Polyhymno tropaea is a moth of the family Gelechiidae. It was described by Edward Meyrick in 1908. It is found in Namibia and the South African provinces of Limpopo, Gauteng and North-West.

The wingspan is about 8 mm. The forewings are bronzy fuscous irrorated (sprinkled) with dark fuscous and with white markings. There is a median longitudinal streak from the base to the middle, then bent to meet at a very acute angle a narrow very oblique streak from the middle of the costa, the bent portion closely followed by a similar parallel streak meeting the same costal streak produced. There are two shorter less oblique costal streaks posteriorly, the second mostly in the cilia and edged with blackish. There is a narrow irregular streak along the posterior part of the fold and a narrow almost marginal streak along the lower half of the termen, extended round the tornus. The hindwings are grey.
