= Poliosia muricolor =

Scientific classification
- Kingdom: Animalia
- Phylum: Arthropoda
- Class: Insecta
- Order: Lepidoptera
- Superfamily: Noctuoidea
- Family: Erebidae
- Subfamily: Arctiinae
- Genus: Poliosia
- Species: P. muricolor

Binomial name
- Poliosia muricolor (Walker, 1862)

Synonyms
- Lithosia muricolor Walker, 1862

Species of moth

Poliosia muricolor is a moth in the family Erebidae. It was described by Francis Walker in 1862. It is found on Borneo and in Singapore and India (Sikkim, Assam). The habitat consists of lowland forests.

== Subspecies ==
- Poliosia muricolor muricolor
- Poliosia muricolor parva Moore, 1878 (Sikkim, Assam)

== Bibliography ==
- Pitkin, Brian & Jenkins, Paul. "Search results Family: Arctiidae". Butterflies and Moths of the World. Natural History Museum, London.
