= Polyhymno hostilis =

Scientific classification
- Kingdom: Animalia
- Phylum: Arthropoda
- Class: Insecta
- Order: Lepidoptera
- Family: Gelechiidae
- Genus: Polyhymno
- Species: P. hostilis

Binomial name
- Polyhymno hostilis Meyrick, 1918

Species of moth

Polyhymno hostilis is a moth of the family Gelechiidae. It was described by Edward Meyrick in 1918. It is found in Namibia, Zimbabwe and the South African provinces of Gauteng, Mpumalanga and KwaZulu-Natal.

The wingspan is about 16 mm. The forewings are bronzy brown with a strong shining white median longitudinal streak from the base to near the termen, broadest beyond the middle, where it sends a line to the termen above the tornus, then narrowed to a point. A fine costal line is found almost from the base to the middle, then very obliquely to just above the apex of the median streak and there is a narrow subdorsal white streak from the base of the dorsum to the tornus. An oblique white line is found from four-fifths of the costa, becoming silvery metallic and angulated to form a short mark on the termen beneath the apex. Above the posterior part of this is an ochreous streak running into the apical projection and there is a wedge-shaped white spot before the termen in the middle, and some irregular white marking along the termen. The hindwings are bluish grey.
