= Charltona desistalis =

Scientific classification
- Domain: Eukaryota
- Kingdom: Animalia
- Phylum: Arthropoda
- Class: Insecta
- Order: Lepidoptera
- Family: Crambidae
- Subfamily: Crambinae
- Tribe: incertae sedis
- Genus: Charltona
- Species: C. desistalis

Binomial name
- Charltona desistalis (Walker, 1863)

Synonyms
- Crambus desistalis Walker, 1863

Species of moth

Charltona desistalis is a moth in the family Crambidae. It was described by Francis Walker in 1863. It is found in Sri Lanka.

== Description ==
Its wingspan is about 36 mm. Antennae of male with short uniseriate laminated branches. Female pale ochreous, with thick brown irrorations (speckles). Palpi rufous at sides. Legs and abdomen fuscous. Forewings thickly irrorated with long blackish-brown scales. There are traces of a dark fascia in and beyond cell. A marginal black specks series. Hindwings pale fuscous.
