= Poliosia quadrifida =

Scientific classification
- Kingdom: Animalia
- Phylum: Arthropoda
- Clade: Pancrustacea
- Class: Insecta
- Order: Lepidoptera
- Superfamily: Noctuoidea
- Family: Erebidae
- Subfamily: Arctiinae
- Genus: Poliosia
- Species: P. quadrifida

Binomial name
- Poliosia quadrifida Holloway, 2001

Species of moth

Poliosia quadrifida is a moth in the family Erebidae. It was described by Jeremy Daniel Holloway in 2001. It is found on Borneo. The habitat consists of lowland forests.

The length of the forewings is 7–8 mm.
