= Poliosia pulverosa =

Scientific classification
- Domain: Eukaryota
- Kingdom: Animalia
- Phylum: Arthropoda
- Class: Insecta
- Order: Lepidoptera
- Superfamily: Noctuoidea
- Family: Erebidae
- Subfamily: Arctiinae
- Genus: Poliosia
- Species: P. pulverosa

Binomial name
- Poliosia pulverosa Kiriakoff, 1958

Species of moth

Poliosia pulverosa is a moth in the family Erebidae. It was described by Sergius G. Kiriakoff in 1958. It is found in Uganda.
