= Polyhymno multifida =

Scientific classification
- Kingdom: Animalia
- Phylum: Arthropoda
- Clade: Pancrustacea
- Class: Insecta
- Order: Lepidoptera
- Family: Gelechiidae
- Genus: Polyhymno
- Species: P. multifida

Binomial name
- Polyhymno multifida Meyrick, 1917

Species of moth

Polyhymno multifida is a moth of the family Gelechiidae. It was described by Edward Meyrick in 1917. It is found in KwaZulu-Natal, South Africa.

The wingspan is about 9 mm. The forewings are dark fuscous with the markings ochreous white. There is a fine streak along the costa from the base to the middle, then running very obliquely to near the middle of the termen, posteriorly receiving at acute angles two oblique streaks (the first postmedian) from above the fold. There are streaks from the base just above and below the fold, the upper posteriorly finely bifid, its lower branch finely connected with the postmedian streak, the lower shorter. A slender subdorsal streak is found from the base to an oblique thick streak which almost touches the base of the postmedian streak, then running along the fold to the termen. There is also a slender dorsal streak throughout, as well as a fine acute oblique streak from two-thirds of the costa to just by the apex of the preceding costal streak. The apical prominence is suffused with ochreous. The hindwings are grey.
