= Tantaliana crepax =

Scientific classification
- Kingdom: Animalia
- Phylum: Arthropoda
- Class: Insecta
- Order: Lepidoptera
- Family: Eupterotidae
- Genus: Tantaliana
- Species: T. crepax

Binomial name
- Tantaliana crepax (Wallengren, 1860)

Synonyms
- Striphnopteryx crepax Wallengren, 1860

Species of moth

Tantaliana crepax is a moth in the family Eupterotidae. It was described by Wallengren in 1860. It is found in South Africa.
