= Charltona ortellus =

Scientific classification
- Domain: Eukaryota
- Kingdom: Animalia
- Phylum: Arthropoda
- Class: Insecta
- Order: Lepidoptera
- Family: Crambidae
- Subfamily: Crambinae
- Tribe: incertae sedis
- Genus: Charltona
- Species: C. ortellus

Binomial name
- Charltona ortellus (C. Swinhoe, 1887)

Synonyms
- Chilo ortellus C. Swinhoe, 1887

Species of moth

Charltona ortellus is a moth in the family Crambidae. It was described by Charles Swinhoe in 1887. It is found in India.
