= Poliosia albida =

Scientific classification
- Kingdom: Animalia
- Phylum: Arthropoda
- Class: Insecta
- Order: Lepidoptera
- Superfamily: Noctuoidea
- Family: Erebidae
- Subfamily: Arctiinae
- Genus: Poliosia
- Species: P. albida

Binomial name
- Poliosia albida Hampson, 1914

Synonyms
- Leptilema albida (Hampson, 1914)

Species of moth

Poliosia albida is a moth in the family Erebidae. It was described by George Hampson in 1914. It is found in the Gambia and Uganda.
