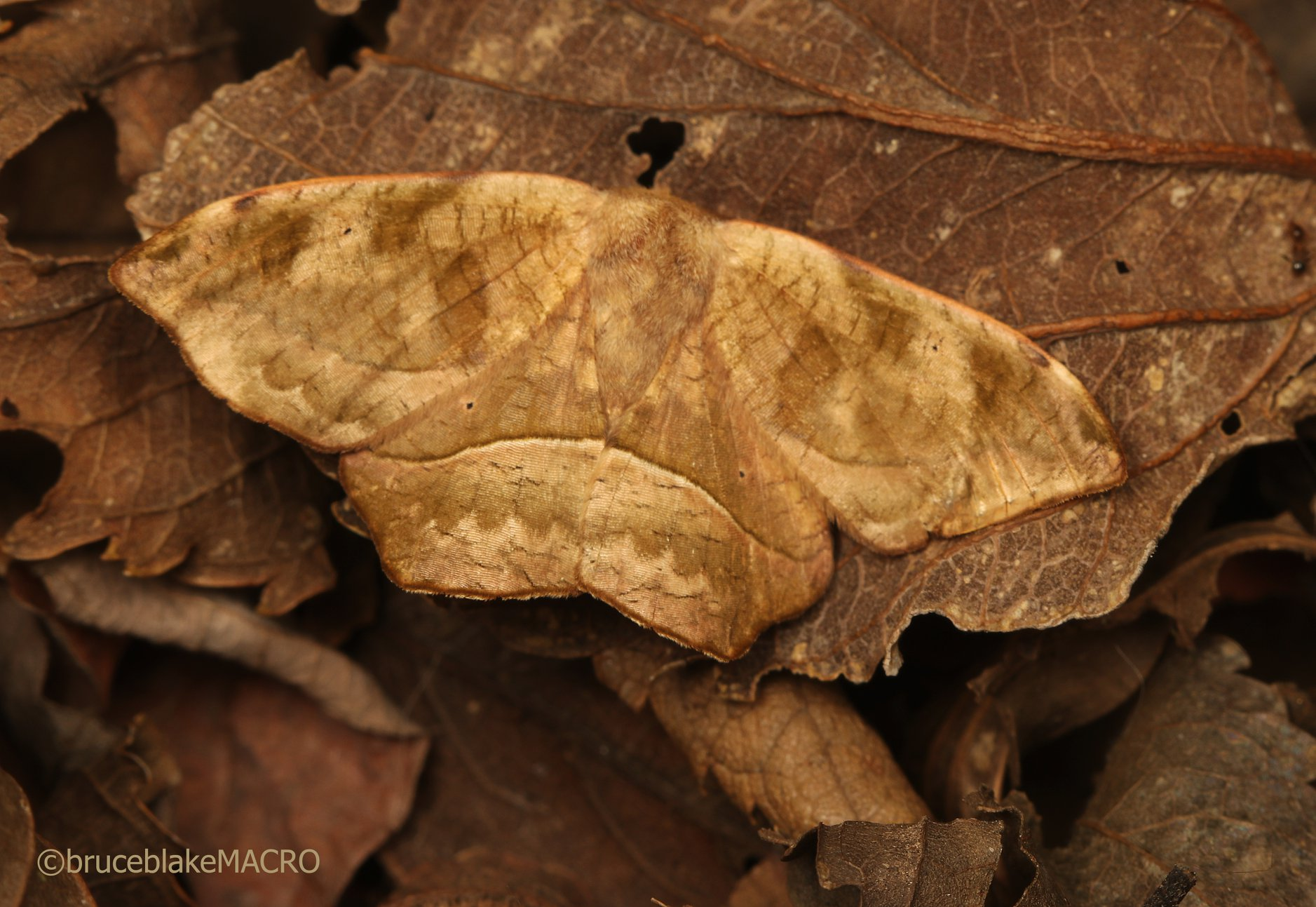

Scientific classification
- Kingdom: Animalia
- Phylum: Arthropoda
- Clade: Pancrustacea
- Class: Insecta
- Order: Lepidoptera
- Family: Drepanidae
- Genus: Negera
- Species: N. natalensis

Binomial name
- Negera natalensis (Felder, 1874)

Synonyms
- Ctenogyna natalensis Felder, 1874; Ancistrota geometroides Holland, 1893

= Negera natalensis =

Species of hook-tip moth

Negera natalensis is a moth in the family Drepanidae. It was described by Felder in 1874. It is found in Cameroon, the Central African Republic, the Democratic Republic of Congo, Gabon, Ghana, Ivory Coast, Nigeria, Senegal, Sierra Leone, South Africa, Tanzania, Gambia, Uganda and Zambia.

The larvae feed on Pavetta lanceolata and Coffea species.

== Subspecies ==
- Negera natalensis natalensis (South Africa)
- Negera natalensis geometroides (Holland, 1893) (Cameroon, Central African Republic, Democratic Republic of Congo, Gabon, Ghana, Sierra Leone, Tanzania, Uganda, Zambia)
- Negera natalensis parviluma Watson, 1965 (Ghana, Ivory Coast, Nigeria, Senegal, Gambia)
