= Polyhymno colleta =

Scientific classification
- Domain: Eukaryota
- Kingdom: Animalia
- Phylum: Arthropoda
- Class: Insecta
- Order: Lepidoptera
- Family: Gelechiidae
- Genus: Polyhymno
- Species: P. colleta

Binomial name
- Polyhymno colleta Walsingham, 1911

Species of moth

Polyhymno colleta is a moth of the family Gelechiidae. It was described by Thomas de Grey, 6th Baron Walsingham, in 1911. It is found in Mexico (Guerrero).

The wingspan is 11–12 mm. The forewings are ivory-white, the dorsal third mottled with brown, which forms also a broken line along the fold, furcate near its outer end, the point running toward the apex. A rather broad brown band occurs along the costa, a slender white line running through it from before the middle of the costa to its outer and lower extremity. This is followed by a broader oblique white streak from the commencement of the costal cilia, nearly meeting the end of the slender white line below it. A pair of shorter, triangular, geminated streaks, the outer pair in the apical cilia separated by brown on the costa, the same colour running outward below them and forming a caudate apex in the cilia. Preceding the termen and parallel to it are a few silvery metallic scales the terminal cilia being ornamented by two black spots in a white patch, margined before by brown, and behind by brownish grey. The dorsal cilia is brownish grey. The hindwings are pale bluish grey.
