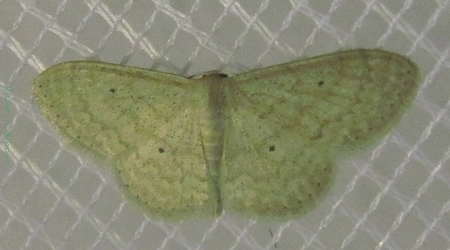

Scientific classification
- Kingdom: Animalia
- Phylum: Arthropoda
- Class: Insecta
- Order: Lepidoptera
- Family: Geometridae
- Genus: Scopula
- Species: S. lactaria

Binomial name
- Scopula lactaria (Walker, 1861)

Synonyms
- Acadalia lactaira Walker, 1861; Acidalia intervulsata Walker, 1861; Acidalia tectaria Walker, 1861

= Scopula lactaria =

Species of geometer moth in subfamily Sterrhinae

Scopula lactaria is a moth of the family Geometridae. It was described by Francis Walker in 1861. It is found in Africa south of the Sahara and on some islands of the Indian Ocean (Sokotra and Réunion). It can be distinguished from Scopula minorata only by genitalia examination.

The wingspan is 15–20 millimetres (0.59–0.79 in).

== Subspecies ==
- Scopula lactaria lactaria
- Scopula lactaria gaboosi Hausmann, 1998
