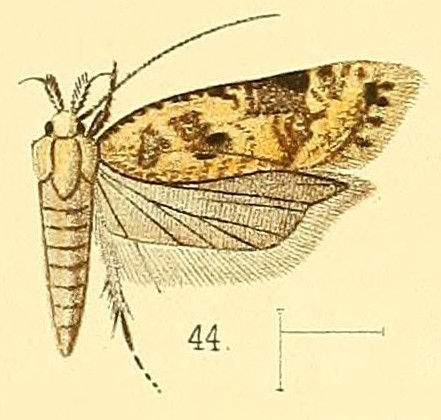

Scientific classification
- Kingdom: Animalia
- Phylum: Arthropoda
- Class: Insecta
- Order: Lepidoptera
- Family: Gelechiidae
- Genus: Dichomeris
- Species: D. marmoratus

Binomial name
- Dichomeris marmoratus (Walsingham, 1891)

Synonyms
- Ypsolophus marmoratus Walsingham, 1891; Ypsolophus basistriatus Walsingham, 1897

= Dichomeris marmoratus =

Species of moth

Dichomeris marmoratus is a moth in the family Gelechiidae. It was described by Thomas de Grey, 6th Baron Walsingham, in 1891. It is found in the Central African Republic, Namibia and Gambia.

The wingspan is about 12 mm. The forewings are dull ochreous, mottled and shaded with fuscous and with an ill-defined fuscous spot on the disc about the middle. The hindwings are grey.
