= Tantaliana tantalus =

Scientific classification
- Kingdom: Animalia
- Phylum: Arthropoda
- Clade: Pancrustacea
- Class: Insecta
- Order: Lepidoptera
- Family: Eupterotidae
- Genus: Tantaliana
- Species: T. tantalus

Binomial name
- Tantaliana tantalus (Herrich-Schäffer, 1854)

Synonyms
- Jana tantalus Herrich-Schäffer, 1854

Species of moth

Tantaliana tantalus is a moth in the family Eupterotidae. It was described by Gottlieb August Wilhelm Herrich-Schäffer in 1854. It is found in South Africa and the Gambia.
