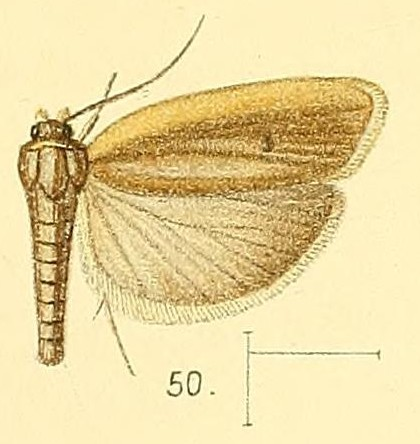
- Illustration

Scientific classification
- Domain: Eukaryota
- Kingdom: Animalia
- Phylum: Arthropoda
- Class: Insecta
- Order: Lepidoptera
- Family: Depressariidae
- Genus: Stenoma
- Species: S. complanella

Binomial name
- Stenoma complanella (Walsingham, 1891)

Synonyms
- Ide complanella Walsingham, 1891

= Stenoma complanella =

Species of moth

Stenoma complanella is a moth in the family Depressariidae. It was described by Lord Walsingham in 1891. It is found in Gambia and the Democratic Republic of the Congo (Katanga).

The wingspan is 15–16 mm. The forewings are a greyish stone colour, tinged with ochreous along the costal margin throughout their length. The hindwings are stone grey.
