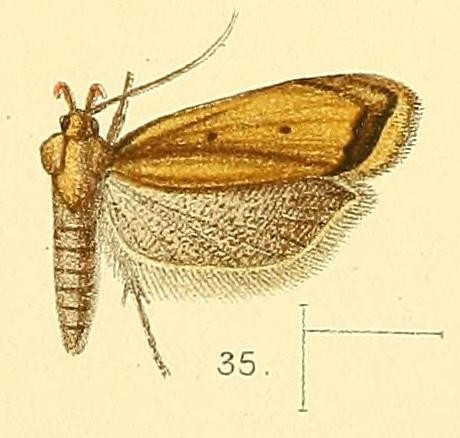

Scientific classification
- Domain: Eukaryota
- Kingdom: Animalia
- Phylum: Arthropoda
- Class: Insecta
- Order: Lepidoptera
- Family: Gelechiidae
- Genus: Dichomeris
- Species: D. marginata

Binomial name
- Dichomeris marginata (Walsingham, 1891)

Synonyms
- Brachycrossata marginata Walsingham, 1891

= Dichomeris marginata =

Species of moth

Dichomeris marginata is a moth in the family Gelechiidae. It was described by Thomas de Grey, 6th Baron Walsingham, in 1891. It is found in Gambia.

The wingspan is 15–17 mm. The forewings are pale fawn-brown with a discal spot before the middle and a band of even width from the apex to the anal angle, but not reaching the costal margin, greyish fuscous. There is also an obscure outwardly oblique costal streak of the same colour before the apex and a very faint indication of a second spot at the end of the cell. The hindwings are greyish-fuscous.
