= Stigmella zizyphi =

Scientific classification
- Kingdom: Animalia
- Phylum: Arthropoda
- Class: Insecta
- Order: Lepidoptera
- Family: Nepticulidae
- Genus: Stigmella
- Species: S. zizyphi

Binomial name
- Stigmella zizyphi (Walsingham, 1911)

Synonyms
- Stigmella ziziphivora Gustafsson, 1985

Species of moth

Stigmella zizyphi is a moth of the family Nepticulidae. It was described by Walsingham in 1911 and is endemic to Algeria.

The larvae feed on Ziziphus lotus. They mine the leaves of their host plant.
