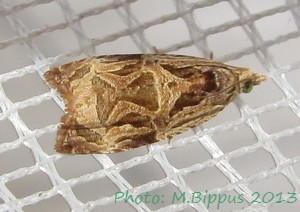

Scientific classification
- Kingdom: Animalia
- Phylum: Arthropoda
- Class: Insecta
- Order: Lepidoptera
- Family: Tortricidae
- Genus: Eccopsis
- Species: E. incultana

Binomial name
- Eccopsis incultana (Walker, 1863)

Synonyms
- Batodes incultana Walker, 1863; Eccopsis undosa Diakonoff, 1981

= Eccopsis incultana =

Species of moth

Eccopsis incultana is a moth of the family Tortricidae. It is found in western, central, eastern and southern Africa, including most African islands of the Atlantic and Indian Ocean.
