= Negera confusa =

Scientific classification
- Kingdom: Animalia
- Phylum: Arthropoda
- Class: Insecta
- Order: Lepidoptera
- Family: Drepanidae
- Genus: Negera
- Species: N. confusa

Binomial name
- Negera confusa Walker, 1855

Synonyms
- Ctenogyna lytaea Druce, 1896

Species of hook-tip moth

Negera confusa is a moth in the family Drepanidae. It was described by Francis Walker in 1855. It is found in Cameroon, Ghana, Ivory Coast, Nigeria, Sierra Leone and the Gambia.

The length of the forewings is 19–23 mm.
