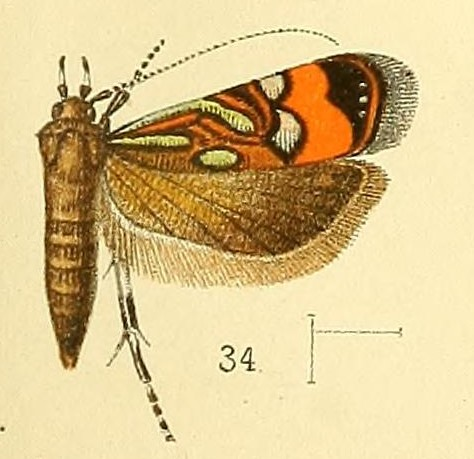

Scientific classification
- Domain: Eukaryota
- Kingdom: Animalia
- Phylum: Arthropoda
- Class: Insecta
- Order: Lepidoptera
- Family: Gelechiidae
- Genus: Tricyanaula
- Species: T. metallica

Binomial name
- Tricyanaula metallica (Walsingham, 1891)

Synonyms
- Strobisia metallica Walsingham, 1891; Helcystogramma metallicum

= Tricyanaula metallica =

Species of moth

Tricyanaula metallica is a moth of the family Gelechiidae. It was described by Thomas de Grey, 6th Baron Walsingham, in 1891. It is found in South Africa and Gambia.

The wingspan is about 11 mm. The forewings are bronzy brown on the basal two-thirds, streaked with fuscous between the metallic markings, which are as follows: first a conspicuous bright steel-blue stripe along the costa from base, depressed and somewhat widened before the middle of the wing, ending above the fold at about half the wing-length. This stripe is slightly dark-margined throughout. Below it is a streak of a similar colour running along the fold from the base, and ending before the middle of the fold closely above a detached elongate spot of the same metallic steel-blue, lying immediately below the fold beyond its middle. At two-thirds the wing-length are two conspicuous lilac metallic spots, the first, costal, reaching less than half-way across the wing, the other, dorsal, almost connected with it, and occupying more than half the width of the wing. These are also distinctly dark-margined. Beyond them is a broad bright orange-yellow fascia completely crossing the wing and the apical portion of the wing is fuscous, containing three small metallic spots, parallel with the apical margin, and separated from it by an orange streak. The hindwings are brownish fuscous.
