= Eccopsis nebulana =

Scientific classification
- Domain: Eukaryota
- Kingdom: Animalia
- Phylum: Arthropoda
- Class: Insecta
- Order: Lepidoptera
- Family: Tortricidae
- Genus: Eccopsis
- Species: E. nebulana

Binomial name
- Eccopsis nebulana Walsingham, 1891

Species of moth

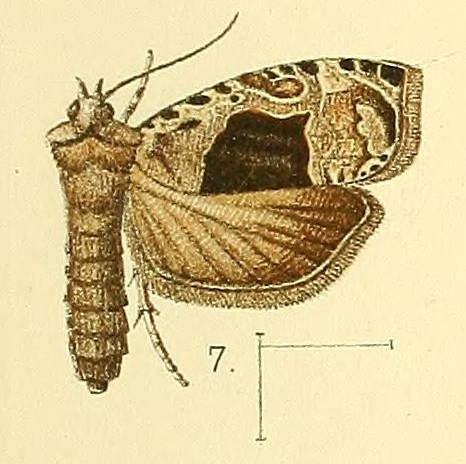
Eccopsis nebulana

Eccopsis nebulana is a moth of the family Tortricidae. It is found in central, southern and eastern Africa, including the Seychelles.
