= Eccopsis wahlbergiana =

Scientific classification
- Kingdom: Animalia
- Phylum: Arthropoda
- Clade: Pancrustacea
- Class: Insecta
- Order: Lepidoptera
- Family: Tortricidae
- Genus: Eccopsis
- Species: E. wahlbergiana

Binomial name
- Eccopsis wahlbergiana Zeller, 1852

Synonyms
- Eccopsis fluctuatana Walsingham, 1881

Species of moth

Eccopsis wahlbergiana is a moth of the family Tortricidae. It is found throughout of subtropical Africa, from Sénégal to South Africa, including the islands of Comoros, Cape Verde and Madagascar.

Known host plants of the larvae are Euphorbiaceae (Ricinus sp. and Ricinus communis).
