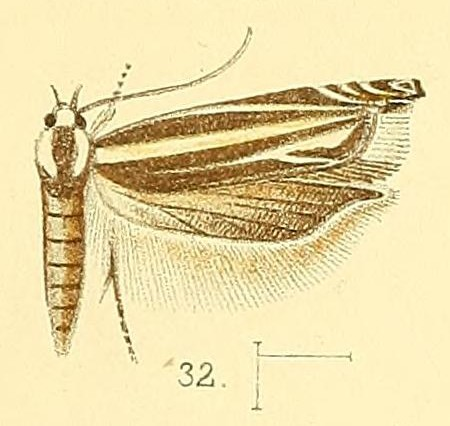

Scientific classification
- Domain: Eukaryota
- Kingdom: Animalia
- Phylum: Arthropoda
- Class: Insecta
- Order: Lepidoptera
- Family: Gelechiidae
- Genus: Polyhymno
- Species: P. cleodorella

Binomial name
- Polyhymno cleodorella Walsingham, 1891

= Polyhymno cleodorella =

Species of moth

Polyhymno cleodorella is a moth of the family Gelechiidae. It is found in Gambia.

The wingspan is about 12 mm. The forewings are brown, with shining white longitudinal streaks and ante-apical costal geminations. A wide central white streak from the base, slightly nearer to the costal than to the dorsal margin, is attenuated beyond the middle, and almost reaches the apical margin below the falcate apex. A more slender line of white on the extreme costal margin from near the base is deflexed about the middle of the costal margin, and runs very obliquely outwards, ending slightly beyond and above the end of the central streak. A third white line, starting at the basal third below the fold, crosses the fold beyond the middle, and is somewhat dilated towards its apex, opposite to the middle of the apical margin and on a level with the apex of the upper line. This third line gives off a short oblique branch beneath, which commences on and follows the fold to near the anal angle. There are three short outwardly oblique costal streaks immediately before the apex, and two minute ones above the apex itself in the apical cilia. The hindwings are brownish grey.
