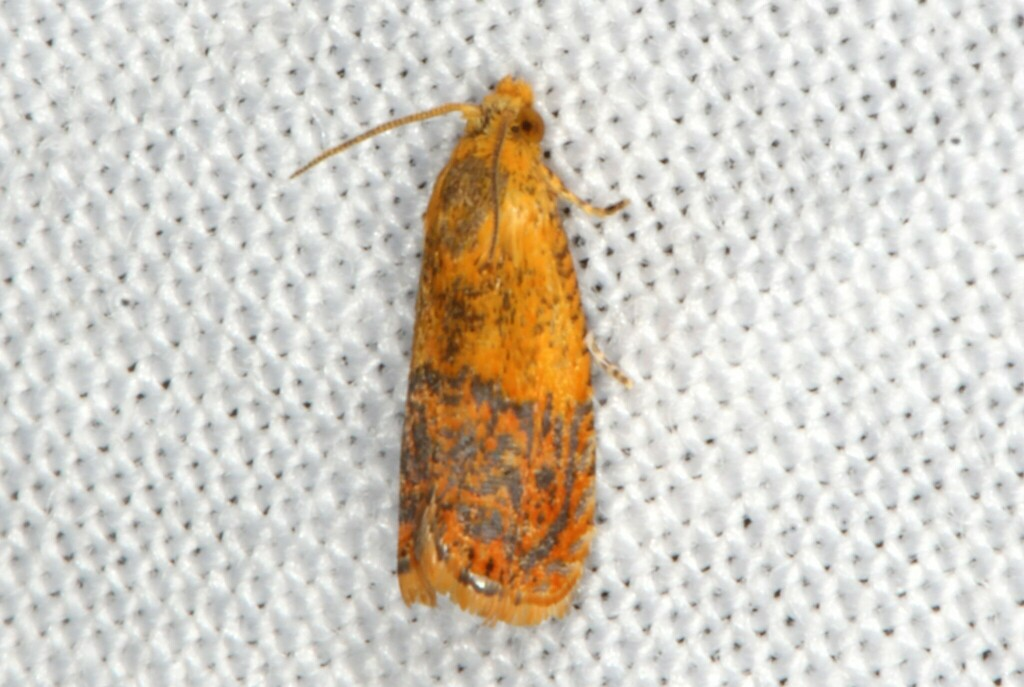
- Grapholita dimidiata

Scientific classification
- Kingdom: Animalia
- Phylum: Arthropoda
- Clade: Pancrustacea
- Class: Insecta
- Order: Lepidoptera
- Family: Tortricidae
- Genus: Grapholita
- Species: G. dimidiata

Binomial name
- Grapholita dimidiata Walsingham, 1891

= Grapholita dimidiata =

Species of moth from Africa

Grapholita dimidiata is a species of moth in the family Tortricidae. It is found in The Gambia.
