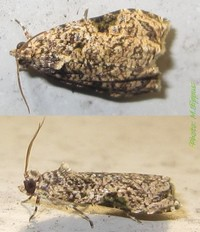

Scientific classification
- Kingdom: Animalia
- Phylum: Arthropoda
- Clade: Pancrustacea
- Class: Insecta
- Order: Lepidoptera
- Family: Tortricidae
- Subfamily: Olethreutinae
- Tribe: Olethreutini
- Genus: Eccopsis; Zeller, 1852

Type species
- Eccopsis wahlbergiana Zeller, 1852

= Eccopsis =

Genus of tortrix moths

Eccopsis is a genus of moths belonging to the subfamily Olethreutinae of the family Tortricidae.

== Species ==
- Eccopsis aegidia (Meyrick, 1932)
- Eccopsis affluens (Meyrick, 1921)
- Eccopsis agassizi Aarvik, 2004
- Eccopsis brunneopostica Razowski & Trematerra, 2010
- Eccopsis deprinsi Aarvik, 2004
- Eccopsis eltundana Razowski & Wojtusiak, 2008
- Eccopsis encardia Diakonoff, 1983
- Eccopsis floreana Razowski & Landry, 2008
- Eccopsis galapagana Razowski & Landry, 2008
- Eccopsis hathra Razowski & Wojtusiak, 2012
- Eccopsis heterodon Diakonoff, 1981
- Eccopsis incultana (Walker, 1863)
  - syn. Eccopsis trixiphias (Meyrick, 1939)
  - syn. Eccopsis undosa Diakonoff, 1981
- Eccopsis maschalista (Meyrick, 1932)
- Eccopsis morogoro Aarvik, 2004
- Eccopsis nebulana Walsingham, 1891
- Eccopsis ninicecelie Aarvik, 2004
- Eccopsis ochrana Aarvik, 2004
- Eccopsis orchlora (Meyrick, 1920)
- Eccopsis ofcolacona Razowski, 2008
- Eccopsis praecedens Walsingham, 1897
- Eccopsis ptilonota (Meyrick, 1921)
- Eccopsis sequestra Razowski & Wojtusiak, 2012
- Eccopsis subincana Razowski & Trematerra, 2010
- Eccopsis tucki Aarvik, 2004
- Eccopsis wahlbergiana Zeller, 1852
  - Syn. Eccopsis fluctuatana Walsingham, 1881

== See also ==
- List of Tortricidae genera
