= Licmocera =

Scientific classification
- Kingdom: Animalia
- Phylum: Arthropoda
- Clade: Pancrustacea
- Class: Insecta
- Order: Lepidoptera
- Family: Elachistidae
- Subfamily: Parametriotinae
- Genus: Licmocera; Walsingham, 1891
- Species: L. lyonetiella

Binomial name
- Licmocera lyonetiella Walsingham, 1891

Species of moth

Licmocera lyonetiella is a species of moth in the family Elachistidae. It is the only species in the genus Licmocera. It was described by Thomas de Grey, 6th Baron Walsingham in 1891. This species is currently known to occur only in The Gambia.
