= Thyretes caffra =

Scientific classification
- Kingdom: Animalia
- Phylum: Arthropoda
- Class: Insecta
- Order: Lepidoptera
- Superfamily: Noctuoidea
- Family: Erebidae
- Subfamily: Arctiinae
- Genus: Thyretes
- Species: T. caffra

Binomial name
- Thyretes caffra Wallengren, 1863

Species of moth

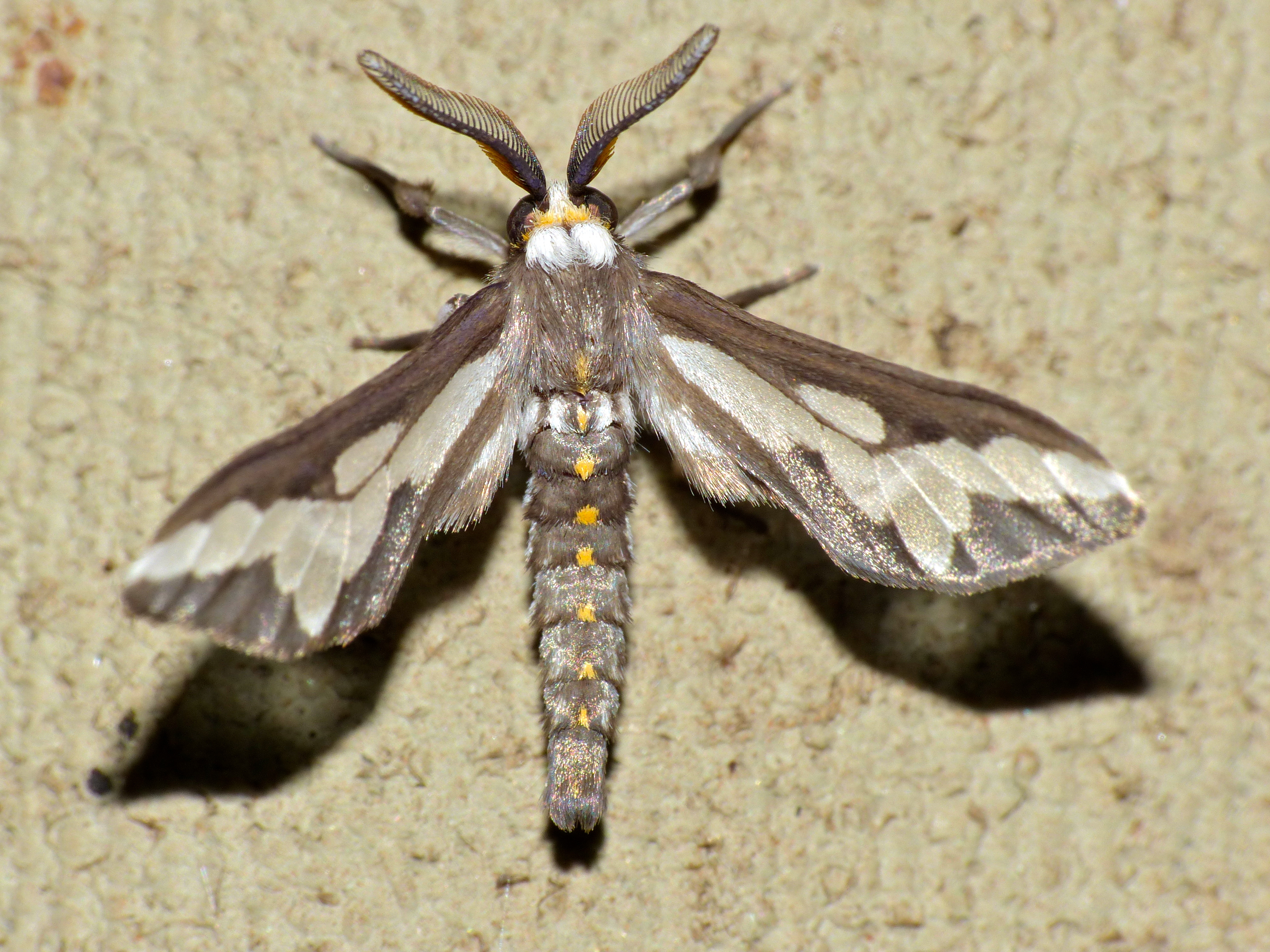
Thyretes caffra

Thyretes caffra is a moth in the family Erebidae. It was described by Wallengren in 1863. It is found in Botswana, Lesotho, Mozambique, Namibia, Sierra Leone, South Africa, Gambia, Zambia and Zimbabwe.

The larvae feed on Acacia karroo.
