= List of moths of Australia (Scythrididae) =

Partial list of Australian moths

This is a list of the Australian moth species of the family Scythrididae. It also acts as an index to the species articles and forms part of the full List of moths of Australia.

- Eretmocera chrysias (Meyrick, 1886)
- Eretmocera coracopis (Turner, 1926)
- Eretmocera cyanauges Turner, 1913
- Eretmocera dioctis (Meyrick, 1897)
- Scythris adelopa Meyrick, 1897
- Scythris celidopa Meyrick, 1921
- Scythris ceratocosma Meyrick, 1897
- Scythris crypsigramma Meyrick, 1897
- Scythris detestata Meyrick, 1922
- Scythris diatoma (Turner, 1927)
- Scythris erebospila Meyrick, 1897
- Scythris fumida Turner, 1923
- Scythris hologramma (Lower, 1899)
- Scythris leucochyta (Turner, 1947)
- Scythris paredra Meyrick, 1897
- Scythris pleonectis Meyrick, 1897
- Scythris plocanota Meyrick, 1897
- Scythris praestructa Meyrick, 1922
- Scythris rhabducha Meyrick, 1897
- Scythris sporadica Meyrick, 1897
- Scythris xenonympha (Lower, 1900)
