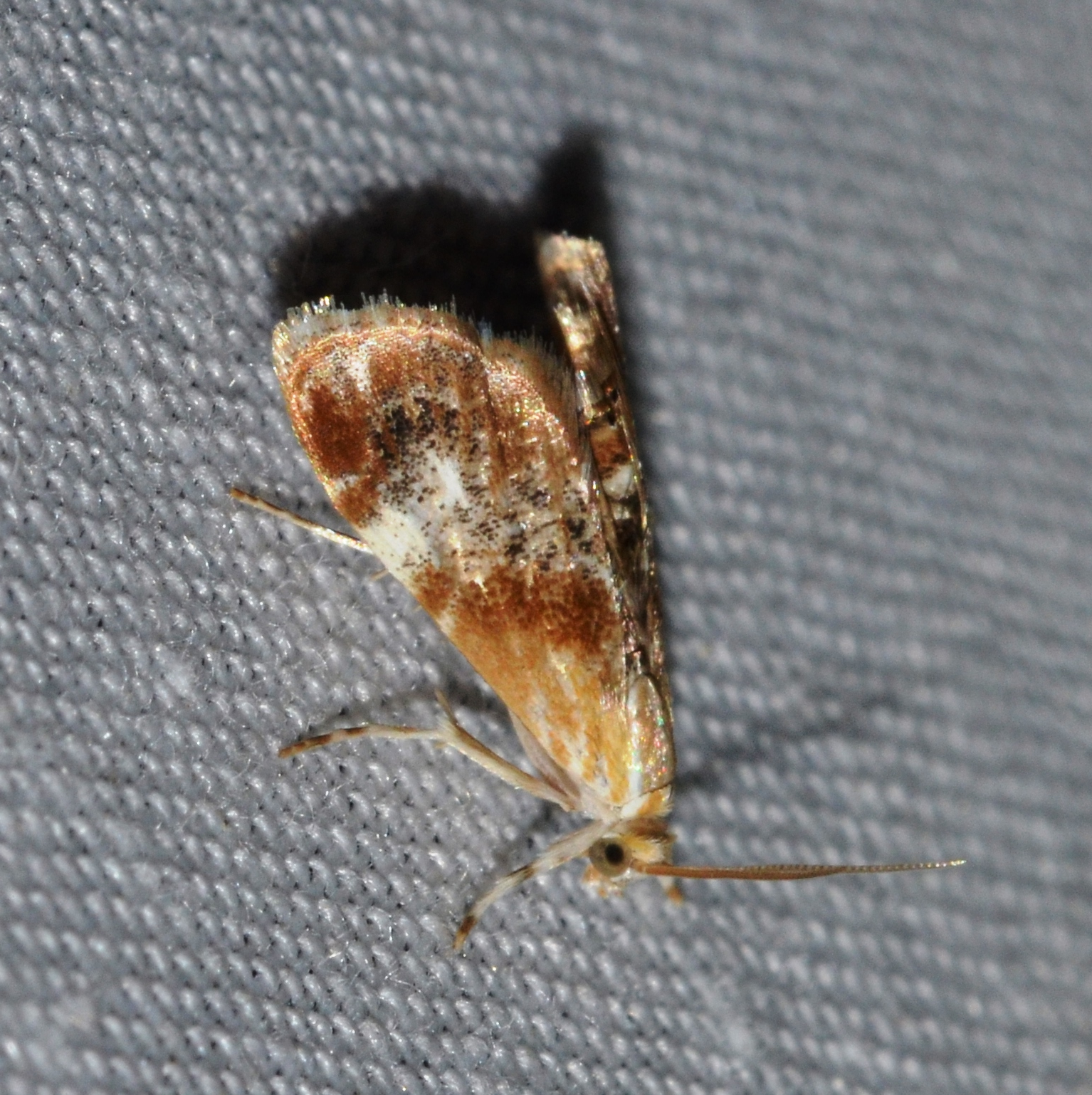

Scientific classification
- Kingdom: Animalia
- Phylum: Arthropoda
- Class: Insecta
- Order: Lepidoptera
- Family: Crambidae
- Genus: Dicymolomia
- Species: D. julianalis

Binomial name
- Dicymolomia julianalis (Walker, 1859)

Synonyms
- Cataclysta julianalis Walker, 1859; Dicymolomia decora Zeller, 1872

= Dicymolomia julianalis =

Species of moth

Dicymolomia julianalis, or Julia's dicymolomia moth, is a moth of the family Crambidae. It is found in most of eastern North America and in Cuba.

== Diet ==
The larvae have a diverse diet and have been recorded feeding on Astragalus canadensis and Cirsium lecontei. They have also been recorded as internal feeders in cattails (Typha species) and cactus stems (Opuntia species). Furthermore, they feed on senescent cotton bolls (Gossypium species) and are also known as predators on the eggs and larvae of Thyridopteryx ephemeraeformis.
