= Hans Georg Amsel =

German entomologist

Hans Georg Amsel (29 March 1905 – 20 October 1999) was a German entomologist with four publications ranging from 1951 to 1962. His home town was Cologne, although he frequently was in Kiel. His original job was in the banking industry, and he later worked in a bookstore. After quitting his job as bookstore worker, he decided to follow his heart and transfer to zoology, where he became an entomologist. His specific profession was studying Lepidoptera. "Soon after he was appointed as Head of Department of Entomology at the Colonial and Overseas museum called to Bremen, then rendered military service and, worked as a private scholar, he came as entomologist at the State Collections of Natural History in Karlsruhe," states a letter for his 60th birthday from the Journal of the Entomological Society of Vienna. During Amsel's career, he authored about twenty-six different Lepidoptera species and genera, and published four books.

== Species and genera described ==
- Agdistis adenensis
- Ananarsia
- Ascalenia eremella
- Aureopteryx
- Autophila einsleri
- Bagdadia irakella
- Bifalculina
- Bifalculina argentipunctalis
- Bifascia
- Bifascia yemenella
- Cnephasia palestinensis
- Cosmopterosis
- Cosmopteryx formosa
- Elachista jerichoella
- Elachista nuraghella
- Eretmocera arabica
- Eretmocera bradleyi
- Euxanthis meincki
- Euxanthis subflavana
- Glyphodes interruptalis
- Gypsonoma obraztsovi
- Katja
- Ommatopteryx congruentella
- Praekatja
- Pygmaeotinea crisostomella
- Pyralosis

== Eponymy ==
The following species are named for him:

- Scrobipalpa amseli

== See also ==
- Category:Taxa named by Hans Georg Amsel
