= Bagdadia =

Scientific classification
- Domain: Eukaryota
- Kingdom: Animalia
- Phylum: Arthropoda
- Class: Insecta
- Order: Lepidoptera
- Family: Gelechiidae
- Tribe: Chelariini
- Genus: Bagdadia; Amsel, 1949

Synonyms
- Capidentalia Park, 1995

Genus of moths

Bagdadia is a genus of moths in the family Gelechiidae.

== Species ==
- Bagdadia claviformis (Park, 1993)
- Bagdadia cymoptila (Meyrick, 1929)
- Bagdadia eucalla (Li & Zheng, 1998)
- Bagdadia gnomia (Ponomarenko, 1995)
- Bagdadia irakella Amsel, 1949
- Bagdadia isosema (Meyrick, 1921)
- Bagdadia khaoensis (Park & Ponomarenko, 1999)
- Bagdadia paroctas (Meyrick, 1913)
- Bagdadia salicicola (Park, 1995)
- Bagdadia salicicolella (Kuznetsov, 1960)
- Bagdadia sapindivora (Clarke, 1958)
- Bagdadia tricornis Yang & Li, 2015
- Bagdadia tugaella (Ponomarenko, 1995)
- Bagdadia yanglingensis (Li & Zheng, 1998)
