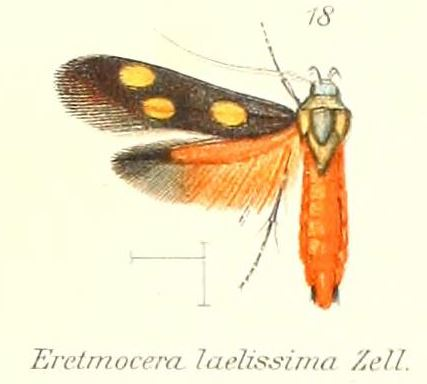
- Eretmocera laetissima

Scientific classification
- Kingdom: Animalia
- Phylum: Arthropoda
- Clade: Pancrustacea
- Class: Insecta
- Order: Lepidoptera
- Family: Scythrididae
- Genus: Eretmocera; Zeller, 1852

Type species
- Eretmocera fuscipennis Zeller, 1852

Synonyms
- Aeraula Meyrick, 1897; Castorura Meyrick, 1887; Exodomorpha Walker, 1864; Leuroscelis Turner, 1926; Staintonia Staudinger, 1859

= Eretmocera =

Genus of moths

Eretmocera is a genus of moths in the family Scythrididae.

== Species ==
- Eretmocera agassizi Bengtsson, 2014
- Eretmocera albistriata Legrand, 1966
- Eretmocera alenica Strand, 1913
- Eretmocera arabica Amsel, 1961
- Eretmocera aurovittata Pagenstecher, 1900 (from the Bismarck islands)
- Eretmocera basistrigata Walsingham, 1889
- Eretmocera benitonis Strand, 1913
- Eretmocera bradleyi Amsel, 1961
- Eretmocera chrysias (Meyrick, 1887) (from Australia)
- Eretmocera contermina Meyrick, 1926
- Eretmocera coracopis (Turner, 1927) (from Australia)
- Eretmocera cyanauges Turner, 1913 (from Australia)
- Eretmocera cyanosoma Meyrick, 1910 (from Sumba)
- Eretmocera dioctis (Meyrick, 1897) (from Australia)
- Eretmocera dorsistrigata Walsingham, 1889
- Eretmocera fasciata Walsingham, 1896
- Eretmocera florifera Meyrick, 1909
- Eretmocera fuscipennis Zeller, 1852
- Eretmocera hafeetensis Roberts & Bengtsson, 2023
- Eretmocera haemogastra Meyrick, 1936
- Eretmocera homalocrossa Meyrick, 1930
- Eretmocera impactella (Walker, 1864)
- Eretmocera jemensis Rebel, 1930
- Eretmocera katangensis Bengtsson, 2014
- Eretmocera kochi Bengtsson, 2014
- Eretmocera laetissima Zeller, 1852
- Eretmocera letabensis Bengtsson, 2014
- Eretmocera levicornella Rebel, 1917
- Eretmocera lyneborgi Bengtsson, 2014
- Eretmocera malelanensis Bengtsson, 2014
- Eretmocera medinella (Staudinger, 1859)
- Eretmocera meyi Bengtsson, 2014
- Eretmocera microbarbara Walsingham, 1907 (from Algeria)
- Eretmocera monophaea Meyrick, 1927
- Eretmocera nomadica Walsingham, 1907 (from Algeria)
- Eretmocera pachypennis Strand, 1913
- Eretmocera percnophanes Meyrick, 1929 (from the Philippines)
- Eretmocera rubripennis Meyrick, 1915 (from India)
- Eretmocera scatospila Zeller, 1852
- Eretmocera shoabensis Rebel, 1907
- Eretmocera syleuta Meyrick, 1926
- Eretmocera thephagones van Gijen, 1912 (from Java)
- Eretmocera tiwiensis Bengtsson, 2014
- Eretmocera typhonica Meyrick, 1917
- Eretmocera xanthonota Meyrick, 1910 (from Sumba)

== Former species ==
- Eretmocera carteri Walsingham, 1889
- Eretmocera illucens Meyrick, 1914
