= Eretmocera alenica =

Scientific classification
- Kingdom: Animalia
- Phylum: Arthropoda
- Class: Insecta
- Order: Lepidoptera
- Family: Scythrididae
- Genus: Eretmocera
- Species: E. alenica

Binomial name
- Eretmocera alenica Strand, 1913

Species of moth

Eretmocera alenica is a moth of the family Scythrididae. It was described by Strand in 1913. It is found in Equatorial Guinea.

The wingspan is about 12 mm. The forewings are black, bronzy dorsally and purplish along the termen. The fringes are black, with a pale yellow, oval, oblique spot at the tornus. Opposite the tornal spot is a very faint, pale yellow costal spot. Ventrally, there is a red streak, not reaching the termen, with a yellowish gloss, distally reddish-purplish. The hindwings and its fringes are blood-red in the basal half dorsally and ventrally and black with a faint bronze shine at the apical half.
