= Eretmocera fuscipennis =

Scientific classification
- Kingdom: Animalia
- Phylum: Arthropoda
- Clade: Pancrustacea
- Class: Insecta
- Order: Lepidoptera
- Family: Scythrididae
- Genus: Eretmocera
- Species: E. fuscipennis

Binomial name
- Eretmocera fuscipennis Zeller, 1852

Synonyms
- Eretmocera carteri Walsingham, 1889; Exodomorpha derogatella Walker, 1864; Exodomorpha inclusella Walker, 1864; Eretmocera lunifera Zeller, 1852; Eretmocera miniata Walsingham, 1889

Species of moth

Eretmocera fuscipennis is a moth of the family Scythrididae. It was described by Philipp Christoph Zeller in 1852. It is found in the Democratic Republic of the Congo (Katanga), Gambia, Madagascar, Sierra Leone, South Africa (KwaZulu-Natal), Tanzania (Zanzibar) and Zimbabwe.

The wingspan is 11–13 mm. Adults have been recorded on wing year round.

The larvae feed on Clerodendrum species.
