= Bagdadia sapindivora =

Scientific classification
- Domain: Eukaryota
- Kingdom: Animalia
- Phylum: Arthropoda
- Class: Insecta
- Order: Lepidoptera
- Family: Gelechiidae
- Genus: Bagdadia
- Species: B. sapindivora

Binomial name
- Bagdadia sapindivora (Clarke, 1958)

Synonyms
- Chelaria sapindivora Clarke, 1958; Hypatima sapindivora Clarke, 1958

Species of moth

Bagdadia sapindivora is a moth in the family Gelechiidae. It was described by John Frederick Gates Clarke in 1958. It is found in Honshu, Japan.

The wingspan is 13–17 mm.

The larvae feed on Sapindus mukurossi.
