= Bagdadia yanglingensis =

Scientific classification
- Domain: Eukaryota
- Kingdom: Animalia
- Phylum: Arthropoda
- Class: Insecta
- Order: Lepidoptera
- Family: Gelechiidae
- Genus: Bagdadia
- Species: B. yanglingensis

Binomial name
- Bagdadia yanglingensis (H.-H. Li & Z.-M. Zheng, 1998)

Synonyms
- Capidentalia yanglingensis H.-H. Li & Z.-M. Zheng, 1998

Species of moth

Bagdadia yanglingensis is a moth in the family Gelechiidae. It was described by Hou-Hun Li and Zhe-Min Zheng in 1998. It is found in China.
