= Eretmocera medinella =

Scientific classification
- Domain: Eukaryota
- Kingdom: Animalia
- Phylum: Arthropoda
- Class: Insecta
- Order: Lepidoptera
- Family: Scythrididae
- Genus: Eretmocera
- Species: E. medinella

Binomial name
- Eretmocera medinella (Staudinger, 1859)

Synonyms
- Staintonia medinella Staudinger, 1859

Species of moth

Eretmocera medinella is a moth of the family Scythrididae. It was described by Otto Staudinger in 1859. It is found in Spain, Sardinia, Russia and Turkey (Erzurum and Igdir Provinces).

The wingspan is 10–12 mm.

The larvae feed on Suaeda species.
