= Eretmocera xanthonota =

Scientific classification
- Kingdom: Animalia
- Phylum: Arthropoda
- Class: Insecta
- Order: Lepidoptera
- Family: Scythrididae
- Genus: Eretmocera
- Species: E. xanthonota

Binomial name
- Eretmocera xanthonota Meyrick, 1910

Species of moth

Eretmocera xanthonota is a moth of the family Scythrididae. It was described by Edward Meyrick in 1910. It is found on Sumba.

The wingspan is 16–17 mm. The forewings are very deep purple with four ochreous-yellow or orange spots, the first on the dorsum at one-fourth of the wing small, the others moderately large, roundish, in the disc at two-fifths, on the tornus, and on the costa at four-fifths respectively. The hindwings are dark purple-fuscous.
