= Dicymolomia opuntialis =

Scientific classification
- Kingdom: Animalia
- Phylum: Arthropoda
- Class: Insecta
- Order: Lepidoptera
- Family: Crambidae
- Genus: Dicymolomia
- Species: D. opuntialis

Binomial name
- Dicymolomia opuntialis Dyar, 1908

Species of moth

Dicymolomia opuntialis is a moth in the family Crambidae. It is found in North America, where it has been recorded from California.

The wingspan is about 13 mm. The forewings are silvery grey with a fulvous-orange base. There is a wavy black line with an orange blotch at the costa. The hindwings are silvery grey with five black marginal spots, separated by metallic scales and shaded with dull orange. Adults are on wing from May to September.

The larvae feed on Opuntia species, mining in the joints of the cactus pads.
