= Eretmocera pachypennis =

Scientific classification
- Domain: Eukaryota
- Kingdom: Animalia
- Phylum: Arthropoda
- Class: Insecta
- Order: Lepidoptera
- Family: Scythrididae
- Genus: Eretmocera
- Species: E. pachypennis

Binomial name
- Eretmocera pachypennis Strand, 1913

Species of moth

Eretmocera pachypennis is a moth of the family Scythrididae. It was described by Strand in 1913. It is found in Equatorial Guinea.
