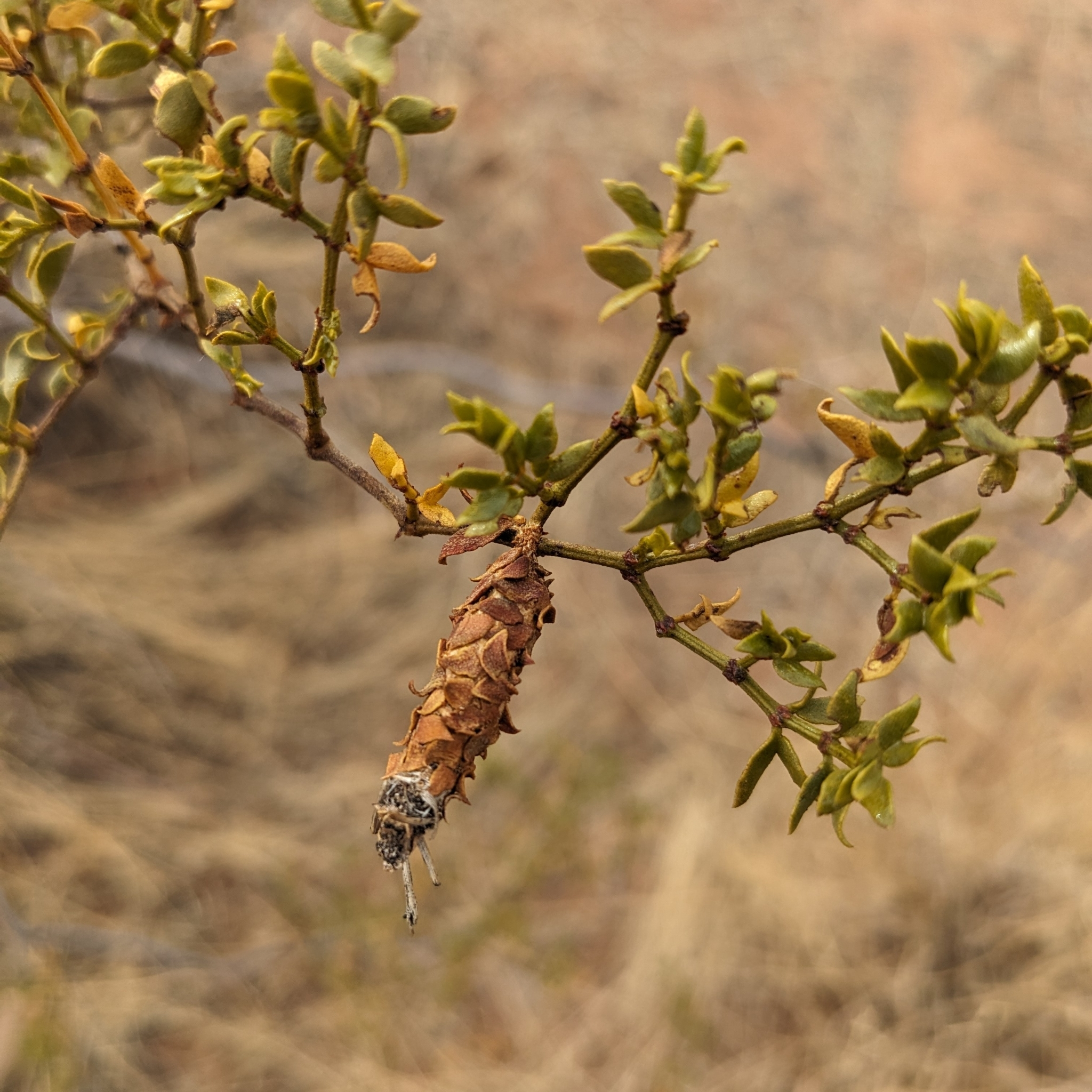
- Creosote bush bagworm (Thyridopteryx meadii) bag in St. George, Utah

Scientific classification
- Kingdom: Animalia
- Phylum: Arthropoda
- Class: Insecta
- Order: Lepidoptera
- Family: Psychidae
- Genus: Thyridopteryx
- Species: T. meadii

Binomial name
- Thyridopteryx meadii Edwards, 1881

= Thyridopteryx meadii =

Species of moth

Thyridopteryx meadii is a species of North American bagworm moth that specializes in the creosote bush (Larrea tridentata).

== Description ==
The creosote bagworm construct bags 30-40 mm long from creosote leaf or twig fragments, or a mixture of the two. They spend the majority of their lives inside the bag, except for the male which emerges from the bag after pupation as a moth with scaleless, semi-transparent white wings and a long, black, furry-looking body. Like other bagworms, the female retains a larval appearance after pupation, and stays inside her bag while adult males fly around seeking their scent.

== Range ==
It ranges throughout the Mojave Desert, wherever the creosote bush is found and has been recorded in California, Texas, Arizona, and Utah.

== Ecology and phenology ==
The creosote bagworm moth feeds on the creosote bush, and is the primary insect contributor to flower death during their defoliating activities. Rather than following a fixed annual cycle, they respond opportunistically to rainfall, which results in softer new growth on their host plant. They survive long periods of drought and frosty wintertime temperatures either as larvae or as eggs, sealed inside the bag. When rains return, eggs hatch and larvae quickly resume activity. The lifecycle of one bagworm can be completed in a matter of weeks, if conditions are favorable, or stretch out as larvae can remain dormant for at least a year. The most active time of the year is likely during the late summer monsoon.

== Etymology ==
Thyridopteryx meadii is named after entomologist T. L. Mead, who collected the type specimen in California.
