= Bagdadia isosema =

Scientific classification
- Kingdom: Animalia
- Phylum: Arthropoda
- Class: Insecta
- Order: Lepidoptera
- Family: Gelechiidae
- Genus: Bagdadia
- Species: B. isosema

Binomial name
- Bagdadia isosema (Meyrick, 1921)

Synonyms
- Chelaria isosema Meyrick, 1921; Hypatima isosema

Species of moth

Bagdadia isosema is a moth in the family Gelechiidae. It was described by Edward Meyrick in 1921. It is found in Zimbabwe.

The wingspan is about 15 mm. The forewings are grey, more or less speckled with whitish, with scattered dark fuscous scales and with a short fine black dash beneath the costa near the base, as well as two narrow semi-oval blackish almost adjacent blotches extending on the costa from about one-fifth to three-fifths, each followed by a raised tuft of scales that are whitish posteriorly. The stigmata are indicated by irregular angular spots outlined by scattered blackish scales and there is a curved-angulated subterminal series of suffused irregular dark fuscous spots, and a marginal series of cloudy spots around the posterior part of the costa and termen. The hindwings are grey.
