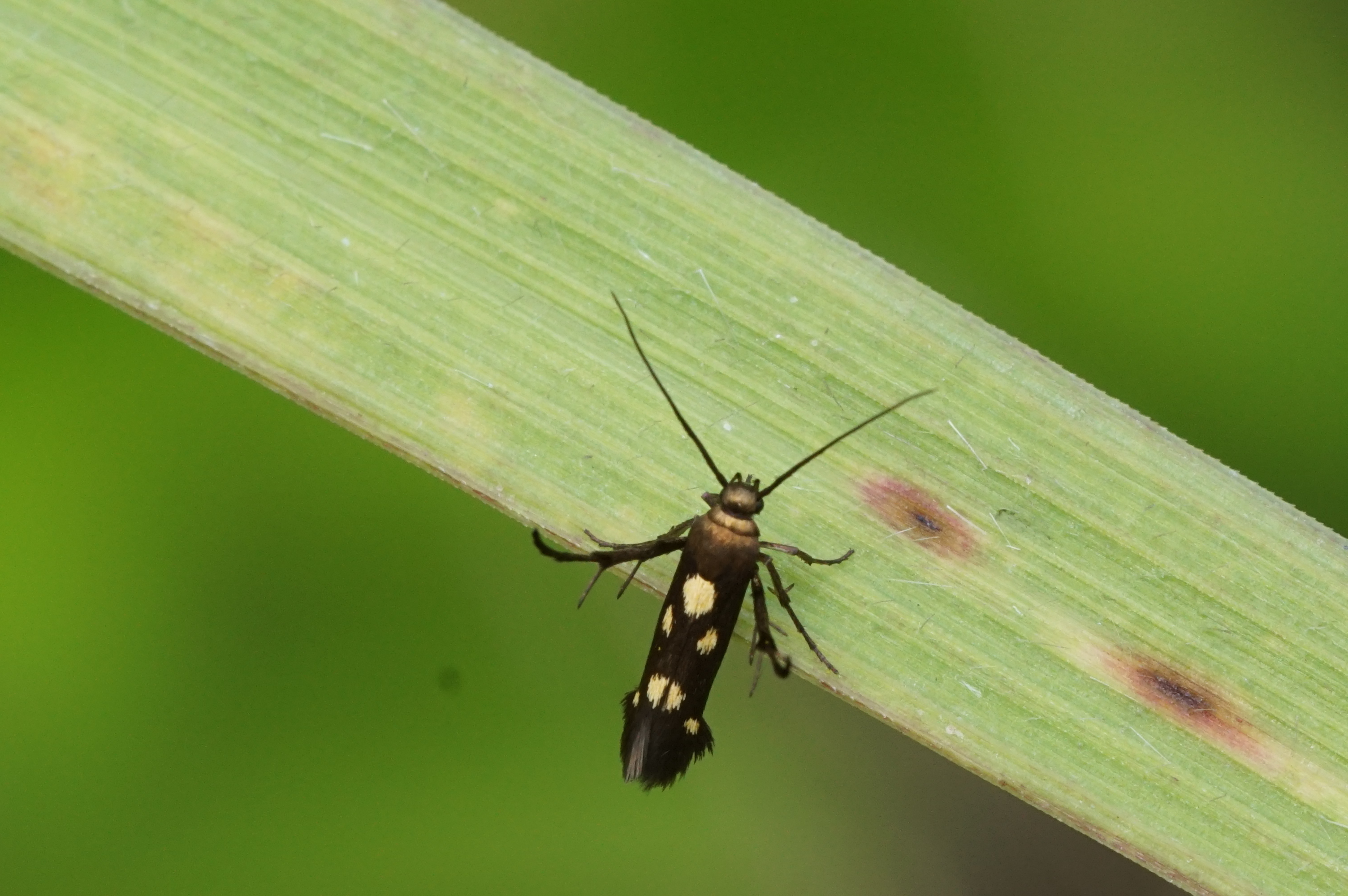

Scientific classification
- Kingdom: Animalia
- Phylum: Arthropoda
- Class: Insecta
- Order: Lepidoptera
- Family: Scythrididae
- Genus: Eretmocera
- Species: E. impactella

Binomial name
- Eretmocera impactella (Walker, 1864)

Synonyms
- Gelechia impactella Walker, Walker, 1864

= Eretmocera impactella =

Species of moth

Eretmocera impactella is a moth of the family Scythrididae. This species is known from Oman, United Arab Emirates, India, Sri Lanka, Taiwan, Thailand, and Pakistan.

== Description ==
The forewings are blackish brown with more or less distinct whitish or white yellowish markings.

== Biology ==
The larvae feed on various Amaranthaceae species and other food plants. Adults are mainly seen during the daytime, and can be seen in mating pairs (joined tail-to-tail). The pair are unable to fly during mating, and so take turns walking (one backwards, the other forwards).

== Gallery ==
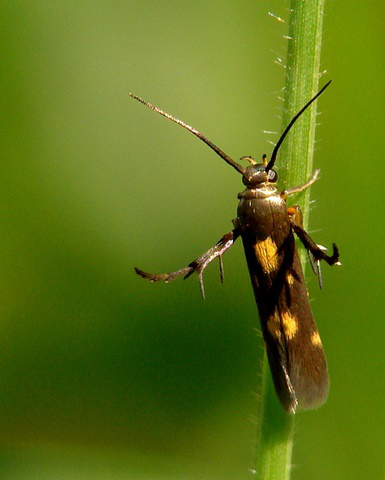
Top view, Kota, Karnataka, India

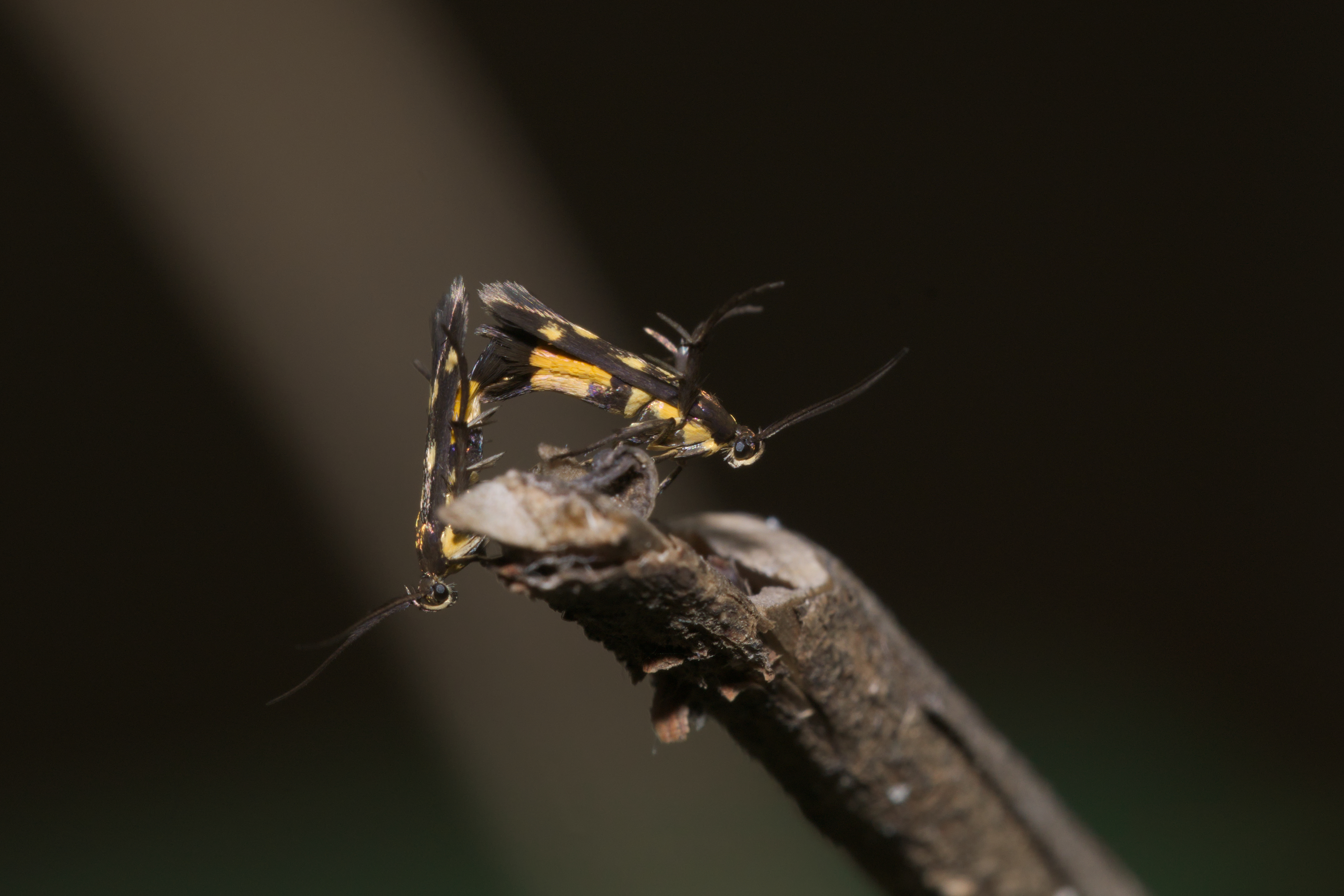
Mating pair, Kerala

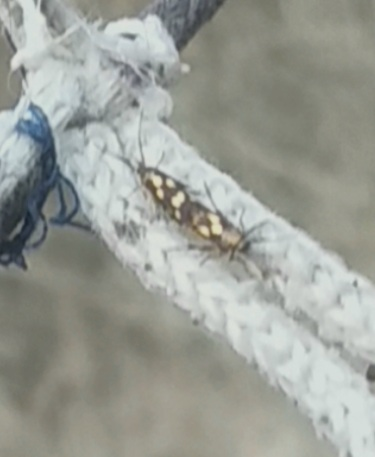
Top view of two mating,West Bengal
