= Eretmocera florifera =

Scientific classification
- Kingdom: Animalia
- Phylum: Arthropoda
- Clade: Pancrustacea
- Class: Insecta
- Order: Lepidoptera
- Family: Scythrididae
- Genus: Eretmocera
- Species: E. florifera

Binomial name
- Eretmocera florifera Meyrick, 1909

Species of moth

Eretmocera florifera is a moth of the family Scythrididae first described by Edward Meyrick in 1909. This species is known from South Africa.

Adults have been recorded in wing in October and December.
