= Fulvoclysia arguta =

Scientific classification
- Kingdom: Animalia
- Phylum: Arthropoda
- Class: Insecta
- Order: Lepidoptera
- Family: Tortricidae
- Genus: Fulvoclysia
- Species: F. arguta

Binomial name
- Fulvoclysia arguta Razowski, 1968

Species of moth

Fulvoclysia arguta is a species of moth of the family Tortricidae. It is found in Syria and Asia Minor.
