= Dicymolomia rufifusalis =

Scientific classification
- Kingdom: Animalia
- Phylum: Arthropoda
- Class: Insecta
- Order: Lepidoptera
- Family: Crambidae
- Genus: Dicymolomia
- Species: D. rufifusalis

Binomial name
- Dicymolomia rufifusalis (Hampson, 1912)

Synonyms
- Symphysa rufifusalis Hampson, 1912; Dicymolomia rufifuscalis

Species of moth

Dicymolomia rufifusalis is a moth in the family Crambidae. It was described by George Hampson in 1912. It is found in Panama.
