= Eretmocera percnophanes =

Scientific classification
- Kingdom: Animalia
- Phylum: Arthropoda
- Class: Insecta
- Order: Lepidoptera
- Family: Scythrididae
- Genus: Eretmocera
- Species: E. percnophanes

Binomial name
- Eretmocera percnophanes Meyrick, 1929

Species of moth

Eretmocera percnophanes is a moth of the family Scythrididae. It was described by Edward Meyrick in 1929. It is found in the Philippines (Samar).

The wingspan is about 13 mm. The forewings are dark purple-blue-fuscous and the hindwings are dark coppery-fuscous.
