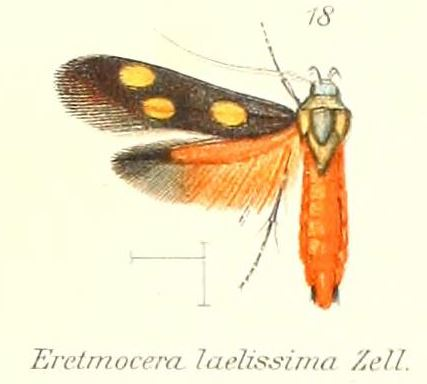

Scientific classification
- Kingdom: Animalia
- Phylum: Arthropoda
- Clade: Pancrustacea
- Class: Insecta
- Order: Lepidoptera
- Family: Scythrididae
- Genus: Eretmocera
- Species: E. laetissima

Binomial name
- Eretmocera laetissima Zeller, 1852

Synonyms
- Exodomorpha divisella Walker, Walker, 1864

= Eretmocera laetissima =

Species of moth

Eretmocera laetissima is a moth of the family Scythrididae. This species is known from Gambia, Congo, Comoros, Madagascar, Sierra Leone and South Africa.

== Biology ==
The larvae feed on Alternanthera achyrantoides (Amaranthaceae) and Clerodendrum sp. (Verbenaceae).
