= Fulvoclysia aulica =

Scientific classification
- Kingdom: Animalia
- Phylum: Arthropoda
- Class: Insecta
- Order: Lepidoptera
- Family: Tortricidae
- Genus: Fulvoclysia
- Species: F. aulica

Binomial name
- Fulvoclysia aulica Razowski, 1968

Species of moth

Fulvoclysia aulica is a species of moth of the family Tortricidae. It is found in Armenia and Turkey.
