= Eretmocera nomadica =

Scientific classification
- Kingdom: Animalia
- Phylum: Arthropoda
- Clade: Pancrustacea
- Class: Insecta
- Order: Lepidoptera
- Family: Scythrididae
- Genus: Eretmocera
- Species: E. nomadica

Binomial name
- Eretmocera nomadica Walsingham, 1907

Species of moth

Eretmocera nomadica is a moth of the family Scythrididae. It was described by Lord Walsingham in 1907. It is found in Algeria.

The wingspan is about 12 mm. The forewings are black, sprinkled with brown-grey scales, a pale pinkish ochreous spot on the costa at three-fourths from the base. The cilia are brownish grey. The hindwings are shining, pale grey, with a slight rosy tinge outwardly. The cilia are brown-grey.
