= Dicymolomia micropunctalis =

Scientific classification
- Domain: Eukaryota
- Kingdom: Animalia
- Phylum: Arthropoda
- Class: Insecta
- Order: Lepidoptera
- Family: Crambidae
- Genus: Dicymolomia
- Species: D. micropunctalis

Binomial name
- Dicymolomia micropunctalis Munroe, 1964

Species of moth

Dicymolomia micropunctalis is a moth in the family Crambidae. It is found in North America, where it has been recorded from California.
