= Bagdadia salicicola =

Scientific classification
- Kingdom: Animalia
- Phylum: Arthropoda
- Clade: Pancrustacea
- Class: Insecta
- Order: Lepidoptera
- Family: Gelechiidae
- Genus: Bagdadia
- Species: B. salicicola

Binomial name
- Bagdadia salicicola (Park, 1995)

Synonyms
- Hypatima salicicola Park, 1995; Capidentalia salicicola

Species of moth

Bagdadia salicicola is a moth in the family Gelechiidae. It was described by Kyu-Tek Park in 1995. It is found in Taiwan, Japan and Hainan, China.

The length of the forewings is 3.9 mm for males and 4.4 mm for females. The forewings are greyish orange. There are four fuscous marks on the costa. The hindwings are pale brownish grey.

The larvae feed on Salix species.
