= Scrobipalpa amseli =

Scientific classification
- Kingdom: Animalia
- Phylum: Arthropoda
- Clade: Pancrustacea
- Class: Insecta
- Order: Lepidoptera
- Family: Gelechiidae
- Genus: Scrobipalpa
- Species: S. amseli

Binomial name
- Scrobipalpa amseli Povolný, 1966

Species of moth

Scrobipalpa amseli is a moth in the family Gelechiidae. It was described by Dalibor Povolný in 1966. It is named for Hans Georg Amsel, who collected the type series. It is found in southern France and Spain.

The length of the forewings is about 5 mm (0.20 in).
