= Fulvoclysia forsteri =

Scientific classification
- Domain: Eukaryota
- Kingdom: Animalia
- Phylum: Arthropoda
- Class: Insecta
- Order: Lepidoptera
- Family: Tortricidae
- Genus: Fulvoclysia
- Species: F. forsteri

Binomial name
- Fulvoclysia forsteri (Osthelder, 1938)

Synonyms
- Euxanthis forsteri Osthelder, 1938

Species of moth

Fulvoclysia forsteri is a species of moth of the family Tortricidae. It is found in the Elburz Mountains of northern Iran.
