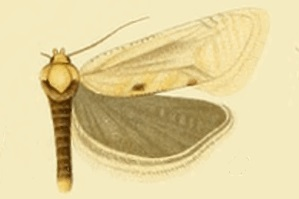

Scientific classification
- Domain: Eukaryota
- Kingdom: Animalia
- Phylum: Arthropoda
- Class: Insecta
- Order: Lepidoptera
- Family: Tortricidae
- Genus: Fulvoclysia
- Species: F. dictyodana

Binomial name
- Fulvoclysia dictyodana (Staudinger, 1880)

Synonyms
- Cochylis dictyodana Staudinger, 1880; Phalonia acutana Kennel, 1913; Cochylis dictyodana ab. insignatana Staudinger, 1880

= Fulvoclysia dictyodana =

Species of moth

Fulvoclysia dictyodana is a species of moth of the family Tortricidae. It is found in Romania, Slovakia, Turkey and the Caucasus.
