= Dicymolomia grisea =

Scientific classification
- Domain: Eukaryota
- Kingdom: Animalia
- Phylum: Arthropoda
- Class: Insecta
- Order: Lepidoptera
- Family: Crambidae
- Genus: Dicymolomia
- Species: D. grisea

Binomial name
- Dicymolomia grisea Munroe, 1964

Species of moth

Dicymolomia grisea is a moth in the family Crambidae. It is found in North America, where it has been recorded from southern Texas to Florida and South Carolina.

Adults are on wing from January to August and from October to December in Florida and from March to June and in November in Texas.
