= Eretmocera aurovittata =

Scientific classification
- Domain: Eukaryota
- Kingdom: Animalia
- Phylum: Arthropoda
- Class: Insecta
- Order: Lepidoptera
- Family: Scythrididae
- Genus: Eretmocera
- Species: E. aurovittata

Binomial name
- Eretmocera aurovittata Pagenstecher, 1900

Species of moth

Eretmocera aurovittata is a moth of the family Scythrididae. It was described by Arnold Pagenstecher in 1900. It is found on the Bismarck Islands.
