= Eretmocera arabica =

Scientific classification
- Domain: Eukaryota
- Kingdom: Animalia
- Phylum: Arthropoda
- Class: Insecta
- Order: Lepidoptera
- Family: Scythrididae
- Genus: Eretmocera
- Species: E. arabica

Binomial name
- Eretmocera arabica Amsel, 1961

Species of moth

Eretmocera arabica is a moth of the family Scythrididae. It was described by Hans Georg Amsel in 1961. It is found in Yemen.
