= Eretmocera rubripennis =

Scientific classification
- Kingdom: Animalia
- Phylum: Arthropoda
- Class: Insecta
- Order: Lepidoptera
- Family: Scythrididae
- Genus: Eretmocera
- Species: E. rubripennis

Binomial name
- Eretmocera rubripennis Meyrick, 1915

Species of moth

Eretmocera rubripennis is a moth of the family Scythrididae. It was described by Edward Meyrick in 1915. It is found in southern India.

The wingspan is 11–12 mm. The forewings are glossy rather dark bronzy-grey, sometimes with some whitish-ochreous suffusion on the fold at one-third of the wing, as well as a cloudy whitish-ochreous spot on the costa at three-fourths, and another on the dorsum towards the tornus obliquely before it. The hindwings are light rose-pink, the apex and sometimes the upper part of the terminal edge dark grey.
