= Bagdadia eucalla =

Scientific classification
- Domain: Eukaryota
- Kingdom: Animalia
- Phylum: Arthropoda
- Class: Insecta
- Order: Lepidoptera
- Family: Gelechiidae
- Genus: Bagdadia
- Species: B. eucalla

Binomial name
- Bagdadia eucalla (H.-H. Li & Z.-M. Zheng, 1998)

Synonyms
- Capidentalia eucalla H.-H. Li & Z.-M. Zheng, 1998

Species of moth

Bagdadia eucalla is a moth in the family Gelechiidae. It was described by Hou-Hun Li and Zhe-Min Zheng in 1998. It is found in Korea and China (Shaanxi, Guizhou) and Japan.

The length of the forewings is 3.6-8.8 mm for males and 3.8 mm for females.
