= Eretmocera dorsistrigata =

Scientific classification
- Kingdom: Animalia
- Phylum: Arthropoda
- Class: Insecta
- Order: Lepidoptera
- Family: Scythrididae
- Genus: Eretmocera
- Species: E. dorsistrigata

Binomial name
- Eretmocera dorsistrigata Walsingham, 1889

Species of moth

Eretmocera dorsistrigata is a moth of the family Scythrididae. It was described by Baron Walsingham in 1889. It is found in Tanzania (Zanzibar).
