= Oedematopoda cypris =

Scientific classification
- Kingdom: Animalia
- Phylum: Arthropoda
- Class: Insecta
- Order: Lepidoptera
- Family: Stathmopodidae
- Genus: Oedematopoda
- Species: O. cypris

Binomial name
- Oedematopoda cypris Meyrick, 1905

Species of moth

Oedematopoda cypris is a moth in the family Stathmopodidae. It is found in India and Sri Lanka.
