= Eretmocera letabensis =

Scientific classification
- Kingdom: Animalia
- Phylum: Arthropoda
- Clade: Pancrustacea
- Class: Insecta
- Order: Lepidoptera
- Family: Scythrididae
- Genus: Eretmocera
- Species: E. letabensis

Binomial name
- Eretmocera letabensis Bengtsson, 2014

Species of moth

Eretmocera letabensis is a moth of the family Scythrididae. It was described by Bengt Å. Bengtsson in 2014. It is found in Namibia and South Africa (Limpopo).
