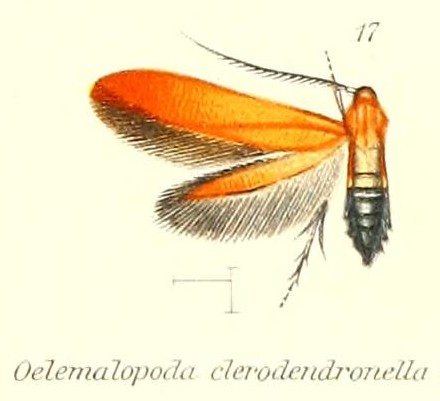
- Oedematopoda clerodendronella

Scientific classification
- Kingdom: Animalia
- Phylum: Arthropoda
- Clade: Pancrustacea
- Class: Insecta
- Order: Lepidoptera
- Family: Stathmopodidae
- Genus: Oedematopoda; Zeller, 1852

= Oedematopoda =

Genus of moths

Oedematopoda is a genus of moths in the family Stathmopodidae. This genus is closely related to the genus Atkinsonia and difficult to differentiate externally.

== Species ==
- Oedematopoda beijingana Yang, 1977
- Oedematopoda bicoloricornis Strand, 1913
- Oedematopoda butalistis Strand, 1917
- Oedematopoda clerodendronella (Stainton, 1859)
- Oedematopoda cypris Meyrick, 1905
- Oedematopoda flammifera Meyrick, 1915
- Oedematopoda ignipicta (Butler, 1881)
- Oedematopoda illucens (Meyrick, 1914)
- Oedematopoda leechi Walsingham, 1889
- Oedematopoda nohirai Matsumura, 1931
- Oedematopoda princeps (Zeller, 1852)
- Oedematopoda pyromyia Meyrick, 1929
- Oedematopoda semirubra Meyrick, 1936
- Oedematopoda venusta (Meyrick, 1913)
