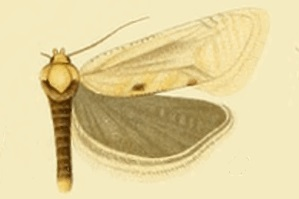
- Fulvoclysia dictyodana

Scientific classification
- Domain: Eukaryota
- Kingdom: Animalia
- Phylum: Arthropoda
- Class: Insecta
- Order: Lepidoptera
- Family: Tortricidae
- Tribe: Cochylini
- Genus: Fulvoclysia; Obraztsov, 1943

= Fulvoclysia =

Genus of tortrix moths

Fulvoclysia is a genus of moths belonging to the family Tortricidae.

== Species ==
- Fulvoclysia albertii Razowski, 1983
- Fulvoclysia arguta Razowski, 1968
- Fulvoclysia aulica Razowski, 1968
- Fulvoclysia defectana (Lederer, 1870)
- Fulvoclysia dictyodana (Staudinger, 1880)
- Fulvoclysia forsteri (Osthelder, 1938)
- Fulvoclysia nerminae Kocak, 1982
- Fulvoclysia pallorana (Lederer, 1864)
- Fulvoclysia proxima Razowski, 1970
- Fulvoclysia rjabovi Kuznetzov, 1976
- Fulvoclysia subdolana (Kennel, 1901)

== See also ==
- List of Tortricidae genera
