= Bagdadia cymoptila =

Scientific classification
- Kingdom: Animalia
- Phylum: Arthropoda
- Class: Insecta
- Order: Lepidoptera
- Family: Gelechiidae
- Genus: Bagdadia
- Species: B. cymoptila

Binomial name
- Bagdadia cymoptila (Meyrick, 1929)

Synonyms
- Chelaria cymoptila Meyrick, 1929; Hypatima cymoptila; Capidentalia cymoptila

Species of moth

Bagdadia cymoptila is a moth in the family Gelechiidae. It was described by Edward Meyrick in 1929. It is found in southern India.

The wingspan is 10–13 mm.
