= Eretmocera basistrigata =

Scientific classification
- Kingdom: Animalia
- Phylum: Arthropoda
- Class: Insecta
- Order: Lepidoptera
- Family: Scythrididae
- Genus: Eretmocera
- Species: E. basistrigata

Binomial name
- Eretmocera basistrigata Walsingham, 1889

Species of moth

Eretmocera basistrigata is a moth of the family Scythrididae. It was described by Baron Walsingham in 1889. It is found in Cape Verde, Gambia, Kenya and Namibia.

The larvae feed on Clerodendrum species.
