= Fulvoclysia proxima =

Scientific classification
- Kingdom: Animalia
- Phylum: Arthropoda
- Class: Insecta
- Order: Lepidoptera
- Family: Tortricidae
- Genus: Fulvoclysia
- Species: F. proxima

Binomial name
- Fulvoclysia proxima Razowski, 1970

Species of moth

Fulvoclysia proxima is a species of moth of the family Tortricidae. It is found in Turkey.
