= Eretmocera thephagones =

Scientific classification
- Domain: Eukaryota
- Kingdom: Animalia
- Phylum: Arthropoda
- Class: Insecta
- Order: Lepidoptera
- Family: Scythrididae
- Genus: Eretmocera
- Species: E. thephagones

Binomial name
- Eretmocera thephagones van Gijen, 1912

Species of moth

Eretmocera thephagones is a moth of the family Scythrididae. It was described by Klunder van Gijen in 1912. It is found on Java, an island in Indonesia.

The wingspan is about 14 mm (0.55 in). The fore- and hindwings are black and yellow.
