= Eretmocera cyanosoma =

Scientific classification
- Kingdom: Animalia
- Phylum: Arthropoda
- Class: Insecta
- Order: Lepidoptera
- Family: Scythrididae
- Genus: Eretmocera
- Species: E. cyanosoma

Binomial name
- Eretmocera cyanosoma Meyrick, 1910

Species of moth

Eretmocera cyanosoma is a moth of the family Scythrididae. It was described by Edward Meyrick in 1910. It is found on Sumba and Java.

The wingspan is about 12 mm (0.47 in).

The larvae have been recorded feeding on Amaranthus species.
