= Eretmocera monophaea =

Scientific classification
- Kingdom: Animalia
- Phylum: Arthropoda
- Class: Insecta
- Order: Lepidoptera
- Family: Scythrididae
- Genus: Eretmocera
- Species: E. monophaea

Binomial name
- Eretmocera monophaea Meyrick, 1927

Species of moth

Eretmocera monophaea is a moth of the family Scythrididae. It was described by Edward Meyrick in 1927. It is found in Namibia and South Africa (KwaZulu-Natal).

The wingspan is about 10 mm. The forewings are dark fuscous, suffusedly and irregularly clouded grey with a faint pinkish tinge, sometimes with a whitish spot on the costa al three-fourths and with some whitish scales near the apex. The hindwings are grey.
