= Fulvoclysia nerminae =

Scientific classification
- Kingdom: Animalia
- Phylum: Arthropoda
- Class: Insecta
- Order: Lepidoptera
- Family: Tortricidae
- Genus: Fulvoclysia
- Species: F. nerminae

Binomial name
- Fulvoclysia nerminae Kocak, 1982

Synonyms
- Tortrix fulvana Fischer von Roslerstamm, 1834

Species of moth

Fulvoclysia nerminae is a species of moth of the family Tortricidae. It is found in Russia, Asia Minor and most of Europe.

The wingspan is 21–27 mm. Adults have been recorded on wing from June to July in one generation per year.

The larvae feed within the stem and roots of Scabiosa species. The species overwinters in the larval stage.
