= Bagdadia irakella =

Scientific classification
- Domain: Eukaryota
- Kingdom: Animalia
- Phylum: Arthropoda
- Class: Insecta
- Order: Lepidoptera
- Family: Gelechiidae
- Genus: Bagdadia
- Species: B. irakella

Binomial name
- Bagdadia irakella Amsel, 1949

Species of moth

Bagdadia irakella is a moth in the family Gelechiidae. It was described by Hans Georg Amsel in 1949. It is found in Iraq.
