= Fulvoclysia defectana =

Scientific classification
- Domain: Eukaryota
- Kingdom: Animalia
- Phylum: Arthropoda
- Class: Insecta
- Order: Lepidoptera
- Family: Tortricidae
- Genus: Fulvoclysia
- Species: F. defectana

Binomial name
- Fulvoclysia defectana (Lederer, 1870)

Synonyms
- Conchylis defectana Lederer, 1870

Species of moth

Fulvoclysia defectana is a species of moth of the family Tortricidae. It is found in Russia (Transcaucasia) and Turkey.
