= Eretmocera shoabensis =

Scientific classification
- Domain: Eukaryota
- Kingdom: Animalia
- Phylum: Arthropoda
- Class: Insecta
- Order: Lepidoptera
- Family: Scythrididae
- Genus: Eretmocera
- Species: E. shoabensis

Binomial name
- Eretmocera shoabensis Rebel, 1907

Moth species endemic to Socotra, Yemen

Eretmocera shoabensis is a species of moth in the family Scythrididae. It was first described by Austrian entomologist Hans Rebel in 1907. This species is endemic to the island of Socotra, part of Yemen.

The larvae feed on plants of the genus Statice (family Plumbaginaceae).
