= Eretmocera contermina =

Scientific classification
- Kingdom: Animalia
- Phylum: Arthropoda
- Class: Insecta
- Order: Lepidoptera
- Family: Scythrididae
- Genus: Eretmocera
- Species: E. contermina

Binomial name
- Eretmocera contermina Meyrick, 1926

Species of moth

Eretmocera contermina is a moth of the family Scythrididae. It was described by Edward Meyrick in 1926. It is found in Namibia and South Africa (Gauteng).

The wingspan is 10–11 mm. Adults have been recorded on wing in December and March.
