= Eretmocera jemensis =

Scientific classification
- Domain: Eukaryota
- Kingdom: Animalia
- Phylum: Arthropoda
- Class: Insecta
- Order: Lepidoptera
- Family: Scythrididae
- Genus: Eretmocera
- Species: E. jemensis

Binomial name
- Eretmocera jemensis Rebel, 1930

Species of moth

Eretmocera jemensis is a moth of the family Scythrididae. It was described by Hans Rebel in 1930. It is found in Yemen.
