= Eretmocera typhonica =

Scientific classification
- Kingdom: Animalia
- Phylum: Arthropoda
- Class: Insecta
- Order: Lepidoptera
- Family: Scythrididae
- Genus: Eretmocera
- Species: E. typhonica

Binomial name
- Eretmocera typhonica Meyrick, 1917

Species of moth

Eretmocera typhonica is a moth of the family Scythrididae. It was described by Edward Meyrick in 1917. It is found in Cameroon and Côte d'Ivoire.

The wingspan is about 12 mm. The forewings are deep purple, with blue-green reflections. The hindwings are dark bronzy-fuscous, but lighter anteriorly.
