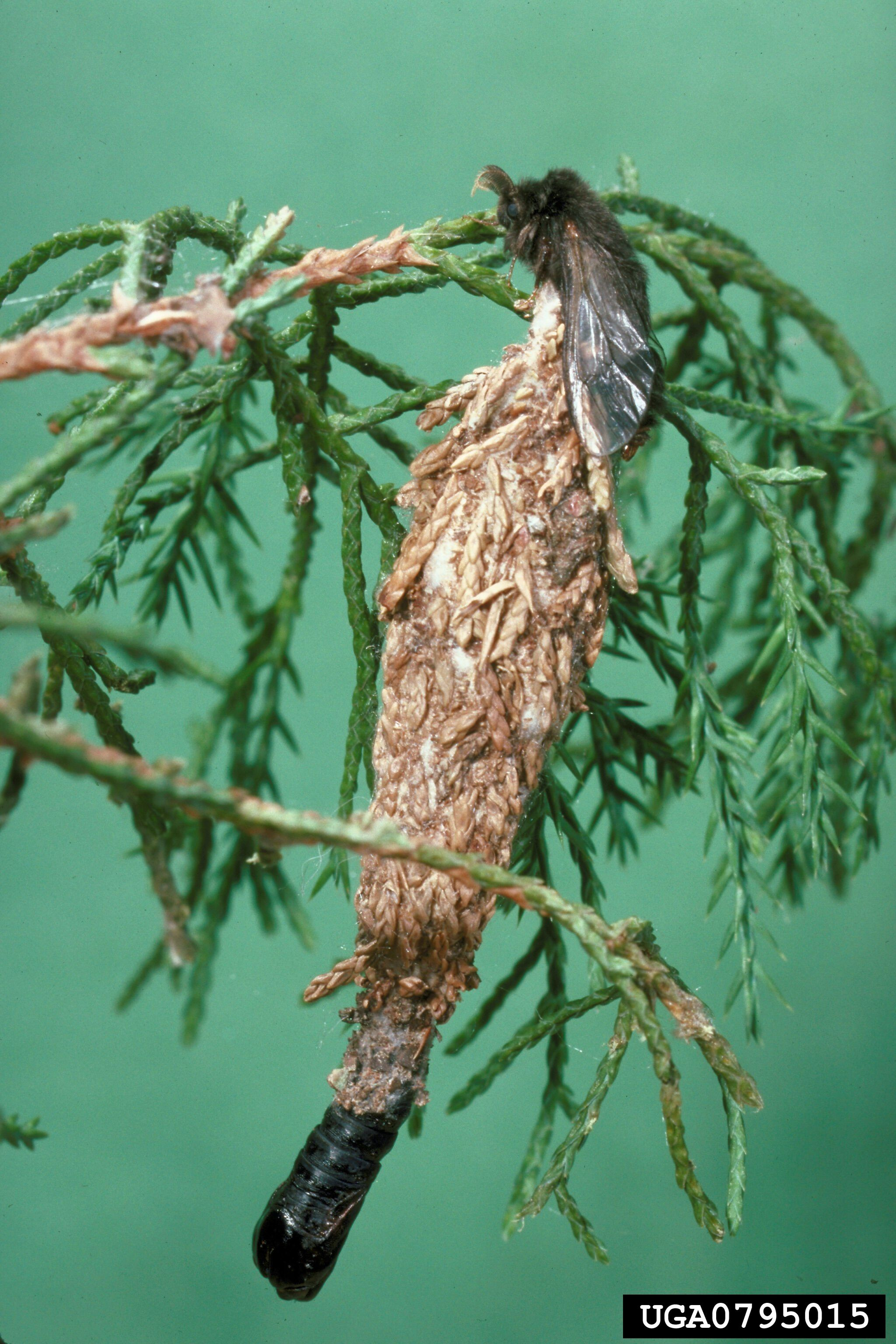
- Evergreen bagworm (Thyridopteryx ephemeraeformis)

Scientific classification
- Domain: Eukaryota
- Kingdom: Animalia
- Phylum: Arthropoda
- Class: Insecta
- Order: Lepidoptera
- Family: Psychidae
- Tribe: Acanthopsychini
- Genus: Thyridopteryx; Stephens, 1835

Species
- See text

= Thyridopteryx =

Genus of moths

Thyridopteryx is a genus of bagworm moth.

== Species ==
- T. alcora
- T. davidsoni
- T. ephemeraeformis
- T. meadii
- T. rileyi
