= Eretmocera benitonis =

Scientific classification
- Kingdom: Animalia
- Phylum: Arthropoda
- Class: Insecta
- Order: Lepidoptera
- Family: Scythrididae
- Genus: Eretmocera
- Species: E. benitonis

Binomial name
- Eretmocera benitonis Strand, 1913

Species of moth

Eretmocera benitonis is a moth of the family Scythrididae. It was described by Strand in 1913. It is found in Equatorial Guinea.

The length of the forewings is about 5.3 mm. Adults have been recorded on wing in August.
