= Bagdadia claviformis =

Scientific classification
- Kingdom: Animalia
- Phylum: Arthropoda
- Clade: Pancrustacea
- Class: Insecta
- Order: Lepidoptera
- Family: Gelechiidae
- Genus: Bagdadia
- Species: B. claviformis

Binomial name
- Bagdadia claviformis (Park, 1993)

Synonyms
- Hypatima claviformis Park, 1993; Capidentalia claviformis

Species of moth

Bagdadia claviformis is a moth in the family Gelechiidae. It was described by Kyu-Tek Park in 1993. It is found in the China (Anhui, Gansu, Hainan, Henan, Shaanxi), the Russian Far East, Korea and Japan.

The wingspan is 10–11.5 mm.
