= Fulvoclysia pallorana =

Scientific classification
- Domain: Eukaryota
- Kingdom: Animalia
- Phylum: Arthropoda
- Class: Insecta
- Order: Lepidoptera
- Family: Tortricidae
- Genus: Fulvoclysia
- Species: F. pallorana

Binomial name
- Fulvoclysia pallorana (Lederer, 1864)

Synonyms
- Conchylis pallorana Lederer, 1864; Fulvoclysia armeniaca Obraztsov, 1943

Species of moth

Fulvoclysia pallorana is a species of moth of the family Tortricidae. It is found in the Caucasus, Armenia and Asia Minor.
