= Fulvoclysia rjabovi =

Scientific classification
- Domain: Eukaryota
- Kingdom: Animalia
- Phylum: Arthropoda
- Class: Insecta
- Order: Lepidoptera
- Family: Tortricidae
- Genus: Fulvoclysia
- Species: F. rjabovi

Binomial name
- Fulvoclysia rjabovi Kuznetzov, 1976

Species of moth

Fulvoclysia rjabovi is a species of moth of the family Tortricidae. It is found in Armenia and Iran.
