= Eretmocera microbarbara =

Scientific classification
- Kingdom: Animalia
- Phylum: Arthropoda
- Clade: Pancrustacea
- Class: Insecta
- Order: Lepidoptera
- Family: Scythrididae
- Genus: Eretmocera
- Species: E. microbarbara

Binomial name
- Eretmocera microbarbara Walsingham, 1907

Species of moth

Eretmocera microbarbara is a moth of the family Scythrididae. It was described by Baron Walsingham in 1907. It is found in Algeria.

The wingspan is about 10 mm. The forewings are brownish fuscous, sprinkled and mottled with pale greyish ochreous, which has a tendency to form an irregular fascia before the middle and an oblique transverse band before the apex, more distinctly visible on the costa than below it. A few long greyish ochreous scales project into the brownish fuscous cilia, but the amount of such scaling there and on the wing-surface is variable. The hindwings are slightly paler than the forewings, pale brownish fuscous, with darker brownish fuscous cilia.
