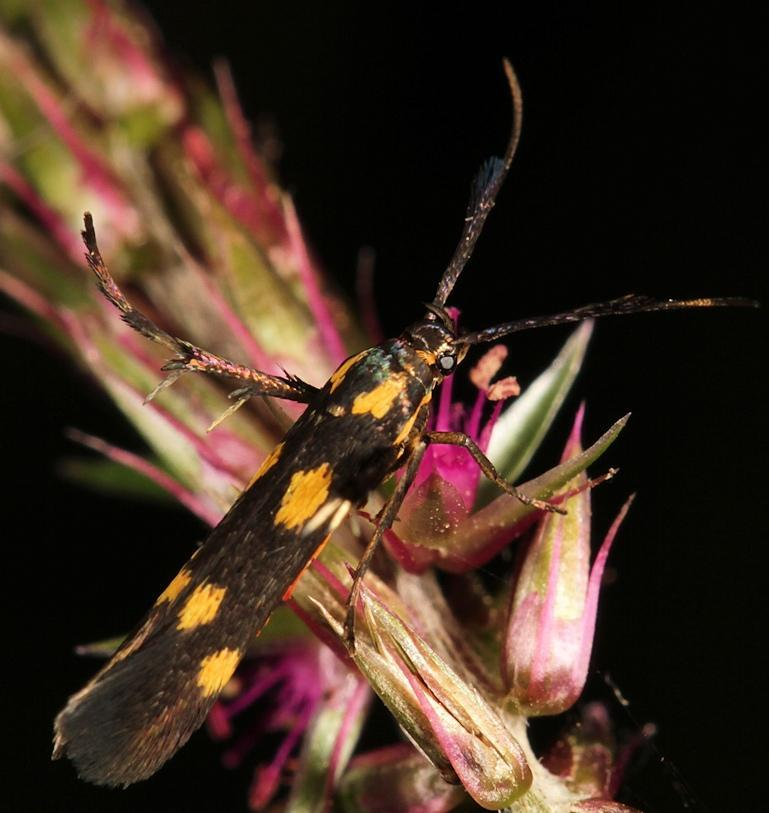

Scientific classification
- Kingdom: Animalia
- Phylum: Arthropoda
- Class: Insecta
- Order: Lepidoptera
- Family: Scythrididae
- Genus: Eretmocera
- Species: E. syleuta

Binomial name
- Eretmocera syleuta Meyrick, 1926

= Eretmocera syleuta =

Species of moth

Eretmocera syleuta is a moth of the family Scythrididae. It was described by Edward Meyrick in 1926. It is found in South Africa (Western Cape).
