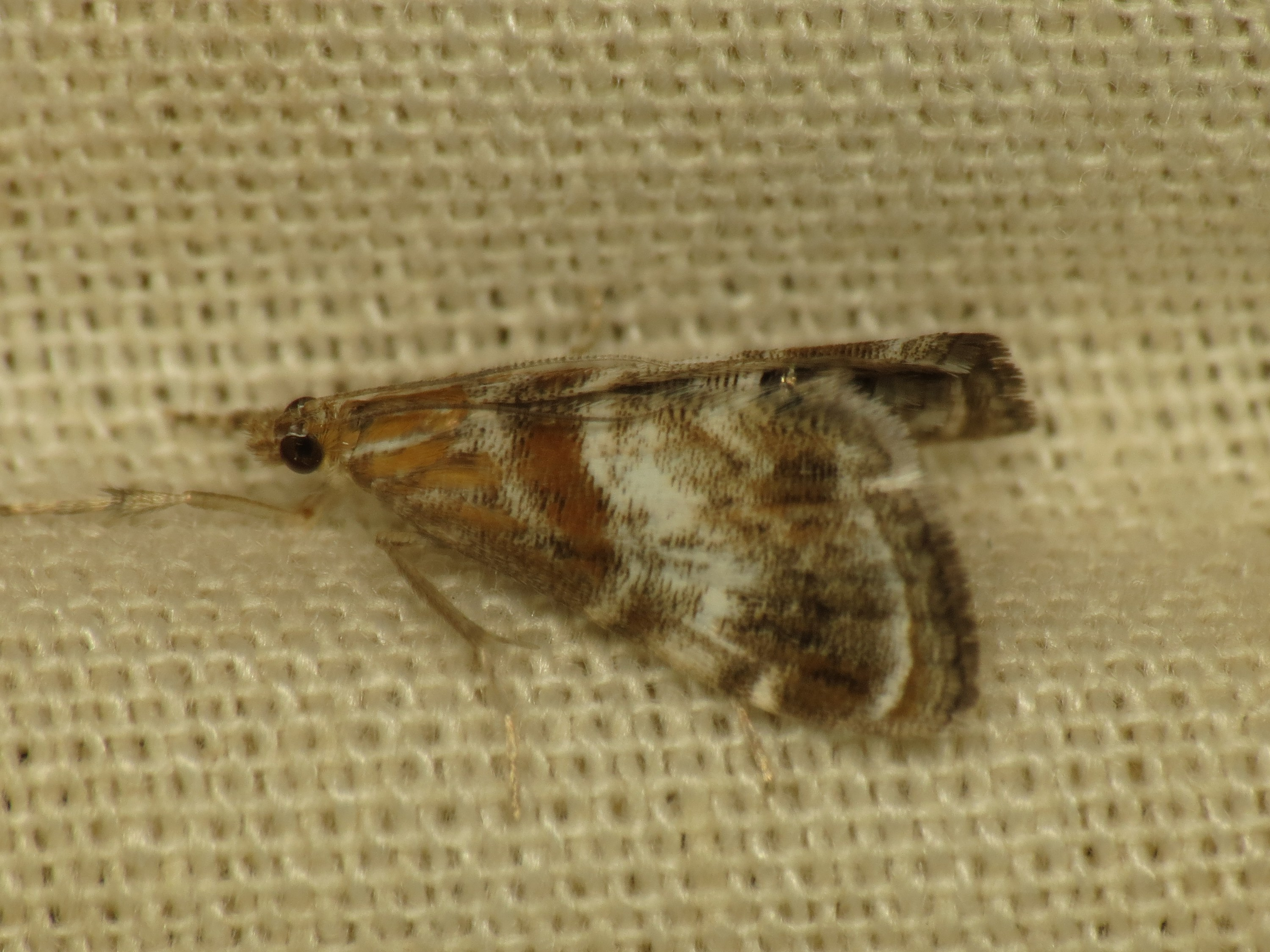

Scientific classification
- Kingdom: Animalia
- Phylum: Arthropoda
- Clade: Pancrustacea
- Class: Insecta
- Order: Lepidoptera
- Family: Crambidae
- Genus: Dicymolomia
- Species: D. metalliferalis

Binomial name
- Dicymolomia metalliferalis (Packard, 1873)

Synonyms
- Calaclysta metalliferalis Packard, 1873; Dicymolomia sauberi Hedemann, 1883

= Dicymolomia metalliferalis =

Species of moth

Dicymolomia metalliferalis is a moth of the family Crambidae described by Alpheus Spring Packard in 1873. It is found in western North America, from southern Vancouver Island and Washington through Oregon to California and western Arizona.

The wingspan is about 16 mm.

The larvae have been recorded feeding on decaying seed pods of Lupinus species (L. albifrons and L. latifolius).
