= Eretmocera agassizi =

Scientific classification
- Kingdom: Animalia
- Phylum: Arthropoda
- Clade: Pancrustacea
- Class: Insecta
- Order: Lepidoptera
- Family: Scythrididae
- Genus: Eretmocera
- Species: E. agassizi

Binomial name
- Eretmocera agassizi Bengtsson, 2014

Species of moth

Eretmocera agassizi is a moth of the family Scythrididae. It was described by Bengt Å. Bengtsson in 2014. It is found in Kenya (Rift Valley).

The wingspan is 11–13 mm.
