= Eretmocera bradleyi =

Scientific classification
- Kingdom: Animalia
- Phylum: Arthropoda
- Class: Insecta
- Order: Lepidoptera
- Family: Scythrididae
- Genus: Eretmocera
- Species: E. bradleyi

Binomial name
- Eretmocera bradleyi Amsel, 1961

Species of moth

Eretmocera bradleyi is a moth of the family Scythrididae. It was described by Hans Georg Amsel in 1961. It is found in the United Arab Emirates and Yemen.

Adults have been recorded on wing in February.
