= Bagdadia tricornis =

Scientific classification
- Domain: Eukaryota
- Kingdom: Animalia
- Phylum: Arthropoda
- Class: Insecta
- Order: Lepidoptera
- Family: Gelechiidae
- Genus: Bagdadia
- Species: B. tricornis

Binomial name
- Bagdadia tricornis Yang & Li, 2015

Species of moth

Bagdadia tricornis is a moth in the family Gelechiidae. It was described by Yang and Li in 2015. It is found in China (Hainan).

The wingspan is 8−10 mm.

== Etymology ==
The species name refers to the process of the valve and is derived from Latin tricornis (meaning triangular).
