= Dicymolomia diminutalis =

Scientific classification
- Domain: Eukaryota
- Kingdom: Animalia
- Phylum: Arthropoda
- Class: Insecta
- Order: Lepidoptera
- Family: Crambidae
- Genus: Dicymolomia
- Species: D. diminutalis

Binomial name
- Dicymolomia diminutalis Warren, 1891

Species of moth

Dicymolomia diminutalis is a moth in the family Crambidae. It is found in Peru.
