= Bagdadia paroctas =

Scientific classification
- Kingdom: Animalia
- Phylum: Arthropoda
- Class: Insecta
- Order: Lepidoptera
- Family: Gelechiidae
- Genus: Bagdadia
- Species: B. paroctas

Binomial name
- Bagdadia paroctas (Meyrick, 1913)

Synonyms
- Chelaria paroctas Meyrick, 1913; Hypatima paroctas; Capidentalia paroctas

Species of moth

Bagdadia paroctas is a moth in the family Gelechiidae. It was described by Edward Meyrick in 1913. It is found in China (Zhejiang), Vietnam, Sri Lanka, India's Andaman Islands and Java, Indonesia.

The wingspan is 13–14 mm. The forewings are grey, irrorated (sprinkled) with whitish and with a series of small ochreous-brown spots mixed with black along the costa, one before the middle rather larger. There is an ochreous-brown spot beneath the costa near the base, and some blackish irroration towards the base. A transverse series of three blackish marks is found at one-fifth, and another at one-fourth. An irregularly 8-shaped mark outlined with blackish is found in the disc at one-third, and another at two-thirds. There are some small ochreous-brownish spots between these, and a larger one in the disc beyond the second, as well as a blackish spot on the dorsum beneath the first, touching it. There is an ochreous-brown streak just before the termen, touching a terminal series of small blackish spots. The hindwings are grey, thinly scaled and subhyaline (almost glass like) anteriorly, with the veins and termen dark fuscous.
