= Bagdadia gnomia =

Scientific classification
- Kingdom: Animalia
- Phylum: Arthropoda
- Class: Insecta
- Order: Lepidoptera
- Family: Gelechiidae
- Genus: Bagdadia
- Species: B. gnomia

Binomial name
- Bagdadia gnomia (Ponomarenko, 1995)

Synonyms
- Capidentalia gnomia Ponomarenko, 1995

Species of moth

Bagdadia gnomia is a moth in the family Gelechiidae. It was described by Ponomarenko in 1995. It is found in the Russian Far East.
