= Eretmocera homalocrossa =

Scientific classification
- Kingdom: Animalia
- Phylum: Arthropoda
- Class: Insecta
- Order: Lepidoptera
- Family: Scythrididae
- Genus: Eretmocera
- Species: E. homalocrossa

Binomial name
- Eretmocera homalocrossa Meyrick, 1930

Species of moth

Eretmocera homalocrossa is a moth of the family Scythrididae. It was described by Edward Meyrick in 1930. It is found in Uganda.

The wingspan is 11–12 mm. The forewings are purple blue-blackish and the hindwings are dark grey.

The larvae have been recorded feeding on Amaranthus caudatus.
