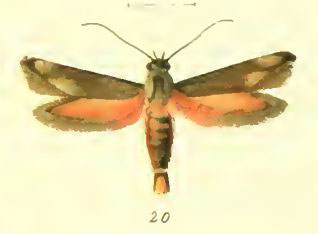

Scientific classification
- Domain: Eukaryota
- Kingdom: Animalia
- Phylum: Arthropoda
- Class: Insecta
- Order: Lepidoptera
- Family: Scythrididae
- Genus: Eretmocera
- Species: E. levicornella

Binomial name
- Eretmocera levicornella Rebel, 1917

= Eretmocera levicornella =

Species of moth

Eretmocera levicornella is a moth of the family Scythrididae. It was described by Hans Rebel in 1917. It is found in Sudan.
