= Bagdadia tugaella =

Scientific classification
- Kingdom: Animalia
- Phylum: Arthropoda
- Class: Insecta
- Order: Lepidoptera
- Family: Gelechiidae
- Genus: Bagdadia
- Species: B. tugaella

Binomial name
- Bagdadia tugaella (Ponomarenko, 1995)

Synonyms
- Capidentalia tugaella Ponomarenko, 1995

Species of moth

Bagdadia tugaella is a moth in the family Gelechiidae. It was described by Ponomarenko in 1995. It is found in Tajikistan.
