= Eretmocera haemogastra =

Scientific classification
- Kingdom: Animalia
- Phylum: Arthropoda
- Class: Insecta
- Order: Lepidoptera
- Family: Scythrididae
- Genus: Eretmocera
- Species: E. haemogastra

Binomial name
- Eretmocera haemogastra Meyrick, 1936

Species of moth

Eretmocera haemogastra is a moth of the family Scythrididae. It was described by Edward Meyrick in 1936. It is found in the Democratic Republic of the Congo (Equateur).

The larvae feed within the flowers of Coleus species.
