= Fulvoclysia albertii =

Scientific classification
- Kingdom: Animalia
- Phylum: Arthropoda
- Class: Insecta
- Order: Lepidoptera
- Family: Tortricidae
- Genus: Fulvoclysia
- Species: F. albertii

Binomial name
- Fulvoclysia albertii Razowski, 1983

Species of moth

Fulvoclysia albertii is a species of moth of the family Tortricidae. It is found in the north-western Caucasus in Russia.
