= Eretmocera scatospila =

Scientific classification
- Kingdom: Animalia
- Phylum: Arthropoda
- Clade: Pancrustacea
- Class: Insecta
- Order: Lepidoptera
- Family: Scythrididae
- Genus: Eretmocera
- Species: E. scatospila

Binomial name
- Eretmocera scatospila Zeller, 1852

Species of moth

Eretmocera scatospila is a moth of the family Scythrididae. It was described by Philipp Christoph Zeller in 1852. It is found in Botswana, Democratic Republic of Congo (Equateur, West Kasai, Bas Congo, Katanga, Orientale), Gambia, Ghana, Kenya, Namibia, Nigeria and South Africa (Limpopo, Gauteng, KwaZulu-Natal).

The larvae have been recorded feeding on Amaranthus viridis, Glycine max, Urena lobata, Gossypium, Thunbergia and Clerodendrum species.
