= Bagdadia salicicolella =

Scientific classification
- Domain: Eukaryota
- Kingdom: Animalia
- Phylum: Arthropoda
- Class: Insecta
- Order: Lepidoptera
- Family: Gelechiidae
- Genus: Bagdadia
- Species: B. salicicolella

Binomial name
- Bagdadia salicicolella (Kuznetsov, 1960)

Synonyms
- Nothris salicicolella Kuznetsov, 1960; Capidentalia salicicolella

Species of moth

Bagdadia salicicolella is a moth in the family Gelechiidae. It was described by Vladimir Ivanovitsch Kuznetsov in 1960. It is found in Turkmenistan.

The larvae feed on Salix species.
