= Eretmocera albistriata =

Scientific classification
- Domain: Eukaryota
- Kingdom: Animalia
- Phylum: Arthropoda
- Class: Insecta
- Order: Lepidoptera
- Family: Scythrididae
- Genus: Eretmocera
- Species: E. albistriata

Binomial name
- Eretmocera albistriata Legrand, 1966

Species of moth

Eretmocera albistriata is a moth of the family Scythrididae. It was described by Henry Legrand in 1966. It is found on the Seychelles (Aldabra).
