= Bagdadia khaoensis =

Scientific classification
- Kingdom: Animalia
- Phylum: Arthropoda
- Class: Insecta
- Order: Lepidoptera
- Family: Gelechiidae
- Genus: Bagdadia
- Species: B. khaoensis

Binomial name
- Bagdadia khaoensis (Park & Ponomarenko, 1999)

Synonyms
- Capidentalia khaoensis Park & Ponomarenko, 1999

Species of moth

Bagdadia khaoensis is a moth in the family Gelechiidae. It was described by Kyu-Tek Park and Margarita Gennadievna Ponomarenko in 1999. It is found in Thailand and Hainan, China.

The length of the forewings is 8-9.5 mm.

The larvae feed on Dimocarpus longan.
