= Eretmocera katangensis =

Scientific classification
- Kingdom: Animalia
- Phylum: Arthropoda
- Clade: Pancrustacea
- Class: Insecta
- Order: Lepidoptera
- Family: Scythrididae
- Genus: Eretmocera
- Species: E. katangensis

Binomial name
- Eretmocera katangensis Bengtsson, 2014

Species of moth

Eretmocera katangensis is a moth of the family Scythrididae. It was described by Bengt Å. Bengtsson in 2014. It is found in the Democratic Republic of the Congo (Katanga).
