= Eretmocera dioctis =

Scientific classification
- Kingdom: Animalia
- Phylum: Arthropoda
- Class: Insecta
- Order: Lepidoptera
- Family: Scythrididae
- Genus: Eretmocera
- Species: E. dioctis

Binomial name
- Eretmocera dioctis (Meyrick, 1897)

Synonyms
- Aeraula dioctis Meyrick, 1897; Eretmocera flavicincta Turner, 1913

Species of moth

Eretmocera dioctis is a moth of the family Scythrididae. It was described by Edward Meyrick in 1897. It is found in Australia, where it has been recorded from Queensland, New South Wales and Western Australia.

The wingspan is 9–11 mm. The forewings are fuscous, with a purplish lustre and a few whitish-ochreous scales, and sometimes with three indistinct whitish-ochreous spots, the first on the dorsum before the middle, second on the tornus and third (seldom developed) on the costa at four-fifths. The hindwings are dark grey.

The larvae feed on Chloris gayana and Enteropogon acicularis.
