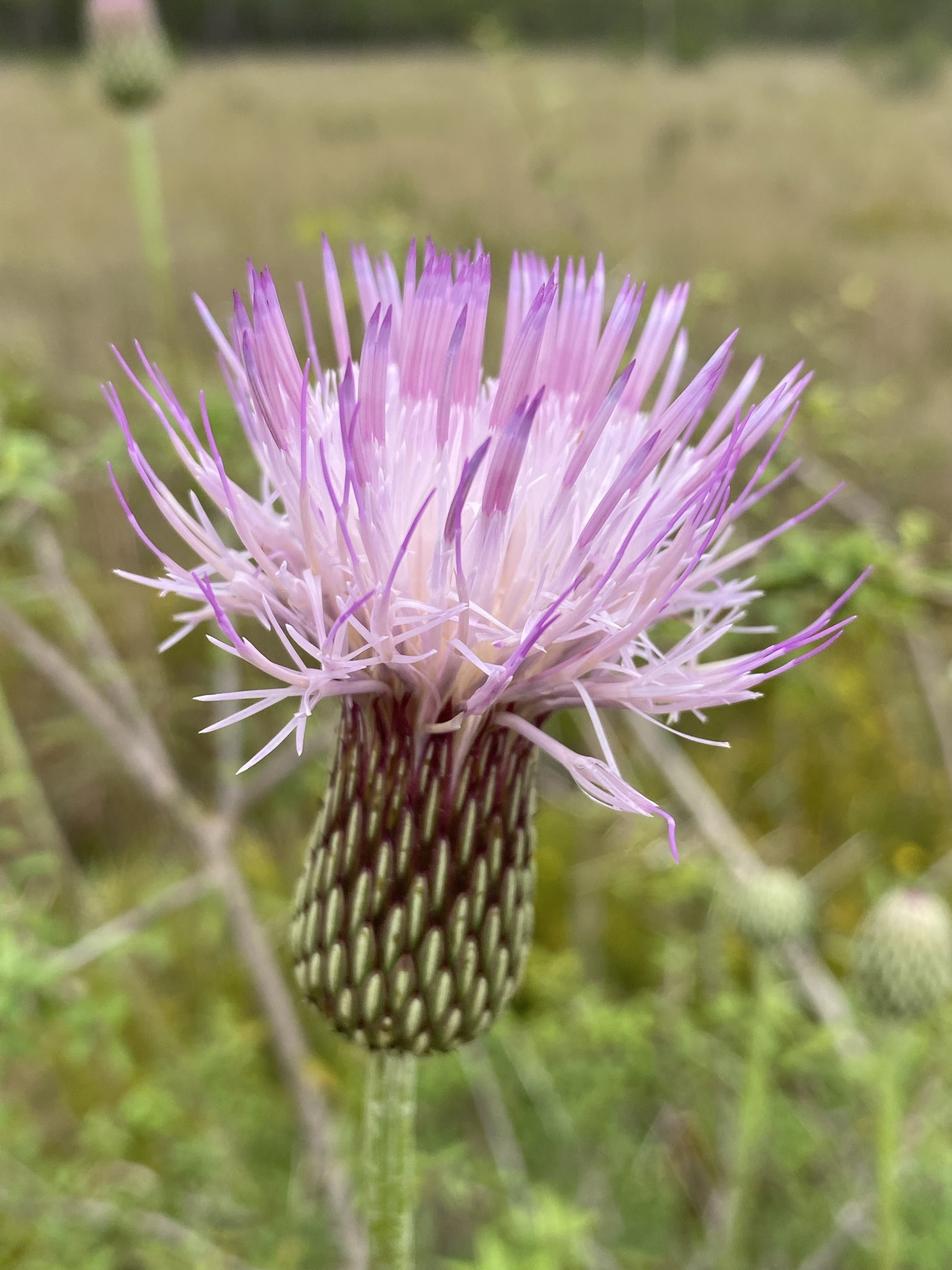

Scientific classification
- Kingdom: Plantae
- Clade: Embryophytes
- Clade: Tracheophytes
- Clade: Spermatophytes
- Clade: Angiosperms
- Clade: Eudicots
- Clade: Asterids
- Order: Asterales
- Family: Asteraceae
- Genus: Cirsium
- Species: C. lecontei

Binomial name
- Cirsium lecontei Torr. & Gray

Synonyms
- Aplotaxis pungens DC.; Carduus lecontei (Torr. & A.Gray) Pollard; Cirsium virginianum Hook.; Cnicus arvensis Hook. 1835 not (L.) Roth 1797; Cnicus lecontei (Torr. & A.Gray) A.Gray; Cnicus virginianus Pursh

= Cirsium lecontei =

Species of thistle

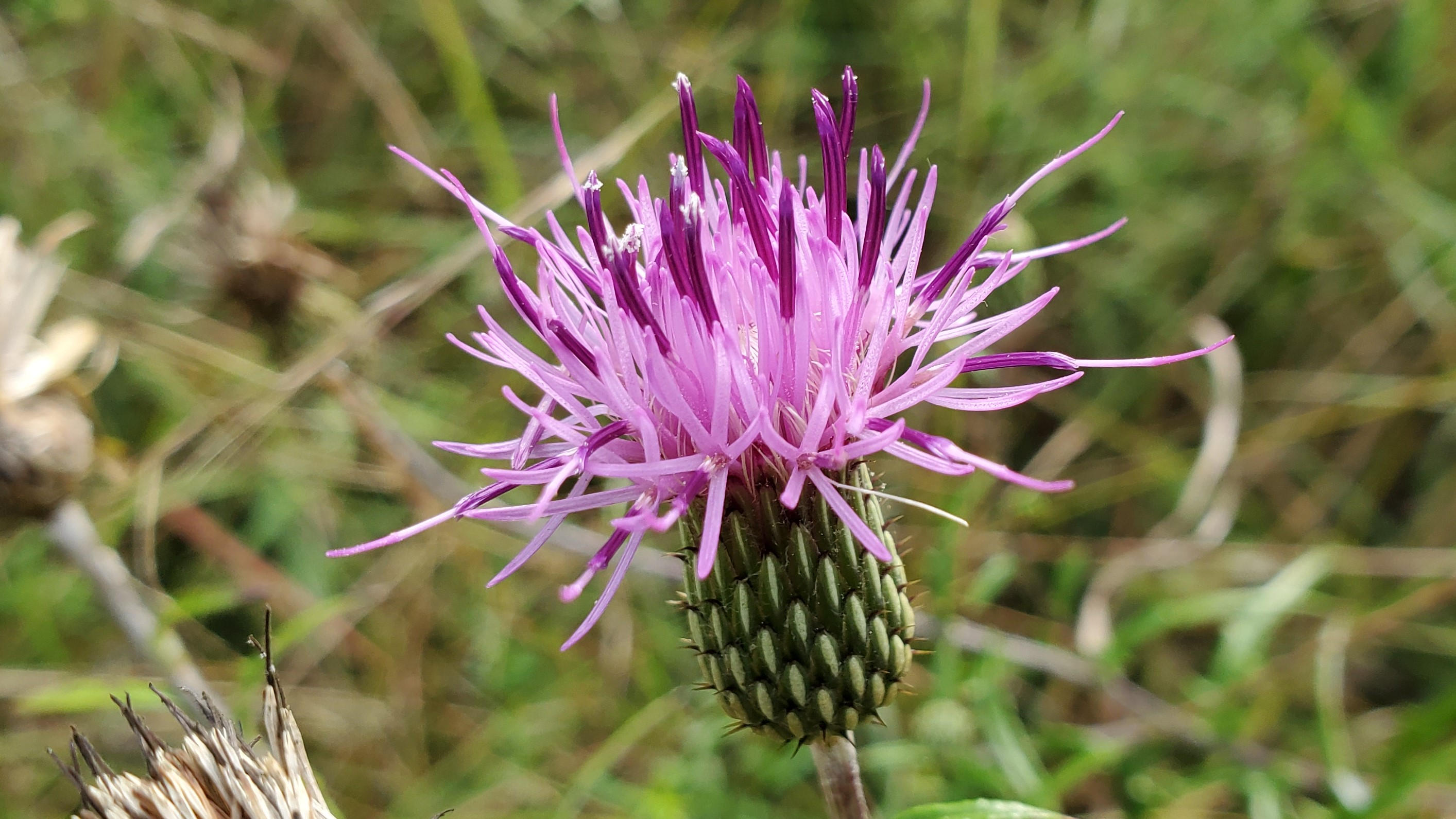
LeConte's thistle

Cirsium lecontei, often called the Le Conte's thistle, is a North American plant species native to the southeastern United States. It is a perennial, or sometimes biennial, species of the tribe Cardueae within the family Asteraceae. It grows along the coastal plain from Louisiana to North Carolina.

The flowering season is mainly spring to summer.

== Description ==
Cirsium lecontei grows to about 35–110 cm and has a taproot, sometimes with root sprouts. The plant is spiny and should be handled with care. The flowers are usually pink. The plant requires full sun. Le Conte's Thistle has a Wetland Indicator Status of FACW (facultative wetland, meaning that it usually occurs in wetlands but not always). The stems are loosely arachnoid and stiffly ascending. Leaves have blades that are linear to oblong or narrowly elliptic, loosely arachnoid when young, abaxial and adaxial faces glabrous (smooth), and lobes undivided or coarsely few toothed. Basal leaves sometimes absent at flowering, petiolate. Heads born singly or 2–5 or 10 in open, corymbiform arrays. Penduncles are 5–30 cm elevated above stem leaves. Cypselae are light brown, 5–5.75 mm long. Plants are often unbranched or sparingly branched, with single terminal flower heads that are above the foliage (plant leaves). Stem and lower leaf surfaces have cob webby hairs. With age, the plant starts losing the hairs and becoming glabrous (hairless, smooth). Leaves of the mid-stem are approximately 15 cm long, the leaves gradually reduce in size up the stem, and are pinnately lobed. Corollas have feather-like pappus bristles (modified sepals) that are pinkish/purple.

== Distribution ==
Cirsium lecontei occurs on the sandy pinelands of southern coastal plain in damp soil (where co-occurring species include Myrica, Cyrilla, and Ilex), specifically in the states of Alabama, Florida, Georgia, Louisiana, Mississippi, North Carolina and South Carolina. They are also found in moist to wet grassy pine savannahs and pine barrens, bogs (other species present include pitcher plants, Ilex, sedges, grasses, and sphagnum), and roadside ditches.

== Threats ==
Cirsium lecontei occurs mostly in North Carolina but even there it appears to be rare. Its presence is also rare from South Carolina south to Florida and west to Louisiana. Thus, populations tend to be very small and can be as small as one individual. The probable cause decreasing presence of these species are conversion of habitat to pine plantation which may include site prep activities (such as bedding and herbicides), inappropriate fire timing, and commercial and residential development.

== Species origin ==
R.J. Moore and C. Frankton (1969) suggested that the species may have originated as a product of ancient hybridization between the ancestors of C. horridulum and C. nuttallii. They also suggested a relationship between C. lecontei and C. grahamii of Arizona and hypothesized an ancient dispersal from the southeastern coastal plain to western cordillera.
