= Oedematopoda illucens =

Scientific classification
- Kingdom: Animalia
- Phylum: Arthropoda
- Class: Insecta
- Order: Lepidoptera
- Family: Stathmopodidae
- Genus: Oedematopoda
- Species: O. illucens

Binomial name
- Oedematopoda illucens (Meyrick, 1914)

Synonyms
- Eretmocera illucens Meyrick, 1914

Species of moth

Oedematopoda illucens is a moth of the family Stathmopodidae. It was described by Edward Meyrick in 1914. It is found in Sierra Leone and Mpumalanga, South Africa.

The wingspan is about 11 mm. The forewings are deep yellow, suffused with bronzy fuscous towards the middle, and becoming dark bluish fuscous on the apical third. The extreme base is dark bluish fuscous. The hindwings are orange yellow, paler towards rgw costa anteriorly. The apical third is dark fuscous.
