= Eretmocera cyanauges =

Scientific classification
- Domain: Eukaryota
- Kingdom: Animalia
- Phylum: Arthropoda
- Class: Insecta
- Order: Lepidoptera
- Family: Scythrididae
- Genus: Eretmocera
- Species: E. cyanauges

Binomial name
- Eretmocera cyanauges Turner, 1913

Species of moth

Eretmocera cyanauges is a moth of the family Scythrididae. It was described by Alfred Jefferis Turner in 1913. It is found in Australia, where it has been recorded from Queensland.

The wingspan is 14–17 mm. The forewings are dark fuscous, with a blue and purple sheen. There are four orange-yellow spots, the first on the dorsum at one-fourth, the second in the disc before the middle, the third on the tornus and the fourth on the costa at five-sixths. The hindwings are yellow.
