= Eretmocera chrysias =

Scientific classification
- Kingdom: Animalia
- Phylum: Arthropoda
- Class: Insecta
- Order: Lepidoptera
- Family: Scythrididae
- Genus: Eretmocera
- Species: E. chrysias

Binomial name
- Eretmocera chrysias (Meyrick, 1887)

Synonyms
- Castorura chrysias Meyrick, 1887

Species of moth

Eretmocera chrysias is a moth of the family Scythrididae. It was described by Edward Meyrick in 1887. It is found in Australia, where it has been recorded from Queensland and New South Wales.

The wingspan is about 15 mm. The forewings are purple-black with four roundish yellow spots, the first on the inner margin near the base, the second (largest) in the disc before the middle, the third on the inner margin before the anal angle, and the fourth on the costa beyond the third. The hindwings are yellow, with the apical fourth dark purple-fuscous.
