= Fulvoclysia subdolana =

Scientific classification
- Domain: Eukaryota
- Kingdom: Animalia
- Phylum: Arthropoda
- Class: Insecta
- Order: Lepidoptera
- Family: Tortricidae
- Genus: Fulvoclysia
- Species: F. subdolana

Binomial name
- Fulvoclysia subdolana (Kennel, 1901)

Synonyms
- Euxanthis subdolana Kennel, 1901; Euxanthis subflavana Amsel, 1959

Species of moth

Fulvoclysia subdolana is a species of moth of the family Tortricidae. It is found in the Caucasus, Syria, Iraq and Iran.
