= Dicymolomia metalophota =

Scientific classification
- Domain: Eukaryota
- Kingdom: Animalia
- Phylum: Arthropoda
- Class: Insecta
- Order: Lepidoptera
- Family: Crambidae
- Genus: Dicymolomia
- Species: D. metalophota

Binomial name
- Dicymolomia metalophota (Hampson, 1897)

Synonyms
- Ambia metalophota Hampson, 1897; Bifalculina argentipunctalis Amsel, 1956; Lipocosma consortalis Dyar, 1914

Species of moth

Dicymolomia metalophota is a moth in the family Crambidae. It was described by George Hampson in 1897. It is found in the south-eastern United States (Florida, South Carolina, Texas) and Guatemala south-east to Venezuela. It is also present in the Caribbean.

Adults have been recorded on wing year round.

The larvae possibly feed on Cajanus cajan.
