= Eretmocera coracopis =

Scientific classification
- Domain: Eukaryota
- Kingdom: Animalia
- Phylum: Arthropoda
- Class: Insecta
- Order: Lepidoptera
- Family: Scythrididae
- Genus: Eretmocera
- Species: E. coracopis

Binomial name
- Eretmocera coracopis (Turner, 1927)

Synonyms
- Leuroscelis coracopis Turner, 1927

Species of moth

Eretmocera coracopis is a moth of the family Scythrididae. It was described by Alfred Jefferis Turner in 1927. It is found in Australia, where it has been recorded from Tasmania.

The wingspan is about 12 mm. The forewings are blackish with an obscure suffused grey-whitish spot on the tornus. The hindwings are dark-fuscous.
