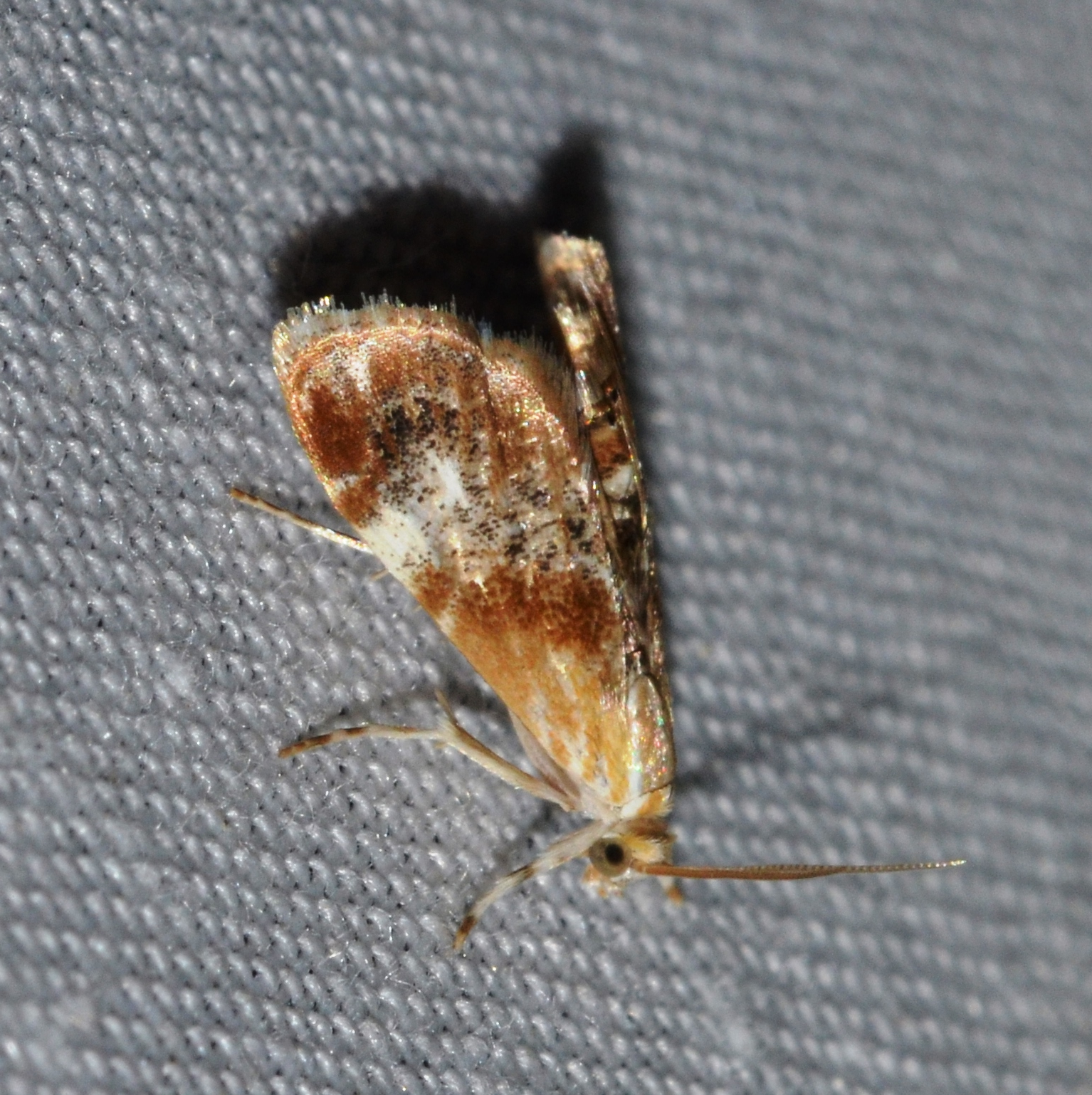
- Dicymolomia julianalis

Scientific classification
- Kingdom: Animalia
- Phylum: Arthropoda
- Class: Insecta
- Order: Lepidoptera
- Family: Crambidae
- Subfamily: Glaphyriinae
- Genus: Dicymolomia; Zeller, 1872

Synonyms
- Bifalculina Amsel, 1956

= Dicymolomia =

Genus of moths

Dicymolomia is a genus of moths of the family Crambidae.

== Species ==
- Dicymolomia diminutalis
- Dicymolomia grisea
- Dicymolomia julianalis (Walker, 1859)
- Dicymolomia metalliferalis (Packard, 1873)
- Dicymolomia metalophota (Hampson, 1897)
- Dicymolomia micropunctalis
- Dicymolomia opuntialis
- Dicymolomia rufifusalis (Hampson, 1912)
