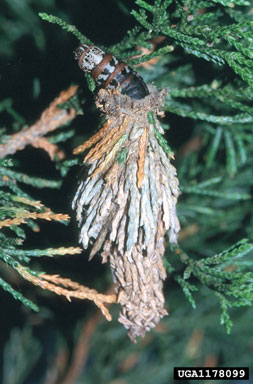

Scientific classification
- Kingdom: Animalia
- Phylum: Arthropoda
- Clade: Pancrustacea
- Class: Insecta
- Order: Lepidoptera
- Family: Psychidae
- Genus: Thyridopteryx
- Species: T. ephemeraeformis

Binomial name
- Thyridopteryx ephemeraeformis (Haworth, 1803)

= Evergreen bagworm =

Species of moth

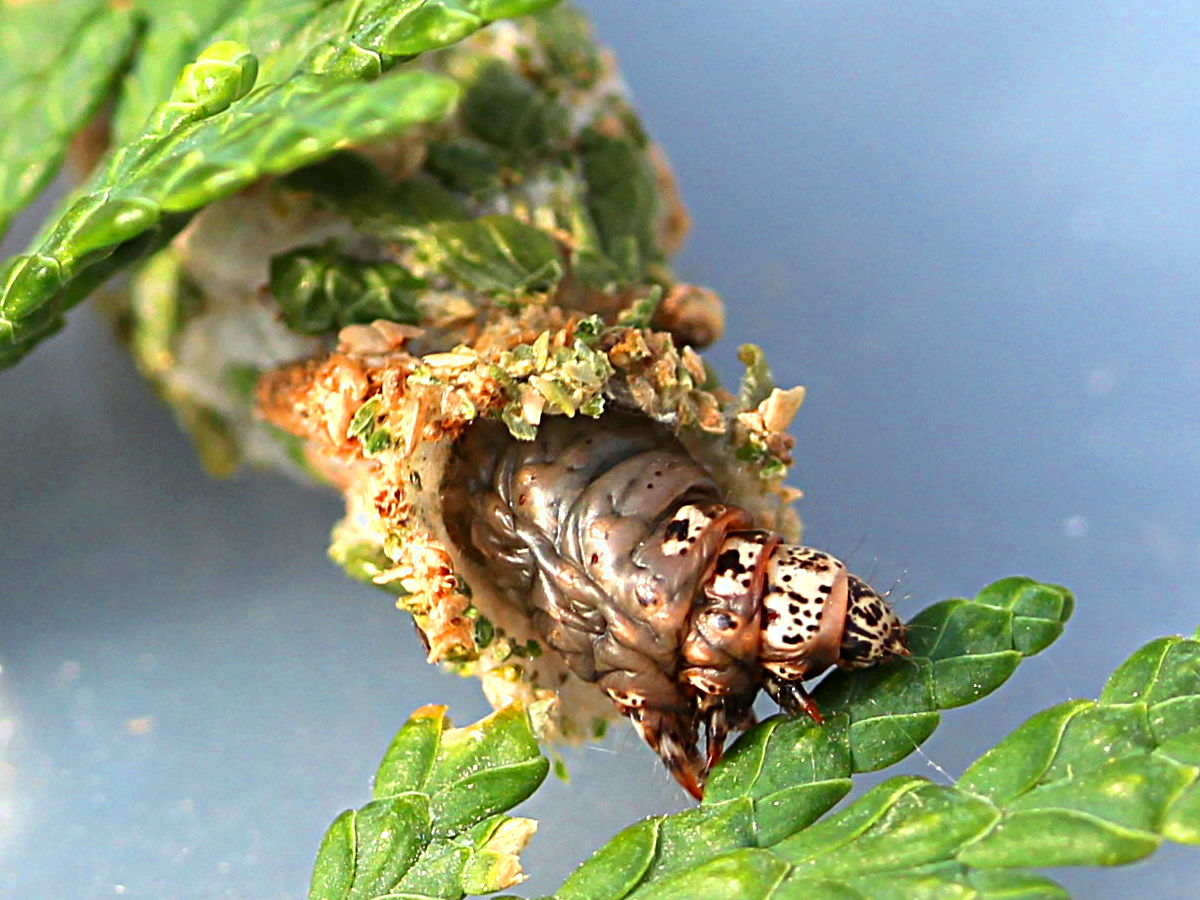
larva crawling

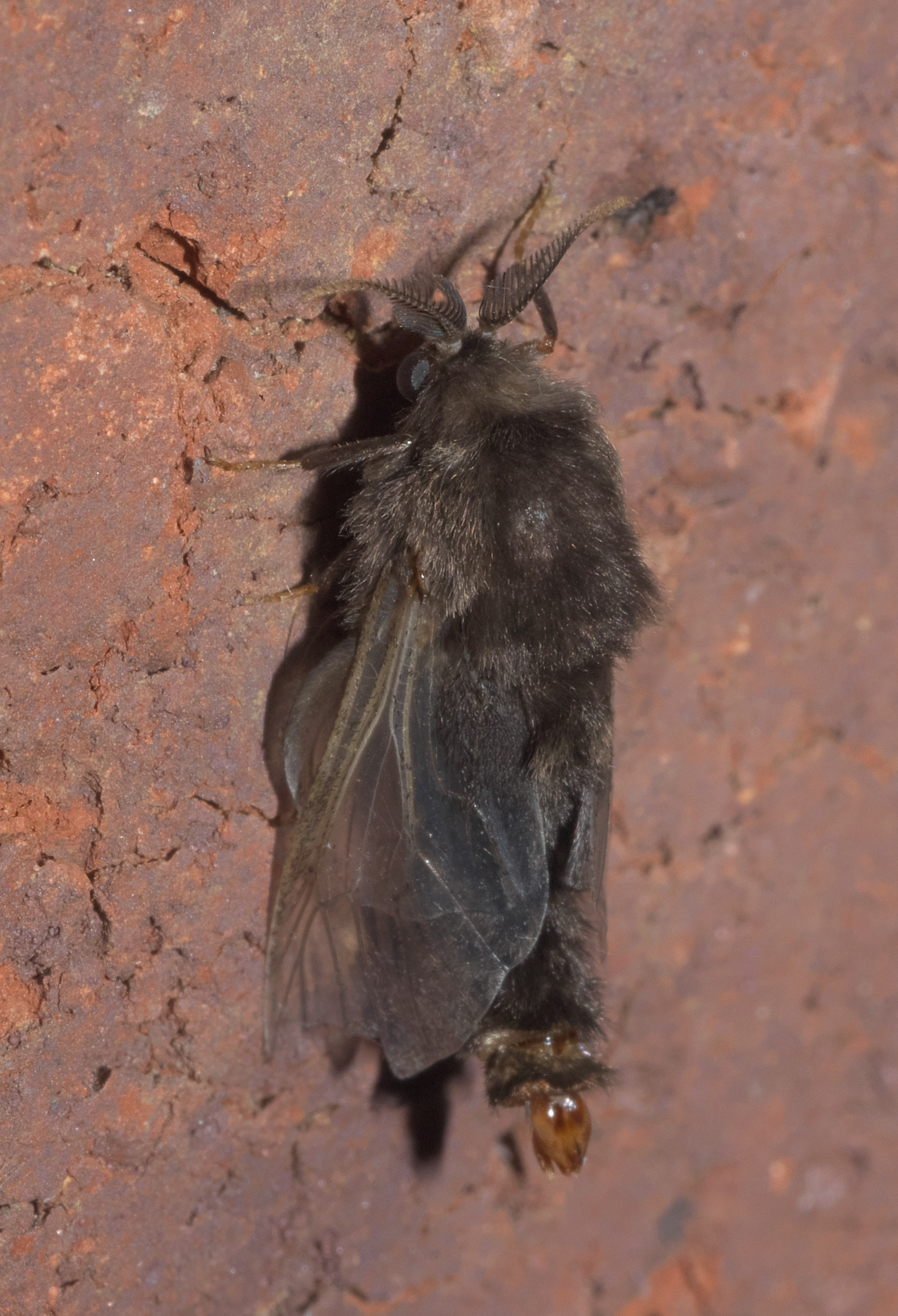
Thyridopteryx ephemeraeformis, evergreen bagworm

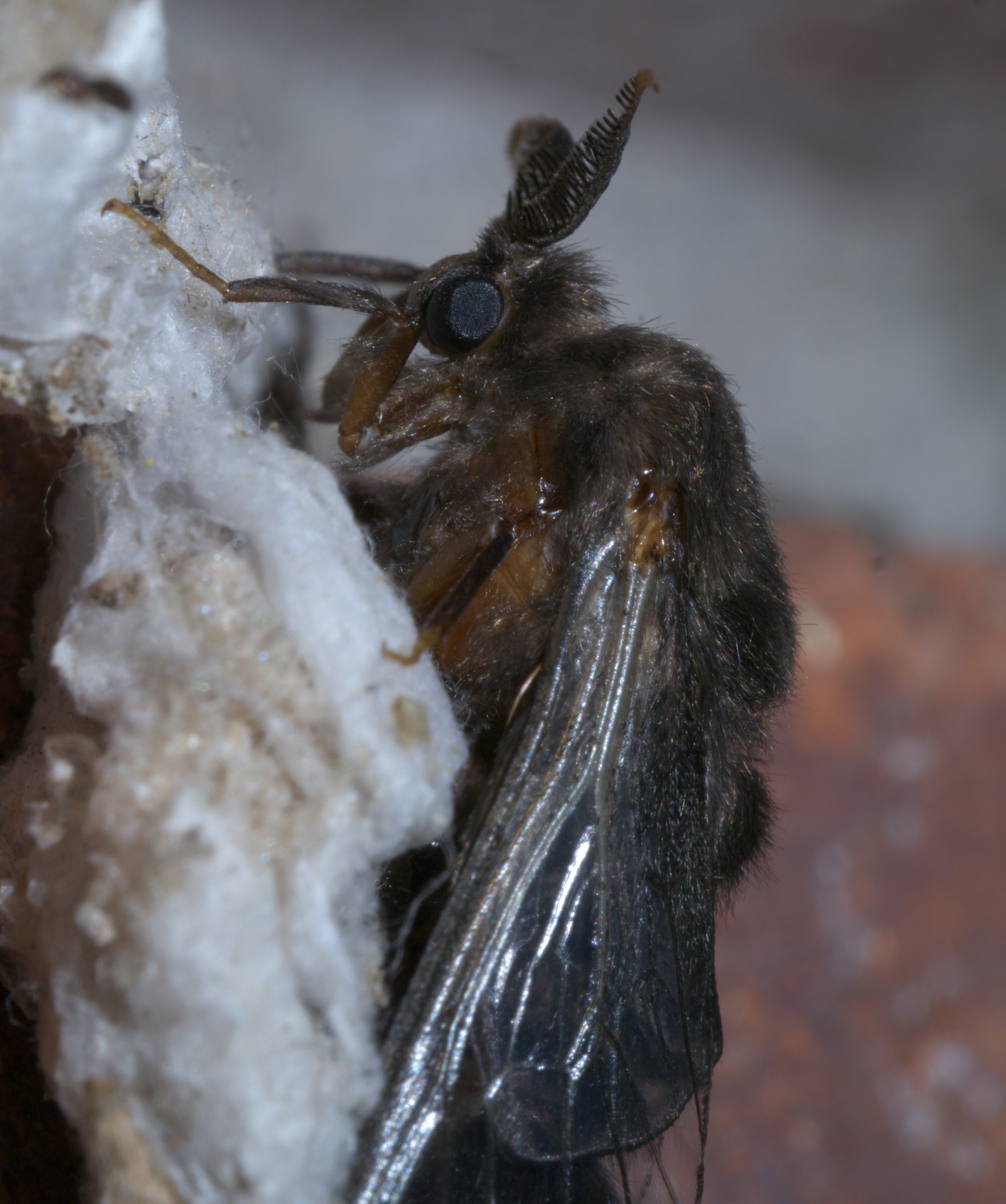
Thyridopteryx ephemeraeformis, evergreen bagworm

The evergreen bagworm (Thyridopteryx ephemeraeformis), commonly known as bagworm, eastern bagworm, common bagworm, common basket worm, or North American bagworm, is a moth that spins its cocoon in its larval life, decorating it with bits of plant material from the trees on which it feeds.

The evergreen bagworm's case grows to over 6 cm, tapered and open on both ends. Newborn larvae are blackish and turn brown to tan as they grow, mottled with black. The heads and thorax develop a yellow tint as they grow to a total length of 24 to 32 mm. Adult males resemble bees, having a 25 mm wingspan with transparent wings (thuris window + pterux wing) and black furry bodies. Adult females are maggot-like with yellowish-white soft bodies 19 to 23 mm long and small tufts of hair near the end of the abdomen. The cream-colored eggs are 0.75 mm in diameter.

The evergreen bagworm thrives in the eastern United States as far west as Nebraska, north into New England, and bordering the Gulf of Mexico south throughout Texas. It has been found in other countries, such as South Africa, Croatia, and in the north-east of Iran. Large populations in forested areas are rare. With scarce predators in urban areas, evergreen bagworms often thrive in urban habitats. When disturbed, the larva retracts its head into its case and closes the front opening. Mature larvae may remain in the host tree or drag their case nearby before attaching themselves for the pupa stage.

The diet of larvae consists of leaves and buds of trees. Arborvitae and red cedar are favored host trees. Cypress, juniper, pine, spruce, apple, birch, black locust, elm, maple, poplar, oak, sycamore, willow, and over 100 other species can also be eaten.

Bagworms are commonly parasitized by ichneumonid wasps, notably Itoplectis conquisitor. Predators include vespid wasps and hornets. Woodpeckers and sapsuckers can feed on the larvae from their cases.

Eggs hatch from early April to early June (earlier in the south), and larvae emerge from the carcass of their mother in her case. Newborn larvae emerge from the bottom of the hanging case and drop down on a strand of silk. The wind often blows the larva to nearby plants, beginning its new case from silk and fecal material before adding leaves and twigs from its host. When mature in mid-August, the larva wraps silk around a branch, hangs from it, and pupates head down. The silk is so strong that it can strangle and kill the branch it hangs from over several years as the branch grows. Adult males transform into moths in four weeks to seek out females for mating. The female never leaves the cocoon, requiring that the male mate with her through the open end at the back of the case. She has no eyes, legs, wings, or antennae and can't eat, but she emits a strong pheromone to attract a mate. After her death, with hundreds to several thousand eggs still inside, her offspring hatch and pass through her body, pupal shell, and case over several months, emerging to start their cases. Later, her pupal case can be found, full of the yellow remains of eggshells.

The bagworm has a voracious appetite and is considered a serious pest. Host trees develop damaged foliage that will kill the tree if left unchecked. If caught early enough in an infestation, the cases from the previous year can be picked off by hand before the end of May. They are easiest to detect in the fall after their cases have turned brown, especially on evergreen trees. Various bacterial sprays such as Bacillus thuringiensis Bt/Spinosad and stomach insecticides such as carbaryl (Sevin) are used to control infestations.

== Sources ==
- University of Minnesota Department of Entomology: Bagworm Information
- Forest Pests: Evergreen Bagworm
- Ohio State University: Bagworm and Its Control
