= Dichomeris indignus =

Scientific classification
- Kingdom: Animalia
- Phylum: Arthropoda
- Class: Insecta
- Order: Lepidoptera
- Family: Gelechiidae
- Genus: Dichomeris
- Species: D. indignus

Binomial name
- Dichomeris indignus (Walsingham, [1892])

Synonyms
- Ypsolophus indignus Walsingham, [1892]

Species of moth

Dichomeris indignus is a moth in the family Gelechiidae. It was described by Thomas de Grey, 6th Baron Walsingham, in 1892. It is found in the West Indies, where it has been recorded from St. Vincent.

The wingspan is about 11 mm (0.43 in). The forewings are pale rufo-cinerous, with a few chestnut mottlings and a blackish discal spot before the middle, another on the fold almost exactly below it, but perhaps a little further removed from the base. There is a pair of very inconspicuous chestnut-brown spots on each side of the fold near the base, the lower preceding the upper, and another pair at about the end of the cell, sometimes fused into one spot but not conspicuous. There is also a series of five small black triangular dots (three on the apical margin, one on the apex, and one above it. The hindwings are reddish grey.
