= Dichomeris fulvicilia =

Scientific classification
- Kingdom: Animalia
- Phylum: Arthropoda
- Class: Insecta
- Order: Lepidoptera
- Family: Gelechiidae
- Genus: Dichomeris
- Species: D. fulvicilia

Binomial name
- Dichomeris fulvicilia (Meyrick, 1922)

Synonyms
- Trichotaphe fulvicilia Meyrick, 1922

Species of moth

Dichomeris fulvicilia is a moth in the family Gelechiidae. It was described by Edward Meyrick in 1922. It is found in Amazonas, Brazil.

The wingspan is 16–17 mm (0.63–0.67 in). The forewings are pale ochreous, thinly speckled with dark brown and with a rather broad ill-defined streak of dark brown suffusion beneath the middle from the base of the dorsum to the termen beneath the apex. There is a slender suffused dark brown streak along the costa from the middle to near the apex, as well as a dark fuscous terminal interrupted line or series of dots. The hindwings are grey.
