= Dichomeris ostensella =

Scientific classification
- Kingdom: Animalia
- Phylum: Arthropoda
- Class: Insecta
- Order: Lepidoptera
- Family: Gelechiidae
- Genus: Dichomeris
- Species: D. ostensella

Binomial name
- Dichomeris ostensella (Walker, 1864)

Synonyms
- Gelechia ostensella Walker, 1864

Species of moth

Dichomeris ostensella is a moth in the family Gelechiidae. It was described by Francis Walker in 1864. It is found in Guyana and Amazonas, Brazil.

Adults are coal black, the forewings with a deep cupreous-black patch in the disc and a submarginal band of the same colour. There are two intermediate black cinereous-bordered dots and a few minute black marginal dots. The hindwings are dark cupreous.
