= Dichomeris clarescens =

Scientific classification
- Kingdom: Animalia
- Phylum: Arthropoda
- Class: Insecta
- Order: Lepidoptera
- Family: Gelechiidae
- Genus: Dichomeris
- Species: D. clarescens

Binomial name
- Dichomeris clarescens Meyrick, 1913

Species of moth

Dichomeris clarescens is a moth in the family Gelechiidae. It was described by Edward Meyrick in 1913. It is found in Sri Lanka.

The wingspan is about 22 mm (0.87 in). The forewings are ochreous brown, suffused with fuscous except towards the costa before the apex, where it is brighter ochreous. The median fourth of the costa is obscurely strigulated with dark fuscous. The stigmata are obscure, dark fuscous, the discal approximated, the plical elongate, slightly before the first discal. There is an undefined triangular spot of dark fuscous suffusion on the costa at two-thirds and a suffused dark fuscous streak along the termen. The hindwings are dark fuscous, rather thinly scaled in the disc anteriorly.
