= Dichomeris exallacta =

Scientific classification
- Kingdom: Animalia
- Phylum: Arthropoda
- Class: Insecta
- Order: Lepidoptera
- Family: Gelechiidae
- Genus: Dichomeris
- Species: D. exallacta

Binomial name
- Dichomeris exallacta (Meyrick, 1926)

Synonyms
- Cymotricha exallacta Meyrick, 1926

Species of moth

Dichomeris exallacta is a moth in the family Gelechiidae. It was described by Edward Meyrick in 1926. It is found in Peru.

The wingspan is about 15 mm (0.59 in). The forewings are light grey, suffusedly irrorated (sprinkled) with whitish towards the costa and dorsum from about one-third onwards. The stigmata is cloudy, obscurely and indistinctly darker, the plical rather obliquely before first the discal. There is an obtusely angulated obscure whitish transverse shade at four-fifths, the terminal area beyond this suffusedly irrorated with whitish. There are also indistinct dark grey marginal dots on the apical part of the costa and termen. The hindwings are light grey.
