= Dichomeris ferrogra =

Scientific classification
- Domain: Eukaryota
- Kingdom: Animalia
- Phylum: Arthropoda
- Class: Insecta
- Order: Lepidoptera
- Family: Gelechiidae
- Genus: Dichomeris
- Species: D. ferrogra

Binomial name
- Dichomeris ferrogra H.-H. Li & H.-J. Wang, 1997

Species of moth

Dichomeris ferrogra is a moth in the family Gelechiidae. It was described by Hou-Hun Li and Hong-Jian Wang in 1997. It is found in Yunnan, China.

The wingspan is about 13 mm.
