= Dichomeris semicuprata =

Scientific classification
- Kingdom: Animalia
- Phylum: Arthropoda
- Class: Insecta
- Order: Lepidoptera
- Family: Gelechiidae
- Genus: Dichomeris
- Species: D. semicuprata

Binomial name
- Dichomeris semicuprata (Meyrick, 1922)

Synonyms
- Trichotaphe semicuprata Meyrick, 1922

Species of moth

Dichomeris semicuprata is a moth in the family Gelechiidae. It was described by Edward Meyrick in 1922.

== Distribution ==
Dichomeris semicuprata can be found in the country of Peru.

== Physical Features ==
The wingspan is about 14 mm (0.55 in). The forewings are dark violet grey with a fine yellowish supramedian line from the base to one-fourth and two slight yellow marks between the apex of this and the costa. There is a moderate blackish fascia before the middle, not reaching the dorsum. A coppery-brown-reddish patch occupies nearly all of the apical half of the wing, edged anteriorly with ochreous whitish towards the costa. The hindwings are dark fuscous.
