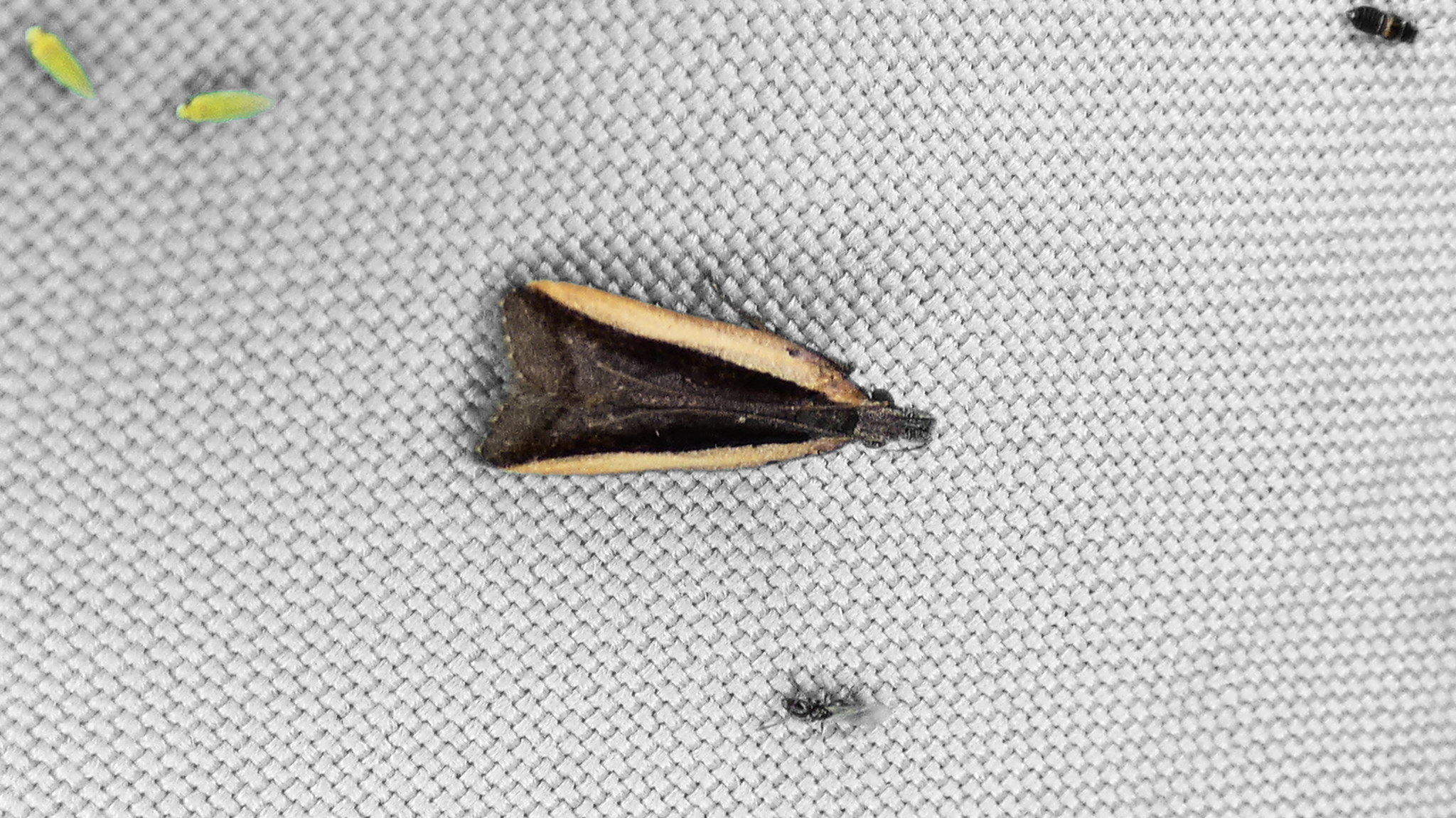

Scientific classification
- Kingdom: Animalia
- Phylum: Arthropoda
- Clade: Pancrustacea
- Class: Insecta
- Order: Lepidoptera
- Family: Gelechiidae
- Genus: Dichomeris
- Species: D. costalis

Binomial name
- Dichomeris costalis Busck, 1914

= Dichomeris costalis =

Species of moth

Dichomeris costalis is a species of moth in the family Gelechiidae. It was first described by August Busck in 1914. It is found in Panama.

== Description ==
The wingspan is about 20 mm. The costal area of the forewings is light ochreous brown with a violet sheen, edged by deep velvety black. There is a longitudinal streak from the inner angle of the wing to the apex, this black colour gradually fading into the dark blackish fuscous colour which occupies the dorsal half of the wing and there is a thin indistinct black line parallel with the termen. The hindwings are shiny light fuscous.
