= Dichomeris quadrata =

Scientific classification
- Kingdom: Animalia
- Phylum: Arthropoda
- Class: Insecta
- Order: Lepidoptera
- Family: Gelechiidae
- Genus: Dichomeris
- Species: D. quadrata

Binomial name
- Dichomeris quadrata Park & Ponomarenko, 1998

Species of moth

Dichomeris quadrata is a moth in the family Gelechiidae. It was described by Kyu-Tek Park and Margarita Gennadievna Ponomarenko in 1998. It is found in Thailand.

The wingspan is 14.5-15.5 mm.
