= Dichomeris capillata =

Scientific classification
- Domain: Eukaryota
- Kingdom: Animalia
- Phylum: Arthropoda
- Class: Insecta
- Order: Lepidoptera
- Family: Gelechiidae
- Genus: Dichomeris
- Species: D. capillata

Binomial name
- Dichomeris capillata (Walsingham, 1911)

Synonyms
- Anorthosia capillata Walsingham, 1911

Species of moth

Dichomeris capillata is a moth in the family Gelechiidae. It was described by Thomas de Grey, 6th Baron Walsingham, in 1911. It is found in Guatemala and Panama.

The wingspan is about 12 mm (0.47 in). The forewings are ochreous, streaked and clouded with brown. A broad brown streak crosses the cell about the middle of the wing, obliquely outward from its upper to its lower edge, and above and beyond this the wing is more or less clouded with the same colour, slender lines of ochreous scales run through it in the direction of the veins and some fuscous scales are strewn along the fold throughout. There are also a few on the cell beyond the oblique brown streak, some below the costa, and others, forming a slight fuscous shade, before the apex and termen. A pale ochreous line marks the base of the light brownish cilia. The hindwings are brownish grey.
