= Dichomeris traumatias =

Scientific classification
- Kingdom: Animalia
- Phylum: Arthropoda
- Class: Insecta
- Order: Lepidoptera
- Family: Gelechiidae
- Genus: Dichomeris
- Species: D. traumatias

Binomial name
- Dichomeris traumatias (Meyrick, 1923)

Synonyms
- Myrophila traumatias Meyrick, 1923

Species of moth

Dichomeris traumatias is a moth in the family Gelechiidae. It was described by Edward Meyrick in 1923. It is found on Borneo.

The wingspan is about 21 mm (0.83 in). The forewings are violet fuscous with the costal edge bright ferruginous and short red median and subdorsal streaks almost from the base, the former terminating in a small spot. There is a small red spot beneath the fold at one-fourth. The stigmata form small red spots, the plical hardly before the first discal. There is an additional spot in the disc at one-fourth, tending to form an oblique streak with the plical, and another spot below the middle of the disc. There are also irregularly arranged red dashes on the veins posteriorly, forming two series separated by an obscure pale or whitish-tinged rather curved subterminal shade. The hindwings are dark fuscous.
