= Dichomeris designatella =

Scientific classification
- Kingdom: Animalia
- Phylum: Arthropoda
- Class: Insecta
- Order: Lepidoptera
- Family: Gelechiidae
- Genus: Dichomeris
- Species: D. designatella

Binomial name
- Dichomeris designatella (Walker, 1864)

Synonyms
- Gelechia designatella Walker, 1864

Species of moth

Dichomeris designatella is a moth in the family Gelechiidae. It was described by Francis Walker in 1864. It is found in Peru and Amazonas, Brazil.

Adults are dark slaty cinereous, the forewings with two very large black spots, the first bordered by whitish on two sides and the second bordered by a whitish slightly curved line on the inner side. There is a black discal dot, bordered by whitish, between these. The marginal dots are black.
