= Dichomeris synergastis =

Scientific classification
- Kingdom: Animalia
- Phylum: Arthropoda
- Class: Insecta
- Order: Lepidoptera
- Family: Gelechiidae
- Genus: Dichomeris
- Species: D. synergastis

Binomial name
- Dichomeris synergastis Ponomarenko & Park, 1996

Species of moth

Dichomeris synergastis is a moth in the family Gelechiidae. It was described by Ponomarenko and Park in 1996. It is found in Korea.

The wingspan is 20–22 mm (0.79–0.87 in).
