= Dichomeris planata =

Scientific classification
- Kingdom: Animalia
- Phylum: Arthropoda
- Class: Insecta
- Order: Lepidoptera
- Family: Gelechiidae
- Genus: Dichomeris
- Species: D. planata

Binomial name
- Dichomeris planata (Meyrick, 1910)

Synonyms
- Trichotaphe planata Meyrick, 1910

Species of moth

Dichomeris planata is a moth in the family Gelechiidae. It was described by Edward Meyrick in 1910. It is found in northern India.

The wingspan is about 18 mm (0.71 in). The forewings are light greyish ochreous tinged with tannish peach and with the costal edge ochreous whitish. The stigmata is dark fuscous, with the discal nearly approximated, the plical obliquely before the first discal. The hindwings are grey.
