= Dichomeris baccata =

Scientific classification
- Kingdom: Animalia
- Phylum: Arthropoda
- Class: Insecta
- Order: Lepidoptera
- Family: Gelechiidae
- Genus: Dichomeris
- Species: D. baccata

Binomial name
- Dichomeris baccata Meyrick, 1923

Species of moth

Dichomeris baccata is a moth in the family Gelechiidae. It was described by Edward Meyrick in 1923. It is found in Amazonas, Brazil.

The wingspan is about 13 mm (0.51 in). The forewings are ochreous whitish with the markings formed of dark fuscous irroration (sprinkles). There is a small spot on the base of the costa, and one beneath the costa near the base, as well as an oblique-oval spot crossing the fold at one-fourth and some fuscous irroration towards the base of the dorsum. The stigmata is moderate, rather elongate, the plical slightly before the first discal. There is an elongate suffused mark above and between the first and second discal, as well as a streak along the costa from before the middle to three-fourths, attenuated anteriorly. There is also a rather bent whitish shade from four-fifths of the costa to the tornus, preceded and followed by undefined bands of brownish irroration. A spot of darker suffusion is located before the apex and there are marginal black dots around the apex and termen. The hindwings are grey.
