= Dichomeris abscessella =

Scientific classification
- Kingdom: Animalia
- Phylum: Arthropoda
- Class: Insecta
- Order: Lepidoptera
- Family: Gelechiidae
- Genus: Dichomeris
- Species: D. abscessella

Binomial name
- Dichomeris abscessella (Walker, 1863)

Synonyms
- Psecadia abscessella Walker, 1863; Vazugada strigiplenella Walker, 1864; Dichomeris zonostoma Meyrick, 1914

Species of moth

Dichomeris abscessella is a moth in the family Gelechiidae. It was described by Francis Walker in 1863. It is found in Guyana and Amazonas, Brazil.

The wingspan is about 16 mm. The forewings are whitish ochreous with a broad irregular brown median stripe from the base to the apex, and a narrower one along the dorsum from near the base to the middle of the termen. The veins are partially marked with suffused dark fuscous lines on these streaks, and towards the costa exteriorly. There is a narrow suffused fuscous streak along the costa from before the middle to four-fifths, the plical and second discal stigmata blackish. There is a whitish line around the posterior part of the costa and termen, marked with a series of black marks or dots on the apex and termen. The hindwings are dark grey.
