= Dichomeris horocompsa =

Scientific classification
- Kingdom: Animalia
- Phylum: Arthropoda
- Class: Insecta
- Order: Lepidoptera
- Family: Gelechiidae
- Genus: Dichomeris
- Species: D. horocompsa

Binomial name
- Dichomeris horocompsa Meyrick, 1933

Species of moth

Dichomeris horocompsa is a moth in the family Gelechiidae. It was described by Edward Meyrick in 1933. It is found in Bolivia.
