= Dichomeris hodgesi =

Scientific classification
- Domain: Eukaryota
- Kingdom: Animalia
- Phylum: Arthropoda
- Class: Insecta
- Order: Lepidoptera
- Family: Gelechiidae
- Genus: Dichomeris
- Species: D. hodgesi

Binomial name
- Dichomeris hodgesi H.-H. Li & Z.-M. Zheng, 1996

Species of moth

Dichomeris hodgesi is a moth in the family Gelechiidae. It was described by Hou-Hun Li and Zhe-Min Zheng in 1996. It is found in the Chinese provinces of Shaanxi and Jiangxi.
