= Dichomeris leucostena =

Scientific classification
- Kingdom: Animalia
- Phylum: Arthropoda
- Clade: Pancrustacea
- Class: Insecta
- Order: Lepidoptera
- Family: Gelechiidae
- Genus: Dichomeris
- Species: D. leucostena

Binomial name
- Dichomeris leucostena Walsingham, 1911

Species of moth

Dichomeris leucostena is a moth in the family Gelechiidae. It was described by Thomas de Grey, 6th Baron Walsingham, in 1911. It is found in Mexico (Guerrero).

The wingspan is about 18 mm (0.71 in). The forewings are brownish fuscous, darker on the basal third than beyond it, with a broad darkened oblique shade parallel with the termen at three-fourths, and a small dark spot about the upper angle of the cell. There is a broad white band along the costa, including at its origin the whole base of the wing, except for a short dark streak along the extreme costa, and gradually attenuate to its apex at the commencement of the costal cilia. The hindwings are pale greyish.
