= Dichomeris uranopis =

Scientific classification
- Kingdom: Animalia
- Phylum: Arthropoda
- Class: Insecta
- Order: Lepidoptera
- Family: Gelechiidae
- Genus: Dichomeris
- Species: D. uranopis

Binomial name
- Dichomeris uranopis (Meyrick, 1894)

Synonyms
- Zalithia uranopis Meyrick, 1894

Species of moth

Dichomeris uranopis is a moth in the family Gelechiidae. It was described by Edward Meyrick in 1894. It is found in Myanmar.

The wingspan is about 15 mm (0.59 in). The forewings are orange ferruginous, the apical two-fifths coppery blackish. The markings are bright metallic green blue, consisting of a streak along the anterior half of the costa and a streak along the submedian fold from the base to the middle of the wing. There is a rather narrow fascia separating the ferruginous and black portions, interrupted below the middle and not reaching the inner margin. There is also an irregular apical fascia, broken into spots on the lower part of the hindmargin. The hindwings are dark fuscous, darker and somewhat coppery tinged on the posterior half.
