= Dichomeris excavata =

Scientific classification
- Domain: Eukaryota
- Kingdom: Animalia
- Phylum: Arthropoda
- Class: Insecta
- Order: Lepidoptera
- Family: Gelechiidae
- Genus: Dichomeris
- Species: D. excavata

Binomial name
- Dichomeris excavata Busck, 1914

Species of moth

Dichomeris excavata is a moth in the family Gelechiidae. It was described by August Busck in 1914. It is found in Panama.

The wingspan is about 14 mm. The forewings are metallic blue with dark brown markings. There is a broad, outwardly convex deep brown velvety fascia at the basal third and the entire terminal third of the wing are deep blackish brown with a costal blue blotch extended as a thin, blue, marginal line around the edge. There are four large, poorly defined, round, brown spots on the middle of the wing. The hindwings are dark fuscous.
