= Dichomeris lypetica =

Scientific classification
- Domain: Eukaryota
- Kingdom: Animalia
- Phylum: Arthropoda
- Class: Insecta
- Order: Lepidoptera
- Family: Gelechiidae
- Genus: Dichomeris
- Species: D. lypetica

Binomial name
- Dichomeris lypetica Walsingham, 1911

Species of moth

Dichomeris lypetica is a moth in the family Gelechiidae. It was described by Thomas de Grey, 6th Baron Walsingham, in 1911. It is found in Mexico (Guerrero).

The wingspan is about 12 mm (0.47 in). The forewings are brownish fuscous, very minutely speckled with pale cinereous and with a group of spots scarcely distinguishable in a slightly darker shade of brownish fuscous, the first discal spot a little preceding the plical. There is some obscure shading which faintly indicates an ante-terminal band, bowed outward at its middle, and a terminal line preceding the pale cinereous cilia which are much mixed with fuscous. The hindwings are pale cinereous.
