= Dichomeris macroxyla =

Scientific classification
- Kingdom: Animalia
- Phylum: Arthropoda
- Class: Insecta
- Order: Lepidoptera
- Family: Gelechiidae
- Genus: Dichomeris
- Species: D. macroxyla

Binomial name
- Dichomeris macroxyla (Meyrick, 1913)

Synonyms
- Trichotaphe macroxyla Meyrick, 1913

Species of moth

Dichomeris macroxyla is a moth in the family Gelechiidae. It was described by Edward Meyrick in 1913. It is found in Assam, India.

The wingspan is 18–20 mm (0.71–0.79 in). The forewings are whitish ochreous, the posterior two-thirds of the costa, and dorsum and termen throughout rather broadly suffused with brown, darkest on the margin of the wing, cut at the apex by a fine streak of ground colour. The stigmata is minute, blackish, the plical slightly before the first discal. A black line runs around the apex and termen. The hindwings are grey.
