= Dichomeris pyretodes =

Scientific classification
- Kingdom: Animalia
- Phylum: Arthropoda
- Class: Insecta
- Order: Lepidoptera
- Family: Gelechiidae
- Genus: Dichomeris
- Species: D. pyretodes

Binomial name
- Dichomeris pyretodes (Meyrick, 1914)

Synonyms
- Noeza pyretodes Meyrick, 1914

Species of moth

Dichomeris pyretodes is a moth in the family Gelechiidae. It was described by Edward Meyrick in 1914. It is found in Guyana, Brazil and Peru.

The wingspan is 14–16 mm (0.55–0.63 in). The forewings are ochreous whitish, the dorsal three-fifths suffusedly tinged with pale ferruginous. The markings are suffused, dark ferruginous and there is a small mark on the base of the costa, as well as an irregular patch extending in the disc from the base to one-fourth and a slender streak along the costa from two-fifths to three-fourths. There are elongate marks towards the costa about the middle and at three-fourths, as well as a streak through the disc from about one-third to three-fourths interrupted by a whitish dot representing the first discal stigma and two representing the second. A short oblique streak terminates in the costa above the apex and there is a line along the apical portion of the costa. The hindwings are grey.
