= Dichomeris deceptella =

Scientific classification
- Kingdom: Animalia
- Phylum: Arthropoda
- Class: Insecta
- Order: Lepidoptera
- Family: Gelechiidae
- Genus: Dichomeris
- Species: D. deceptella

Binomial name
- Dichomeris deceptella (Snellen, 1903)

Synonyms
- Malacotrichia deceptella Snellen, 1903

Species of moth

Dichomeris deceptella is a moth in the family Gelechiidae. It was described by Snellen in 1903. It is found on Java.

The wingspan is about 11 mm (0.43 in) for males and 12–13 mm (0.47–0.51 in) for females. The forewings are light grey with an elongate transverse black mark at one-third. The hindwings are dark grey.
