= Dichomeris evitata =

Scientific classification
- Domain: Eukaryota
- Kingdom: Animalia
- Phylum: Arthropoda
- Class: Insecta
- Order: Lepidoptera
- Family: Gelechiidae
- Genus: Dichomeris
- Species: D. evitata

Binomial name
- Dichomeris evitata Walsingham, 1911

Species of moth

Dichomeris evitata is a moth in the family Gelechiidae. It was described by Thomas de Grey, 6th Baron Walsingham, in 1911. It is found in Panama.

The wingspan is about 15 mm (0.59 in). The forewings are dark greyish brown, with broad irregular broken lines of dark brown following the veins along the upper and lower edge of the cell, as well as above and beyond it. These form a spot-like shade a little before the termen below the apex, and another on the costa before the apex, the latter having a small pale costal spot at either extremity. The hindwings are umber-brown.
