= Dichomeris atriguttata =

Scientific classification
- Domain: Eukaryota
- Kingdom: Animalia
- Phylum: Arthropoda
- Class: Insecta
- Order: Lepidoptera
- Family: Gelechiidae
- Genus: Dichomeris
- Species: D. atriguttata

Binomial name
- Dichomeris atriguttata (Meyrick, 1931)

Synonyms
- Trichotaphe atriguttata Meyrick, 1931

Species of moth

Dichomeris atriguttata is a moth in the family Gelechiidae. It was described by Edward Meyrick in 1931. It is found in Paraguay.
