= Dichomeris rubiginosella =

Scientific classification
- Kingdom: Animalia
- Phylum: Arthropoda
- Clade: Pancrustacea
- Class: Insecta
- Order: Lepidoptera
- Family: Gelechiidae
- Genus: Dichomeris
- Species: D. rubiginosella

Binomial name
- Dichomeris rubiginosella (Walker, 1864)

Synonyms
- Cryptolechia rubiginosella Walker, 1864; Dichomeris ochropyga Walsingham, 1911

Species of moth

Dichomeris rubiginosella is a moth in the family Gelechiidae. It was described by Francis Walker in 1864. It is found in Mexico (Tabasco, Veracruz), Peru and Amazonas, Brazil.

The wingspan is about 15 mm. The forewings are tawny reddish brown, the costa narrowly ochreous from the base to the apex. A slight oblique chestnut shade rests on the fold at one-third of its length pointing inward, and is succeeded by a dark brown spot in the fold above and scarcely before which is a similar dark brown discal spot succeeded by another at the end of the cell. About seven minute brownish shade spots lie around the apex and termen. The hindwings are dark umber brown.
