= Dichomeris arotrosema =

Scientific classification
- Domain: Eukaryota
- Kingdom: Animalia
- Phylum: Arthropoda
- Class: Insecta
- Order: Lepidoptera
- Family: Gelechiidae
- Genus: Dichomeris
- Species: D. arotrosema

Binomial name
- Dichomeris arotrosema Walsingham, 1911

Species of moth

Dichomeris arotrosema is a moth in the family Gelechiidae. It was described by Thomas de Grey, 6th Baron Walsingham, in 1911. It is found in Mexico (Veracruz).

The wingspan is 17–22 mm (0.67–0.87 in). The forewings are dark chocolate-brown along the dorsum to two-fifths, this colour being diffused upward and outward obliquely, nearly reaching the costa beyond the middle, blending on its outer side into dark tawny fuscous, which embraces the whole outer half of the wing and cilia, but is slightly sprinkled with pale cinereous scales leaving a large pale tawny patch at the base of the costa, attenuate outward to a little beyond the middle. There is a small pale tawny dorsal spot before the tornus. The hindwings are dark brown.
