= Dichomeris thermodryas =

Scientific classification
- Kingdom: Animalia
- Phylum: Arthropoda
- Class: Insecta
- Order: Lepidoptera
- Family: Gelechiidae
- Genus: Dichomeris
- Species: D. thermodryas

Binomial name
- Dichomeris thermodryas Meyrick, 1923

Species of moth

Dichomeris thermodryas is a moth in the family Gelechiidae. It was described by Edward Meyrick in 1923. It is found in Peru.

The wingspan is 13–14 mm (0.51–0.55 in). The forewings are fuscous, speckled with ochreous whitish. The stigmata are moderate, dark brown, the plical beneath the first discal, the second discal transverse. There is a hardly curved denticulate light brownish-ochreous subterminal line, edged posteriorly by dark brown. There is also a marginal series of dark fuscous dots separated with light ochreous around part of the costa and termen. The hindwings are rather dark grey.
