= Dichomeris bitinctella =

Scientific classification
- Kingdom: Animalia
- Phylum: Arthropoda
- Class: Insecta
- Order: Lepidoptera
- Family: Gelechiidae
- Genus: Dichomeris
- Species: D. bitinctella

Binomial name
- Dichomeris bitinctella (Walker, 1864)

Synonyms
- Oecophora bitinctella Walker, 1864

Species of moth

Dichomeris bitinctella is a moth in the family Gelechiidae. It was described by Francis Walker in 1864. It is found on Borneo.

Adults are ferruginous, the forewings tinged with chalybeous (steel blue), most prevalent along the costa and forming a band on the exterior border.
