= Dichomeris plexigramma =

Scientific classification
- Kingdom: Animalia
- Phylum: Arthropoda
- Class: Insecta
- Order: Lepidoptera
- Family: Gelechiidae
- Genus: Dichomeris
- Species: D. plexigramma

Binomial name
- Dichomeris plexigramma Meyrick, 1922

Species of moth

Dichomeris plexigramma is a moth in the family Gelechiidae. It was described by Edward Meyrick in 1922. It is found in the Guianas, Peru and Amazonas, Brazil.

The wingspan is 18–20 mm (0.71–0.79 in). The forewings are pale ochreous, variably streaked with dark brown suffusion between the veins, more strongly in the disc and forming oblique wedge-shaped streaks in the cell. There is sometimes a pale shade near and parallel to the termen. The hindwings are dark grey.
