= Dichomeris testudinata =

Scientific classification
- Kingdom: Animalia
- Phylum: Arthropoda
- Class: Insecta
- Order: Lepidoptera
- Family: Gelechiidae
- Genus: Dichomeris
- Species: D. testudinata

Binomial name
- Dichomeris testudinata Meyrick, 1934

Species of moth

Dichomeris testudinata is a moth in the family Gelechiidae. It was described by Edward Meyrick in 1934. It is found in Guangdong, China.
