= Dichomeris acritopa =

Scientific classification
- Kingdom: Animalia
- Phylum: Arthropoda
- Class: Insecta
- Order: Lepidoptera
- Family: Gelechiidae
- Genus: Dichomeris
- Species: D. acritopa

Binomial name
- Dichomeris acritopa Meyrick, 1935

Synonyms
- Dichomeris acritopa Meyrick, 1935

Species of moth

Dichomeris acritopa is a moth of the family Gelechiidae. It was described by Edward Meyrick in 1935. It is known from the Chinese provinces of Shanxi, Shaanxi, Zhejiang and Yunnan.
