= Dichomeris ampliata =

Scientific classification
- Kingdom: Animalia
- Phylum: Arthropoda
- Class: Insecta
- Order: Lepidoptera
- Family: Gelechiidae
- Genus: Dichomeris
- Species: D. ampliata

Binomial name
- Dichomeris ampliata Meyrick, 1913

Synonyms
- Gaesa ampliata Meyrick, 1925

Species of moth

Dichomeris ampliata is a moth of the family Gelechiidae. It was described by Edward Meyrick in 1913. It is known from north-eastern India and Sri Lanka.

The wingspan is 22–23 mm. The forewings are violet fuscous, with the extreme costal edge pale ochreous except towards the base. The stigmata are obscure, dark fuscous, the discal approximated and the plical slightly before the first discal. There is a series of dark fuscous dots around the posterior part of the costa and termen. The hindwings are fuscous.
