= Dichomeris paenitens =

Scientific classification
- Kingdom: Animalia
- Phylum: Arthropoda
- Class: Insecta
- Order: Lepidoptera
- Family: Gelechiidae
- Genus: Dichomeris
- Species: D. paenitens

Binomial name
- Dichomeris paenitens (Meyrick, 1923)

Synonyms
- Pachysaris paenitens Meyrick, 1923

Species of moth

Dichomeris paenitens is a moth in the family Gelechiidae. It was described by Edward Meyrick in 1923. It is found in Amazonas, Brazil.

The wingspan is about 15 mm (0.59 in). The forewings are rather dark grey. The stigmata is small, obscure, dark fuscous, with the plical slightly beyond the first discal. The hindwings (including neural pectens) are grey.
