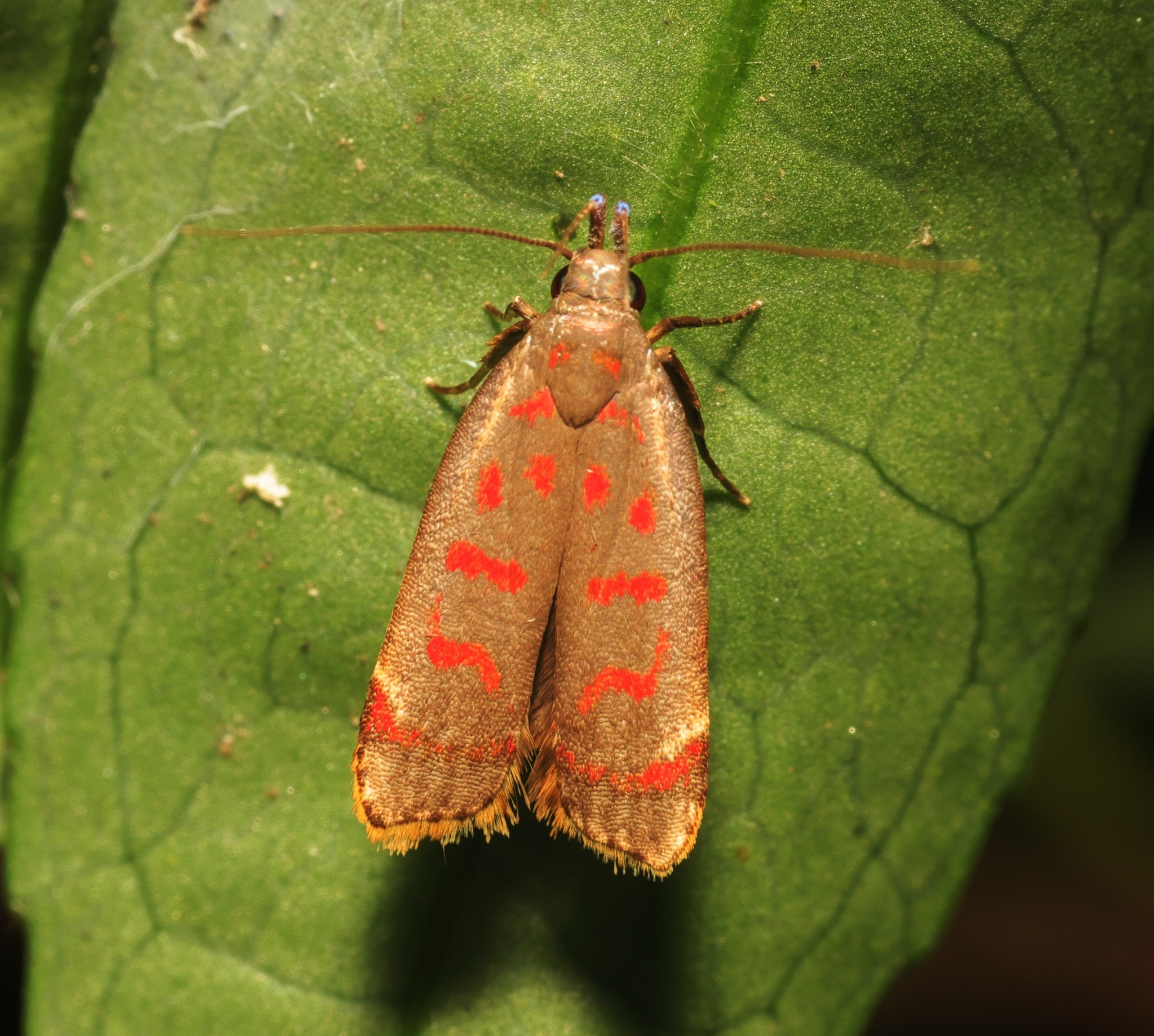

Scientific classification
- Kingdom: Animalia
- Phylum: Arthropoda
- Class: Insecta
- Order: Lepidoptera
- Family: Gelechiidae
- Genus: Dichomeris
- Species: D. sandycitis

Binomial name
- Dichomeris sandycitis (Meyrick, 1907)

Synonyms
- Anorthosia sandycitis Meyrick, 1907

= Dichomeris sandycitis =

Species of moth

Dichomeris sandycitis is a moth in the family Gelechiidae. It was described by Edward Meyrick in 1907. It is found in China (Hong Kong) and India.

The wingspan is 14–16.5 mm.
