= Dichomeris brachyptila =

Scientific classification
- Kingdom: Animalia
- Phylum: Arthropoda
- Class: Insecta
- Order: Lepidoptera
- Family: Gelechiidae
- Genus: Dichomeris
- Species: D. brachyptila

Binomial name
- Dichomeris brachyptila Meyrick, 1916

Species of moth

Dichomeris brachyptila is a moth in the family Gelechiidae. It was described by Edward Meyrick in 1916. It is found in Myanmar and Java, Indonesia.

The wingspan is about 9 mm (0.35 in). The forewings are light yellow ochreous, irregularly clouded and marbled with grey suffusion, the costa minutely speckled with dark fuscous. The stigmata are blackish, the plical somewhat before the first discal. The hindwings are pale grey.
