= Dichomeris cinnabarina =

Scientific classification
- Kingdom: Animalia
- Phylum: Arthropoda
- Class: Insecta
- Order: Lepidoptera
- Family: Gelechiidae
- Genus: Dichomeris
- Species: D. cinnabarina

Binomial name
- Dichomeris cinnabarina (Meyrick, 1923)

Synonyms
- Musurga cinnabarina Meyrick, 1923

Species of moth

Dichomeris cinnabarina is a moth in the family Gelechiidae. It was described by Edward Meyrick in 1923. It is found in Sri Lanka.

The wingspan is about 19 mm (0.75 in). The forewings are pale violet brownish with orange-red markings, consisting of a subdorsal dash near the base, a small spot above the fold at one-sixth and one beneath the fold beyond this, a suffused oblique streak from the disc at one-fourth to the plical stigma, small spots representing the stigmata, the plical slightly before the first discal, the second discal expanded into a spot of suffusion above and connected by an irregular suffused streak with the dorsum before the tornus, some slight suffusion following a faint paler slightly bent subterminal line becoming whitish on the costa. There are dark fuscous marginal dots on the veins around the posterior part of the costa and termen. The hindwings are dark grey and rather thinly scaled.
