= Dichomeris renascens =

Scientific classification
- Domain: Eukaryota
- Kingdom: Animalia
- Phylum: Arthropoda
- Class: Insecta
- Order: Lepidoptera
- Family: Gelechiidae
- Genus: Dichomeris
- Species: D. renascens

Binomial name
- Dichomeris renascens Walsingham, 1911

Species of moth

Dichomeris renascens is a moth in the family Gelechiidae. It was described by Thomas de Grey, 6th Baron Walsingham, in 1911. It is found in Mexico (Tabasco).

The wingspan is about 15 mm (0.59 in). The forewings are brownish cinereous, with a somewhat broken pale ochreous line along the costa, traceable, although somewhat diluted, around the apex and termen at the base of the pale cinereous cilia. There is a small fuscous spot below the costa at about one-sixth from the base, below and beyond it a large chocolate-brown patch covers the whole middle portion of the fold and extends upward and outward less widely to the upper edge of the cell. An elongate brown spot marks the cross vein at the end of the cell, and a pale cinereous line, slightly curved inward, cuts off the apical sixth of the wing from the costa to the dorsum. A broken line of the darker shade of the ground-colour runs along the termen, and a pale spot is located at the lower edge of the brown patch below the fold. The hindwings are umber-brown.
