= Dichomeris versicolorella =

Scientific classification
- Kingdom: Animalia
- Phylum: Arthropoda
- Class: Insecta
- Order: Lepidoptera
- Family: Gelechiidae
- Genus: Dichomeris
- Species: D. versicolorella

Binomial name
- Dichomeris versicolorella (Walker, 1864)

Synonyms
- Tocmia versicolorella Walker, 1864

Species of moth

Dichomeris versicolorella is a moth in the family Gelechiidae. It was described by Francis Walker in 1864. It is found in Amazonas, Brazil.

Adults are blackish cupreous, the forewings purplish cupreous with a blackish stripe. The hindwings are cupreous.
