= Dichomeris carinella =

Scientific classification
- Domain: Eukaryota
- Kingdom: Animalia
- Phylum: Arthropoda
- Class: Insecta
- Order: Lepidoptera
- Family: Gelechiidae
- Genus: Dichomeris
- Species: D. carinella

Binomial name
- Dichomeris carinella Walsingham, 1911

Species of moth

Dichomeris carinella is a moth in the family Gelechiidae. It was described by Thomas de Grey, 6th Baron Walsingham, in 1911. It is found in Mexico (Guerrero).

The wingspan is about 18 mm (0.71 in). The forewings are very pale fawn-ochreous, profusely dusted with fawn-brown throughout, slightly paler towards the apex and with an ill-defined outwardly angulate band from the commencement of the costal cilia to the commencement of the dorsal cilia, the costa before it being somewhat more darkly shaded than the remainder of the wing, corresponding in colour to four slightly indicated shade-spots—one on the upper edge of the fold at about one-seventh of the wing-length, one on the middle of the cell, and one at its outer extremity, with another on the fold slightly beyond the middle one. About six dark marginal dots lie around the apex and termen before the pale fawn-ochreous cilia, of which the outer half is darker than the basal. The hindwings are tawny brownish grey.
