= Dichomeris ellipsias =

Scientific classification
- Kingdom: Animalia
- Phylum: Arthropoda
- Class: Insecta
- Order: Lepidoptera
- Family: Gelechiidae
- Genus: Dichomeris
- Species: D. ellipsias

Binomial name
- Dichomeris ellipsias Meyrick, 1922

Species of moth

Dichomeris ellipsias is a moth in the family Gelechiidae. It was described by Edward Meyrick in 1922. It is found in Peru.

The wingspan is about 11 mm (0.43 in). The forewings are rather dark grey with a rather oblique transverse elliptical blackish blotch at one-third, yellowish edged, nearly reaching the dorsum, not nearly reaching the costa. There is also a round blackish-yellowish-edged spot in the disc before three-fourths, as well as a moderately broad blackish fascia from three-fourths of the costa to the tornus, anteriorly edged by a yellow-ochreous line indented in the middle. There are also triangular blackish marginal dots around the apex and termen, separated anteriorly with ochreous whitish. The hindwings are dark grey.
