= Dichomeris synclepta =

Scientific classification
- Kingdom: Animalia
- Phylum: Arthropoda
- Class: Insecta
- Order: Lepidoptera
- Family: Gelechiidae
- Genus: Dichomeris
- Species: D. synclepta

Binomial name
- Dichomeris synclepta (Meyrick, 1938)

Synonyms
- Chthonogenes synclepta Meyrick, 1938

Species of moth

Dichomeris synclepta is a moth in the family Gelechiidae. It was described by Edward Meyrick in 1938. It is found in Yunnan, China.
