= Dichomeris zomias =

Scientific classification
- Kingdom: Animalia
- Phylum: Arthropoda
- Class: Insecta
- Order: Lepidoptera
- Family: Gelechiidae
- Genus: Dichomeris
- Species: D. zomias

Binomial name
- Dichomeris zomias Meyrick, 1914

Species of moth

Dichomeris zomias is a moth in the family Gelechiidae. It was described by Edward Meyrick in 1914. It is found in Guyana and Brazil.

The wingspan is 13–15 mm (0.51–0.59 in). The forewings are ferruginous brown, with some scattered dark fuscous scales. The stigmata is obscure, cloudy, fuscous or darker, sometimes forming elongate spots. The dorsal half of the wing is sometimes much obscured with dark fuscous irroration (sprinkling) partially concealing these. There is an almost marginal streak of dark fuscous suffusion just before the termen, strongest upwards. The hindwings are dark grey.
