= Dichomeris cyclospila =

Scientific classification
- Kingdom: Animalia
- Phylum: Arthropoda
- Class: Insecta
- Order: Lepidoptera
- Family: Gelechiidae
- Genus: Dichomeris
- Species: D. cyclospila

Binomial name
- Dichomeris cyclospila (Meyrick, 1918)

Synonyms
- Trichotaphe cyclospila Meyrick, 1918

Species of moth

Dichomeris cyclospila is a moth in the family Gelechiidae. It was described by Edward Meyrick in 1918. It is found in French Guiana.

The wingspan is about 16 mm (0.63 in). The forewings are pale ochreous, the costal edge pinkish tinged and with dark reddish-fuscous dots above and below the fold at one-fifth. The stigmata are represented by small round dark reddish-fuscous spots obscurely edged with whitish, the first discal largest, the plical beneath the first discal. There is an irregular curved and sinuate indistinct pale line from three-fourths of the costa to the dorsum before the tornus and there are marginal blackish dots around the posterior part of the costa and termen. The hindwings are dark grey.
