= Dichomeris intentella =

Scientific classification
- Kingdom: Animalia
- Phylum: Arthropoda
- Class: Insecta
- Order: Lepidoptera
- Family: Gelechiidae
- Genus: Dichomeris
- Species: D. intentella

Binomial name
- Dichomeris intentella (Walker, 1864)

Synonyms
- Gelechia intentella Walker, 1864

Species of moth

Dichomeris intentella is a moth in the family Gelechiidae. It was described by Francis Walker in 1864. It is found in Peru and Amazonas, Brazil.

Adults are gilded ochraceous and have forewings with four irregular purplish bands. The first and third are interrupted, the first basal and the second forked in front. The fourth is connected on the interior border with the third. A row of black points is along the apical part of the costa and the exterior border.
