= Dichomeris caryoplecta =

Scientific classification
- Kingdom: Animalia
- Phylum: Arthropoda
- Class: Insecta
- Order: Lepidoptera
- Family: Gelechiidae
- Genus: Dichomeris
- Species: D. caryoplecta

Binomial name
- Dichomeris caryoplecta (Meyrick, 1930)

Synonyms
- Myrophila caryoplecta Meyrick, 1930

Species of moth

Dichomeris caryoplecta is a moth in the family Gelechiidae. It was described by Edward Meyrick in 1930. It is found in Pará, Brazil.

The wingspan is 16–17 mm (0.63–0.67 in).
