= Dichomeris hexasticta =

Scientific classification
- Domain: Eukaryota
- Kingdom: Animalia
- Phylum: Arthropoda
- Class: Insecta
- Order: Lepidoptera
- Family: Gelechiidae
- Genus: Dichomeris
- Species: D. hexasticta

Binomial name
- Dichomeris hexasticta Walsingham, 1911

Species of moth

Dichomeris hexasticta is a moth in the family Gelechiidae. It was described by Thomas de Grey, 6th Baron Walsingham, in 1911. It is found in Mexico (Guerrero).

The wingspan is about 18 mm (0.71 in). The forewings are pale straw-ochreous, with a black spot at the extreme base which is produced outward in a thin line along the costa, nearly to the middle, and is narrowly margined beneath with whitish ochreous. Before the middle of the wing is a group of four conspicuous black spots, three on the cell arranged as an equilateral triangle with the apex outward, the fourth on the fold below and a little beyond the lower of the three. Beyond these at the end of the cell are two similar spots, the upper a little beyond the lower and there is a series of six to eight much smaller black spots along the termen and around the apex. The hindwings are greyish cinereous.
