= Dichomeris ostracodes =

Scientific classification
- Kingdom: Animalia
- Phylum: Arthropoda
- Class: Insecta
- Order: Lepidoptera
- Family: Gelechiidae
- Genus: Dichomeris
- Species: D. ostracodes

Binomial name
- Dichomeris ostracodes Meyrick, 1916

Species of moth

Dichomeris ostracodes is a moth in the family Gelechiidae. It was described by Edward Meyrick in 1916. It is found in Myanmar and on Java in Indonesia.

The wingspan is about 14 mm (0.55 in). The forewings are brownish ochreous with the costa irregularly strigulated with dark fuscous from near the base to the middle and with a dark fuscous triangular blotch on the costa beyond the middle, reaching one-third of the way across the wing. The stigmata are small, dark brownish, with the plical beneath the first discal, and with a faint brownish oblique fascia from one-fourth of the costa to these. There is also a narrow dark fuscous terminal fascia. The hindwings are grey.
