= Dichomeris procyphodes =

Scientific classification
- Kingdom: Animalia
- Phylum: Arthropoda
- Class: Insecta
- Order: Lepidoptera
- Family: Gelechiidae
- Genus: Dichomeris
- Species: D. procyphodes

Binomial name
- Dichomeris procyphodes Meyrick, 1922

Species of moth

Dichomeris procyphodes is a moth in the family Gelechiidae. It was described by Edward Meyrick in 1922. It is found in Amazonas, Brazil.

The wingspan is 15–16 mm (0.59–0.63 in). The forewings are rather dark purple, paler towards the costa anteriorly and with a dorsal streak of dark ferruginous-brown suffusion from near the base to beyond the middle. There is an oblique rather dark brown streak in the middle of the disc and a dark ferruginous-brown costal streak from two-fifths to the apex, attenuated anteriorly, on the posterior half suffused beneath and with the extreme costal edge whitish, anteriorly better defined by a streak of whitish-grey-ochreous suffusion. There is an indistinct small dark brownish spot on the end of the cell, the wing beyond this irregularly suffused with brownish. There is also a faint pale curved dentate subterminal line, edged posteriorly by darker suffusion and there is a dark ferruginous-fuscous marginal line around the apex and termen. The hindwings are grey, darker posteriorly.
