= Dichomeris permundella =

Scientific classification
- Kingdom: Animalia
- Phylum: Arthropoda
- Class: Insecta
- Order: Lepidoptera
- Family: Gelechiidae
- Genus: Dichomeris
- Species: D. permundella

Binomial name
- Dichomeris permundella (Walker, 1864)

Synonyms
- Gelechia permundella Walker, 1864; Gelechia tactella Walker, 1864

Species of moth

Dichomeris permundella is a moth in the family Gelechiidae. It was described by Francis Walker in 1864. It is found in Peru and Amazonas, Brazil.

Adults are slaty cinereous, the forewings with three cupreous-brown marks, the first and second bordered by cinereous. The first also forming an elongated spot, which rests on the interior border before the middle. The third forms a dot in the exterior disc, bordered with cinereous on the inner side. The exterior border is pale fawn colour with black points.
