= Dichomeris diacrita =

Scientific classification
- Domain: Eukaryota
- Kingdom: Animalia
- Phylum: Arthropoda
- Class: Insecta
- Order: Lepidoptera
- Family: Gelechiidae
- Genus: Dichomeris
- Species: D. diacrita

Binomial name
- Dichomeris diacrita (Diakonoff, [1968])

Synonyms
- Atasthalistis diacrita Diakonoff, [1968]

Species of moth

Dichomeris diacrita is a moth in the family Gelechiidae. It was described by Alexey Diakonoff in 1968. It is found on Luzon in the Philippines.

== Description ==
The wingspan is about 14.5 mm. The forewings are light milky green with blackish and white markings. There is a transverse series of small blackish scales at one-fifth and another similar transverse series from below two-thirds of the costa, as well as a short transverse mark on the dorsum beyond the middle. The hindwings are dark bronze blackish fuscous.
