= Dichomeris sacricola =

Scientific classification
- Kingdom: Animalia
- Phylum: Arthropoda
- Class: Insecta
- Order: Lepidoptera
- Family: Gelechiidae
- Genus: Dichomeris
- Species: D. sacricola

Binomial name
- Dichomeris sacricola (Meyrick, 1922)

Synonyms
- Zalitha sacricola Meyrick, 1922

Species of moth

Dichomeris sacricola is a moth in the family Gelechiidae. It was described by Edward Meyrick in 1922. It is found in Peru and Amazonas, Brazil.

The wingspan is 12–13 mm (0.47–0.51 in). The forewings are glossy dark indigo-blue leaden with an orange oblong blotch on the dorsum beyond the middle, the upper angles with rather diverging fasciate lobes not reaching the costa, the posterior including a transverse-linear dark fuscous mark. There is an angulated orange transverse line at four-fifths, and narrow orange terminal fascia, these are sometimes suffused together or with the anterior portion in the disc variably suffused with dark fuscous, sometimes with dark fuscous dots on marginal edge. The hindwings are dark fuscous.
