= Dichomeris charonaea =

Scientific classification
- Kingdom: Animalia
- Phylum: Arthropoda
- Class: Insecta
- Order: Lepidoptera
- Family: Gelechiidae
- Genus: Dichomeris
- Species: D. charonaea

Binomial name
- Dichomeris charonaea (Meyrick, 1913)

Synonyms
- Hypelictis charonaea Meyrick, 1913

Species of moth

Dichomeris charonaea is a moth in the family Gelechiidae. It was described by Edward Meyrick in 1913. It is found in Sri Lanka.

The wingspan is 13–14 mm (0.51–0.55 in). The forewings are dark purplish fuscous, with a leaden gloss sprinkled with blackish but without other defined markings. The hindwings are fuscous.
