= Dichomeris euparypha =

Scientific classification
- Kingdom: Animalia
- Phylum: Arthropoda
- Class: Insecta
- Order: Lepidoptera
- Family: Gelechiidae
- Genus: Dichomeris
- Species: D. euparypha

Binomial name
- Dichomeris euparypha (Meyrick, 1922)

Synonyms
- Trichotaphe euparypha Meyrick, 1922

Species of moth

Dichomeris euparypha is a moth in the family Gelechiidae. It was described by Edward Meyrick in 1922. It is found in Peru.

The wingspan is about 11 mm (0.43 in). The forewings are deep blue purple with the basal third with three or four light ochreous longitudinal streaks more or less expressed. There are transverse dark fuscous blotches in the disc before and beyond the middle, more or less edged with orange yellowish and there is an orange streak on the posterior part of the fold more or less expressed. The posterior area from the second discal blotch to the termen is orange, with more or less developed dark fuscous streaks on the veins, and a variable dark fuscous apical blotch extending over most of the termen. The hindwings are dark fuscous.
