= Dichomeris amphicoma =

Scientific classification
- Kingdom: Animalia
- Phylum: Arthropoda
- Class: Insecta
- Order: Lepidoptera
- Family: Gelechiidae
- Genus: Dichomeris
- Species: D. amphicoma

Binomial name
- Dichomeris amphicoma Meyrick, 1912

Species of moth

Dichomeris amphicoma is a moth in the family Gelechiidae. It was described by Edward Meyrick in 1912. It is found in São Paulo, Brazil.

The wingspan is about 21 mm (0.83 in). The forewings are light ochreous-brownish, strewn with dark fuscous strigulae and with a blackish streak suffused with darker brown running from the base of the dorsum to the costa just above the apex. The costal area above this is paler ochreous. The hindwings are grey.
