= Dichomeris vetustella =

Scientific classification
- Kingdom: Animalia
- Phylum: Arthropoda
- Class: Insecta
- Order: Lepidoptera
- Family: Gelechiidae
- Genus: Dichomeris
- Species: D. vetustella

Binomial name
- Dichomeris vetustella (Walker, 1864)

Synonyms
- Paepia vetustella Walker, 1864

Species of moth

Dichomeris vetustella is a moth in the family Gelechiidae. It was described by Francis Walker in 1864. It is found in Amazonas, Brazil.

Adults are greenish gold-brown, the forewings cinereous towards the tips and with cinereous veins, as well as three yellowish subcostal slightly oblique lines. There is also an irregular red line along the end of the disc. The hindwings are greenish gold-cinereous.
