= Dichomeris ardesiella =

Scientific classification
- Domain: Eukaryota
- Kingdom: Animalia
- Phylum: Arthropoda
- Class: Insecta
- Order: Lepidoptera
- Family: Gelechiidae
- Genus: Dichomeris
- Species: D. ardesiella

Binomial name
- Dichomeris ardesiella Walsingham, 1911

Species of moth

Dichomeris ardesiella is a moth in the family Gelechiidae. It was described by Thomas de Grey, 6th Baron Walsingham, in 1911. It is found in Mexico (Veracruz).

The wingspan is about 15 mm (0.59 in). The forewings are dark greyish fuscous, with a slight purplish gloss. The extreme costa is very narrowly edged with ochreous as far as the commencement of the costal cilia, where a slight, very pale ochreous shade is projected downward on the wing-surface, apparently indicating the line of a vanished fascia. A minute blackish spot, at the extreme base of the costa, is followed by another, sometimes obsolete, on the cell at one-fifth, and beyond this, in the same line, is another discal spot at two-fifths, followed by another at the end of the cell, from which descends a short, inwardly bowed line of similarly dark scales. There is another dark spot in the fold, below the median discal spot, preceded and followed by a few ochreous scales, of which a very few are also found connected with the two outer discal spots. A few blackish scales occur along the termen before the faintly sub-ochreous base of the smoky grey cilia. The hindwings are smoky dark leaden grey.
