= Dichomeris chalinopis =

Scientific classification
- Domain: Eukaryota
- Kingdom: Animalia
- Phylum: Arthropoda
- Class: Insecta
- Order: Lepidoptera
- Family: Gelechiidae
- Genus: Dichomeris
- Species: D. chalinopis

Binomial name
- Dichomeris chalinopis (Meyrick, 1935)

Synonyms
- Trichotaphe chalinopis Meyrick, 1935

Species of moth

Dichomeris chalinopis is a moth in the family Gelechiidae. It was described by Edward Meyrick in 1935. It is found in Argentina.
