= Dichomeris stratigera =

Scientific classification
- Kingdom: Animalia
- Phylum: Arthropoda
- Class: Insecta
- Order: Lepidoptera
- Family: Gelechiidae
- Genus: Dichomeris
- Species: D. stratigera

Binomial name
- Dichomeris stratigera Meyrick, 1922

Species of moth

Dichomeris stratigera is a moth in the family Gelechiidae. It was described by Edward Meyrick in 1922. It is found in Amazonas, Brazil.

The wingspan is about 14 mm (0.55 in). The forewings are pale purplish lilac with a streak of ochreous-yellow suffusion beneath the costa from the base to near the middle and a dark fuscous streak occupying the dorsal two-fifths of the wing throughout, its upper portion marked with a thick deep ferruginous streak from the base to the middle, where it forms a short triangular prominence upwards. The second discal stigma is ferruginous and there is a faint pale curved subterminal line edged ferruginous posteriorly. The hindwings are dark grey.
