= Dichomeris habrochitona =

Scientific classification
- Domain: Eukaryota
- Kingdom: Animalia
- Phylum: Arthropoda
- Class: Insecta
- Order: Lepidoptera
- Family: Gelechiidae
- Genus: Dichomeris
- Species: D. habrochitona

Binomial name
- Dichomeris habrochitona Walsingham, 1911

Species of moth

Dichomeris habrochitona is a moth in the family Gelechiidae. It was described by Thomas de Grey, 6th Baron Walsingham, in 1911. It is found in Panama.

The wingspan is about 16 mm (0.63 in). The forewings are ochreous, a dark, steely greyish fuscous shade runs along the costa from the base nearly to the apex, except on the extreme costa which is very narrowly pale ochreous toward the base. Along the lower edge of this shade the wing is streaked and sprinkled with reddish brown, and this, with a few reddish scales above it, forms an indistinct sub-ocelloid spot at a little more than one-third from the base. Below this, and again a little beyond it, a few reddish brown scales are sprinkled across the wing, joining some slender length-streaks of the same colour on the dorsal area. There are a few indistinct groups of brownish scales along the termen before the pale ochreous cilia. The hindwings are greyish fuscous, iridescent along the cell.
