= Dichomeris themelia =

Scientific classification
- Kingdom: Animalia
- Phylum: Arthropoda
- Clade: Pancrustacea
- Class: Insecta
- Order: Lepidoptera
- Family: Gelechiidae
- Genus: Dichomeris
- Species: D. themelia

Binomial name
- Dichomeris themelia (Meyrick, 1913)

Synonyms
- Trichotaphe themelia Meyrick, 1913

Species of moth

Dichomeris themelia is a moth in the family Gelechiidae. It was described by Edward Meyrick in 1913. It is found in São Paulo, Brazil.

The wingspan is about 17 mm (0.67 in). The forewings are rather dark purplish fuscous with a pale brownish-ochreous patch occupying the costal half of the wing from the base to three-fourths, indented by a large irregular-trapezoidal blackish blotch from the dorsum before the middle reaching two-thirds across the wing, and an irregular trilobed blackish blotch in the disc at two-thirds. The hindwings are fuscous.
