= Dichomeris argigastra =

Scientific classification
- Domain: Eukaryota
- Kingdom: Animalia
- Phylum: Arthropoda
- Class: Insecta
- Order: Lepidoptera
- Family: Gelechiidae
- Genus: Dichomeris
- Species: D. argigastra

Binomial name
- Dichomeris argigastra Walsingham, 1911

Species of moth

Dichomeris argigastra is a moth in the family Gelechiidae. It was described by Thomas de Grey, 6th Baron Walsingham, in 1911. It is found in Mexico (Veracruz).

The wingspan is about 13 mm (0.51 in). The forewings are chestnut-brown, a greyish fuscous shade, commencing at the base, occupies the space between the costa and the fold and is attenuated outward and upward from the middle of the fold, breaking at its outer extremity into lines which follow the costal veins nearly to the apex. On this shade are three yellowish ochreous lines, one commencing at the base and running to the middle of the costa, the other two beyond it running from the cell nearly to the costa. The terminal and dorsal veins are indicated by narrow greyish fuscous lines, of which there is a slight shade also around the apex before the chestnut-brown cilia. The hindwings are greyish brown.
