= Dichomeris turrita =

Scientific classification
- Kingdom: Animalia
- Phylum: Arthropoda
- Class: Insecta
- Order: Lepidoptera
- Family: Gelechiidae
- Genus: Dichomeris
- Species: D. turrita

Binomial name
- Dichomeris turrita (Meyrick, 1914)

Synonyms
- Trichotaphe turrita Meyrick, 1914

Species of moth

Dichomeris turrita is a moth in the family Gelechiidae. It was described by Edward Meyrick in 1914. It is found in Guyana and Brazil.

The wingspan is 15–17 mm (0.59–0.67 in). The forewings are pale fuscous with a large blackish transverse blotch, edged with whitish, occupying the median third of the dorsum, the upper edge projecting furthest posteriorly, where it reaches four-fifths of the way across the wing. The second discal stigma is round, blackish and whitish edged and there is an indistinct rather irregular ochreous-whitish line from two-thirds of the costa to the dorsum before the tornus, edged with fuscous posteriorly. There is a series of dark fuscous dots around the posterior third of the costa and termen. The hindwings are rather dark grey.
