= Dichomeris moriutii =

Scientific classification
- Kingdom: Animalia
- Phylum: Arthropoda
- Class: Insecta
- Order: Lepidoptera
- Family: Gelechiidae
- Genus: Dichomeris
- Species: D. moriutii

Binomial name
- Dichomeris moriutii Ponomarenko & Ueda, 2004

Species of moth

Dichomeris moriutii is a moth in the family Gelechiidae. It was described by Ponomarenko and Ueda in 2004. It is found in China (Hong Kong, Gansu, Guangxi, Guizhou, Hunan, Zhejiang) and Thailand.

The wingspan is 10.5–16 mm.
