= Dichomeris memnonia =

Scientific classification
- Kingdom: Animalia
- Phylum: Arthropoda
- Class: Insecta
- Order: Lepidoptera
- Family: Gelechiidae
- Genus: Dichomeris
- Species: D. memnonia

Binomial name
- Dichomeris memnonia (Meyrick, 1913)

Synonyms
- Trichotaphe memnonia Meyrick, 1913

Species of moth

Dichomeris memnonia is a moth in the family Gelechiidae. It was described by Edward Meyrick in 1913. It is found in Rio de Janeiro, Brazil.

The wingspan is about 15 mm (0.59 in). The forewings are dark ashy purplish fuscous with bronzy-blackish markings, as well as an oblique transverse bar in the disc at one-fourth, not reaching the margins. There is also a broad cloudy transverse median fascia and a moderately broad fascia from four-fifths of the costa to the tornus. There is also a narrow terminal fascia. The hindwings are dark fuscous.
