= Dichomeris tristicta =

Scientific classification
- Domain: Eukaryota
- Kingdom: Animalia
- Phylum: Arthropoda
- Class: Insecta
- Order: Lepidoptera
- Family: Gelechiidae
- Genus: Dichomeris
- Species: D. tristicta

Binomial name
- Dichomeris tristicta Busck, 1914

Species of moth

Dichomeris tristicta is a moth in the family Gelechiidae. It was described by August Busck in 1914. It is found in Panama.

The wingspan is about 14 mm. The forewings are light ochreous brown with a round black dot in the middle of the cell, another at the end of the cell and a similar one on the fold, all slightly edged with reddish brown. The base of the coastal edge black and there is a series of small black dots around the apical edge. The hindwings are dark brownish fuscous.
