= Dichomeris subdentata =

Scientific classification
- Kingdom: Animalia
- Phylum: Arthropoda
- Class: Insecta
- Order: Lepidoptera
- Family: Gelechiidae
- Genus: Dichomeris
- Species: D. subdentata

Binomial name
- Dichomeris subdentata Meyrick, 1922

Species of moth

Dichomeris subdentata is a moth in the family Gelechiidae. It was described by Edward Meyrick in 1922. It is found in Pará, Brazil.

The wingspan is about 10 mm (0.39 in). The forewings are leaden grey with a triangular blackish finely white-edged blotch from the dorsum before the middle, nearly reaching the costa. There is a round blackish finely white-edged spot in the disc touching the posterior fascia and also a broad blackish fascia from three-fourths of the costa to the tornus, edged anteriorly by a fine white hardly oblique line. There is also an irregular blackish marginal line around the apex and termen preceded by a white line. The hindwings are dark fuscous.
