= Dichomeris simaoensis =

Scientific classification
- Kingdom: Animalia
- Phylum: Arthropoda
- Class: Insecta
- Order: Lepidoptera
- Family: Gelechiidae
- Genus: Dichomeris
- Species: D. simaoensis

Binomial name
- Dichomeris simaoensis H.-H. Li & H.-J. Wang, 1997

Species of moth

Dichomeris simaoensis is a moth in the family Gelechiidae. It was described by Hou-Hun Li and Hong-Jian Wang in 1997. It is found in China (Hong Kong, Tibet, Yunnan) and Thailand.

The wingspan is 18–21 mm.
