= Dichomeris phaeostrota =

Scientific classification
- Kingdom: Animalia
- Phylum: Arthropoda
- Class: Insecta
- Order: Lepidoptera
- Family: Gelechiidae
- Genus: Dichomeris
- Species: D. phaeostrota

Binomial name
- Dichomeris phaeostrota (Meyrick, 1923)

Synonyms
- Rhynchotona phaeostrota Meyrick, 1923

Species of moth

Dichomeris phaeostrota is a moth in the family Gelechiidae. It was described by Edward Meyrick in 1923. It is found in Peru.

The wingspan is about 10 mm (0.39 in). The forewings are greyish ochreous speckled with dark fuscous and with an indistinct small cloudy dark fuscous spot in the disc at one-fourth. The plical and second discal stigmata are small and blackish. The hindwings are rather dark grey.
