= Dichomeris tactica =

Scientific classification
- Kingdom: Animalia
- Phylum: Arthropoda
- Class: Insecta
- Order: Lepidoptera
- Family: Gelechiidae
- Genus: Dichomeris
- Species: D. tactica

Binomial name
- Dichomeris tactica Meyrick, 1918

Species of moth

Dichomeris tactica is a moth in the family Gelechiidae. It was described by Edward Meyrick in 1918. It is found in Ecuador.

The wingspan is 11–12 mm (0.43–0.47 in). The forewings are grey irrorated (sprinkled) with whitish and blackish. The stigmata is cloudy and black, the plical is beneath the first discal. There are cloudy black marginal dots around the posterior part of the costa and termen. The hindwings are grey.
