= Dichomeris aurisulcata =

Scientific classification
- Kingdom: Animalia
- Phylum: Arthropoda
- Class: Insecta
- Order: Lepidoptera
- Family: Gelechiidae
- Genus: Dichomeris
- Species: D. aurisulcata

Binomial name
- Dichomeris aurisulcata (Meyrick, 1922)

Synonyms
- Trichotaphe aurisulcata Meyrick, 1922

Species of moth

Dichomeris aurisulcata is a moth in the family Gelechiidae. It was described by Edward Meyrick in 1922. It is found in Amazonas, Brazil.

The wingspan is 11–12 mm (0.43–0.47 in). The forewings are dark violet fuscous, the costa more blue tinged and with variable more or less expressed ochreous-yellow or orange streaks between the veins, sometimes only slightly indicated, one along the fold sometimes strong. There is a roundish dark fuscous blotch in the disc before the middle, and a sub-oblique transverse blotch at three-fifths, these are sometimes partially edged with orange or wholly orange. The terminal edge is orange. The hindwings are dark fuscous.
