= Dichomeris adelocentra =

Scientific classification
- Kingdom: Animalia
- Phylum: Arthropoda
- Class: Insecta
- Order: Lepidoptera
- Family: Gelechiidae
- Genus: Dichomeris
- Species: D. adelocentra

Binomial name
- Dichomeris adelocentra Meyrick, 1920

Species of moth

Dichomeris adelocentra is a moth of the family Gelechiidae. It was described by Edward Meyrick in 1920. It is known from Java in Indonesia.

The wingspan is about 12 mm. The forewings are greyish ochreous with the stigmata obscure, indistinct and fuscous, the plical rather obliquely before the first discal. There is a small blackish-grey elongate mark on the middle of the costa, preceded and followed by ochreous-whitish suffusion and there is a fine blackish-grey marginal line around the apex, and two or three dark grey dots separated by whitish on each side of it. The hindwings are slate grey.

The larvae feed on Bridelia tomentosa.
