= Dichomeris dolichaula =

Scientific classification
- Domain: Eukaryota
- Kingdom: Animalia
- Phylum: Arthropoda
- Class: Insecta
- Order: Lepidoptera
- Family: Gelechiidae
- Genus: Dichomeris
- Species: D. dolichaula

Binomial name
- Dichomeris dolichaula Meyrick, 1931

Species of moth

Dichomeris dolichaula is a moth in the family Gelechiidae. It was described by Edward Meyrick in 1931. It is found in Cameroon.
