= Dichomeris punctatella =

Scientific classification
- Kingdom: Animalia
- Phylum: Arthropoda
- Class: Insecta
- Order: Lepidoptera
- Family: Gelechiidae
- Genus: Dichomeris
- Species: D. punctatella

Binomial name
- Dichomeris punctatella (Walker, 1864)

Synonyms
- Rhobonda punctatella Walker, 1864

Species of moth

Dichomeris punctatella is a moth in the family Gelechiidae. It was described by Francis Walker in 1864. It is found in Amazonas, Brazil.

Adults are ferruginous, the wings narrow with a short fringe and the forewings slightly acute with a convex exterior border.
