= Dichomeris syringota =

Scientific classification
- Kingdom: Animalia
- Phylum: Arthropoda
- Class: Insecta
- Order: Lepidoptera
- Family: Gelechiidae
- Genus: Dichomeris
- Species: D. syringota

Binomial name
- Dichomeris syringota (Meyrick, 1926)

Synonyms
- Trichotaphe syringota Meyrick, 1926

Species of moth

Dichomeris syringota is a moth in the family Gelechiidae. It was described by Edward Meyrick in 1926. It is found in Peru.

The wingspan is about 15 mm (0.59 in). The forewings are rather dark grey with a broad costal band at the base occupying half of the wing but attenuated to a point at three-fourths, grey whitish mottled with grey, the dorsal area towards the base is also similarly suffused and between these a streak of blackish-fuscous suffusion along the fold from about one-sixth to two-fifths, with some undefined dark fuscous suffusion extending from this beneath the costal band to beyond the middle. There is a whitish dot on the end of the cell followed by a transverse fascia of obscure whitish irroration (sprinkling) terminated by a more distinct rather curved shade. The hindwings are grey, thinly scaled towards the base.
