= Dichomeris retracta =

Scientific classification
- Kingdom: Animalia
- Phylum: Arthropoda
- Class: Insecta
- Order: Lepidoptera
- Family: Gelechiidae
- Genus: Dichomeris
- Species: D. retracta

Binomial name
- Dichomeris retracta (Meyrick, 1922)

Synonyms
- Trichotaphe retracta Meyrick, 1922

Species of moth

Dichomeris retracta is a moth in the family Gelechiidae. It was described by Edward Meyrick in 1922. It is found in Brazil (Para).

The wingspan is 13–14 mm (0.51–0.55 in). The forewings are rather dark grey, more or less suffusedly irrorated with whitish-ochreous with a blackish-fuscous flattened-triangular spot above the fold towards the base, and a rather oblique rhomboidal blotch in the disc before the middle united by a suffused streak along the fold. There are two faint darker dots transversely placed on the end of the cell, as well as a dark terminal fascia formed by the absence of pale irroration, limited by an obscure pale line from three-fourths of the costa to the dorsum before the tornus, obtusely angulated near the costa. The hindwings are grey.
