= Dichomeris caryophragma =

Scientific classification
- Kingdom: Animalia
- Phylum: Arthropoda
- Class: Insecta
- Order: Lepidoptera
- Family: Gelechiidae
- Genus: Dichomeris
- Species: D. caryophragma

Binomial name
- Dichomeris caryophragma (Meyrick, 1923)

Synonyms
- Myrophila caryophragma Meyrick, 1923

Species of moth

Dichomeris caryophragma is a moth in the family Gelechiidae. It was described by Edward Meyrick in 1923. It is found in Guyana and Pará, Brazil.

The wingspan is 20–23 mm (0.79–0.91 in). The forewings are ferruginous ochreous, suffused with ferruginous-brown costal and subcostal streaks confluent posteriorly and not reaching the apex. The costal edge is suffused with dark fuscous and there are two ferruginous-brown dots obliquely placed in the disc at one-third, sometimes absorbed in the subcostal streak. There is also an inwards-oblique streak from the subcostal streak before the middle to the dorsum concealing the anterior stigmata, a shorter less oblique streak on the end of the cell, and two hardly curved obscure shades enclosing a subterminal shade of ground colour. A marginal series of blackish triangular dots is found around the apex and termen. The hindwings are dark fuscous.
