= Dichomeris ingloria =

Scientific classification
- Kingdom: Animalia
- Phylum: Arthropoda
- Class: Insecta
- Order: Lepidoptera
- Family: Gelechiidae
- Genus: Dichomeris
- Species: D. ingloria

Binomial name
- Dichomeris ingloria Meyrick, 1923

Species of moth

Dichomeris ingloria is a moth in the family Gelechiidae. It was described by Edward Meyrick in 1923. It is found in Peru.

The wingspan is 12–13 mm (0.47–0.51 in). The forewings are ochreous grey whitish suffusedly irrorated (sprinkled) with grey or fuscous. The stigmata are dark fuscous, the plical rather obliquely before the first discal. The hindwings are light grey.
