= Dichomeris cinnamicostella =

Scientific classification
- Kingdom: Animalia
- Phylum: Arthropoda
- Clade: Pancrustacea
- Class: Insecta
- Order: Lepidoptera
- Family: Gelechiidae
- Genus: Dichomeris
- Species: D. cinnamicostella

Binomial name
- Dichomeris cinnamicostella (Zeller, 1877)

Synonyms
- Epicorthylis cinnamicostella Zeller, 1877

Species of moth

Dichomeris cinnamicostella is a moth in the family Gelechiidae. It was described by Philipp Christoph Zeller in 1877. It is found in Panama.
