= Dichomeris sevectella =

Scientific classification
- Kingdom: Animalia
- Phylum: Arthropoda
- Class: Insecta
- Order: Lepidoptera
- Family: Gelechiidae
- Genus: Dichomeris
- Species: D. sevectella

Binomial name
- Dichomeris sevectella (Walker, 1864)

Synonyms
- Gelechia sevectella Walker, 1864; Ilingiotis sevectella

Species of moth

Dichomeris sevectella is a moth in the family Gelechiidae. It was described by Francis Walker in 1864. It is found in Guyana and Amazonas, Brazil.

The wingspan is 10–14 mm. The forewings are light grey, strigulated with darker and somewhat mixed with ochreous whitish. The costa is broadly suffused with ochreous whitish from the base to three-fourths, the costal edge blackish towards the base. There is a small black spot towards the costa near the base. The stigmata are represented by round blackish spots edged with whitish, the plical smaller, slightly beyond the first discal. There is also a black dot or mark on the costa at three-fifths and a curved whitish line from the costa beyond this to the tornus, as well as an ochreous-whitish line around the posterior part of the costa and termen, marked with a series of blackish dots. The hindwings are rather dark grey.
