= Dichomeris olivescens =

Scientific classification
- Kingdom: Animalia
- Phylum: Arthropoda
- Class: Insecta
- Order: Lepidoptera
- Family: Gelechiidae
- Genus: Dichomeris
- Species: D. olivescens

Binomial name
- Dichomeris olivescens Meyrick, 1913

Species of moth

Dichomeris olivescens is a moth in the family Gelechiidae. It was described by Edward Meyrick in 1913. It is found in Sri Lanka.

The wingspan is 21–22 mm (0.83–0.87 in). The forewings are pale ochreous, with a faint greenish tinge, indistinctly strigulated with brownish except towards the costa anteriorly. The anterior three-fifths of the costa are closely marked with black dots or short strigulae. The stigmata are dark brown, more or less edged with white posteriorly, and with the discal approximated and the plical rather before the first discal. There is a small dark brown spot on the costa at three-fourths, and one on the dorsum towards the tornus. A series of dark brown or blackish dots are found on the termen and posterior part of the costa. The hindwings are dark fuscous.
