= Dichomeris matsumurai =

Scientific classification
- Kingdom: Animalia
- Phylum: Arthropoda
- Class: Insecta
- Order: Lepidoptera
- Family: Gelechiidae
- Genus: Dichomeris
- Species: D. matsumurai

Binomial name
- Dichomeris matsumurai Ponomarenko & Ueda, 2004

Species of moth

Dichomeris matsumurai is a moth in the family Gelechiidae. It was described by Ponomarenko and Ueda in 2004. It is found in Thailand.

The wingspan is 20–21.5 mm (0.79–0.85 in).

== Etymology ==
The species is named for Prof. T. Matsumura.
