= Dichomeris viridescens =

Scientific classification
- Kingdom: Animalia
- Phylum: Arthropoda
- Class: Insecta
- Order: Lepidoptera
- Family: Gelechiidae
- Genus: Dichomeris
- Species: D. viridescens

Binomial name
- Dichomeris viridescens (Meyrick, 1918)

Synonyms
- Zalithia viridescens Meyrick, 1918; Hyperecta viridescens Meyrick, 1918

Species of moth

Dichomeris viridescens is a moth in the family Gelechiidae. It was described by Edward Meyrick in 1918. It is found in Assam, India.

The wingspan is about 12 mm (0.47 in). The forewings are lilac grey with a dark purplish median streak from the base to one-fourth and a greyish-blue blotch in the disc at one-third, extending suffusedly almost to the dorsum. There is a broad rather oblique greyish-blue fasciate patch in the disc beyond the middle, extending nearly to the margins. The discal space before this and a fascia beyond it are rather dark purplish fuscous with deep emerald-green reflections. Beyond this is a metallic-blue trapezoidal blotch occupying the apical and terminal areas, preceded on the costa by a triangular blackish spot before which is a white mark. The hindwings are dull ochreous, the apical fourth suffused with dark fuscous and with a large basal patch of modified light grey fine scales.
