= Dichomeris vigilans =

Scientific classification
- Kingdom: Animalia
- Phylum: Arthropoda
- Class: Insecta
- Order: Lepidoptera
- Family: Gelechiidae
- Genus: Dichomeris
- Species: D. vigilans

Binomial name
- Dichomeris vigilans (Meyrick, 1914)

Synonyms
- Ilingiotis vigilans Meyrick, 1914

Species of moth

Dichomeris vigilans is a moth in the family Gelechiidae. It was described by Edward Meyrick in 1914. It is found in Guyana.

The wingspan is 9–11 mm (0.35–0.43 in). The forewings are light ochreous bronzy with a black dot on the base of the costa and an irregular black dot in the disc at one-fourth. The stigmata is black, the discal large and pale edged, with the plical small, beneath the first discal. There is a whitish-ochreous spot on the costa at three-fourths, where a slightly curved indistinct whitish-ochreous line runs to the tornus. There is also a row of black dots around the posterior part of the costa and termen. The hindwings are dark grey.
