= Dichomeris acrolychna =

Scientific classification
- Kingdom: Animalia
- Phylum: Arthropoda
- Class: Insecta
- Order: Lepidoptera
- Family: Gelechiidae
- Genus: Dichomeris
- Species: D. acrolychna

Binomial name
- Dichomeris acrolychna Meyrick, 1922

Species of moth

Dichomeris acrolychna is a moth in the family Gelechiidae. It was described by Edward Meyrick in 1922. It is found in Pará, Brazil. The wingspan is 9–11 mm (0.35–0.43 in). The forewings are rather dark ashy fuscous, obscurely whitish speckled. The stigmata are dark fuscous or ferruginous brown, the plical somewhat beyond the first discal. There is a curved dark ferruginous-brown subterminal shade sometimes perceptible. The hindwings are dark grey.
