= Dichomeris carycina =

Scientific classification
- Kingdom: Animalia
- Phylum: Arthropoda
- Class: Insecta
- Order: Lepidoptera
- Family: Gelechiidae
- Genus: Dichomeris
- Species: D. carycina

Binomial name
- Dichomeris carycina (Meyrick, 1914)

Synonyms
- Trichotaphe carycina Meyrick, 1914; Myrophila carycina

Species of moth

Dichomeris carycina is a moth in the family Gelechiidae. It was described by Edward Meyrick in 1914. It is found in Guyana and Brazil.

The wingspan is 17–20 mm (0.67–0.79 in). The forewings are brownish ochreous, sprinkled with ferruginous-brown strigulae and with the base dark fuscous. The costal edge is partially suffused with dark ferruginous brown and there is a ferruginous-brown slightly oblique fascia from the middle of the dorsum extending three-fourths of the way across the wing, with the posterior edge undefined. The apex includes an elongate rather dark fuscous spot and there is a slightly oblique transverse ferruginous-brown mark on the end of the cell, as well as blackish marginal dots around the apex and termen. The hindwings are rather dark grey.
