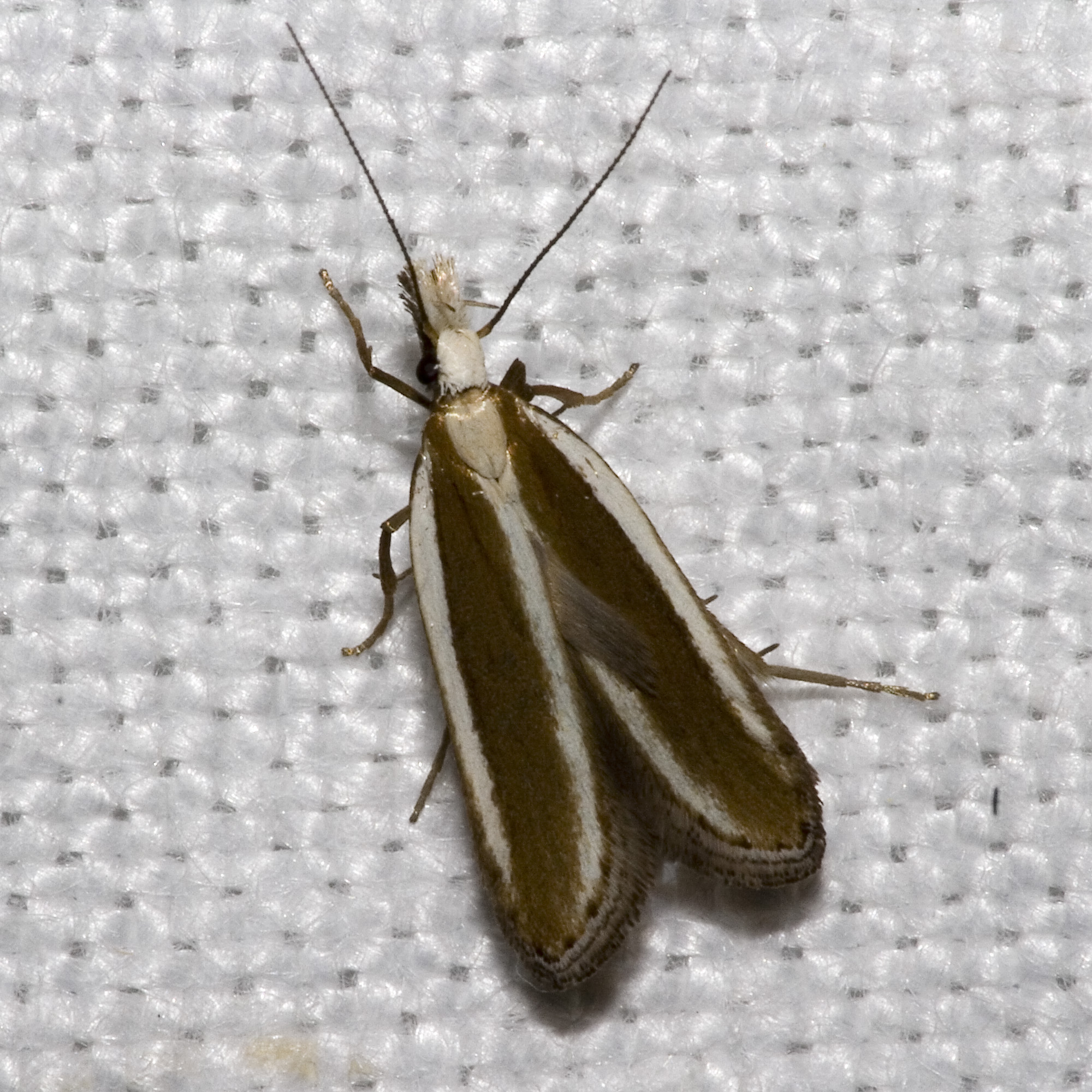
- Dichomeris marginella

Scientific classification
- Kingdom: Animalia
- Phylum: Arthropoda
- Clade: Pancrustacea
- Class: Insecta
- Order: Lepidoptera
- Family: Gelechiidae
- Subfamily: Dichomeridinae
- Genus: Dichomeris; Hübner, 1818

Synonyms
- Acribologa Meyrick, 1923; Ageliarchis Meyrick, 1923; Anorthosia Clemens, 1860; Aphnogenes Meyrick, 1921; Arotria Meyrick, 1904; Atasthalistis Meyrick, 1886; Begoe Chambers, 1872; Brochometis Meyrick, 1923; Carbatina Meyrick, 1913; Catelaphris Meyrick, 1925; Catoptristis Meyrick, 1925; Cerycangela Meyrick, 1925; Chthonogenes Meyrick, 1938; Cotyloscia Meyrick, 1923; Croesopola Meyrick, 1904; Cymatoplicella T. B. Fletcher, 1940; Cymotricha Meyrick, 1923; Daemonarcha Meyrick, 1918; Deimnestra Meyrick, 1918; Deltolophos Janse, 1960; Desmophylax Meyrick, 1935; Epicharta Meyrick, 1926; Epicorthylis Zeller, 1873; Eporgastis Meyrick, 1921; Ereboscaeas Meyrick, 1937; Eurysara Turner, 1919; Euryzancla Turner, 1919; Gaesa Walker, 1864; Holaxyra Meyrick, 1913; Hylograptis Meyrick, 1910; Hypelictis Meyrick, 1905; Ilingiotis Meyrick, 1914; Iochares Meyrick, 1921; Leuropalpa Janse, 1960; Machlotricha Meyrick, 1912; Macrozancla Turner, 1919; Malacotricha Zeller, 1873; Musurga Meyrick, 1923; Myrophila Meyrick, 1923; Mythographa Meyrick, 1923; Neochrista Meyrick, 1923; Neopachnistis Janse, 1954; Orsodytis Meyrick, 1926; Oxybelia Hübner, 1825; Oxysactis Meyrick, 1923; Pachysaris Meyrick, 1914; Pappophorus Walsingham, 1897; Parabrachmia Janse, 1960; Paranoea Walsingham, 1911; Paristhmia Meyrick, 1909; Picroptera Janse, 1960; Plocamosaris Meyrick, 1912; Prasodryas Meyrick, 1926; Prophoraula Meyrick, 1922; Rhadinophylla Turner, 1919; Rhinosia Treitschke, 1833; Rhynchotona Meyrick, 1923; Sathrogenes Meyrick, 1923; Schematistis Meyrick, 1911; Semiomeris Meyrick, 1923; Sirogenes Meyrick, 1923; Taphrosaris Meyrick, 1922; Thelyasceta Meyrick, 1923; Thyrsomnestis Meyrick, 1929; Tocmia Walker, 1864; Trichotaphe Clemens, 1860; Uliaria Dumont, 1921; Vazugada Walker, 1864; Xenorrhythma Meyrick, 1926; Zalithia Meyrick, 1894; Zomeutis Meyrick, 1913; Eupolis Meyrick, 1923 (preocc. Pickard-Cambridge, 1900); Eupolella T. B. Fletcher, 1940

= Dichomeris =

Genus of moths

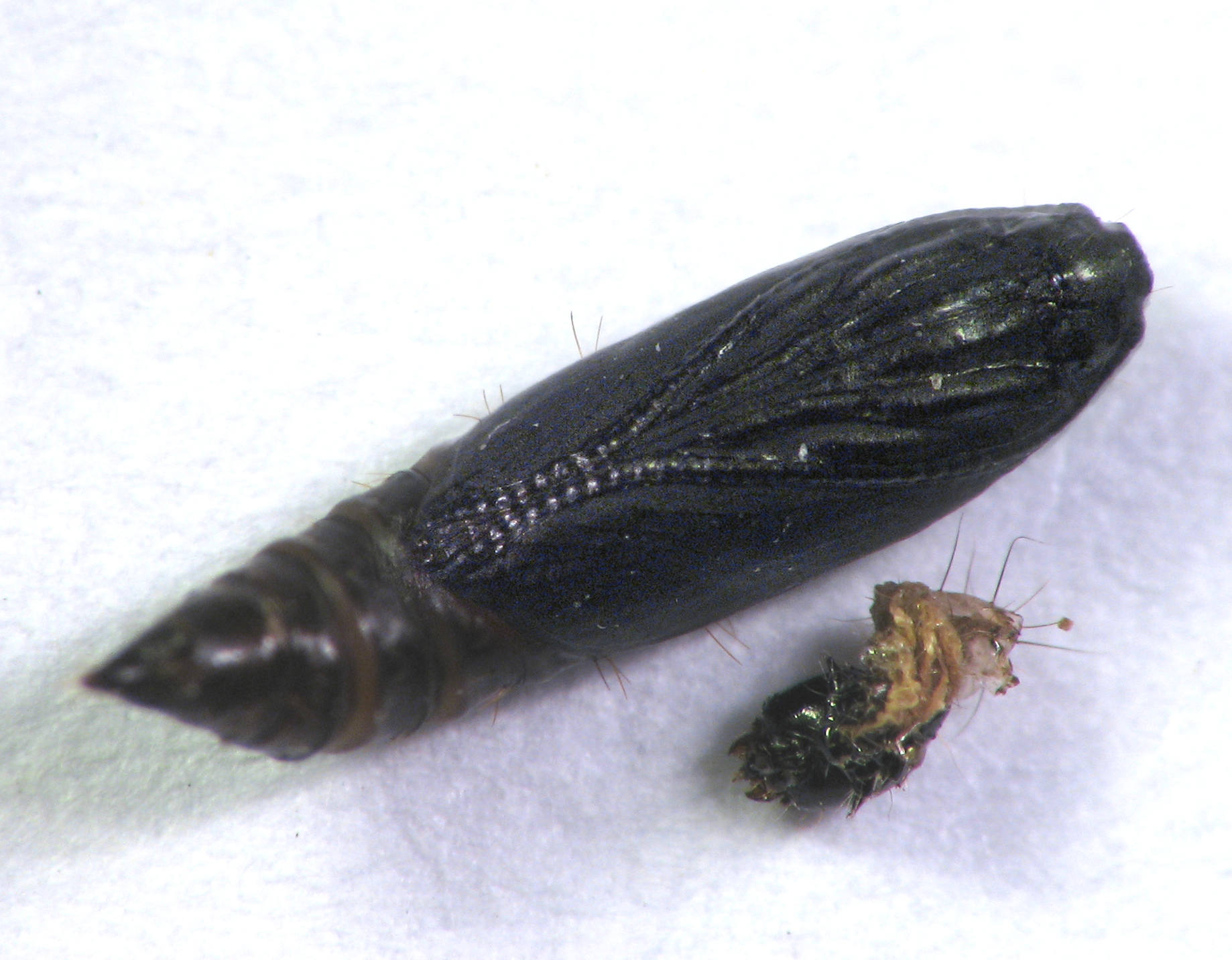
Dichomeris inserrata pupa

Dichomeris is a genus of moths in the family Gelechiidae erected by Jacob Hübner in 1818.

== Selected species ==
- ligulella species group
  - Dichomeris ligulella Hübner, 1818
  - Dichomeris gausapa Hodges, 1986
- acuminata species group
  - Dichomeris acuminatus (Staudinger, 1876)
  - Dichomeris nenia Hodges, 1986
- condaliavorella species group
  - Dichomeris condaliavorella (Busck, 1900)
- citrifoliella species group
  - Dichomeris blanchardorum Hodges, 1986
  - Dichomeris citrifoliella (Chambers, 1880)
  - Dichomeris carycina (Meyrick, 1914)
  - Dichomeris caryophragma (Meyrick, 1923)
  - Dichomeris diacnista (Meyrick, 1923)
- marginella species group
  - Dichomeris marginella (Fabricius, 1781)
  - Dichomeris juniperella (Linnaeus, 1761)
- solatrix species group
  - Dichomeris solatrix Hodges, 1986
- hypochloa species group
  - Dichomeris hypochloa Walsingham, 1911
  - Dichomeris sacricola (Meyrick, 1922)
  - Dichomeris thanatopsis (Lower, 1901)
- punctipennella species group
  - Dichomeris punctipennella (Clemens, 1860)
- punctidiscella species group
  - Dichomeris punctidiscellus (Clemens, 1863)
  - Dichomeris diva Hodges, 1986
  - Dichomeris sylphe Hodges, 1986
  - Dichomeris empusa Hodges, 1986
  - Dichomeris indigna (Walsingham, 1892)
  - Dichomeris lypetica Walsingham, 1911
- hirculella species group
  - Dichomeris hirculella Busck, 1909
  - Dichomeris caia Hodges, 1986
  - Dichomeris ardelia Hodges, 1986
  - Dichomeris tactica Meyrick, 1918
- siren species group
  - Dichomeris siren Hodges, 1986
  - Dichomeris latescens (Walsingham, 1911)
  - Dichomeris ceratomoxantha (Meyrick, 1929)
- flavocostella species group
  - Dichomeris flavocostella (Clemens, 1860)
  - Dichomeris fistuca Hodges, 1986
- inversella species group
  - Dichomeris inversella (Zeller, 1873)
  - Dichomeris kimballi Hodges, 1986
- ventrella species group
  - Dichomeris ventrellus (Fitch, 1854)
  - Dichomeris georgiella (Walker, 1866)
  - Dichomeris vacciniella Busck, 1915
  - Dichomeris bipunctellus (Walsingham, 1882)
  - Dichomeris atomogypsa (Meyrick, 1932)
  - Dichomeris sparsellus (Christoph, 1882)
  - Dichomeris tostella Stringer, 1930
- setosella species group
  - Dichomeris setosella (Clemens, 1860)
  - Dichomeris vindex Hodges, 1986
  - Dichomeris mulsa Hodges, 1986
  - Dichomeris mica Hodges, 1986
  - Dichomeris aglaia Hodges, 1986
  - Dichomeris delotella Busck, 1909
  - Dichomeris gleba Hodges, 1986
  - Dichomeris alphito Hodges, 1986
  - Dichomeris laetitia Hodges, 1986
  - Dichomeris stipendiaria (Braun, 1925)
  - Dichomeris bilobella (Zeller, 1873)
  - Dichomeris aleatrix Hodges, 1986
  - Dichomeris copa Hodges, 1986
  - Dichomeris scrutaria Hodges, 1986
  - Dichomeris furia Hodges, 1986
  - Dichomeris purpureofusca (Walsingham, 1882)
  - Dichomeris nonstrigella (Chambers, 1878)
  - Dichomeris ochripalpella (Zeller, 1873)
  - Dichomeris achne Hodges, 1986
  - Dichomeris inserrata (Walsingham, 1882)
  - Dichomeris pelta Hodges, 1986
  - Dichomeris bolize Hodges, 1986
  - Dichomeris legnotoa Hodges, 1986
  - Dichomeris illusio Hodges, 1986
  - Dichomeris mimesis Hodges, 1986
  - Dichomeris serrativittella (Zeller, 1873)
  - Dichomeris xanthoa Hodges, 1986
  - Dichomeris isa Hodges, 1986
  - Dichomeris simulata Hodges, 1986
  - Dichomeris imitata Hodges, 1986
  - Dichomeris barnesiella (Busck, 1907)
  - Dichomeris simpliciella (Busck, 1904)
  - Dichomeris baxa Hodges, 1986
  - Dichomeris gnoma Hodges, 1986
  - Dichomeris washingtoniella (Busck, 1906)
  - Dichomeris levisella (Fyles, 1904)
  - Dichomeris leuconotella (Busck, 1904)
  - Dichomeris mercatrix Hodges, 1986
  - Dichomeris euprepes Hodges, 1986
  - Dichomeris juncidella (Clemens, 1860)
- glenni species group
  - Dichomeris glenni Clarke, 1947
  - Dichomeris acritopa Meyrick, 1935
  - Dichomeris acrochlora (Meyrick, 1905)
- costarufoella species group
  - Dichomeris costarufoella (Chambers, 1874)
  - Dichomeris agonia Hodges, 1986
  - Dichomeris offula Hodges, 1986
  - Dichomeris crepida Hodges, 1986
  - Dichomeris melanophylla (Turner, 1919)
  - Dichomeris chlorophracta Meyrick, 1921
- heriguronis species group
  - Dichomeris heriguronis (Matsumura, 1931)
- sybilla species group
  - Dichomeris sybilla Hodges, 1986
- Acanthophila species group (often treated as a valid genus)
- unplaced to species group
  - Dichomeris abscessella (Walker, 1863)
  - Dichomeris achlyodes (Meyrick, 1904)
  - Dichomeris acmodeta (Meyrick, 1931)
  - Dichomeris acratopa (Meyrick, 1926)
  - Dichomeris acrochlora (Meyrick, 1905)
  - Dichomeris acrogypsa Turner, 1919
  - Dichomeris acrolychna Meyrick, 1922
  - Dichomeris aculata Park, 2001
  - Dichomeris adactella (Walker, 1864)
  - Dichomeris adelocentra Meyrick, 1920
  - Dichomeris aenigmatica (Clarke, 1962)
  - Dichomeris aequata Meyrick, 1914
  - Dichomeris aestuosa (Meyrick, 1913)
  - Dichomeris agathopa Meyrick, 1921
  - Dichomeris agorastis (Meyrick, 1931)
  - Dichomeris albiscripta (Meyrick, 1914)
  - Dichomeris albula Park & Hodges, 1995
  - Dichomeris allantopa Meyrick, 1934
  - Dichomeris alogista Meyrick, 1935
  - Dichomeris amauropis (Meyrick, 1923)
  - Dichomeris amblopis (Janse, 1954)
  - Dichomeris amblychroa (Janse, 1954)
  - Dichomeris amblystola (Janse, 1954)
  - Dichomeris amorpha (Meyrick, 1937)
  - Dichomeris amphichlora (Meyrick, 1923)
  - Dichomeris amphicoma Meyrick, 1912
  - Dichomeris amphicosma (Meyrick, 1930)
  - Dichomeris ampliata Meyrick, 1913
  - Dichomeris ampycota (Meyrick, 1913)
  - Dichomeris analoxa (Meyrick, 1911)
  - Dichomeris angulata Park & Hodges, 1995
  - Dichomeris anisacuminata Li & Zheng, 1996
  - Dichomeris anisospila Meyrick, 1934
  - Dichomeris anomala (Janse, 1960)
  - Dichomeris anticrates (Meyrick, 1931)
  - Dichomeris antiloxa (Meyrick, 1931)
  - Dichomeris antisticha Meyrick, 1926
  - Dichomeris antisticta (Meyrick, 1929)
  - Dichomeris antizella Viette, 1986
  - Dichomeris antizyga Meyrick, 1913
  - Dichomeris aomoriensis Park & Hodges, 1995
  - Dichomeris aphanopa Meyrick, 1921
  - Dichomeris apicispina Li & Zheng, 1996
  - Dichomeris aplectodes (Janse, 1960)
  - Dichomeris apludellus (Lederer, 1869)
  - Dichomeris aprica (Meyrick, 1913)
  - Dichomeris ardesiella Walsingham, 1911
  - Dichomeris argentaria Meyrick, 1913
  - Dichomeris argentenigera Li, Zhen & Kendrick, 2010
  - Dichomeris argentinellus (Berg, 1885)
  - Dichomeris argigastra Walsingham, 1911
  - Dichomeris arotrosema Walsingham, 1911
  - Dichomeris arquata Li, Zhen & Mey, 2013
  - Dichomeris asaphocosma (Meyrick, 1934)
  - Dichomeris asodes Meyrick, 1939
  - Dichomeris asteropis Meyrick, 1921
  - Dichomeris atactodes (Janse, 1954)
  - Dichomeris atricornis (Meyrick, 1934)
  - Dichomeris atriguttata (Meyrick, 1931)
  - Dichomeris attenta Meyrick, 1921
  - Dichomeris aulotoma Meyrick, 1917
  - Dichomeris aurisulcata (Meyrick, 1922)
  - Dichomeris autometra (Meyrick, 1934)
  - Dichomeris autophanta (Meyrick, 1921)
  - Dichomeris badiolineariella Ponomarenko & Ueda, 2004
  - Dichomeris balioella Ponomarenko & Ueda, 2004
  - Dichomeris baccata Meyrick, 1923
  - Dichomeris barathrodes (Meyrick, 1909)
  - Dichomeris barbella (Denis & Schiffermüller, 1775)
  - Dichomeris barymochla (Meyrick, 1935)
  - Dichomeris bifurca Li & Zheng, 1996
  - Dichomeris biplagata Meyrick, 1931
  - Dichomeris bisignellus (Snellen, 1885)
  - Dichomeris bispotalis Walia & Wadhawan, 2004
  - Dichomeris bitinctella (Walker, 1864)
  - Dichomeris bodenheimeri (Rebel, 1926)
  - Dichomeris bomiensis Li & Zheng, 1996
  - Dichomeris brachygrapha Meyrick, 1920
  - Dichomeris brachymetra Meyrick, 1923
  - Dichomeris brachyptila Meyrick, 1916
  - Dichomeris brevicornuta Li, Zhen & Mey, 2013
  - Dichomeris bucinaria Park, 1996
  - Dichomeris bulawskii Ponomarenko & Park, 1996
  - Dichomeris byrsoxantha (Meyrick, 1918)
  - Dichomeris cachrydias Meyrick, 1914
  - Dichomeris caerulescens (Meyrick, 1913)
  - Dichomeris capillata (Walsingham, 1911)
  - Dichomeris capnites (Meyrick, 1904)
  - Dichomeris carinella Walsingham, 1911
  - Dichomeris caryoplecta (Meyrick, 1930)
  - Dichomeris castellana (Schmidt, 1941)
  - Dichomeris caustonota (Meyrick, 1914)
  - Dichomeris cellaria (Meyrick, 1913)
  - Dichomeris centracma (Meyrick, 1923)
  - Dichomeris ceponoma Meyrick, 1918
  - Dichomeris ceramoxantha (Meyrick, 1929)
  - Dichomeris chalcophaea Meyrick, 1921
  - Dichomeris chalinopis (Meyrick, 1935)
  - Dichomeris chalybitis (Meyrick, 1920)
  - Dichomeris charonaea (Meyrick, 1913)
  - Dichomeris chartaria (Meyrick, 1913)
  - Dichomeris chinganella (Christoph, 1882)
  - Dichomeris chlanidota (Meyrick, 1927)
  - Dichomeris christophi Ponomarenko & Mey, 2002
  - Dichomeris cinctella (Walker, 1864)
  - Dichomeris cinnabarina (Meyrick, 1923)
  - Dichomeris cinnamicostella (Zeller, 1877)
  - Dichomeris cirrhostola Turner, 1919
  - Dichomeris cisti (Staudinger, 1859)
  - Dichomeris citharista (Meyrick, 1913)
  - Dichomeris clarescens Meyrick, 1913
  - Dichomeris claviculata (Meyrick, 1909)
  - Dichomeris cocta (Meyrick, 1913)
  - Dichomeris coenulenta (Meyrick, 1927)
  - Dichomeris collina (Meyrick, 1914)
  - Dichomeris concinnalis (Feisthamel, 1839)
  - Dichomeris conclusa (Meyrick, 1918)
  - Dichomeris condylodes (Meyrick, 1921)
  - Dichomeris consertellus (Christoph, 1882)
  - Dichomeris contentella (Walker, 1864)
  - Dichomeris contrita (Meyrick, 1922)
  - Dichomeris corniculata (Meyrick, 1913)
  - Dichomeris costalis Busck, 1914
  - Dichomeris cotifera Meyrick, 1913
  - Dichomeris crambaleas (Meyrick, 1913)
  - Dichomeris craspedotis (Meyrick, 1937)
  - Dichomeris crepitatrix Meyrick, 1913
  - Dichomeris crossospila Meyrick, 1933
  - Dichomeris cuprea Li & Zheng, 1996
  - Dichomeris cuspis Park, 1994
  - Dichomeris cyanoneura (Meyrick, 1922)
  - Dichomeris cyclospila (Meyrick, 1918)
  - Dichomeris cymatodes (Meyrick, 1916)
  - Dichomeris cymotrocha (Meyrick, 1913)
  - Dichomeris cyprophanes (Meyrick, 1918)
  - Dichomeris davisi Park & Hodges, 1995
  - Dichomeris deceptella (Snellen, 1903)
  - Dichomeris decusella (Walker, 1864)
  - Dichomeris deltaspis (Meyrick, 1905)
  - Dichomeris deltoxyla (Meyrick, 1934)
  - Dichomeris dentata Li, Zhen & Mey, 2013
  - Dichomeris designatella (Walker, 1864)
  - Dichomeris derasella (Denis & Schiffermüller, 1775)
  - Dichomeris diacrita (Diakonoff, [1968])
  - Dichomeris dicausta (Meyrick, 1913)
  - Dichomeris diffurca Li & Zheng, 1996
  - Dichomeris dignella Walsingham, 1911
  - Dichomeris directa (Meyrick, 1912)
  - Dichomeris dolichaula Meyrick, 1931
  - Dichomeris doxarcha (Meyrick, 1916)
  - Dichomeris dryinodes (Lower, 1897)
  - Dichomeris dysnotata (Janse, 1954)
  - Dichomeris dysorata Turner, 1919
  - Dichomeris ebenosella (Viette, 1968)
  - Dichomeris elegans Park, 2001
  - Dichomeris ellipsias Meyrick, 1922
  - Dichomeris elliptica (Forbes, 1931)
  - Dichomeris enoptrias (Meyrick, 1911)
  - Dichomeris eosella (Viette, 1956)
  - Dichomeris eridantis (Meyrick, 1907)
  - Dichomeris erixantha (Meyrick, 1914)
  - Dichomeris eucomopa Meyrick, 1939
  - Dichomeris euparypha (Meyrick, 1922)
  - Dichomeris eurynotus (Walsingham, 1897)
  - Dichomeris eustacta Meyrick, 1921
  - Dichomeris evitata Walsingham, 1911
  - Dichomeris exallacta (Meyrick, 1926)
  - Dichomeris excavata Busck, 1914
  - Dichomeris excepta Meyrick, 1914
  - Dichomeris excoriata Meyrick, 1913
  - Dichomeris explicata (Meyrick, 1929)
  - Dichomeris exsecta Meyrick, 1927
  - Dichomeris externella (Zeller, 1852)
  - Dichomeris famosa (Meyrick, 1914)
  - Dichomeris famulata Meyrick, 1914
  - Dichomeris fareasta Park, 1994
  - Dichomeris ferrata Meyrick, 1913
  - Dichomeris ferrogra Li & Wang, 1997
  - Dichomeris ferruginosa Meyrick, 1913
  - Dichomeris festa (Meyrick, 1921)
  - Dichomeris fida Meyrick, 1923
  - Dichomeris finitima (Meyrick, 1921)
  - Dichomeris fluctuans (Meyrick, 1923)
  - Dichomeris fluitans Meyrick, 1920
  - Dichomeris formulata (Meyrick, 1922)
  - Dichomeris fracticostella (Walsingham, 1891)
  - Dichomeris frenigera (Meyrick, 1913)
  - Dichomeris fulvicilia (Meyrick, 1922)
  - Dichomeris fungifera (Meyrick, 1913)
  - Dichomeris furvellus (Zeller, 1852)
  - Dichomeris fusca Park & Hodges, 1995
  - Dichomeris fuscahopa Li & Zheng, 1996
  - Dichomeris fuscalis Park & Hodges, 1995
  - Dichomeris fuscanella (Caradja, 1920)
  - Dichomeris fuscodelta Walia & Wadhawan, 2004
  - Dichomeris fuscusitis Li & Zheng, 1996
  - Dichomeris gansuensis Li & Zheng, 1996
  - Dichomeris geochrota (Meyrick, 1914)
  - Dichomeris gnophrina (Felder & Rogenhofer, 1875)
  - Dichomeris gorgopa (Meyrick, 1918)
  - Dichomeris griseostola (Janse, 1960)
  - Dichomeris griseola (Janse, 1960)
  - Dichomeris habrochitona Walsingham, 1911
  - Dichomeris hamata (Janse, 1954)
  - Dichomeris hamulifera Li, Zhen & Kendrick, 2010
  - Dichomeris hansi Walia & Wadhawan, 2004
  - Dichomeris haplopa (Janse, 1960)
  - Dichomeris harmonias Meyrick, 1922
  - Dichomeris helianthemi (Walsingham, 1903)
  - Dichomeris hemeropa (Meyrick, 1923)
  - Dichomeris hemichrysella (Walker, 1863)
  - Dichomeris hercogramma (Meyrick, 1921)
  - Dichomeris heteracma Meyrick, 1923
  - Dichomeris hexasticta Walsingham, 1911
  - Dichomeris hodgesi Li & Zheng, 1996
  - Dichomeris holomela (Lower, 1897)
  - Dichomeris hoplocrates (Meyrick, 1932)
  - Dichomeris hortulana (Meyrick, 1918)
  - Dichomeris homaloxesta (Meyrick, 1921)
  - Dichomeris horiodes Meyrick, 1923
  - Dichomeris horocompsa Meyrick, 1933
  - Dichomeris horoglypta Meyrick, 1932
  - Dichomeris hylurga Meyrick, 1921
  - Dichomeris ignorata Meyrick, 1921
  - Dichomeris illicita (Meyrick, 1929)
  - Dichomeris illucescens (Meyrick, 1918)
  - Dichomeris imbricata Meyrick, 1913
  - Dichomeris immerita (Meyrick, 1913)
  - Dichomeris impigra Meyrick, 1913
  - Dichomeris inclusa (Meyrick, 1927)
  - Dichomeris indignus (Walsingham, [1892])
  - Dichomeris indiserta Meyrick, 1926
  - Dichomeris ingloria Meyrick, 1923
  - Dichomeris inspiciens (Meyrick, 1931)
  - Dichomeris instans Meyrick, 1923
  - Dichomeris intensa Meyrick, 1913
  - Dichomeris intentella (Walker, 1864)
  - Dichomeris introspiciens (Meyrick, 1926)
  - Dichomeris iodorus (Meyrick, 1904)
  - Dichomeris ironica (Meyrick, 1909)
  - Dichomeris isoclera (Meyrick, 1913)
  - Dichomeris issikii (Okada, 1961)
  - Dichomeris jiangxiensis Li & Zheng, 1996
  - Dichomeris jugata Walsingham, 1911
  - Dichomeris junisonensis Matsumura, 1931
  - Dichomeris kalesarensis Walia & Wadhawan, 2004
  - Dichomeris lamprostoma (Zeller, 1847)
  - Dichomeris lativalvata Li & Zheng, 1996
  - Dichomeris latipalpis (Walsingham, 1881)
  - Dichomeris leontovitchi (Ghesquière, 1940)
  - Dichomeris leptosaris Meyrick, 1932
  - Dichomeris lespedezae Park, 1994
  - Dichomeris leucocosma (Meyrick, 1916)
  - Dichomeris leucostena Walsingham, 1911
  - Dichomeris leucothicta Meyrick, 1919
  - Dichomeris levigata (Meyrick, 1913)
  - Dichomeris ligulacea Li, Zhen & Mey, 2013
  - Dichomeris ligyra (Meyrick, 1913)
  - Dichomeris limbipunctellus (Staudinger, 1859)
  - Dichomeris limosellus (Schläger, 1849)
  - Dichomeris linealis Park & Hodges, 1995
  - Dichomeris lissota (Meyrick, 1913)
  - Dichomeris litoxyla Meyrick, 1937
  - Dichomeris lividula Park & Hodges, 1995
  - Dichomeris loxonoma Meyrick, 1937
  - Dichomeris loxospila (Meyrick, 1932)
  - Dichomeris lucrifuga Meyrick, 1923
  - Dichomeris lupata (Meyrick, 1913)
  - Dichomeris lushanae Park & Hodges, 1995
  - Dichomeris lutea Park & Hodges, 1995
  - Dichomeris lutilinea Ponomarenko & Park, 1996
  - Dichomeris lutivittata Meyrick, 1921
  - Dichomeris lygropa (Lower, 1903)
  - Dichomeris macrosphena (Meyrick, 1913)
  - Dichomeris macroxyla (Meyrick, 1913)
  - Dichomeris malachias (Meyrick, 1913)
  - Dichomeris malacodes (Meyrick, 1910)
  - Dichomeris malthacopa (Meyrick, 1922)
  - Dichomeris manellus (Möschler, 1890)
  - Dichomeris manticopodina Li & Zheng, 1996
  - Dichomeris marginata (Walsingham, 1891)
  - Dichomeris matsumurai Ponomarenko & Ueda, 2004
  - Dichomeris marmoratus (Walsingham, 1891)
  - Dichomeris maturata (Meyrick, 1921)
  - Dichomeris melanortha Meyrick, 1929
  - Dichomeris melanosoma (Meyrick, 1920)
  - Dichomeris melanota Walsingham, 1911
  - Dichomeris melichrous (Meyrick, 1904)
  - Dichomeris melitura (Meyrick, 1916)
  - Dichomeris memnonia (Meyrick, 1913)
  - Dichomeris mengdana Li & Zheng, 1997
  - Dichomeris menglana Li & Zheng, 1996
  - Dichomeris meridionella (Walsingham, 1881)
  - Dichomeris mesoctenis Meyrick, 1921
  - Dichomeris mesoglena Meyrick, 1923
  - Dichomeris metatoxa (Meyrick, 1935)
  - Dichomeris metrodes Meyrick, 1913
  - Dichomeris metuens Meyrick, 1932
  - Dichomeris microdoxa (Meyrick, 1932)
  - Dichomeris microphanta (Meyrick, 1921)
  - Dichomeris microsphena Meyrick, 1921
  - Dichomeris millotella Viette, 1956
  - Dichomeris miltophragma Meyrick, 1922
  - Dichomeris mistipalpis (Walsingham, 1911)
  - Dichomeris minutia Park, 1994
  - Dichomeris mitteri Park, 1994
  - Dichomeris mochlopis (Meyrick, 1923)
  - Dichomeris molybdea (Janse, 1954)
  - Dichomeris molybdoterma Meyrick, 1933
  - Dichomeris monorbella Viette, 1988
  - Dichomeris moriutii Ponomarenko & Ueda, 2004
  - Dichomeris monococca (Meyrick, 1921)
  - Dichomeris nessica Walsingham, 1911
  - Dichomeris ningshanensis Li & Zheng, 1996
  - Dichomeris nitiellus (Constantini, 1922)
  - Dichomeris nivalis Li & Zheng, 1996
  - Dichomeris obsepta (Meyrick, 1935)
  - Dichomeris oceanis Meyrick, 1920
  - Dichomeris ochreata Park & Hodges, 1995
  - Dichomeris ochreofimbriella (Viette, 1968)
  - Dichomeris ochroxesta (Meyrick, 1921)
  - Dichomeris ochthophora Meyrick, 1936
  - Dichomeris oenombra (Meyrick, 1914)
  - Dichomeris okadai (Moriuti, 1982)
  - Dichomeris oleata Meyrick, 1913
  - Dichomeris olivescens Meyrick, 1913
  - Dichomeris opalina (Ghesquière, 1940)
  - Dichomeris opsonoma Meyrick, 1914
  - Dichomeris opsorrhoa (Meyrick, 1929)
  - Dichomeris orientis Park & Hodges, 1995
  - Dichomeris orthacma Meyrick, 1926
  - Dichomeris ostensella (Walker, 1864)
  - Dichomeris ostracodes Meyrick, 1916
  - Dichomeris oxycarpa (Meyrick, 1935)
  - Dichomeris oxygrapha (Meyrick, 1913)
  - Dichomeris paenitens (Meyrick, 1923)
  - Dichomeris pammiges (Ghesquière, 1940)
  - Dichomeris parallelosa Park & Ponomarenko, 1998
  - Dichomeris parochroma (Janse, 1954)
  - Dichomeris parvisexafurca Li, Zhen & Kendrick, 2010
  - Dichomeris paulianella Viette, 1956
  - Dichomeris paulidigitata Li, Zhen & Mey, 2013
  - Dichomeris pectinella (Forbes, 1931)
  - Dichomeris pelitis (Meyrick, 1913)
  - Dichomeris pelocnista (Meyrick, 1939)
  - Dichomeris percnacma (Meyrick, 1923)
  - Dichomeris percnopolis Walsingham, 1911
  - Dichomeris peristylis (Meyrick, 1904)
  - Dichomeris permundella (Walker, 1864)
  - Dichomeris petalodes Meyrick, 1934
  - Dichomeris phaeosarca (Meyrick, 1931)
  - Dichomeris phaeostrota (Meyrick, 1923)
  - Dichomeris phaeothina (Ghesquière, 1940)
  - Dichomeris phoenogramma (Meyrick, 1930)
  - Dichomeris physeta (Meyrick, 1913)
  - Dichomeris physocoma Meyrick, 1926
  - Dichomeris piperatus (Walsingham, [1892])
  - Dichomeris pladarota Meyrick, 1921
  - Dichomeris plasticus (Meyrick, 1904)
  - Dichomeris planata (Meyrick, 1910)
  - Dichomeris pleuroleuca Turner, 1919
  - Dichomeris pleuropa (Meyrick, 1921)
  - Dichomeris pleurophaea (Turner, 1919)
  - Dichomeris plexigramma Meyrick, 1922
  - Dichomeris plumbosa (Meyrick, 1913)
  - Dichomeris polyaema (Meyrick, 1923)
  - Dichomeris polygnampta (Meyrick, 1938)
  - Dichomeris polygona Li & Zheng, 1996
  - Dichomeris polypunctata Park, 1994
  - Dichomeris porphyrogramma (Meyrick, 1914)
  - Dichomeris praealbescens (Meyrick, 1922)
  - Dichomeris praevacua Meyrick, 1922
  - Dichomeris prensans Meyrick, 1922
  - Dichomeris procrossa (Meyrick, 1913)
  - Dichomeris procyphodes Meyrick, 1922
  - Dichomeris pseudodeltaspis Ponomarenko & Ueda, 2004
  - Dichomeris pseudometra (Meyrick, 1913)
  - Dichomeris pseudomorpha (Janse, 1954)
  - Dichomeris ptilocompa Meyrick, 1922
  - Dichomeris ptychosema Meyrick, 1913
  - Dichomeris punctatella (Walker, 1864)
  - Dichomeris pyretodes (Meyrick, 1914)
  - Dichomeris pyrrhitis (Meyrick, 1911)
  - Dichomeris pyrrhopis (Meyrick, 1922)
  - Dichomeris pyrrhoschista (Meyrick, 1934)
  - Dichomeris qingchengshanensis Li & Zheng, 1996
  - Dichomeris quadrata Park & Ponomarenko, 1998
  - Dichomeris quadratipalpa Li & Zheng, 1996
  - Dichomeris quadrifurca Li & Zheng, 1996
  - Dichomeris quadrifurcata (Janse, 1954)
  - Dichomeris quercicola Meyrick, 1921
  - Dichomeris rasilella (Herrich-Schäffer, 1854)
  - Dichomeris rectifascia Li & Zheng, 1997
  - Dichomeris reducta (Janse, 1951)
  - Dichomeris renascens Walsingham, 1911
  - Dichomeris resignata Meyrick, 1929
  - Dichomeris retracta (Meyrick, 1922)
  - Dichomeris rhizogramma (Meyrick, 1923)
  - Dichomeris rufusella Ponomarenko & Ueda, 2004
  - Dichomeris rhodophaea Meyrick, 1920
  - Dichomeris rubidula (Meyrick, 1913)
  - Dichomeris rubiginosella (Walker, 1864)
  - Dichomeris rurigena (Meyrick, 1914)
  - Dichomeris sandycitis (Meyrick, 1907)
  - Dichomeris santarosensis Hodges, 1985
  - Dichomeris saturata Meyrick, 1923
  - Dichomeris scenites (Meyrick, 1909)
  - Dichomeris scepticopis Meyrick, 1939
  - Dichomeris sciastes Walsingham, 1911
  - Dichomeris sciodora Meyrick, 1922
  - Dichomeris sciritis (Meyrick, 1918)
  - Dichomeris semicuprata (Meyrick, 1922)
  - Dichomeris seminata (Meyrick, 1911)
  - Dichomeris semnias (Meyrick, 1926)
  - Dichomeris serena (Meyrick, 1909)
  - Dichomeris sevectella (Walker, 1864)
  - Dichomeris sexafurca Li & Zheng, 1996
  - Dichomeris shenae Li & Zheng, 1996
  - Dichomeris sicaellus Pathania & Rose, 2003
  - Dichomeris sicasymmetria Walia & Wadhawan, 2004
  - Dichomeris simaoensis Li & Wang, 1997
  - Dichomeris siranta (Meyrick, 1913)
  - Dichomeris skukuzae (Janse, 1954)
  - Dichomeris specularis (Meyrick, 1918)
  - Dichomeris sphyrocopa (Meyrick, 1918)
  - Dichomeris spicans Li & Zheng, 1996
  - Dichomeris spuracuminata Li & Zheng, 1996
  - Dichomeris squalens Meyrick, 1914
  - Dichomeris stasimopa Meyrick, 1937
  - Dichomeris straminis (Walsingham, 1881)
  - Dichomeris stratellus (Walsingham, 1897)
  - Dichomeris stratigera Meyrick, 1922
  - Dichomeris strictella Park, 1994
  - Dichomeris stromatias Meyrick, 1918
  - Dichomeris stygnota (Walsingham, 1911)
  - Dichomeris subdentata Meyrick, 1922
  - Dichomeris subiridescens (Janse, 1954)
  - Dichomeris substratella Walsingham, 1911
  - Dichomeris summata Meyrick, 1913
  - Dichomeris sumptella (Walker, 1864)
  - Dichomeris sutschanellus (Caradja, 1926)
  - Dichomeris symmetrica Park & Hodges, 1995
  - Dichomeris synclepta (Meyrick, 1938)
  - Dichomeris syndyas Meyrick, 1926
  - Dichomeris synergastis Ponomarenko & Park, 1996
  - Dichomeris syngrapta (Meyrick, 1921)
  - Dichomeris syringota (Meyrick, 1926)
  - Dichomeris taiwana Park & Hodges, 1995
  - Dichomeris tapinostola (Janse, 1954)
  - Dichomeris tenextrema Li, Zhen & Mey, 2013
  - Dichomeris tepens (Meyrick, 1923)
  - Dichomeris tephrodes (Meyrick, 1909)
  - Dichomeris tephroxesta (Meyrick, 1931)
  - Dichomeris terracocta (Walsingham, 1911)
  - Dichomeris tersa Li & Zheng, 1996
  - Dichomeris testudinata Meyrick, 1934
  - Dichomeris tetraschema (Meyrick, 1931)
  - Dichomeris thalamopa Meyrick, 1922
  - Dichomeris thalpodes Meyrick, 1922
  - Dichomeris themelia (Meyrick, 1913)
  - Dichomeris thermodryas Meyrick, 1923
  - Dichomeris thermophaea (Meyrick, 1923)
  - Dichomeris thrasynta (Meyrick, 1914)
  - Dichomeris thrypsandra (Meyrick, 1923)
  - Dichomeris thyrsicola (Meyrick, 1913)
  - Dichomeris tongoborella (Viette, 1958)
  - Dichomeris torrefacta (Meyrick, 1914)
  - Dichomeris torrescens (Meyrick, 1921)
  - Dichomeris toxolyca (Meyrick, 1934)
  - Dichomeris traumatias (Meyrick, 1923)
  - Dichomeris tridentata (Janse, 1954)
  - Dichomeris trilobella Park & Hodges, 1995
  - Dichomeris triplagella (Walker, 1864)
  - Dichomeris trisignella (Janse, 1960)
  - Dichomeris trissoxantha (Meyrick, 1922)
  - Dichomeris tristicta Busck, 1914
  - Dichomeris turgida (Meyrick, 1918)
  - Dichomeris turrita (Meyrick, 1914)
  - Dichomeris umbricata Meyrick, 1934
  - Dichomeris uranopis (Meyrick, 1894)
  - Dichomeris ustalella (Fabricius, 1794)
  - Dichomeris vadonella Viette, 1955
  - Dichomeris varifurca Li & Zheng, 1996
  - Dichomeris varronia Busck, 1913
  - Dichomeris ventosa Meyrick, 1913
  - Dichomeris ventriprojecta Li, Zhen & Mey, 2013
  - Dichomeris vernariella Bidzilya, 1998
  - Dichomeris versicolorella (Walker, 1864)
  - Dichomeris vetustella (Walker, 1864)
  - Dichomeris vigilans (Meyrick, 1914)
  - Dichomeris violacula Li & Zheng, 1996
  - Dichomeris viridella (Snellen, 1901)
  - Dichomeris viridescens (Meyrick, 1918)
  - Dichomeris wuyiensis Li & Zheng, 1996
  - Dichomeris xanthodeta Meyrick, 1913
  - Dichomeris xanthophylla (Janse, 1963)
  - Dichomeris xeresella (Viette, 1956)
  - Dichomeris xerodes Walsingham, 1911
  - Dichomeris xestobyrsa Meyrick, 1921
  - Dichomeris xuthochyta (Turner, 1919)
  - Dichomeris xuthostola Walsingham, 1911
  - Dichomeris yanagawanus Matsumura, 1931
  - Dichomeris yuebana Li & Zheng, 1996
  - Dichomeris yunnanensis Li & Zheng, 1996
  - Dichomeris zomias Meyrick, 1914
  - Dichomeris zonaea (Meyrick, 1921)
  - Dichomeris zonata Li & Wang, 1997
  - Dichomeris zygophorus (Meyrick, 1904)
  - Dichomeris zymotella Viette, 1956

== Status unclear ==
- Dichomeris fuliginella (Costa, 1836), described as Rhinosia fuliginella from Italy
