= Dichomeris stygnota =

Scientific classification
- Domain: Eukaryota
- Kingdom: Animalia
- Phylum: Arthropoda
- Class: Insecta
- Order: Lepidoptera
- Family: Gelechiidae
- Genus: Dichomeris
- Species: D. stygnota

Binomial name
- Dichomeris stygnota (Walsingham, 1911)

Synonyms
- Glyphidocera stygnota Walsingham, 1911; Eupolis stygnota; Eupolella stygnota Walsingham, 1911

Species of moth

Dichomeris stygnota is a moth in the family Gelechiidae. It was described by Thomas de Grey, 6th Baron Walsingham, in 1911. It is found in Panama.

The wingspan is about 20 mm (0.79 in). The forewings are pale fawn, much streaked and shaded with brownish fuscous, the middle of the costa very narrowly whitish ochreous. The brownish fuscous streaks follow the lines of the veins, but the space between them on the fold, along the cell, and from the cell to the tornus is much shaded with the same colour, almost obliterating a discal spot at one-third, another at the end of the cell, and a plical spot about half-way between them. The hindwings are brownish grey.
