= Dichomeris opsonoma =

Scientific classification
- Kingdom: Animalia
- Phylum: Arthropoda
- Class: Insecta
- Order: Lepidoptera
- Family: Gelechiidae
- Genus: Dichomeris
- Species: D. opsonoma

Binomial name
- Dichomeris opsonoma Meyrick, 1914

Species of moth

Dichomeris opsonoma is a moth in the family Gelechiidae. It was described by Edward Meyrick in 1914. It is found in Guyana.

The wingspan is about 14 mm (0.55 in). The forewings are pale ochreous yellow, whitish tinged towards the costa anteriorly and with a narrow brownish streak along the dorsum from the base to the tornus, becoming dark brown towards the base. The stigmata are minute, rather dark fuscous, the plical beneath first discal. The posterior part of the costa and termen is somewhat suffused with yellow-ochreous and there is a marginal series of minute black specks around the apex and termen. The hindwings are ochreous whitish.
