= Dichomeris percnacma =

Scientific classification
- Kingdom: Animalia
- Phylum: Arthropoda
- Class: Insecta
- Order: Lepidoptera
- Family: Gelechiidae
- Genus: Dichomeris
- Species: D. percnacma

Binomial name
- Dichomeris percnacma (Meyrick, 1923)

Synonyms
- Vazugada percnacma Meyrick, 1923

Species of moth

Dichomeris percnacma is a moth in the family Gelechiidae. It was described by Edward Meyrick in 1923. It is found in Peru and Amazonas, Brazil.

The wingspan is 15–16 mm (0.59–0.63 in). The forewings are whitish ochreous more or less suffused with brown irroration (sprinkles) and with the costal third pale or ochreous whitish. There is an elongate dark grey mark along the costa beyond the middle and the veins on the costal area are sometimes marked with irregular slender dark fuscous streaks. There are elongate dark brown marks towards the dorsum near the base, in the disc at one-fourth, and towards the costa in the middle. The stigmata are dark fuscous, with the plical somewhat before the first discal. There is a rather elongate dark fuscous spot at the apex and an angulated and waved cloudy dark submarginal line more or less expressed. There are also dark fuscous marginal marks around the apex and termen. The hindwings are rather dark grey.
