= Dichomeris thrasynta =

Scientific classification
- Kingdom: Animalia
- Phylum: Arthropoda
- Class: Insecta
- Order: Lepidoptera
- Family: Gelechiidae
- Genus: Dichomeris
- Species: D. thrasynta

Binomial name
- Dichomeris thrasynta (Meyrick, 1914)

Synonyms
- Ilingiotis thrasynta Meyrick, 1914

Species of moth

Dichomeris thrasynta is a moth in the family Gelechiidae. It was described by Edward Meyrick in 1914. It is found in Guyana.

The wingspan is 8–9 mm (0.31–0.35 in). The forewings are grey, mixed with whitish and dark fuscous and with a blackish dot in the disc at one-fifth. The stigmata are large, black, pale edged, with the plical rather obliquely before the first discal, the second discal often connected with the dorsum by a transverse mark of dark fuscous suffusion. There is also a more or less curved whitish line from two-thirds or three-fourths of the costa to the tornus. The hindwings are grey, in males with the margins of the lower median vein hyaline (glass like) towards the base.
