= Dichomeris strictella =

Scientific classification
- Kingdom: Animalia
- Phylum: Arthropoda
- Clade: Pancrustacea
- Class: Insecta
- Order: Lepidoptera
- Family: Gelechiidae
- Genus: Dichomeris
- Species: D. strictella

Binomial name
- Dichomeris strictella Park, 1994

Species of moth

Dichomeris strictella is a moth in the family Gelechiidae. It was described by Kyu-Tek Park in 1994. It is found in Korea.
