= Dichomeris diacnista =

Scientific classification
- Kingdom: Animalia
- Phylum: Arthropoda
- Class: Insecta
- Order: Lepidoptera
- Family: Gelechiidae
- Genus: Dichomeris
- Species: D. diacnista

Binomial name
- Dichomeris diacnista (Meyrick, 1923)

Synonyms
- Myrophila diacnista Meyrick, 1923

Species of moth

Dichomeris diacnista is a moth in the family Gelechiidae. It was described by Edward Meyrick in 1923. It is found in Guyana.

The wingspan is about 20 mm (0.79 in). The forewings are greyish violet strongly strigulated with rather dark fuscous, the costal edge is suffused ferruginous brown. There is an obscure rather dark fuscous spot in the disc at one-fourth and similar spots representing stigmata, the plical and second discal centred blackish, the plical and first discal transversely placed and confluent. There is also an indistinct darker subterminal shade and dark fuscous marginal dots separated by brownish ochreous around the apex and termen. The hindwings are blackish grey, rather thinly scaled.
