= Dichomeris formulata =

Scientific classification
- Kingdom: Animalia
- Phylum: Arthropoda
- Class: Insecta
- Order: Lepidoptera
- Family: Gelechiidae
- Genus: Dichomeris
- Species: D. formulata

Binomial name
- Dichomeris formulata (Meyrick, 1922)

Synonyms
- Trichotaphe formulata Meyrick, 1922

Species of moth

Dichomeris formulata is a moth in the family Gelechiidae. It was described by Edward Meyrick in 1922. It is found in Amazonas, Brazil.

The wingspan is about 18 mm (0.71 in). The extreme costal edge of the forewings are ochreous whitish from one-fourth to two-thirds and there is a blackish dot on the base of the costa. The stigmata is small and dark fuscous, with adjacent whitish dots posteriorly, the plical beneath the first discal. The hindwings are dark fuscous.
