= List of moths of Zimbabwe =

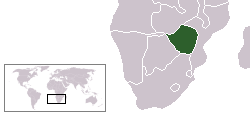
Location of Zimbabwe

The moths of Zimbabwe represent about 1,000 known moth species. The moths (mostly nocturnal) and butterflies (mostly diurnal) together make up the taxonomic order Lepidoptera.

This is a list of moth species which have been recorded in Zimbabwe.

== Adelidae ==
- Ceromitia phaeocoma Meyrick, 1912
- Ceromitia pilularis Meyrick, 1921
- Ceromitia synneura Meyrick, 1921

== Alucitidae ==
- Alucita compsoxantha (Meyrick, 1924)
- Alucita homotrocha (Meyrick, 1921)
- Microschismus lenzi Ustjuzhanin & Kovtunovich, 2011

== Anomoeotidae ==
- Staphylinochrous euryperalis Hampson, 1910
- Thermochrous stenocraspis Hampson, 1910

== Arctiidae ==
- Acantharctia flavicosta (Hampson, 1900)
- Afrasura indecisa (Walker, 1869)
- Afrospilarctia lucida (Druce, 1898)
- Alpenus investigatorum (Karsch, 1898)
- Alpenus maculosa (Stoll, 1781)
- Alpenus nigropunctata (Bethune-Baker, 1908)
- Amata atricornis (Wallengren, 1863)
- Amata croceizona (Hampson, 1910)
- Amata endocrocis (Hampson, 1903)
- Amata marina (Butler, 1876)
- Amata miozona (Hampson, 1910)
- Amerila affinis (Rothschild, 1910)
- Amerila bubo (Walker, 1855)
- Amerila lupia (Druce, 1887)
- Amerila mulleri Häuser & Boppré, 1997
- Amsacta grammiphlebia Hampson, 1901
- Anaphosia astrigata Hampson, 1910
- Anaphosia cyanogramma Hampson, 1903
- Apisa grisescens (Dufrane, 1945)
- Boadicea flavimacula Pinhey, 1968
- Caripodia chrysargyria Hampson, 1900
- Ceryx nacliodes Hampson, 1914
- Cyana pretoriae (Distant, 1897)
- Eilema elegans (Butler, 1877)
- Eilema sanguicosta (Hampson, 1901)
- Eilema similipuncta Hampson, 1914
- Epitoxis nigra Hampson, 1903
- Estigmene tenuistrigata (Hampson, 1900)
- Eyralpenus scioana (Oberthür, 1880)
- Lepista aposema Kühne, 2010
- Macrosia chalybeata Hampson, 1901
- Metarctia collocalia Kiriakoff, 1957
- Metarctia crocina (Kiriakoff, 1973)
- Metarctia flavivena Hampson, 1901
- Metarctia quinta (Kiriakoff, 1973)
- Metarctia tenera (Kiriakoff, 1973)
- Micralarctia punctulatum (Wallengren, 1860)
- Ochrota unicolor (Hopffer, 1857)
- Paralacydes bomfordi (Pinhey, 1968)
- Paralacydes destrictus Kühne, 2010
- Paralacydes ramosa (Hampson, 1907)
- Paralpenus flavicosta (Hampson, 1909)
- Paralpenus julius Kühne, 2010
- Phryganopsis cinerella (Wallengren, 1860)
- Poecilarctia venata Aurivillius, 1921
- Popoudina lemniscata (Distant, 1898)
- Pseudonaclia puella (Boisduval, 1847)
- Radiarctia lutescens (Walker, 1854)
- Radiarctia rhodesiana (Hampson, 1900)
- Siccia eberti Kühne, 2007
- Spilosoma bipartita Rothschild, 1933
- Spilosoma gynephaea (Hampson, 1901)
- Spilosoma lentifasciata (Hampson, 1916)
- Spilosoma sinefascia (Hampson, 1916)
- Spilosoma unipuncta (Hampson, 1905)
- Teracotona euprepia Hampson, 1900
- Teracotona metaxantha Hampson, 1909
- Teracotona rhodophaea (Walker, 1865)
- Trichaeta pterophorina (Mabille, 1892)
- Utetheisa pulchella (Linnaeus, 1758)
- Zobida avifex Kühne, 2010

== Autostichidae ==
- Autosticha emmetra Meyrick, 1921
- Autosticha nothropis Meyrick, 1921

== Cecidosidae ==
- Scyrotis matoposensis Mey, 2007

== Coleophoridae ==
- Blastobasis indigesta Meyrick, 1931
- Blastobasis trachelista Meyrick, 1921
- Coleophora molesta Meyrick, 1921
- Coleophora phaeocentra Meyrick, 1914
- Coleophora purifica Meyrick, 1921

== Cosmopterigidae ==
- Alloclita plumbaria (Meyrick, 1921)
- Ascalenia phaneracma Meyrick, 1921
- Chalcocolona cyananthes (Meyrick, 1911)
- Limnaecia explanata Meyrick, 1921
- Limnaecia sarcanthes Meyrick, 1921
- Macrobathra fasciata (Walsingham, 1891)
- Scaeosopha victoriensis Sinev & Li, 2012

== Cossidae ==
- Phragmataecia irrorata Hampson, 1910

== Crambidae ==
- Agathodes musivalis Guenée, 1854
- Ancylolomia albicostalis Hampson, 1919
- Ancylolomia perfasciata Hampson, 1919
- Calamoschoena stictalis Hampson, 1919
- Chilo argyropasta (Hampson, 1919)
- Cotachena smaragdina (Butler, 1875)
- Crambus brachiiferus Hampson, 1919
- Crambus reducta Janse, 1922
- Diasemia monostigma Hampson, 1913
- Ercta scotialis Hampson, 1912
- Euclasta varii Popescu-Gorj & Constantinescu, 1973
- Ischnurges lancinalis (Guenée, 1854)
- Mesolia uniformella Janse, 1922
- Nomophila noctuella ([Denis & Schiffermüller], 1775)
- Patissa geminalis Hampson, 1919
- Pilocrocis dichocrosialis Hampson, 1912
- Pilocrocis melastictalis Hampson, 1912
- Pilocrocis pterygodia Hampson, 1912
- Prionapteryx flavipars (Hampson, 1919)
- Prionapteryx plumbealis (Hampson, 1919)
- Pyrausta apicalis (Hampson, 1913)
- Pyrausta atricinctalis Hampson, 1913
- Pyrausta gazalis Hampson, 1913
- Pyrausta tetraplagialis Hampson, 1898

== Drepanidae ==
- Aethiopsestis austrina Watson, 1965
- Aethiopsestis echinata Watson, 1965
- Gonoreta opacifinis Watson, 1965

== Elachistidae ==
- Ethmia judicialis Meyrick, 1921
- Haplochrois picropa (Meyrick, 1921)
- Orophia pachystoma (Meyrick, 1921)

== Eriocottidae ==
- Compsoctena delocrossa (Meyrick, 1921)
- Compsoctena furciformis (Meyrick, 1921)
- Compsoctena isopetra (Meyrick, 1921)
- Compsoctena psammosticha (Meyrick, 1921)
- Compsoctena quassa (Meyrick, 1921)
- Compsoctena scriba (Meyrick, 1921)
- Compsoctena spilophanes (Meyrick, 1921)

== Eupterotidae ==
- Hibrildes crawshayi Butler, 1896
- Hibrildes norax Druce, 1887
- Janomima mariana (White, 1843)
- Stenoglene obtusus (Walker, 1864)

== Gelechiidae ==
- Anarsia agricola Walsingham, 1891
- Anarsia balioneura Meyrick, 1921
- Anarsia semnopa Meyrick, 1921
- Aphnogenes zonaea Meyrick, 1921
- Athrips phoenaula (Meyrick, 1913)
- Athrips profusa (Meyrick, 1921)
- Brachmia hemiopa Meyrick, 1921
- Brachmia neurograpta Meyrick, 1921
- Coniogyra dilucescens Meyrick, 1921
- Curvisignella leucogaea (Meyrick, 1921)
- Dichomeris agathopa Meyrick, 1921
- Dichomeris aphanopa Meyrick, 1921
- Dichomeris attenta Meyrick, 1921
- Dichomeris condylodes (Meyrick, 1921)
- Dichomeris erixantha (Meyrick, 1914)
- Dichomeris eustacta Meyrick, 1921
- Dichomeris hylurga Meyrick, 1921
- Dichomeris pladarota Meyrick, 1921
- Dichomeris xestobyrsa Meyrick, 1921
- Dicranucha crateropis (Meyrick, 1921)
- Dicranucha nephelopis (Meyrick, 1921)
- Ephysteris promptella (Staudinger, 1859)
- Epicharta chlorophracta (Meyrick, 1921)
- Eporgastis maturata Meyrick, 1921
- Eporgastis syngrapta (Meyrick, 1921)
- Eporgastis torrescens Meyrick, 1921
- Excommatica compsotoma (Meyrick, 1921)
- Gelechia xylophaea Meyrick, 1921
- Hypatima isosema (Meyrick, 1921)
- Lacistodes tauropis Meyrick, 1921
- Leuronoma oenochyta (Meyrick, 1921)
- Macrocalcara undina (Meyrick, 1921)
- Melitoxestis centrotypa Meyrick, 1921
- Microcraspedus synecta (Meyrick, 1909)
- Neopachnistis autophanta (Meyrick, 1921)
- Neopachnistis finitima (Meyrick, 1921)
- Neopachnistis microphanta (Meyrick, 1921)
- Parallactis ochrobyrsa (Meyrick, 1921)
- Parapsectris konradi Bidzilya, 2010
- Polyhymno chionarcha Meyrick, 1913
- Polyhymno hostilis Meyrick, 1918
- Ptilothyris neuroplaca (Meyrick, 1933)
- Radionerva collecta (Meyrick, 1921)
- Schizovalva sphenopis (Meyrick, 1921)
- Stomopteryx bathrarcha Meyrick, 1921
- Telphusa accensa Meyrick, 1921
- Telphusa objecta Meyrick, 1921
- Telphusa syndelta Meyrick, 1921
- Trichotaphe asteropis (Meyrick, 1921)
- Trichotaphe hercogramma Meyrick, 1921
- Trichotaphe homaloxesta Meyrick, 1921

== Geometridae ==
- Acanthovalva bilineata (Warren, 1895)
- Acanthovalva inconspicuaria (Hübner, 1796)
- Androzeugma mollior Prout, 1922
- Aphilopota phanerostigma Prout, 1917
- Aphilopota plethora Prout, 1938
- Ascotis selenaria ([Denis & Schiffermüller], 1775)
- Biston stringeri (Prout, 1938)
- Cabera aquaemontana (Prout, 1913)
- Cabera strigata (Warren, 1897)
- Chiasmia abnormata (Prout, 1917)
- Chiasmia costicommata (Prout, 1922)
- Chiasmia curvifascia (Warren, 1897)
- Chiasmia extrusilinea (Prout, 1925)
- Chiasmia grisescens (Prout, 1916)
- Chiasmia interrupta (Warren, 1897)
- Chiasmia kilimanjarensis (Holland, 1892)
- Chiasmia marmorata (Warren, 1897)
- Chiasmia multistrigata (Warren, 1897)
- Chiasmia normata (Walker, 1861)
- Chiasmia nubilata (Warren, 1897)
- Chiasmia parallacta (Warren, 1897)
- Chiasmia procidata (Guenée, 1858)
- Chiasmia streniata (Guenée, 1858)
- Chiasmia subcurvaria (Mabille, 1897)
- Cleora betularia (Warren, 1897)
- Cleora munda (Warren, 1899)
- Cleora rostella D. S. Fletcher, 1967
- Coenina poecilaria (Herrich-Schäffer, 1854)
- Colocleora grisea (Janse, 1932)
- Colocleora proximaria (Walker, 1860)
- Comibaena rhodolopha Prout, 1915
- Drepanogynis arcuifera Prout, 1934
- Drepanogynis costipicta (Prout, 1932)
- Drepanogynis crassifurca Krüger, 2002
- Drepanogynis crenilinea Krüger, 2002
- Drepanogynis epione (Prout, 1913)
- Drepanogynis mixtaria Guenée, 1858
- Drepanogynis olivescens (Warren, 1898)
- Drepanogynis tripartita (Warren, 1898)
- Drepanogynis unilineata (Warren, 1897)
- Drepanogynis villaria (Felder & Rogenhofer, 1875)
- Epigynopteryx maeviaria (Guenée, 1858)
- Erastria leucicolor (Butler, 1875)
- Euexia percnopus Prout, 1915
- Eulycia grisea (Warren, 1897)
- Eupithecia rigida Swinhoe, 1892
- Eupithecia semipallida Janse, 1933
- Heterorachis insolens (Prout, 1917)
- Heterostegane bifasciata (Warren, 1914)
- Hypomecis ectropodes (Prout, 1913)
- Idaea heres (Prout, 1932)
- Idiodes flexilinea (Warren, 1898)
- Isoplenodia arabukoensis Sihvonen & Staude, 2010
- Isturgia deerraria (Walker, 1861)
- Isturgia exospilata (Walker, 1861)
- Isturgia spissata (Walker, 1862)
- Lomographa indularia (Guenée, 1858)
- Mauna electa Prout, 1917
- Mauna perquisita Prout, 1922
- Menophra caeca (Prout, 1913)
- Menophra obtusata (Warren, 1902)
- Microligia luteitincta Prout, 1916
- Mimandria cataractae Prout, 1917
- Mimoclystia pudicata (Walker, 1862)
- Neromia clavicornis Prout, 1915
- Omphalucha albosignata Janse, 1932
- Omphalucha maturnaria (Möschler, 1883)
- Oneiliana multifera Prout, 1922
- Orbamia octomaculata (Wallengren, 1872)
- Orbamia subaurata (Warren, 1899)
- Pareclipsis anophthalma Prout, 1916
- Phoenicocampa terinata (Felder & Rogenhofer, 1875)
- Pingasa distensaria (Walker, 1860)
- Pingasa rhadamaria (Guenée, 1858)
- Pitthea trifasciata Dewitz, 1881
- Plateoplia acrobelia (Wallengren, 1875)
- Rhodophthitus commaculata (Warren, 1897)
- Rhodophthitus simplex Warren, 1897
- Scopula curvimargo (Warren, 1900)
- Scopula latitans Prout, 1920
- Scopula ludibunda (Prout, 1915)
- Somatina ioscia Prout, 1932
- Somatina virginalis Prout, 1917
- Trimetopia aetheraria Guenée, 1858
- Xylopteryx oneili Prout, 1922
- Zamarada aclea Prout, 1912
- Zamarada ascaphes Prout, 1925
- Zamarada bathyscaphes Prout, 1912
- Zamarada consecuta Prout, 1922
- Zamarada crystallophana Mabille, 1900
- Zamarada deceptrix Warren, 1914
- Zamarada densisparsa Prout, 1922
- Zamarada denticatella Prout, 1922
- Zamarada differens Bastelberger, 1907
- Zamarada dorsiplaga Prout, 1922
- Zamarada eroessa Prout, 1915
- Zamarada erugata D. S. Fletcher, 1974
- Zamarada fessa Prout, 1912
- Zamarada flavicaput Warren, 1901
- Zamarada gamma D. S. Fletcher, 1958
- Zamarada glareosa Bastelberger, 1909
- Zamarada ignicosta Prout, 1912
- Zamarada ilma Prout, 1922
- Zamarada jansei D. S. Fletcher, 1974
- Zamarada melpomene Oberthür, 1912
- Zamarada metallicata Warren, 1914
- Zamarada metrioscaphes Prout, 1912
- Zamarada odontophora D. S. Fletcher, 1974
- Zamarada ordinaria Bethune-Baker, 1913
- Zamarada plana Bastelberger, 1909
- Zamarada polyctemon Prout, 1932
- Zamarada pringlei D. S. Fletcher, 1974
- Zamarada prionotos D. S. Fletcher, 1974
- Zamarada psammites D. S. Fletcher, 1958
- Zamarada psectra D. S. Fletcher, 1974
- Zamarada pulverosa Warren, 1895
- Zamarada purimargo Prout, 1912
- Zamarada scintillans Bastelberger, 1909
- Zamarada seydeli D. S. Fletcher, 1974
- Zamarada transvisaria (Guenée, 1858)
- Zamarada varii D. S. Fletcher, 1974
- Zamarada vulpina Warren, 1897
- Zeuctoboarmia sabinei (Prout, 1915)

== Glyphipterigidae ==
- Glyphipterix archimedica Meyrick, 1921

== Gracillariidae ==
- Acrocercops chrysophylli Vári, 1961
- Acrocercops terminalina Vári, 1961
- Apistoneura psarochroma Vári, 1961
- Callicercops triceros (Meyrick, 1926)
- Caloptilia cataractias (Meyrick, 1921)
- Caloptilia isotoma (Meyrick, 1914)
- Caloptilia vicinola Vári, 1961
- Conopobathra carbunculata (Meyrick, 1912)
- Conopobathra gravissima (Meyrick, 1912)
- Conopomorpha chionosema Vári, 1961
- Conopomorphina gypsochroma Vári, 1961
- Dialectica carcharota (Meyrick, 1912)
- Diphtheroptila oxyloga (Meyrick, 1928)
- Epicephala jansei Vári, 1961
- Epicephala pyrrhogastra Meyrick, 1908
- Graphiocephala polysticha Vári, 1961
- Metriochroa argyrocelis Vári, 1961
- Pareclectis prionota (Meyrick, 1928)
- Phodoryctis thrypticosema (Vári, 1961)
- Phyllocnistis citrella Stainton, 1856
- Phyllonorycter grewiaecola (Vári, 1961)
- Phyllonorycter hibiscina (Vári, 1961)
- Phyllonorycter melanosparta (Meyrick, 1912)
- Phyllonorycter melhaniae (Vári, 1961)
- Polysoma aenicta Vári, 1961
- Polysoma lithochrysa (Meyrick, 1930)
- Polysoma tanysphena (Meyrick, 1928)
- Porphyrosela teramni Vári, 1961
- Spulerina aphanosema Vári, 1961
- Stomphastis aphrocyma (Meyrick, 1918)
- Stomphastis conflua (Meyrick, 1914)
- Stomphastis polygoni Vári, 1961
- Stomphastis rorkei Vári, 1961
- Stomphastis thraustica (Meyrick, 1908)
- Telamoptilia geyeri (Vári, 1961)

== Hepialidae ==
- Eudalaca ammon (Wallengren, 1860)

== Himantopteridae ==
- Semioptila flavidiscata Hampson, 1910
- Semioptila marshalli Rothschild, 1907
- Semioptila torta Butler, 1887

== Hyblaeidae ==
- Hyblaea occidentalium Holland, 1894
- Hyblaea xanthia Hampson, 1910

== Lasiocampidae ==
- Anadiasa fuscofasciata (Aurivillius, 1922)
- Braura ligniclusa (Walker, 1865)
- Catalebeda jamesoni (Bethune-Baker, 1908)
- Cleopatrina phocea (Druce, 1887)
- Cymatopacha obscura Aurivillius, 1921
- Dollmania purpurascens (Aurivillius, 1909)
- Epicnapteroides fuliginosa Pinhey, 1973
- Epicnapteroides lobata Strand, 1912
- Epicnapteroides marmorata Pinhey, 1973
- Eutricha morosa (Walker, 1865)
- Euwallengrenia rectilineata (Aurivillius, 1905)
- Euwallengrenia reducta (Walker, 1855)
- Gastropacha africana (Holland, 1893)
- Gastroplakaeis meridionalis Aurivillius, 1901
- Gonometa robusta (Aurivillius, 1909)
- Grellada enigmatica (Hering, 1941)
- Grellada marshalli (Aurivillius, 1902)
- Haplopacha cinerea Aurivillius, 1905
- Hypotrabala sanguicincta (Aurivillius, 1901)
- Lechriolepis nephopyropa Tams, 1931
- Metajana marshalli Aurivillius, 1909
- Odontocheilopteryx dollmani Tams, 1930
- Odontocheilopteryx myxa Wallengren, 1860
- Odontocheilopteryx obscura Aurivillius, 1927
- Odontocheilopteryx pattersoni Tams, 1926
- Odontopacha kilwana Strand, 1911
- Pallastica meloui (Riel, 1909)
- Philotherma obscura Aurivillius, 1927
- Pseudolyra cinerea (Aurivillius, 1901)
- Pseudometa dollmani Tams, 1925
- Pseudometa viola Aurivillius, 1901
- Sena donaldsoni (Holland, 1901)
- Stenophatna cymographa (Hampson, 1910)
- Stenophatna marshalli Aurivillius, 1909
- Stenophatna rothschildi (Tams, 1936)
- Stoermeriana fusca (Aurivillius, 1905)
- Theophasida superba (Aurivillius, 1914)
- Trabala charon Druce, 1910
- Trichopisthia igneotincta (Aurivillius, 1909)

== Lecithoceridae ==
- Dragmatucha proaula Meyrick, 1908
- Eridachtha crossogramma (Meyrick, 1921)
- Frisilia compsostoma Meyrick, 1921
- Odites incusata Meyrick, 1921
- Odites metaclista Meyrick, 1915

== Limacodidae ==
- Astatophlebia marmarobrunnea Janse, 1964
- Crothaema conspicua Janse, 1964
- Crothaema sericea Butler, 1880
- Gavara lamborni (Bethune-Baker, 1915)
- Latoia albicosta (Hampson, 1910)
- Latoia viridicosta (Hampson, 1910)
- Macroplectra obliquilinea Hampson, 1910
- Micraphe lateritia Karsch, 1896
- Omocenoides prismallae Janse, 1964
- Paraphlebs singularis Aurivillius, 1921
- Scotinocerides pseudorestricta Hering, 1937
- Stroter dukei Janse, 1964
- Taeda aetitis Wallengren, 1863
- Trachyptena holobrunnea (Janse, 1964)
- Unithosea albilineata (Hampson, 1910)
- Zinara discophora Hampson, 1910

== Lymantriidae ==
- Aroa achrodisca Hampson, 1910
- Aroa quadrimaculata (Janse, 1915)
- Chrysocyma mesopotamia Hampson, 1905
- Crorema fulvinotata (Butler, 1893)
- Dasychira escota Hampson, 1905
- Dasychirana crenulata Bethune-Baker, 1911
- Euproctis crocosticta Hampson, 1905
- Euproctis fulvipennis Hampson, 1910
- Euproctis pallida (Kirby, 1896)
- Heteronygmia dissimilis Aurivillius, 1910
- Laelia aethiopica Bethune-Baker, 1908
- Laelia atrifilata (Hampson, 1905)
- Laelia marginepunctata Bethune-Baker, 1908
- Laelia rubrifilata (Hampson, 1905)
- Leptaroa fulvicolora Hampson, 1910
- Palasea albimacula Wallengren, 1863
- Palasea flavicilia (Hampson, 1910)
- Polymona rufifemur Walker, 1855
- Pteredoa plumosa Hampson, 1905
- Stracena telesilla (Druce, 1899)

== Lyonetiidae ==
- Leucoptera loxaula Meyrick, 1928

== Metarbelidae ==
- Arbelodes prochesi Lehmann, 2010
- Kroonia fumealis (Janse, 1925)
- Kroonia natalica (Hampson, 1910)
- Marshalliana bivittata Aurivillius, 1901
- Metarbela cymaphora Hampson, 1910
- Metarbelodes umtaliana (Aurivillius, 1901)

== Noctuidae ==
- Achaea catella Guenée, 1852
- Achaea echo (Walker, 1858)
- Achaea finita (Guenée, 1852)
- Achaea lienardi (Boisduval, 1833)
- Achaea sordida (Walker, 1865)
- Achaea violascens Hampson, 1918
- Acontia bidentata (Hampson, 1902)
- Acontia chrysoproctis (Hampson, 1902)
- Acontia citripennis (Hampson, 1910)
- Acontia conifrons (Aurivillius, 1879)
- Acontia discoidea Hopffer, 1857
- Acontia dispar (Walker, [1858])
- Acontia ectorrida (Hampson, 1916)
- Acontia gratiosa Wallengren, 1856
- Acontia imitatrix Wallengren, 1856
- Acontia leucotrigona (Hampson, 1905)
- Acontia natalis (Guenée, 1852)
- Acontia nephele Hampson, 1911
- Acontia niphogona (Hampson, 1909)
- Acontia porphyrea (Butler, 1898)
- Acontia simo Wallengren, 1860
- Acontia tanzaniae Hacker, Legrain & Fibiger, 2010
- Acontia transfigurata Wallengren, 1856
- Acontia trimaculata Aurivillius, 1879
- Acontia trychaenoides Wallengren, 1856
- Acontia wahlbergi Wallengren, 1856
- Acrapex brunnea Hampson, 1910
- Acrapex metaphaea Hampson, 1910
- Acrapex spoliata (Walker, 1863)
- Adisura aerugo (Felder & Rogenhofer, 1874)
- Aegocera tricolora Bethune-Baker, 1909
- Agrotis biconica Kollar, 1844
- Agrotis isopleura Hampson, 1902
- Agrotis longidentifera (Hampson, 1903)
- Agrotis segetum ([Denis & Schiffermüller], 1775)
- Aletia consanguis (Guenée, 1852)
- Amazonides ecstrigata (Hampson, 1903)
- Amazonides epipyria (Hampson, 1903)
- Amazonides fumicolor (Hampson, 1902)
- Amazonides ruficeps (Hampson, 1903)
- Amyna axis Guenée, 1852
- Amyna punctum (Fabricius, 1794)
- Anedhella nigrivittata (Hampson, 1902)
- Anoba phaeotermesia Hampson, 1926
- Apospasta fuscirufa (Hampson, 1905)
- Aspidifrontia glaucescens Hampson, 1905
- Aspidifrontia rufescens Hampson, 1902
- Aspidifrontia semipallida Hampson, 1902
- Athetis chionephra (Hampson, 1911)
- Athetis flavipuncta Hampson, 1909
- Athetis leuconephra Hampson, 1909
- Athetis melanosema Hampson, 1914
- Athetis melanosticta Hampson, 1909
- Athetis microtera (Hampson, 1902)
- Athetis poliostrota Hampson, 1909
- Athetis singula (Möschler, 1883)
- Audea humeralis Hampson, 1902
- Audea tegulata Hampson, 1902
- Autoba admota (Felder & Rogenhofer, 1874)
- Autoba versicolor Walker, 1864
- Axylia annularis Saalmüller, 1891
- Brevipecten cornuta Hampson, 1902
- Brithys crini (Fabricius, 1775)
- Busseola fusca (Fuller, 1901)
- Busseola pallidicosta (Hampson, 1902)
- Calamia flavirufa Hampson, 1910
- Calliodes pretiosissima Holland, 1892
- Callopistria maillardi (Guenée, 1862)
- Callyna cupricolor Hampson, 1902
- Callyna nigerrima Hampson, 1902
- Callyna obscura Hampson, 1910
- Caradrina atriluna Guenée, 1852
- Cerocala contraria (Walker, 1865)
- Cerynea thermesialis (Walker, 1866)
- Chalciope delta (Boisduval, 1833)
- Chasmina tibialis (Fabricius, 1775)
- Chlumetia lichenosa (Hampson, 1902)
- Chrysodeixis acuta (Walker, [1858])
- Copifrontia xantherythra Hampson, 1905
- Crameria amabilis (Drury, 1773)
- Cretonia ethiopica Hampson, 1910
- Ctenoplusia fracta (Walker, 1857)
- Ctenoplusia limbirena (Guenée, 1852)
- Cyclopera similis (Hampson, 1902)
- Cyligramma latona (Cramer, 1775)
- Cyligramma magus (Guérin-Méneville, [1844])
- Dicerogastra furvilinea (Hampson, 1902)
- Dysgonia angularis (Boisduval, 1833)
- Dysgonia torrida (Guenée, 1852)
- Ectolopha viridescens Hampson, 1902
- Egybolis vaillantina (Stoll, 1790)
- Entomogramma pardus Guenée, 1852
- Erebus walkeri (Butler, 1875)
- Ethiopica vinosa (Hampson, 1902)
- Eublemma acarodes Swinhoe, 1907
- Eublemma apicata Distant, 1898
- Eublemma flaviceps Hampson, 1902
- Eublemma foedosa (Guenée, 1852)
- Eublemma ornatula (Felder & Rogenhofer, 1874)
- Eublemma penicillata Hampson, 1902
- Eublemma plumbosa Distant, 1899
- Eublemma ragusana (Freyer, 1844)
- Eublemma staudingeri (Wallengren, 1875)
- Eublemma trigramma Hampson, 1910
- Eublemma tritonia (Hampson, 1902)
- Eulocastra aethiops (Distant, 1898)
- Eulymnia pulcherrima (Hampson, 1902)
- Eustrotia decissima (Walker, 1865)
- Eutelia discitriga Walker, 1865
- Eutelia glaucocycla Hampson, 1912
- Eutelia polychorda Hampson, 1902
- Eutelia symphonica Hampson, 1902
- Euterpiodes pienaari (Distant, 1898)
- Euxoa pronycta Hampson, 1903
- Feliniopsis satellitis (Berio, 1974)
- Grammarctia bilinea (Walker, 1865)
- Grammodes congenita Walker, 1858
- Grammodes geometrica (Fabricius, 1775)
- Heliocheilus multiradiata (Hampson, 1902)
- Heliothis flavigera (Hampson, 1907)
- Heraclia aemulatrix (Westwood, 1881)
- Heraclia butleri (Walker, 1869)
- Heraclia limbomaculata (Strand, 1909)
- Heraclia perdix (Druce, 1887)
- Heraclia superba (Butler, 1875)
- Honeyia secunda Hacker & Fibiger, 2007
- Iambia transversa (Moore, 1882)
- Leucania atrinota (Hampson, 1905)
- Leucania cupreata (Hampson, 1905)
- Leucania melianoides Möschler, 1883
- Leucania micropis (Hampson, 1905)
- Leucovis alba (Rothschild, 1897)
- Lithacodia blandula (Guenée, 1862)
- Lophonotidia nocturna Hampson, 1901
- Lophoptera methyalea (Hampson, 1902)
- Marathyssa cuneata (Saalmüller, 1891)
- Masalia galatheae (Wallengren, 1856)
- Masalia sublimis (Berio, 1962)
- Masalia transvaalica (Distant, 1902)
- Matopo inangulata Hampson, 1909
- Mesogenea costimacula Hampson, 1926
- Micragrotis exusta Hampson, 1903
- Micragrotis interstriata (Hampson, 1902)
- Micragrotis microstigma Hampson, 1903
- Micragrotis prosarca Hampson, 1903
- Mimasura tripunctoides Poole, 1989
- Mimasura unipuncta (Hampson, 1902)
- Mitrophrys menete (Cramer, 1775)
- Mocis mayeri (Boisduval, 1833)
- Mocis mutuaria (Walker, 1858)
- Mythimna poliastis (Hampson, 1902)
- Ochrocalama xanthia (Hampson, 1905)
- Ochropleura leucogaster (Freyer, 1831)
- Odontestra vittigera (Hampson, 1902)
- Oederastria ectorhoda Hampson, 1902
- Omphalestra mesomelana (Hampson, 1902)
- Omphaloceps daria (Druce, 1895)
- Ophiusa melaconisia Hampson, 1905
- Ophiusa selenaris (Guenée, 1852)
- Ophiusa tirhaca (Cramer, 1777)
- Oraesia provocans Walker, [1858]
- Oruza latifera (Walker, 1869)
- Ovios capensis (Herrich-Schäffer, 1854)
- Ozarba africana Berio, 1940
- Ozarba bipartita (Hampson, 1902)
- Ozarba bisexualis Hampson, 1910
- Ozarba consanguis (Hampson, 1902)
- Ozarba corniculans (Wallengren, 1860)
- Ozarba hemimelaena Hampson, 1910
- Ozarba hypoxantha (Wallengren, 1860)
- Ozarba jansei Berio, 1940
- Ozarba metachrysea Hampson, 1910
- Ozarba phaea (Hampson, 1902)
- Ozarba subterminalis Hampson, 1910
- Paratuerta marshalli Hampson, 1902
- Pericyma scandulata (Felder & Rogenhofer, 1874)
- Phaegorista xanthosoma Hampson, 1910
- Phalerodes cauta (Hampson, 1902)
- Plecoptera melanoscia Hampson, 1926
- Plecopterodes melliflua (Holland, 1897)
- Plecopterodes moderata (Wallengren, 1860)
- Polia cuprescens Hampson, 1905
- Polydesma sagulata Wallengren, 1875
- Polydesma umbricola Boisduval, 1833
- Procrateria noloides Hampson, 1905
- Pseudospiris paidiformis Butler, 1895
- Pseudozarba opella (Swinhoe, 1885)
- Ramesodes micropis Hampson, 1910
- Rhynchina coniodes Vári, 1962
- Saalmuellerana media (Walker, 1857)
- Schausia langazana Kiriakoff, 1974
- Selenistis annulella (Hampson, 1902)
- Sesamia albivena Hampson, 1902
- Sesamia calamistis Hampson, 1910
- Sesamia coniota Hampson, 1902
- Sesamia taenioleuca (Wallengren, 1866)
- Soloe fumipennis Hampson, 1910
- Spirama glaucescens (Butler, 1893)
- Spirama griseisigna (Hampson, 1913)
- Spodoptera cilium Guenée, 1852
- Spodoptera exempta (Walker, 1857)
- Spodoptera littoralis (Boisduval, 1833)
- Spodoptera mauritia (Boisduval, 1833)
- Tanocryx pinheyi Viette, 1973
- Thiacidas cookei (Pinhey, 1958)
- Thiacidas dukei (Pinhey, 1968)
- Thiacidas fasciata (Fawcett, 1917)
- Thiacidas fractilinea (Pinhey, 1968)
- Thiacidas nigrimacula (Pinhey, 1968)
- Thiacidas postalbida (Gaede, 1939)
- Thiacidas roseotincta (Pinhey, 1962)
- Thyatirina achatina (Weymer, 1896)
- Thysanoplusia indicator (Walker, [1858])
- Timora daphoena Hampson, 1910
- Tracheplexia lucia (Felder & Rogenhofer, 1974)
- Trichoplusia orichalcea (Fabricius, 1775)
- Tumidifrontia castaneotincta Hampson, 1902
- Tytroca balnearia (Distant, 1898)
- Ulotrichopus leucopasta Hampson, 1913
- Ulotrichopus tinctipennis (Hampson, 1902)
- Uncula tristigmatias (Hampson, 1902)
- Vietteania torrentium (Guenée, 1852)
- Vittaplusia vittata (Wallengren, 1856)
- Zalaca snelleni (Wallengren, 1875)

== Nolidae ==
- Arcyophora longivalvis Guenée, 1852
- Arcyophora patricula (Hampson, 1902)
- Chlorozada verna (Hampson, 1902)
- Earias insulana (Boisduval, 1833)
- Maurilia arcuata (Walker, [1858])
- Meganola infuscata (Hampson, 1903)
- Megathripa rufimedia (Hampson, 1905)
- Neaxestis griseata Hampson, 1902
- Neaxestis rhoda Hampson, 1905
- Negeta luminosa (Walker, 1858)
- Negeta nivea (Hampson, 1902)
- Nola argyrolepis Hampson, 1907
- Nola foviferoides Poole, 1989
- Nola imitata (van Son, 1933)
- Nola major Hampson, 1891
- Nola melanoscelis (Hampson, 1914)
- Nola phaeocraspis (Hampson, 1909)
- Nola socotrensis (Hampson, 1901)
- Paranola bipartita van Son, 1933
- Pardoxia graellsii (Feisthamel, 1837)
- Xanthodes brunnescens (Pinhey, 1968)

== Notodontidae ==
- Afrocerura leonensis (Hampson, 1910)
- Afroplitis phyllocampa (Trimen, 1909)
- Antheua aurifodinae (Distant, 1902)
- Antheua croceipuncta Hampson, 1910
- Antheua delicata Bethune-Baker, 1911
- Antheua encausta (Hampson, 1910)
- Antheua trimacula Kiriakoff, 1954
- Archistilbia cineracea Kiriakoff, 1954
- Archistilbia varii Kiriakoff, 1970
- Atrasana callitoxa (Tams, 1930)
- Atrasana grisea (Gaede, 1928)
- Atrasana pinheyi Kiriakoff, 1962
- Bisolita rubrifascia (Hampson, 1910)
- Catastygne tristicolor (Gaede, 1928)
- Cerurina marshalli (Hampson, 1910)
- Chlorocalliope calliope (Hampson, 1910)
- Chlorochadisra beltista (Tams, 1930)
- Clostera distinguenda Kiriakoff, 1962
- Clostera ferruginosa (Gaede, 1934)
- Clostera formosa Kiriakoff, 1962
- Clostera nubila Kiriakoff, 1962
- Clostera semilunata Kiriakoff, 1971
- Deinarchia agramma (Hampson, 1910)
- Desmeocraera analis Kiriakoff, 1954
- Desmeocraera basalis Distant, 1899
- Desmeocraera canescens Janse, 1920
- Desmeocraera decorata (Wichgraf, 1922)
- Desmeocraera interpellatrix (Wallengren, 1860)
- Desmeocraera latex (Druce, 1901)
- Desmeocraera luteosticta Kiriakoff, 1968
- Desmeocraera oliva Kiriakoff, 1968
- Desmeocraera venusta Kiriakoff, 1954
- Desmeocraera vernalis Distant, 1897
- Drapetides uniformis (Swinhoe, 1907)
- Elaphrodes lactea (Gaede, 1932)
- Epicerura steniptera (Hampson, 1910)
- Eubreyeria dasychiroides (Janse, 1920)
- Eujansea afra (Bethune-Baker, 1911)
- Galona serena Karsch, 1895
- Hampsonita esmeralda (Hampson, 1910)
- Helga infans Kiriakoff, 1962
- Heraia thalassina (Hampson, 1910)
- Induba nigrescens Kiriakoff, 1955
- Leptolepida rhodesiae Kiriakoff, 1965
- Leucophalera latipennis (Butler, 1897)
- Metopteryx cinerea (Janse, 1920)
- Metopteryx infans (Kiriakoff, 1964)
- Notocerura spiritalis (Distant, 1899)
- Notoxantha sesamiodes Hampson, 1910
- Paradrallia rhodesi Bethune-Baker, 1908
- Pararethona hierax (Distant, 1897)
- Parastaura divisa Gaede, 1928
- Phalera imitata Druce, 1896
- Phycitimorpha congruata Janse, 1920
- Phycitimorpha stigmatica Janse, 1920
- Plastystaura glis Kiriakoff, 1968
- Plastystaura murina Kiriakoff, 1965
- Polelassothys plumitarsus Janse, 1920
- Polienus capillata (Wallengren, 1875)
- Polienus fuscatus Janse, 1920
- Polienus nigrosparsa Janse, 1920
- Psalisodes dimorpha Kiriakoff, 1968
- Pseudorethona albicans (Walker, 1855)
- Quista albicostata (Hampson, 1910)
- Rasemia macrodonta (Hampson, 1909)
- Rheneina buceros Kiriakoff, 1971
- Rosinella rosinaria (Hampson, 1910)
- Sarimarais bicolor (Distant, 1899)
- Sarimarais pinheyi Kiriakoff, 1962
- Scrancia danieli Kiriakoff, 1962
- Scrancia elanus Kiriakoff, 1971
- Scrancia galactoperoides Kiriakoff, 1970
- Scrancia milvus Kiriakoff, 1971
- Scrancia stictica Hampson, 1910
- Scrancia subscrancia Kiriakoff, 1970
- Stenostaura rhodesiae (Kiriakoff, 1965)
- Tricholoba glaphira (Kiriakoff, 1955)
- Trotonotus bettoni Butler, 1898
- Turnacoides basipuncta Gaede, 1928

== Oecophoridae ==
- Erotis hesperanthes Meyrick, 1921
- Fabiola callipetala Meyrick, 1921
- Ocyphron oxyphylla Meyrick, 1921
- Plesiosticha galactaea (Meyrick, 1908)
- Promalactis geometrica Meyrick, 1913
- Stathmopoda revincta Meyrick, 1921

== Opostegidae ==
- Opostega orophoxantha Meyrick, 1921

== Plutellidae ==
- Plutella xylostella (Linnaeus, 1758)

== Psychidae ==
- Ctenocompa halophanta Meyrick, 1921
- Narycia copiosa Meyrick, 1921
- Narycia prothyrodes Meyrick, 1921
- Picrospora invia (Meyrick, 1921)
- Picrospora monoplecta (Meyrick, 1921)

== Pterophoridae ==
- Hepalastis pumilio (Zeller, 1873)
- Macrotinactis stenodactylus (D. S. Fletcher, 1911)
- Marasmarcha sisyrodes Meyrick, 1921
- Platyptilia locharcha Meyrick, 1924
- Pterophorus albidus (Zeller, 1852)
- Stenodacma wahlbergi (Zeller, 1852)

== Pyralidae ==
- Aglossodes prionophoralis Ragonot, 1891
- Aphomia pimelodes Meyrick, 1936
- Calamotropodes grisella Janse, 1922
- Commotria albistria Janse, 1922
- Commotria ruficolor Janse, 1922
- Delopterus basalis Janse, 1922
- Epilepia melanobasis (Hampson, 1906)
- Epilepia melanobrunnea (Janse, 1922)
- Epilepia melanosparsalis (Janse, 1922)
- Epilepia melapastalis (Hampson, 1906)
- Hypsopygia mauritialis (Boisduval, 1833)
- Lamoria exiguata Whalley, 1964
- Lamoria imbella (Walker, 1864)
- Lamoria medianalis Hampson, 1917
- Macalla cupreotincta Janse, 1922
- Mesodiphlebia rhodesiana Janse, 1922
- Parematheudes simplex (Janse, 1922)
- Pempelia morosalis (Saalmüller, 1880)
- Poliostola phycitimorpha Janse, 1922
- Pyralis galactalis Hampson, 1916
- Rhinaphe lutosa Janse, 1922

== Saturniidae ==
- Adafroptilum incana (Sonthonnax, 1899)
- Antistathmoptera daltonae Tams, 1935
- Antistathmoptera rectangulata Pinhey, 1968
- Argema mimosae (Boisduval, 1847)
- Athletes gigas (Sonthonnax, 1902)
- Athletes semialba (Sonthonnax, 1904)
- Aurivillius arata (Westwood, 1849)
- Bunaeopsis bomfordi Pinhey, 1962
- Bunaeopsis hersilia (Westwood, 1849)
- Bunaeopsis jacksoni (Jordan, 1908)
- Bunaeopsis oubie (Guérin-Méneville, 1849)
- Bunaeopsis princeps (Le Cerf, 1918)
- Bunaeopsis vau (Fawcett, 1915)
- Campimoptilum kuntzei (Dewitz, 1881)
- Cinabra hyperbius (Westwood, 1881)
- Cinabra kitalei Bouvier, 1930
- Cirina forda (Westwood, 1849)
- Decachorda aspersa (Felder, 1874)
- Decachorda fulvia (Druce, 1886)
- Decachorda pomona (Weymer, 1892)
- Decachorda rosea Aurivillius, 1898
- Epiphora bauhiniae (Guérin-Méneville, 1832)
- Epiphora mythimnia (Westwood, 1849)
- Gonimbrasia affinis (Bouvier, 1926)
- Gonimbrasia tyrrhea (Cramer, 1775)
- Gonimbrasia zambesina (Walker, 1865)
- Gynanisa ata Strand, 1911
- Gynanisa maja (Klug, 1836)
- Gynanisa zimba Darge, 2008
- Heniocha apollonia (Cramer, 1779)
- Heniocha marnois (Rogenhofer, 1891)
- Holocerina agomensis (Karsch, 1896)
- Holocerina angulata (Aurivillius, 1893)
- Holocerina rhodesiensis (Janse, 1918)
- Holocerina smilax (Westwood, 1849)
- Imbrasia ertli Rebel, 1904
- Lobobunaea angasana (Westwood, 1849)
- Lobobunaea phaedusa (Drury, 1782)
- Ludia delegorguei (Boisduval, 1847)
- Ludia orinoptena Karsch, 1892
- Micragone ansorgei (Rothschild, 1907)
- Nudaurelia carnegiei Janse, 1918
- Nudaurelia gueinzii (Staudinger, 1872)
- Nudaurelia macrops Rebel, 1917
- Nudaurelia macrothyris (Rothschild, 1906)
- Orthogonioptilum adiegetum Karsch, 1892
- Pseudaphelia apollinaris (Boisduval, 1847)
- Pseudimbrasia deyrollei (J. Thomson, 1858)
- Pseudobunaea irius (Fabricius, 1793)
- Pseudobunaea tyrrhena (Westwood, 1849)
- Rohaniella pygmaea (Maassen & Weymer, 1885)
- Tagoropsis hanningtoni (Butler, 1883)
- Urota conjuncta Bouvier, 1930
- Usta terpsichore (Maassen & Weymer, 1885)

== Sesiidae ==
- Chamanthedon xanthopasta Hampson, 1919
- Echidgnathia vitrifasciata (Hampson, 1910)
- Episannina melanochalcia Le Cerf, 1917
- Erismatica erythropis Meyrick, 1933
- Homogyna sanguicosta Hampson, 1919
- Melittia lentistriata Hampson, 1919
- Melittia oedipus Oberthür, 1878
- Paranthrene xanthosoma (Hampson, 1910)
- Tipulamima sophax (Druce, 1899)
- Vespaegeria typica Strand, 1913

== Sphingidae ==
- Afroclanis calcareus (Rothschild & Jordan, 1907)
- Afroclanis neavi (Hampson, 1910)
- Antinephele lunulata Rothschild & Jordan, 1903
- Antinephele maculifera Holland, 1889
- Basiothia aureata (Karsch, 1891)
- Basiothia schenki (Möschler, 1872)
- Falcatula falcata (Rothschild & Jordan, 1903)
- Hippotion roseipennis (Butler, 1882)
- Hippotion stigma (Rothschild & Jordan, 1903)
- Leptoclanis pulchra Rothschild & Jordan, 1903
- Likoma apicalis Rothschild & Jordan, 1903
- Litosphingia corticea Jordan, 1920
- Neoclanis basalis (Walker, 1866)
- Neopolyptychus compar (Rothschild & Jordan, 1903)
- Nephele lannini Jordan, 1926
- Nephele rosae Butler, 1875
- Odontosida magnificum (Rothschild, 1894)
- Pantophaea oneili (Clark, 1925)
- Phylloxiphia metria (Jordan, 1920)
- Phylloxiphia punctum (Rothschild, 1907)
- Phylloxiphia vicina (Rothschild & Jordan, 1915)
- Platysphinx piabilis (Distant, 1897)
- Polyptychoides grayii (Walker, 1856)
- Polyptychopsis marshalli (Rothschild & Jordan, 1903)
- Polyptychus baxteri Rothschild & Jordan, 1908
- Polyptychus coryndoni Rothschild & Jordan, 1903
- Praedora marshalli Rothschild & Jordan, 1903
- Praedora plagiata Rothschild & Jordan, 1903
- Pseudoclanis molitor (Rothschild & Jordan, 1912)
- Rhodafra marshalli Rothschild & Jordan, 1903
- Rufoclanis fulgurans (Rothschild & Jordan, 1903)
- Rufoclanis jansei (Vári, 1964)
- Rufoclanis numosae (Wallengren, 1860)
- Temnora elegans (Rothschild, 1895)
- Temnora funebris (Holland, 1893)
- Temnora iapygoides (Holland, 1889)
- Temnora natalis Walker, 1856
- Temnora pseudopylas (Rothschild, 1894)
- Temnora pylades Rothschild & Jordan, 1903
- Temnora pylas (Cramer, 1779)
- Temnora sardanus (Walker, 1856)
- Temnora subapicalis Rothschild & Jordan, 1903
- Temnora swynnertoni Stevenson, 1938
- Temnora zantus (Herrich-Schäffer, 1854)
- Theretra cajus (Cramer, 1777)
- Xenosphingia jansei Jordan, 1920

== Thyrididae ==
- Arniocera cyanoxantha (Mabille, 1893)
- Arniocera erythropyga (Wallengren, 1860)
- Arniocera zambesina (Walker, 1866)
- Bupota tranquilla Whalley, 1971
- Dilophura caudata (Jordan, 1907)
- Dysodia constellata Warren, 1908
- Dysodia fenestratella Warren, 1900
- Dysodia fumida Whalley, 1968
- Dysodia incognita Whalley, 1968
- Dysodia intermedia (Walker, 1865)
- Dysodia subsignata Warren, 1908
- Dysodia vitrina (Boisduval, 1829)
- Epaena danista Whalley, 1971
- Lamprochrysa scintillans (Butler, 1893)
- Lamprochrysa triplex (Plötz, 1880)
- Rhodoneura flavicilia Hampson, 1906
- Rhodoneura lacunosa Whalley, 1971

== Tineidae ==
- Acridotarsa melipecta (Meyrick, 1915)
- Amphixystis anachoreta (Meyrick, 1921)
- Amphixystis cymataula (Meyrick, 1926)
- Antigambra amphitrocta Meyrick, 1927
- Ateliotum reluctans (Meyrick, 1921)
- Ceratophaga ethadopa (Meyrick, 1938)
- Ceratophaga lichmodes (Meyrick, 1921)
- Ceratophaga vastellus (Zeller, 1852)
- Cimitra fetialis (Meyrick, 1917)
- Cimitra horridella (Walker, 1863)
- Crypsithyris cerodectis Meyrick, 1921
- Crypsithyris hemiphracta Meyrick, 1926
- Cylicobathra argocoma (Meyrick, 1914)
- Cylicobathra chionarga Meyrick, 1920
- Dasyses obliterata Gozmány, 1968
- Drosica abjectella Walker, 1963
- Edosa audens (Meyrick, 1921)
- Edosa leucastis (Meyrick, 1908)
- Edosa rhodesica (Gozmány, 1967)
- Hapsifera glebata Meyrick, 1908
- Hapsifera marmarota Meyrick, 1914
- Hapsifera ochroptila Meyrick, 1908
- Hapsifera septica Meyrick, 1908
- Hapsiferona glareosa (Meyrick, 1912)
- Hyperbola mellichroa (Gozmány, 1968)
- Hyperbola phocina (Meyrick, 1908)
- Miarotagmata penetrata (Meyrick, 1911)
- Monopis megalodelta Meyrick, 1908
- Monopis persimilis Gozmány, 1965
- Perissomastix christinae Gozmány, 1965
- Perissomastix dentifera Gozmány & Vári, 1973
- Perissomastix fulvicoma (Meyrick, 1921)
- Perissomastix mili Gozmány, 1965
- Perissomastix mucrapex Gozmány, 1968
- Perissomastix perlata Gozmány, 1967
- Perissomastix recurvata Gozmány, 1968
- Phaeoses lithacma (Meyrick, 1921)
- Pitharcha chalinaea Meyrick, 1908
- Silosca savannae Gozmány, 1968
- Sphallestasis exarata (Gozmány, 1968)
- Sphallestasis oenopis (Meyrick, 1908)
- Sphallestasis spatulata (Gozmány, 1967)
- Sphallestasis tanystis (Meyrick, 1908)
- Tinea subalbidella Stainton, 1867
- Tinea translucens Meyrick, 1917
- Tineola bisselliella (Hummel, 1823)

== Tischeriidae ==
- Coptotriche basipectinella Puplesis & Diskus, 2003
- Coptotriche zimbabwiensis Puplesis & Diskus, 2003
- Tischeria sparmanniae Puplesis & Diškus, 2003

== Tortricidae ==
- Bactra aciculata Diakonoff, 1963
- Bactra legitima Meyrick, 1911
- Bactra punctistrigana Mabille, 1900
- Bactra pythonia Meyrick, 1909
- Bactra stagnicolana Zeller, 1852
- Brachioxena psammacta (Meyrick, 1908)
- Cornesia ormoperla Razowski, 1981
- Cydia campestris (Meyrick, 1914)
- Cydia cyanocephala (Meyrick, 1921)
- Cydia leucatma (Meyrick, 1925)
- Cydia malesana (Meyrick, 1920)
- Cydia nicomacha (Meyrick, 1921)
- Cydia stelocosma (Meyrick, 1925)
- Dasodis rimosa (Meyrick, 1921)
- Doliochastis homograpta Meyrick, 1920
- Eccopsis incultana (Walker, 1863)
- Epichoristodes acerbella (Walker, 1864)
- Eucosma florescens Meyrick, 1925
- Eucosma gomphacma Meyrick, 1928
- Eucosma habrotoma Meyrick, 1934
- Eucosmocydia antidora (Meyrick, 1921)
- Homona polyarcha Meyrick, 1924
- Leguminovora ptychora (Meyrick, 1907)
- Megalota lobotona (Meyrick, 1921)
- Mesotes chromataspis (Meyrick, 1921)
- Metendothenia balanacma (Meyrick, 1914)
- Olethreutes mochlaspis (Meyrick, 1921)
- Olethreutes transformis (Meyrick, 1921)
- Olethreutes trithyra (Meyrick, 1921)
- Paraeccopsis acroplecta (Meyrick, 1921)
- Paraeccopsis exhilarata (Meyrick, 1918)
- Rufeccopsis brunneograpta Razowski, 2008
- Rufeccopsis rufescens (Meyrick, 1913)
- Stenentoma plectocosma (Meyrick, 1921)
- Thaumatotibia batrachopa (Meyrick, 1908)
- Tortrix praeclinata Meyrick, 1921

== Uraniidae ==
- Leucoplema dohertyi (Warren, 1904)

== Xyloryctidae ==
- Scythris distactica Meyrick, 1921
- Scythris halmyrodes Meyrick, 1921
- Scythris homoxantha Meyrick, 1921
- Scythris ilyopa Meyrick, 1921
- Scythris patiens Meyrick, 1921

== Yponomeutidae ==
- Prays citri (Millière, 1873)
- Yponomeuta octocentra Meyrick, 1921

== Zygaenidae ==
- Astyloneura glennia (Jordan, 1907)
- Epiorna ochreipennis (Butler, 1874)
- Malamblia flavipalpis Hampson, 1910
