= Frisilia moriutii =

Scientific classification
- Kingdom: Animalia
- Phylum: Arthropoda
- Clade: Pancrustacea
- Class: Insecta
- Order: Lepidoptera
- Family: Lecithoceridae
- Genus: Frisilia
- Species: F. moriutii

Binomial name
- Frisilia moriutii Park, 2005

Species of moth

Frisilia moriutii is a moth in the family Lecithoceridae. It was described by Kyu-Tek Park in 2005. It is found in Thailand.

The wingspan is 17–18 mm. The forewing pattern is similar to that of Frisilia forficatella, but moriutii is larger.
