= Frisilia cornualis =

Scientific classification
- Domain: Eukaryota
- Kingdom: Animalia
- Phylum: Arthropoda
- Class: Insecta
- Order: Lepidoptera
- Family: Lecithoceridae
- Genus: Frisilia
- Species: F. cornualis

Binomial name
- Frisilia cornualis Park, 2008

Species of moth

Frisilia cornualis is a moth in the family Lecithoceridae. It is found in Taiwan and Vietnam.

The wingspan is 11–12 mm.

== Etymology ==
The species name refers to the horn shaped cornuti in the aedeagus and is derived from Latin cornu (meaning horn).
