= Frisilia verticosa =

Scientific classification
- Domain: Eukaryota
- Kingdom: Animalia
- Phylum: Arthropoda
- Class: Insecta
- Order: Lepidoptera
- Family: Lecithoceridae
- Genus: Frisilia
- Species: F. verticosa

Binomial name
- Frisilia verticosa Meyrick, 1914

Species of moth

Frisilia verticosa is a moth in the family Lecithoceridae. It was described by Edward Meyrick in 1914. It is found in southern India.

The wingspan is 23–24 mm. The forewings are yellow ochreous, sometimes partially tinged with brownish, more or less sprinkled with dark fuscous, and with the base of the wing in males more or less suffused with dark fuscous. The first discal stigma is blackish. In males, there is a patch of dark-fuscous suffusion along the median third of the dorsum, anteriorly with an oblique extension across the fold towards the base of the costa, posteriorly emitting a suffused dark-fuscous streak across the wing towards the costa at four-fifths, more or less obsolescent towards the costa, the second discal stigma sometimes apparent as a darker mark on the anterior edge of this. These markings are hardly traceable in females, but the second discal stigma is distinct. There is a more or less developed streak of fuscous suffusion along the termen, which is faint in females. The hindwings are whitish ochreous, faintly fuscous, tinged towards the apex and on the termen. There is a grey discal dot on the end of the cell.
