= Parallactis =

Scientific classification
- Domain: Eukaryota
- Kingdom: Animalia
- Phylum: Arthropoda
- Class: Insecta
- Order: Lepidoptera
- Family: Autostichidae
- Subfamily: Autostichinae
- Genus: Parallactis; Meyrick, 1925

Genus of moths

Parallactis is a genus of moth in the family Autostichidae.

== Species ==
- Parallactis mitigata (Meyrick, 1914)
- Parallactis ochrobyrsa (Meyrick, 1921)
- Parallactis panchlora (Meyrick, 1911)
- Parallactis periochra (Meyrick, 1916)
- Parallactis plaesiodes (Meyrick, 1920)
- Parallactis zorophanes Janse, 1954
