= Apostibes =

Scientific classification
- Kingdom: Animalia
- Phylum: Arthropoda
- Class: Insecta
- Order: Lepidoptera
- Family: Scythrididae
- Genus: Apostibes; Walsingham, 1907

Synonyms
- Coleophorides Amsel, 1935

Genus of moths

Apostibes is a genus of moths in the family Scythrididae.

== Species ==
- Apostibes aerata Walsingham, 1914
- Apostibes afghana Passerin d'Entrèves & Roggero, 2003
- Apostibes deckerti Bengtsson, 2014
- Apostibes dhahrani Passerin d'Entrèves & Roggero, 2003
- Apostibes griseolineata Walsingham, 1907
- Apostibes halmyrodes (Meyrick, 1921)
- Apostibes inota (Meyrick, 1924)
- Apostibes mesopora Walsingham, 1914
- Apostibes nivisignata Walsingham, 1914
- Apostibes raguae Bengtsson, 1997
- Apostibes samburensis Bengtsson, 2014
