= Polysoma =

Scientific classification
- Kingdom: Animalia
- Phylum: Arthropoda
- Class: Insecta
- Order: Lepidoptera
- Family: Gracillariidae
- Subfamily: Gracillariinae
- Genus: Polysoma; Vári, 1961

Species
- See text

Genus of moths

Polysoma is a genus of moths in the family Gracillariidae.

== Species ==
- Polysoma aenicta Vári, 1961
- Polysoma clarki Vári, 1961
- Polysoma eumetalla (Meyrick, 1880)
- Polysoma lithochrysa (Meyrick, 1930)
- Polysoma tanysphena (Meyrick, 1928)
