= Frisilia senilis =

Scientific classification
- Kingdom: Animalia
- Phylum: Arthropoda
- Class: Insecta
- Order: Lepidoptera
- Family: Lecithoceridae
- Genus: Frisilia
- Species: F. senilis

Binomial name
- Frisilia senilis Meyrick, 1910

Species of moth

Frisilia senilis is a moth in the family Lecithoceridae. It was described by Edward Meyrick in 1910. It is found in southern India.

The wingspan is 12–13 mm. The forewings are whitish ochreous or pale ochreous, with some scattered dark fuscous specks, the dorsal area in males sometimes suffused with deep yellow ochreous. The discal stigmata are black and dot like, the second in males forming a somewhat oblique short transverse mark. The hindwings are light grey.
