= Apostibes deckerti =

Scientific classification
- Kingdom: Animalia
- Phylum: Arthropoda
- Clade: Pancrustacea
- Class: Insecta
- Order: Lepidoptera
- Family: Scythrididae
- Genus: Apostibes
- Species: A. deckerti

Binomial name
- Apostibes deckerti Bengtsson, 2014

Species of moth

Apostibes deckerti is a moth of the family Scythrididae. It was described by Bengt Å. Bengtsson in 2014. It is found in Kenya, Namibia and Yemen.
