= Apostibes griseolineata =

Scientific classification
- Domain: Eukaryota
- Kingdom: Animalia
- Phylum: Arthropoda
- Class: Insecta
- Order: Lepidoptera
- Family: Scythrididae
- Genus: Apostibes
- Species: A. griseolineata

Binomial name
- Apostibes griseolineata Walsingham, 1907

Synonyms
- Scythris striella Turati, 1929; Coleophorides bahrlutella Amsel, 1935

Species of moth

Apostibes griseolineata is a moth of the family Scythrididae. It was described by Lord Walsingham in 1907. It is found in Israel, Kazakhstan, Uzbekistan, Saudi Arabia, Palestine, Libya, Algeria and Tunisia.
