= Microschismus antennatus =

Scientific classification
- Domain: Eukaryota
- Kingdom: Animalia
- Phylum: Arthropoda
- Class: Insecta
- Order: Lepidoptera
- Family: Alucitidae
- Genus: Microschismus
- Species: M. antennatus

Binomial name
- Microschismus antennatus T. B. Fletcher, 1909

Synonyms
- Microschismus ctenias Meyrick, 1911; Microschismus columella Meyrick, 1927; Microschismus cato Meyrick, 1927

Species of moth

Microschismus antennatus is a species of moth of the family Alucitidae. It was described by Thomas Bainbrigge Fletcher in 1909 and is known from South Africa.
