= Apostibes dhahrani =

Scientific classification
- Domain: Eukaryota
- Kingdom: Animalia
- Phylum: Arthropoda
- Class: Insecta
- Order: Lepidoptera
- Family: Scythrididae
- Genus: Apostibes
- Species: A. dhahrani

Binomial name
- Apostibes dhahrani Passerin d'Entrèves & Roggero, 2003

Species of moth

Apostibes dhahrani is a moth of the family Scythrididae. It was described by Pietro Passerin d'Entrèves and Angela Roggero in 2003. It is found in eastern Saudi Arabia.

== Etymology ==
The species name is derived from Dhahran, the type locality.
