= Eridachtha longicornella =

Scientific classification
- Domain: Eukaryota
- Kingdom: Animalia
- Phylum: Arthropoda
- Class: Insecta
- Order: Lepidoptera
- Family: Lecithoceridae
- Genus: Eridachtha
- Species: E. longicornella

Binomial name
- Eridachtha longicornella (Chrétien, 1915)

Synonyms
- Symmoca longicornella Chrétien, 1915

Species of moth

Eridachtha longicornella is a moth in the family Lecithoceridae which is found in Algeria. It was described by Pierre Chrétien in 1915.

The wingspan is about 12 mm. The forewings are yellowish and the hindwings are greyish white.
