= Marshalliana jansei =

Scientific classification
- Kingdom: Animalia
- Phylum: Arthropoda
- Class: Insecta
- Order: Lepidoptera
- Family: Cossidae
- Genus: Marshalliana
- Species: M. jansei

Binomial name
- Marshalliana jansei Gaede, 1929

Species of moth

Marshalliana jansei is a moth in the family Cossidae. It is found in South Africa and Tanzania.
