= Parallactis panchlora =

Scientific classification
- Domain: Eukaryota
- Kingdom: Animalia
- Phylum: Arthropoda
- Class: Insecta
- Order: Lepidoptera
- Family: Autostichidae
- Genus: Parallactis
- Species: P. panchlora

Binomial name
- Parallactis panchlora (Meyrick, 1911)

Synonyms
- Brachmia panchlora Meyrick, 1911

Species of moth

Parallactis panchlora is a moth in the family Autostichidae. It was described by Edward Meyrick in 1911. It is found in South Africa.

The wingspan is about 15 mm. The forewings are pale yellow ochreous, the costa somewhat yellower. The hindwings are whitish ochreous.
