= Aethiopsestis mufindiae =

Scientific classification
- Kingdom: Animalia
- Phylum: Arthropoda
- Class: Insecta
- Order: Lepidoptera
- Family: Drepanidae
- Genus: Aethiopsestis
- Species: A. mufindiae

Binomial name
- Aethiopsestis mufindiae Watson, 1965

Species of false owlet moth

Aethiopsestis mufindiae is a moth in the family Drepanidae. It was described by Watson in 1965. It is found in Tanzania.
