= Eridachtha calamopis =

Scientific classification
- Kingdom: Animalia
- Phylum: Arthropoda
- Class: Insecta
- Order: Lepidoptera
- Family: Lecithoceridae
- Genus: Eridachtha
- Species: E. calamopis

Binomial name
- Eridachtha calamopis Meyrick, 1920

Species of moth

Eridachtha calamopis is a moth in the family Lecithoceridae. It was described by Edward Meyrick in 1920. It is found in Kenya.
