= Parallactis periochra =

Scientific classification
- Kingdom: Animalia
- Phylum: Arthropoda
- Class: Insecta
- Order: Lepidoptera
- Family: Autostichidae
- Genus: Parallactis
- Species: P. periochra

Binomial name
- Parallactis periochra (Meyrick, 1916)

Synonyms
- Pachnistis periochra Meyrick, 1916

Species of moth

Parallactis periochra is a moth in the family Autostichidae. It was described by Edward Meyrick in 1916. It is found in Malawi.

The wingspan is about 19 mm. The forewings are brownish ochreous. The discal stigmata are cloudy, dark fuscous, the plical minute, indistinct, somewhat beyond the first discal. There is a series of small indistinct dark fuscous dots just before the apical part of the costa and termen. The hindwings are whitish grey ochreous.
