= Dicranucha sterictis =

Scientific classification
- Domain: Eukaryota
- Kingdom: Animalia
- Phylum: Arthropoda
- Class: Insecta
- Order: Lepidoptera
- Family: Gelechiidae
- Genus: Dicranucha
- Species: D. sterictis

Binomial name
- Dicranucha sterictis (Meyrick, 1908)

Synonyms
- Brachmia sterictis Meyrick, 1908

Species of moth

Dicranucha sterictis is a moth of the family Gelechiidae. It was described by Edward Meyrick in 1908. It is found in Mozambique, Namibia, Zimbabwe and Gauteng, South Africa.

The wingspan is 15–16 mm. The forewings are whitish ochreous tinged with yellow ochreous and with the extreme base of the costa dark fuscous. The stigmata are small and blackish, the plical obliquely before the first discal, the second discal larger. There is a row of ill-defined blackish dots immediately before the termen and apical portion of the costa. The hindwings are pale whitish grey.
