= Frisilia drimyla =

Scientific classification
- Domain: Eukaryota
- Kingdom: Animalia
- Phylum: Arthropoda
- Class: Insecta
- Order: Lepidoptera
- Family: Lecithoceridae
- Genus: Frisilia
- Species: F. drimyla

Binomial name
- Frisilia drimyla Diakonoff, [1968]

Species of moth

Frisilia drimyla is a moth in the family Lecithoceridae. It was described by Alexey Diakonoff in 1968. It is found on Luzon in the Philippines.

The wingspan is about 15 mm. The forewings are light ochreous tawny, irregularly suffused with fuscous. The base of the costa with a fuscous, attenuated streak and the dorsum from the base to beyond the middle with a faint fuscous suffusion. The discal stigmata are rather large, very faint, suffused and brownish. The plical stigma is conspicuous, elongate and dark brown, slightly closer to second the discal than to the first discal stigma. The hindwings are semipellucent with distinct blue reflections.
