= Frisilia homalistis =

Scientific classification
- Kingdom: Animalia
- Phylum: Arthropoda
- Class: Insecta
- Order: Lepidoptera
- Family: Lecithoceridae
- Genus: Frisilia
- Species: F. homalistis

Binomial name
- Frisilia homalistis Meyrick, 1935

Species of moth

Frisilia homalistis is a moth in the family Lecithoceridae. It is endemic to Taiwan.

== Description ==
The wingspan is 15–17 mm. The forewings are light yellow with two clearly visible discal dots.
