= Metarbelodes obliqualinea =

Scientific classification
- Domain: Eukaryota
- Kingdom: Animalia
- Phylum: Arthropoda
- Class: Insecta
- Order: Lepidoptera
- Family: Cossidae
- Genus: Metarbelodes
- Species: M. obliqualinea

Binomial name
- Metarbelodes obliqualinea (Bethune-Baker, 1909)

Synonyms
- Metarbela obliqualinea Bethune-Baker, 1909

Species of moth

Metarbelodes obliqualinea is a moth in the family Cossidae described by George Thomas Bethune-Baker in 1909. It is found in Kenya and Uganda.
