= Frisilia heliapta =

Scientific classification
- Kingdom: Animalia
- Phylum: Arthropoda
- Class: Insecta
- Order: Lepidoptera
- Family: Lecithoceridae
- Genus: Frisilia
- Species: F. heliapta

Binomial name
- Frisilia heliapta (Meyrick, 1887)

Synonyms
- Macrernis heliapta Meyrick, 1887

Species of moth

Frisilia heliapta is a moth in the family Lecithoceridae. It was described by Edward Meyrick in 1887. It is found in Sri Lanka.

The wingspan is about 14 mm. The forewings are reddish ochreous, with scattered black scales, especially towards the costa and inner margin. The base of the costa is dark fuscous and there is a black dot in the disc at one-third, and a second at two-thirds, as well as a blackish apical dot. The hindwings are pale grey, posteriorly paler and tinged with whitish ochreous.
