= Dicranucha strepsigramma =

Scientific classification
- Domain: Eukaryota
- Kingdom: Animalia
- Phylum: Arthropoda
- Class: Insecta
- Order: Lepidoptera
- Family: Gelechiidae
- Genus: Dicranucha
- Species: D. strepsigramma

Binomial name
- Dicranucha strepsigramma (Meyrick, 1937)

Synonyms
- Brachmia strepsigramma Meyrick, 1937

Species of moth

Dicranucha strepsigramma is a moth of the family Gelechiidae. It was described by Edward Meyrick in 1937. It is found in South Africa.
