= Dicranucha homochroma =

Scientific classification
- Domain: Eukaryota
- Kingdom: Animalia
- Phylum: Arthropoda
- Class: Insecta
- Order: Lepidoptera
- Family: Gelechiidae
- Genus: Dicranucha
- Species: D. homochroma

Binomial name
- Dicranucha homochroma Janse, 1954

Species of moth

Dicranucha homochroma is a moth in the family Gelechiidae. It was described by Anthonie Johannes Theodorus Janse in 1954. It is found in Namibia and South Africa.

The wingspan is 11–13 mm.
