= Eridachtha parvella =

Scientific classification
- Domain: Eukaryota
- Kingdom: Animalia
- Phylum: Arthropoda
- Class: Insecta
- Order: Lepidoptera
- Family: Lecithoceridae
- Genus: Eridachtha
- Species: E. parvella

Binomial name
- Eridachtha parvella (Chrétien, 1915)

Synonyms
- Symmoca parvella Chrétien, 1915

Species of moth

Eridachtha parvella is a moth in the family Lecithoceridae. It was described by Pierre Chrétien in 1915. It is found in Algeria.

The wingspan is about 9 mm (0.35 in). The forewings are white. The hindwings are white and somewhat bronzy along the external margin.
