= Microschismus cymatias =

Scientific classification
- Kingdom: Animalia
- Phylum: Arthropoda
- Class: Insecta
- Order: Lepidoptera
- Family: Alucitidae
- Genus: Microschismus
- Species: M. cymatias

Binomial name
- Microschismus cymatias Meyrick, 1918

Species of moth

Microschismus cymatias is a species of moth of the family Alucitidae. It is known from South Africa.
