= Frisilia notifica =

Scientific classification
- Kingdom: Animalia
- Phylum: Arthropoda
- Class: Insecta
- Order: Lepidoptera
- Family: Lecithoceridae
- Genus: Frisilia
- Species: F. notifica

Binomial name
- Frisilia notifica Meyrick, 1910

Species of moth

Frisilia notifica is a moth in the family Lecithoceridae. It was described by Edward Meyrick in 1910. It is found in Sri Lanka.

The wingspan is 15–17 mm. The forewings of the males are ochreous brownish, sprinkled with dark fuscous and suffused with deep yellow ochreous along the subdorsal groove, which is straight. The forewings of the females are brown, irrorated (sprinkled) with dark fuscous and with the costa suffused with dark fuscous towards the base. The discal stigmata are dark fuscous and rather cloudy, the first forming a moderate large dot, the second a transverse oblong slightly oblique mark, The termen is more or less suffused with dark fuscous. The hindwings are grey.
