= Boadicea (moth) =

Scientific classification
- Kingdom: Animalia
- Phylum: Arthropoda
- Class: Insecta
- Order: Lepidoptera
- Superfamily: Noctuoidea
- Family: Erebidae
- Subfamily: Arctiinae
- Tribe: Lithosiini
- Genus: Boadicea; Tams, 1930

Genus of moths

Boadicea is a genus of moths in the subfamily Arctiinae.

== Species ==
- Boadicea flavimacula Pinhey, 1968
- Boadicea pelecoides Tams, 1930
