= Boadicea pelecoides =

Scientific classification
- Kingdom: Animalia
- Phylum: Arthropoda
- Class: Insecta
- Order: Lepidoptera
- Superfamily: Noctuoidea
- Family: Erebidae
- Subfamily: Arctiinae
- Genus: Boadicea
- Species: B. pelecoides

Binomial name
- Boadicea pelecoides Tams, 1930

Species of moth

Boadicea pelecoides is a moth of the subfamily Arctiinae first described by Willie Horace Thomas Tams in 1930. It is found in the Republic of the Congo.
