= Amphixystis anachoreta =

Scientific classification
- Kingdom: Animalia
- Phylum: Arthropoda
- Class: Insecta
- Order: Lepidoptera
- Family: Tineidae
- Genus: Amphixystis
- Species: A. anachoreta

Binomial name
- Amphixystis anachoreta (Meyrick, 1921)

Synonyms
- Hieroxestis anachoreta Meyrick, 1921

Species of moth

Amphixystis anachoreta is a moth of the family Tineidae. It was described by Edward Meyrick in 1921 and is found in Zimbabwe.

This species has a wingspan of 9mm. Its forewings are glossy light greyish-ochreous; markings formed by dark fuscous irrorations. .

== Related pages ==
- List of moths of Zimbabwe
