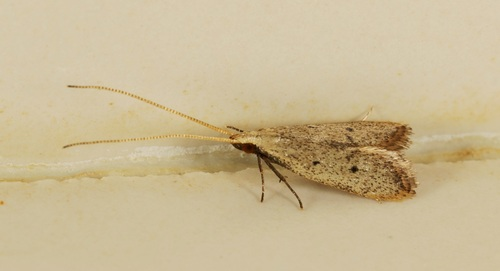

Scientific classification
- Kingdom: Animalia
- Phylum: Arthropoda
- Clade: Pancrustacea
- Class: Insecta
- Order: Lepidoptera
- Family: Lecithoceridae
- Genus: Frisilia
- Species: F. chinensis

Binomial name
- Frisilia chinensis Gozmány, 1978

= Frisilia chinensis =

Species of moth

Frisilia chinensis is a moth in the family Lecithoceridae. It is found in Taiwan and Sichuan, China.

== Description ==
The wingspan is 12.5–13.5 mm.
