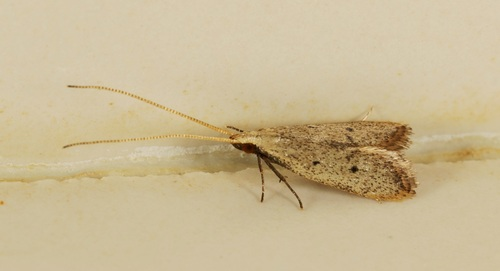
- Frisilia chinensis

Scientific classification
- Kingdom: Animalia
- Phylum: Arthropoda
- Clade: Pancrustacea
- Class: Insecta
- Order: Lepidoptera
- Family: Lecithoceridae
- Subfamily: Lecithocerinae
- Genus: Frisilia; Walker, 1864

Synonyms
- Tipasa Walker, 1864; Macrernis Meyrick, 1887

= Frisilia =

Genus of moths

Frisilia is a genus of moths in the family Lecithoceridae. The genus was erected by Francis Walker in 1864.

== Species ==
- anningensis species group
  - Frisilia anningensis C. S. Wu, 1997
  - Frisilia chinensis Gozmány, 1978
  - Frisilia compsostoma Meyrick, 1921
  - Frisilia cornualis Park & C. S. Wu, 2008
  - Frisilia homalistis Meyrick, 1935
  - Frisilia melanardis Meyrick, 1910
  - Frisilia neacantha Wu & Park, 1999
  - Frisilia procentra Meyrick, 1916
  - Frisilia senilis Meyrick, 1910
  - Frisilia spuriella Park, 2005
  - Frisilia strepsiptila Meyrick, 1910
  - Frisilia sulcata Meyrick, 1910
  - Frisilia thapsina Wu & Park, 1999
  - Frisilia verticosa Meyrick, 1914
- nesciatella species group
  - Frisilia ancylosana Wu & Park, 1999
  - Frisilia asiana Park, 2005
  - Frisilia ceylonica Park, 2001
  - Frisilia dipsia Meyrick, 1910
  - Frisilia forficatella Park, 2005
  - Frisilia heliapta (Meyrick, 1887)
  - Frisilia moriutii Park, 2005
  - Frisilia nesciatella Walker, 1864
  - Frisilia nesiotes Park & C. S. Wu, 2008
  - Frisilia notifica Meyrick, 1910
  - Frisilia rostrata (Meyrick, 1906)
  - Frisilia sejuncta Meyrick, 1929
  - Frisilia tricrosura Wu & Park, 1999
  - Frisilia triturata Meyrick, 1914
  - Frisilia trizeugma Wu & Park, 1999
- Species group incertae sedis
  - Frisilia crossophaea (Meyrick, 1931)
  - Frisilia drimyla Diakonoff, [1968]
  - Frisilia homochlora Meyrick, 1910
  - Frisilia serrata Wu & Park, 1999
