= Apostibes nivisignata =

Scientific classification
- Domain: Eukaryota
- Kingdom: Animalia
- Phylum: Arthropoda
- Class: Insecta
- Order: Lepidoptera
- Family: Scythrididae
- Genus: Apostibes
- Species: A. nivisignata

Binomial name
- Apostibes nivisignata Walsingham, 1914

Species of moth

Apostibes nivisignata is a moth of the family Scythrididae. It was described by Lord Walsingham in 1914. It is found in Mexico (Guerrero).

The wingspan is about 11 mm. The forewings are shining, pale bronzy fuscous, becoming dark purplish fuscous at the apex and through the apical cilia. From the middle of the base runs a silvery white streak along the fold, nearly to the wing-middle, where it is suddenly depressed and diffused to the dorsum. This is followed by a large, transverse, silvery white patch at the end of the cell, reaching the dorsum, and nearly reaching the costa, slightly bowed inward at its middle. The hindwings are dark bronzy fuscous.
