= Apostibes afghana =

Scientific classification
- Domain: Eukaryota
- Kingdom: Animalia
- Phylum: Arthropoda
- Class: Insecta
- Order: Lepidoptera
- Family: Scythrididae
- Genus: Apostibes
- Species: A. afghana

Binomial name
- Apostibes afghana Passerin d'Entrèves & Roggero, 2003

Species of moth

Apostibes afghana is a moth of the family Scythrididae. It was described by Pietro Passerin d'Entrèves and Angela Roggero in 2003. It is found in north-eastern Afghanistan.

The length of the forewings is 12-13.5 mm.
