= Frisilia nesiotes =

Scientific classification
- Kingdom: Animalia
- Phylum: Arthropoda
- Clade: Pancrustacea
- Class: Insecta
- Order: Lepidoptera
- Family: Lecithoceridae
- Genus: Frisilia
- Species: F. nesiotes

Binomial name
- Frisilia nesiotes Park & C. S. Wu, 2008

Species of moth

Frisilia nesiotes is a moth in the family Lecithoceridae. It was described by Kyu-Tek Park and Chun-Sheng Wu in 2008. It is found in Sri Lanka.

The wingspan is 14–15 mm.

== Etymology ==
The species name is derived from the Greek nesiote (meaning islander).
