= Dicranucha albicincta =

Scientific classification
- Domain: Eukaryota
- Kingdom: Animalia
- Phylum: Arthropoda
- Class: Insecta
- Order: Lepidoptera
- Family: Gelechiidae
- Genus: Dicranucha
- Species: D. albicincta

Binomial name
- Dicranucha albicincta (Meyrick, 1921)

Synonyms
- Brachmia albicincta Meyrick, 1921

Species of moth

Dicranucha albicincta is a moth of the family Gelechiidae. It was described by Edward Meyrick in 1921. It is found in South Africa.

The wingspan is about 14 mm. The forewings are greyish ochreous sprinkled with dark grey, especially on the veins. The stigmata are dark fuscous, edged with some whitish scales, the plical less distinct, hardly beyond the first discal. There is a suffused rather dark fuscous streak from the second discal to the apex, strongest at the apex, and a slight indistinct streak beneath it. There is also a marginal series of dark fuscous dots around the apical portion of the costa and termen. The hindwings are light grey, towards the base whitish.
