= Microschismus premnias =

Scientific classification
- Kingdom: Animalia
- Phylum: Arthropoda
- Class: Insecta
- Order: Lepidoptera
- Family: Alucitidae
- Genus: Microschismus
- Species: M. premnias

Binomial name
- Microschismus premnias Meyrick, 1913

Species of moth

Microschismus premnias is a species of moth of the family Alucitidae. It is known from South Africa.
