= Frisilia triturata =

Scientific classification
- Kingdom: Animalia
- Phylum: Arthropoda
- Class: Insecta
- Order: Lepidoptera
- Family: Lecithoceridae
- Genus: Frisilia
- Species: F. triturata

Binomial name
- Frisilia triturata Meyrick, 1914

Species of moth

Frisilia triturata is a moth in the family Lecithoceridae. It was described by Edward Meyrick in 1914. It is found in the Democratic Republic of the Congo (Katanga Province) and Malawi.

The wingspan is about 15 mm. The forewings are greyish ochreous densely irrorated (sprinkled) with dark fuscous except at the base. The edges of the subdorsal groove are ochreous. The hindwings are rather dark grey.
