= Marshalliana =

Scientific classification
- Kingdom: Animalia
- Phylum: Arthropoda
- Class: Insecta
- Order: Lepidoptera
- Family: Cossidae
- Subfamily: Metarbelinae
- Genus: Marshalliana; Aurivillius, 1901

Genus of moths

Marshalliana is a genus of moths in the family Cossidae.

== Species ==
- Marshalliana bivittata Aurivillius, 1901
- Marshalliana jansei Gaede, 1929
- Marshalliana latevittata Hering, 1949
