= Frisilia dipsia =

Scientific classification
- Kingdom: Animalia
- Phylum: Arthropoda
- Class: Insecta
- Order: Lepidoptera
- Family: Lecithoceridae
- Genus: Frisilia
- Species: F. dipsia

Binomial name
- Frisilia dipsia Meyrick, 1910

Species of moth

Frisilia dipsia is a moth in the family Lecithoceridae. It was described by Edward Meyrick in 1910. It is found in Sri Lanka.

The wingspan is 19–20 mm. The forewings are ochreous brown, considerably sprinkled with dark fuscous and with the base of the costa infuscated. The discal stigmata are dark fuscous, the first forming a rather large dot, the second a roundish spot of irroration (sprinkles) edged anteriorly by a transverse mark, lying below the middle and touching the groove. There is also a streak of dark fuscous suffusion along the termen. The hindwings are grey.
