= Apostibes mesopora =

Scientific classification
- Domain: Eukaryota
- Kingdom: Animalia
- Phylum: Arthropoda
- Class: Insecta
- Order: Lepidoptera
- Family: Scythrididae
- Genus: Apostibes
- Species: A. mesopora

Binomial name
- Apostibes mesopora Walsingham, 1914

Species of moth

Apostibes mesopora is a moth of the family Scythrididae. It was described by Lord Walsingham in 1914. It is found in Mexico (Guerrero).

The wingspan is about 14 mm. The forewings are dark bronzy fuscous, with a whitish cinereous line running from the middle of the base to the end of the cell, and then, less conspicuously, to the apex and through the bronzy apical cilia. The hindwings are dark purplish fuscous.
