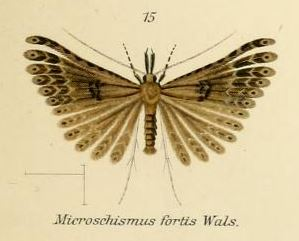

Scientific classification
- Kingdom: Animalia
- Phylum: Arthropoda
- Class: Insecta
- Order: Lepidoptera
- Family: Alucitidae
- Genus: Microschismus; T. B. Fletcher, 1909

Synonyms
- Macrembola Meyrick, 1909

= Microschismus =

Genus of moths

Microschismus is a genus of moths in the family Alucitidae.

== Species ==
- Microschismus antennatus T. B. Fletcher, 1909 (South Africa)
- Microschismus cymatias Meyrick, 1918
- Microschismus fortis (Walsingham, 1881)
- Microschismus lenzi Ustjuzhanin & Kovtunovich, 2011 (Zimbabwe)
- Microschismus premnias Meyrick, 1913
- Microschismus reginus Ustjuzhanin & Kovtunovich, 2011 (South Africa)
- Microschismus sceletias Meyrick, 1911
- Microschismus sterkfontein Ustjuzhanin & Kovtunovich, 2011 (South Africa)
