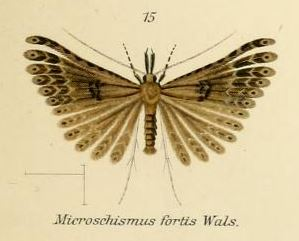

Scientific classification
- Domain: Eukaryota
- Kingdom: Animalia
- Phylum: Arthropoda
- Class: Insecta
- Order: Lepidoptera
- Family: Alucitidae
- Genus: Microschismus
- Species: M. fortis

Binomial name
- Microschismus fortis (Walsingham, 1881)

Synonyms
- Alucita fortis Walsingham, 1881; Microschismus serricornis Meyrick, 1914

= Microschismus fortis =

Species of moth

Microschismus fortis is a species of moth of the family Alucitidae. It is known from South Africa.
