= Frisilia sejuncta =

Scientific classification
- Kingdom: Animalia
- Phylum: Arthropoda
- Class: Insecta
- Order: Lepidoptera
- Family: Lecithoceridae
- Genus: Frisilia
- Species: F. sejuncta

Binomial name
- Frisilia sejuncta Meyrick, 1929

Species of moth

Frisilia sejuncta is a moth in the family Lecithoceridae. It was described by Edward Meyrick in 1929. It is found in southern India and Sri Lanka.

The wingspan is 12–13 mm.
