= Dicranucha serialis =

Scientific classification
- Domain: Eukaryota
- Kingdom: Animalia
- Phylum: Arthropoda
- Class: Insecta
- Order: Lepidoptera
- Family: Gelechiidae
- Genus: Dicranucha
- Species: D. serialis

Binomial name
- Dicranucha serialis (Meyrick, 1908)

Synonyms
- Brachmia serialis Meyrick, 1908; Brachmia ochyrota Meyrick, 1920

Species of moth

Dicranucha serialis is a moth of the family Gelechiidae. It was described by Edward Meyrick in 1908. It is found in the Democratic Republic of the Congo (Equateur, Katanga), Mozambique and Gauteng, South Africa.

The wingspan is about 14 mm. The forewings are pale ochreous suffusedly irrorated (sprinkled) with fuscous and with blackish basal dots on the costa and in the middle. The stigmata are blackish, the plical rather obliquely before the first discal. There is a row of undefined blackish dots immediately before the termen and apical part of the costa, terminating in a small suffused dark fuscous pre-tornal spot. The hindwings are grey.

The larvae feed on Coleus species.
