= Apostibes inota =

Scientific classification
- Domain: Eukaryota
- Kingdom: Animalia
- Phylum: Arthropoda
- Class: Insecta
- Order: Lepidoptera
- Family: Scythrididae
- Genus: Apostibes
- Species: A. inota

Binomial name
- Apostibes inota (Meyrick, 1924)

Synonyms
- Scythris inota Meyrick, 1924

Species of insect

Apostibes inota is a moth of the family Scythrididae. It was described by Edward Meyrick in 1924. It is found in Pakistan, northern India and eastern Afghanistan.

The length of the forewings is 12.5–14 mm.
