= Polysoma clarki =

Scientific classification
- Kingdom: Animalia
- Phylum: Arthropoda
- Class: Insecta
- Order: Lepidoptera
- Family: Gracillariidae
- Genus: Polysoma
- Species: P. clarki

Binomial name
- Polysoma clarki Vári, 1961

Species of moth

Polysoma clarki is a moth of the family Gracillariidae. It is known from South Africa.
