= Frisilia rostrata =

Scientific classification
- Kingdom: Animalia
- Phylum: Arthropoda
- Class: Insecta
- Order: Lepidoptera
- Family: Lecithoceridae
- Genus: Frisilia
- Species: F. rostrata

Binomial name
- Frisilia rostrata (Meyrick, 1906)

Synonyms
- Macrernis rostrata Meyrick, 1906

Species of moth

Frisilia rostrata is a moth in the family Lecithoceridae. It was described by Edward Meyrick in 1906. It is found in Sri Lanka.

The wingspan is 18–21 mm. The forewings are brownish ochreous, with a few scattered dark fuscous scales and a dark fuscous mark along the base of the costa. There is a dark fuscous streak of somewhat raised scales along the dorsum from the base to the tornus, enclosing a groove along vein 1b, with a flap of hairscales curved over it from above towards the base, the upper edge of the streak with two strong projections at one-third and three-fifths, the first triangular, reaching halfway across the wing, the second fascia like, parallel to the termen, reaching above the middle of the wing. There is also a suffused dark fuscous streak along the termen. The hindwings are whitish ochreous grey.
