= Eridachtha =

Scientific classification
- Kingdom: Animalia
- Phylum: Arthropoda
- Class: Insecta
- Order: Lepidoptera
- Family: Lecithoceridae
- Subfamily: Lecithocerinae
- Genus: Eridachtha; Meyrick, 1910

Synonyms
- Corthyntis Meyrick, 1916

Genus of moths

Eridachtha is a genus of moth in the family Lecithoceridae.

== Species ==
- Eridachtha calamopis Meyrick, 1920
- Eridachtha crossogramma (Meyrick, 1921)
- Eridachtha hapalochra Meyrick, 1932
- Eridachtha guttifera Gozmány, 1973
- Eridachtha kasyella Gozmány, 1978
- Eridachtha longicornella (Chrétien, 1915)
- Eridachtha parvella (Chrétien, 1915)
- Eridachtha phaeochlora Meyrick, 1920
- Eridachtha prolocha Meyrick, 1910
