= Parallactis plaesiodes =

Scientific classification
- Domain: Eukaryota
- Kingdom: Animalia
- Phylum: Arthropoda
- Class: Insecta
- Order: Lepidoptera
- Family: Autostichidae
- Genus: Parallactis
- Species: P. plaesiodes

Binomial name
- Parallactis plaesiodes (Meyrick, 1920)

Synonyms
- Pachnistis plaesiodes Meyrick, 1920; Brachmia derogata Meyrick, 1921

Species of moth

Parallactis plaesiodes is a moth in the family Autostichidae. It was described by Edward Meyrick in 1920. It is found in Kenya, Mozambique and South Africa.

The wingspan is 13–14 mm. The forewings are ochreous, slightly tinged with brownish. The discal stigmata are moderate and blackish, the plical minute, fuscous and beneath the first discal. There is an indistinct slightly oblique fuscous shade from the second discal to the dorsum and some cloudy dark fuscous marginal dots around the apex and upper part of the termen. The hindwings are pale ochreous faintly tinged with grey towards the dorsum.
