= Frisilia anningensis =

Scientific classification
- Domain: Eukaryota
- Kingdom: Animalia
- Phylum: Arthropoda
- Class: Insecta
- Order: Lepidoptera
- Family: Lecithoceridae
- Genus: Frisilia
- Species: F. anningensis

Binomial name
- Frisilia anningensis Wu, 1997

Species of moth

Frisilia anningensis is a moth in the family Lecithoceridae. It is found in China (Yunnan).

The wingspan is about 19 mm.
