= Eridachtha hapalochra =

Scientific classification
- Kingdom: Animalia
- Phylum: Arthropoda
- Class: Insecta
- Order: Lepidoptera
- Family: Lecithoceridae
- Genus: Eridachtha
- Species: E. hapalochra

Binomial name
- Eridachtha hapalochra Meyrick, 1932

Species of moth

Eridachtha hapalochra is a moth in the family Lecithoceridae. It was described by Edward Meyrick in 1932. It is found in Guinea.
