= Frisilia ancylosana =

Scientific classification
- Kingdom: Animalia
- Phylum: Arthropoda
- Clade: Pancrustacea
- Class: Insecta
- Order: Lepidoptera
- Family: Lecithoceridae
- Genus: Frisilia
- Species: F. ancylosana

Binomial name
- Frisilia ancylosana Wu & Park, 1999

Species of moth

Frisilia ancylosana is a moth in the family Lecithoceridae. It was described by Chun-Sheng Wu and Kyu-Tek Park in 1999. It is found in Sri Lanka.

The wingspan is 10–12 mm.
