= Microschismus sterkfontein =

Scientific classification
- Kingdom: Animalia
- Phylum: Arthropoda
- Clade: Pancrustacea
- Class: Insecta
- Order: Lepidoptera
- Family: Alucitidae
- Genus: Microschismus
- Species: M. sterkfontein

Binomial name
- Microschismus sterkfontein Ustjuzhanin & Kovtunovich, 2011

Species of moth

Microschismus sterkfontein is a species of moth of the family Alucitidae. It is found in South Africa.
