= Zobida trinitas =

Scientific classification
- Kingdom: Animalia
- Phylum: Arthropoda
- Clade: Pancrustacea
- Class: Insecta
- Order: Lepidoptera
- Superfamily: Noctuoidea
- Family: Erebidae
- Subfamily: Arctiinae
- Genus: Zobida
- Species: Z. trinitas

Binomial name
- Zobida trinitas (Strand, 1912)

Synonyms
- Eilema trinitas Strand, 1912; Ilema jacobsi Hampson, 1914; Eilema jacobsi

Species of moth

Zobida trinitas is a moth of the subfamily Arctiinae first described by Embrik Strand in 1912. It is found in Cameroon, Ghana, Kenya, Nigeria, Togo and Morocco.
