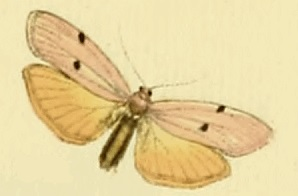

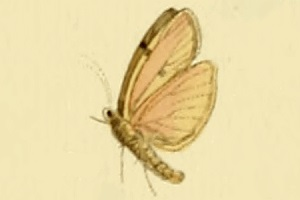

Scientific classification
- Kingdom: Animalia
- Phylum: Arthropoda
- Clade: Pancrustacea
- Class: Insecta
- Order: Lepidoptera
- Superfamily: Noctuoidea
- Family: Erebidae
- Subfamily: Arctiinae
- Genus: Zobida
- Species: Z. bipuncta

Binomial name
- Zobida bipuncta (Hübner, [1824])

Synonyms
- Bombyx bipuncta Hübner, [1824]; Eilema bipuncta; Ilema jacobsi f. bipunctoides Rungs, 1941

= Zobida bipuncta =

Species of moth

Zobida bipuncta is a moth of the subfamily Arctiinae. It is found in Larache, Morocco and the southern part of the Iberian Peninsula.
