= Dicranucha legalis =

Scientific classification
- Kingdom: Animalia
- Phylum: Arthropoda
- Clade: Pancrustacea
- Class: Insecta
- Order: Lepidoptera
- Family: Gelechiidae
- Genus: Dicranucha
- Species: D. legalis

Binomial name
- Dicranucha legalis (Meyrick, 1921)

Synonyms
- Brachmia legalis Meyrick, 1921

Species of moth

Dicranucha legalis is a moth of the family Gelechiidae. It was described by Edward Meyrick in 1921. It is found in Mozambique.

The wingspan is about 13 mm. The forewings are rather dark purplish fuscous. The stigmata cloudy, blackish, the plical rather obliquely before the first discal. The hindwings are grey whitish.
