= Dicranucha ochrostoma =

Scientific classification
- Domain: Eukaryota
- Kingdom: Animalia
- Phylum: Arthropoda
- Class: Insecta
- Order: Lepidoptera
- Family: Gelechiidae
- Genus: Dicranucha
- Species: D. ochrostoma

Binomial name
- Dicranucha ochrostoma (Meyrick, 1913)

Synonyms
- Brachmia ochrostoma Meyrick, 1913

Species of moth

Dicranucha ochrostoma is a moth in the family Gelechiidae. It was described by Edward Meyrick in 1913. It is found in South Africa.

The wingspan is about 13 mm. The forewings are dark ashy grey, with the veins and fold suffusedly streaked with black and with the plical and first discal stigmata indicated by small groups of whitish scales, the plical obliquely before the first discal. There is a larger whitish dot on the fold near the extremity and a few scattered whitish scales on the apical part of the costa and termen. The hindwings are pale grey.
