= Apostibes raguae =

Scientific classification
- Kingdom: Animalia
- Phylum: Arthropoda
- Clade: Pancrustacea
- Class: Insecta
- Order: Lepidoptera
- Family: Scythrididae
- Genus: Apostibes
- Species: A. raguae

Binomial name
- Apostibes raguae Bengtsson, 1997

Species of moth

Apostibes raguae is a moth of the family Scythrididae. It was described by Bengt Å. Bengtsson in 1997. It is found in Spain.
