= Microschismus sceletias =

Scientific classification
- Kingdom: Animalia
- Phylum: Arthropoda
- Class: Insecta
- Order: Lepidoptera
- Family: Alucitidae
- Genus: Microschismus
- Species: M. sceletias

Binomial name
- Microschismus sceletias Meyrick, 1911

Species of moth

Microschismus sceletias is a species of moth of the family Alucitidae. It is known from South Africa.
