= Eridachtha prolocha =

Scientific classification
- Kingdom: Animalia
- Phylum: Arthropoda
- Class: Insecta
- Order: Lepidoptera
- Family: Lecithoceridae
- Genus: Eridachtha
- Species: E. prolocha

Binomial name
- Eridachtha prolocha Meyrick, 1910

Synonyms
- Corthyntis chlorotricha Meyrick, 1916

Species of moth

Eridachtha prolocha is a moth in the family Lecithoceridae. It was described by Edward Meyrick in 1910. It is found in southern India.

The wingspan is 15–16 mm. The forewings are grey brown and the hindwings are grey.
