= Frisilia sulcata =

Scientific classification
- Kingdom: Animalia
- Phylum: Arthropoda
- Class: Insecta
- Order: Lepidoptera
- Family: Lecithoceridae
- Genus: Frisilia
- Species: F. sulcata

Binomial name
- Frisilia sulcata Meyrick, 1910

Species of moth

Frisilia sulcata is a moth in the family Lecithoceridae. It was described by Edward Meyrick in 1910. It is found in Nepal and Assam, India.

The wingspan is 18–20 mm. The forewings are deep yellow ochreous, sprinkled with dark fuscous specks, in females brownish tinged. The costal edge is dark fuscous towards the base. The discal stigmata are dot like, black and conspicuous and there is a slender streak of dark fuscous suffusion along the termen from the apex to near the tornus. The hindwings are pale grey.
