= Frisilia ceylonica =

Scientific classification
- Kingdom: Animalia
- Phylum: Arthropoda
- Clade: Pancrustacea
- Class: Insecta
- Order: Lepidoptera
- Family: Lecithoceridae
- Genus: Frisilia
- Species: F. ceylonica

Binomial name
- Frisilia ceylonica Park, 2001

Species of moth

Frisilia ceylonica is a moth in the family Lecithoceridae. It was described by Kyu-Tek Park in 2001. It is found in Sri Lanka.

The wingspan is 12.5–13 mm.
