= Apostibes aerata =

Scientific classification
- Domain: Eukaryota
- Kingdom: Animalia
- Phylum: Arthropoda
- Class: Insecta
- Order: Lepidoptera
- Family: Scythrididae
- Genus: Apostibes
- Species: A. aerata

Binomial name
- Apostibes aerata Walsingham, 1914

Species of moth

Apostibes aerata is a moth of the family Scythrididae. It was described by Lord Walsingham in 1914. It is found in Mexico (Guerrero).

The wingspan is about 12 mm. The forewings are shining, pale brassy greenish, becoming more coppery towards the costa and at the apex. A white streak coming from the base below the costa terminates in the fold at about one-fourth, and there is a white patch lying a little beyond it and reaching the costa before the middle, a similar white patch, bent inward from the costa before the apex and reverting to the dorsum is found at the end of the fold. The hindwings are dark reddish fuscous.
