= Frisilia homochlora =

Scientific classification
- Kingdom: Animalia
- Phylum: Arthropoda
- Clade: Pancrustacea
- Class: Insecta
- Order: Lepidoptera
- Family: Lecithoceridae
- Genus: Frisilia
- Species: F. homochlora

Binomial name
- Frisilia homochlora Meyrick, 1910

Species of moth

Frisilia homochlora is a moth in the family Lecithoceridae. It was described by Edward Meyrick in 1910. It is found in southern India and Jiangxi, China.

The wingspan is about 22 mm. The forewings are pale ochreous with the costal edge infuscated at the base. The discal stigmata are cloudy and dark fuscous, the first dot like, the second extends across the transverse vein and is subcrescentic. There is some slight infuscation along the termen. The hindwings are whitish ochreous.
