= Parallactis zorophanes =

Scientific classification
- Domain: Eukaryota
- Kingdom: Animalia
- Phylum: Arthropoda
- Class: Insecta
- Order: Lepidoptera
- Family: Autostichidae
- Genus: Parallactis
- Species: P. zorophanes

Binomial name
- Parallactis zorophanes Janse, 1954

Species of moth

Parallactis zorophanes is a moth in the family Autostichidae. It was described by Anthonie Johannes Theodorus Janse in 1954. It is found in South Africa.
