= Dicranucha =

Scientific classification
- Domain: Eukaryota
- Kingdom: Animalia
- Phylum: Arthropoda
- Class: Insecta
- Order: Lepidoptera
- Family: Gelechiidae
- Genus: Dicranucha; Janse, 1954

Genus of moths

Dicranucha is a genus of moths in the family Gelechiidae.

== Species ==
- Dicranucha albicincta (Meyrick, 1921)
- Dicranucha crateropis (Meyrick, 1921)
- Dicranucha dicksoni Janse, 1963
- Dicranucha homochroma Janse, 1954
- Dicranucha legalis (Meyrick, 1921)
- Dicranucha nephelopis (Meyrick, 1921)
- Dicranucha ochrostoma (Meyrick, 1913)
- Dicranucha serialis (Meyrick, 1908)
- Dicranucha sterictis (Meyrick, 1908)
- Dicranucha strepsigramma (Meyrick, 1937)
