= Zobida colon =

Scientific classification
- Domain: Eukaryota
- Kingdom: Animalia
- Phylum: Arthropoda
- Class: Insecta
- Order: Lepidoptera
- Superfamily: Noctuoidea
- Family: Erebidae
- Subfamily: Arctiinae
- Genus: Zobida
- Species: Z. colon

Binomial name
- Zobida colon (Möschler, 1872)

Synonyms
- Lithosia colon Möschler, 1872; Eilema colon; Eilema tetrasticta Hampson, 1900

Species of moth

Zobida colon is a moth of the subfamily Arctiinae first described by Heinrich Benno Möschler in 1872. It is found in Ethiopia, South Africa and Bangladesh.
