= Frisilia procentra =

Scientific classification
- Kingdom: Animalia
- Phylum: Arthropoda
- Class: Insecta
- Order: Lepidoptera
- Family: Lecithoceridae
- Genus: Frisilia
- Species: F. procentra

Binomial name
- Frisilia procentra Meyrick, 1916

Species of moth

Frisilia procentra is a moth in the family Lecithoceridae. It was described by Edward Meyrick in 1916. It is found in southern India.

The wingspan is about 17 mm. The forewings are greyish ochreous sprinkled with dark fuscous and with a dark fuscous dot above the subdorsal groove at one-fifth. The discal stigmata are dark fuscous, the first moderate, the second cloudy, where a slightly curved, somewhat oblique fuscous shade runs to the dorsum. There is also a streak of fuscous suffusion along the termen. The hindwings are grey.
