= Frisilia crossophaea =

Scientific classification
- Domain: Eukaryota
- Kingdom: Animalia
- Phylum: Arthropoda
- Class: Insecta
- Order: Lepidoptera
- Family: Lecithoceridae
- Genus: Frisilia
- Species: F. crossophaea

Binomial name
- Frisilia crossophaea (Meyrick, 1931)

Synonyms
- Lecithocera crossophaea Meyrick, 1931

Species of moth

Frisilia crossophaea is a moth in the family Lecithoceridae. It is found in Sikkim, India. Only holotype, a female, is known.
