= Frisilia nesciatella =

Scientific classification
- Kingdom: Animalia
- Phylum: Arthropoda
- Class: Insecta
- Order: Lepidoptera
- Family: Lecithoceridae
- Genus: Frisilia
- Species: F. nesciatella

Binomial name
- Frisilia nesciatella Walker, 1864

Synonyms
- Tipasa basaliella Walker, 1864

Species of moth

Frisilia nesciatella is a moth in the family Lecithoceridae. It was described by Francis Walker in 1864. It is found in Sri Lanka.

The wingspan is 10–11 mm. Adults are testaceous (brick red), the wings with a slight brown line along the exterior border. The forewings are slightly speckled with brown and there are two black discal points, one before and one beyond the middle.
