= Parallactis mitigata =

Scientific classification
- Domain: Eukaryota
- Kingdom: Animalia
- Phylum: Arthropoda
- Class: Insecta
- Order: Lepidoptera
- Family: Autostichidae
- Genus: Parallactis
- Species: P. mitigata

Binomial name
- Parallactis mitigata (Meyrick, 1914)

Synonyms
- Pachnistis mitigata Meyrick, 1914

Species of moth

Parallactis mitigata is a moth in the family Autostichidae. It was described by Edward Meyrick in 1914. It is found in Malawi.

The wingspan is 17–18 mm. The forewings are ochreous yellow. The second discal stigma is moderate, brownish and connected with the tornus by a very faint brownish-yellow shade. The hindwings are light yellowish grey.
