= Frisilia strepsiptila =

Scientific classification
- Kingdom: Animalia
- Phylum: Arthropoda
- Class: Insecta
- Order: Lepidoptera
- Family: Lecithoceridae
- Genus: Frisilia
- Species: F. strepsiptila

Binomial name
- Frisilia strepsiptila Meyrick, 1910

Species of moth

Frisilia strepsiptila is a moth in the family Lecithoceridae. It was described by Edward Meyrick in 1910. It is found in southern India.

The wingspan is 18–20 mm. The forewings are brownish ochreous, thinly sprinkled with dark fuscous specks and with the costal edge infuscated towards the base. The discal stigmata are dark fuscous, the first dot like, the second forming a crescentic dot, where a rather oblique streak of fuscous or dark fuscous irroration (sprinkling) runs towards the dorsum. The termen is somewhat infuscated from the apex to near the tornus. The hindwings are whitish ochreous tinged with fuscous, more infuscated posteriorly. In males, there is a long pencil of whitish-ochreous hairs lying along the costa from the base.
