= Frisilia asiana =

Scientific classification
- Kingdom: Animalia
- Phylum: Arthropoda
- Clade: Pancrustacea
- Class: Insecta
- Order: Lepidoptera
- Family: Lecithoceridae
- Genus: Frisilia
- Species: F. asiana

Binomial name
- Frisilia asiana Park, 2005

Species of moth

Frisilia asiana is a moth in the family Lecithoceridae. It was described by Kyu-Tek Park in 2005. It is found in Thailand.

The wingspan is 10–12 mm.
