= Metarbelodes =

Scientific classification
- Domain: Eukaryota
- Kingdom: Animalia
- Phylum: Arthropoda
- Class: Insecta
- Order: Lepidoptera
- Family: Cossidae
- Subfamily: Metarbelinae
- Genus: Metarbelodes; Strand, 1909

Genus of moths

Metarbelodes is a genus of moths in the family Cossidae.

== Species ==
- Metarbelodes obliqualinea Bethune-Baker, 1909
- Metarbelodes umtaliana Aurivillius, 1901

== Former species ==
- Metarbelodes ngazidya Viette, 1981
