= Zobida =

Scientific classification
- Domain: Eukaryota
- Kingdom: Animalia
- Phylum: Arthropoda
- Class: Insecta
- Order: Lepidoptera
- Superfamily: Noctuoidea
- Family: Erebidae
- Subfamily: Arctiinae
- Subtribe: Lithosiina
- Genus: Zobida; Birket-Smith, 1965

Genus of moths

Zobida is a genus of moths in the subfamily Arctiinae.

Most species were previously placed in the genus Eilema.

== Species ==
- Zobida avifex Kühne, 2010
- Zobida bipuncta (Hübner, [1824])
- Zobida colon (Möschler, 1872)
- Zobida trinitas (Strand, 1912)
