= Dicranucha dicksoni =

Scientific classification
- Domain: Eukaryota
- Kingdom: Animalia
- Phylum: Arthropoda
- Class: Insecta
- Order: Lepidoptera
- Family: Gelechiidae
- Genus: Dicranucha
- Species: D. dicksoni

Binomial name
- Dicranucha dicksoni Janse, 1963

Species of moth

Dicranucha dicksoni is a moth of the family Gelechiidae. It was described by Anthonie Johannes Theodorus Janse in 1963. It is found in South Africa (KwaZulu-Natal).
