= Marshalliana latevittata =

Scientific classification
- Kingdom: Animalia
- Phylum: Arthropoda
- Class: Insecta
- Order: Lepidoptera
- Family: Cossidae
- Genus: Marshalliana
- Species: M. latevittata

Binomial name
- Marshalliana latevittata Hering, 1949

Species of moth

Marshalliana latevittata is a moth in the family Cossidae. It is found in the Democratic Republic of Congo.
