= Frisilia melanardis =

Scientific classification
- Kingdom: Animalia
- Phylum: Arthropoda
- Class: Insecta
- Order: Lepidoptera
- Family: Lecithoceridae
- Genus: Frisilia
- Species: F. melanardis

Binomial name
- Frisilia melanardis Meyrick, 1910

Species of moth

Frisilia melanardis is a moth in the family Lecithoceridae. It was described by Edward Meyrick in 1910. It is found on Borneo.

The wingspan is 21–23 mm (0.83–0.91 in). The forewings are ochreous yellow with some scattered dark fuscous specks. The discal stigmata are round, dot like and blackish. In males, there is an oval glandular swelling between the dorsum and subdorsal groove in the middle. There is a suffused dark fuscous line along the upper part of the termen. The hindwings are grey, in males with a large and long expansible pencil of brownish hairs from the base of the costa lying beneath the forewings.
