= Aethiopsestis =

Scientific classification
- Domain: Eukaryota
- Kingdom: Animalia
- Phylum: Arthropoda
- Class: Insecta
- Order: Lepidoptera
- Family: Drepanidae
- Subfamily: Thyatirinae
- Genus: Aethiopsestis; Watson, 1965

Moth genus in family Drepanidae

Aethiopsestis is a genus of moths belonging to the subfamily Thyatirinae of the Drepanidae.

== Species ==
- Aethiopsestis austrina Watson, 1965
- Aethiopsestis echinata Watson, 1965
- Aethiopsestis mufindiae Watson, 1965
