= Acrocercops chrysophylli =

Scientific classification
- Domain: Eukaryota
- Kingdom: Animalia
- Phylum: Arthropoda
- Class: Insecta
- Order: Lepidoptera
- Family: Gracillariidae
- Genus: Acrocercops
- Species: A. chrysophylli

Binomial name
- Acrocercops chrysophylli Vári, 1961

Species of moth

Acrocercops chrysophylli is a moth of the family Gracillariidae. It is known from South Africa and Zimbabwe.

The larvae feed on Chrysophyllum gorungosanum. They mine the leaves of their host plant.
