= Dichomeris agathopa =

Scientific classification
- Kingdom: Animalia
- Phylum: Arthropoda
- Class: Insecta
- Order: Lepidoptera
- Family: Gelechiidae
- Genus: Dichomeris
- Species: D. agathopa

Binomial name
- Dichomeris agathopa Meyrick, 1921

Species of moth

Dichomeris agathopa is a moth in the family Gelechiidae. It was described by Edward Meyrick in 1921. It is found in Zimbabwe and the South African provinces of Limpopo, Free State and North West.

The wingspan is about 19 mm. The forewings are pale ochreous with the base of the costa blackish and with a moderate semi-oval blackish-fuscous spot on the costa beyond the middle. The hindwings are pale grey suffused with pale ochreous yellowish.
