= Dicranucha nephelopis =

Scientific classification
- Kingdom: Animalia
- Phylum: Arthropoda
- Class: Insecta
- Order: Lepidoptera
- Family: Gelechiidae
- Genus: Dicranucha
- Species: D. nephelopis

Binomial name
- Dicranucha nephelopis (Meyrick, 1921)

Synonyms
- Brachmia nephelopis Meyrick, 1921

Species of moth

Dicranucha nephelopis is a moth of the family Gelechiidae. It was described by Edward Meyrick in 1921. It is found in Zimbabwe.

The wingspan is about 13 mm. The forewings are fuscous. The discal stigmata are represented by obscure darker cloudy spots. The hindwings are grey.
