= Polysoma aenicta =

Scientific classification
- Kingdom: Animalia
- Phylum: Arthropoda
- Class: Insecta
- Order: Lepidoptera
- Family: Gracillariidae
- Genus: Polysoma
- Species: P. aenicta

Binomial name
- Polysoma aenicta Vári, 1961

Species of moth

Polysoma aenicta is a moth of the family Gracillariidae. It is known from Zimbabwe.

The larvae feed on Albizia gummifera species. They mine the leaves of their host plant. The mine has the form of a moderate, irregular, transparent blotch mine.
