= Marshalliana bivittata =

Scientific classification
- Kingdom: Animalia
- Phylum: Arthropoda
- Class: Insecta
- Order: Lepidoptera
- Family: Cossidae
- Genus: Marshalliana
- Species: M. bivittata

Binomial name
- Marshalliana bivittata Aurivillius, 1901

Species of moth

Marshalliana bivittata is a moth in the family Cossidae. It is found in Zimbabwe. There are also records from the Democratic Republic of Congo, Ethiopia, Ghana, Eritrea, Kenya and Uganda, but these need confirmation.
