= Dichomeris hercogramma =

Scientific classification
- Kingdom: Animalia
- Phylum: Arthropoda
- Class: Insecta
- Order: Lepidoptera
- Family: Gelechiidae
- Genus: Dichomeris
- Species: D. hercogramma

Binomial name
- Dichomeris hercogramma (Meyrick, 1921)

Synonyms
- Trichotaphe hercogramma Meyrick, 1921

Species of moth

Dichomeris hercogramma is a moth in the family Gelechiidae. It was described by Edward Meyrick in 1921. It is found in Zimbabwe.

The wingspan is about 13 mm. The forewings are dark violet fuscous speckled with whitish. The discal stigmata is cloudy, dark fuscous, an additional spot midway between the first and the base. There is a whitish-ochreous transverse line at four-fifths, rather indented above the middle, somewhat expanded on the costa. The edge around the apex and termen is blackish. The hindwings are grey.
