= Oederastria =

Scientific classification
- Kingdom: Animalia
- Phylum: Arthropoda
- Class: Insecta
- Order: Lepidoptera
- Superfamily: Noctuoidea
- Family: Noctuidae
- Subfamily: Acontiinae
- Genus: Oederastria; Hampson, 1902
- Species: O. ectorhoda

Binomial name
- Oederastria ectorhoda Hampson, 1902

Genus of moths

Oederastria is a monotypic moth genus of the family Noctuidae. Its only species, Oederastria ectorhoda, is found in Zimbabwe. Both the genus and species were first described by George Hampson in 1902.
