= Phyllonorycter melanosparta =

Scientific classification
- Kingdom: Animalia
- Phylum: Arthropoda
- Class: Insecta
- Order: Lepidoptera
- Family: Gracillariidae
- Genus: Phyllonorycter
- Species: P. melanosparta

Binomial name
- Phyllonorycter melanosparta (Meyrick, 1912)

Synonyms
- Lithocolletis melanosparta Meyrick, 1912

Species of moth

Phyllonorycter melanosparta is a moth of the family Gracillariidae. It is known from South Africa, Zimbabwe and western Kenya. The habitat consists of secondary woodland where forest flora intermixes with savannah plants.

The length of the forewings is 2.5–2.8 mm. Adults are on wing from late December to late January and from late March to July.

The larvae feed on Desmodium repandum, Flemingia grahamiana, Hylodesmum repandum, Rhynchosia caribaea and Vigna species. They mine the leaves of their host plant. The mine has the form of a moderate, oval, semi-transparent, tentiform mine on the upperside of the leaf.
