= Apostibes halmyrodes =

Scientific classification
- Kingdom: Animalia
- Phylum: Arthropoda
- Class: Insecta
- Order: Lepidoptera
- Family: Scythrididae
- Genus: Apostibes
- Species: A. halmyrodes

Binomial name
- Apostibes halmyrodes (Meyrick, 1921)

Synonyms
- Scythris halmyrodes Meyrick, 1921; Scythris ilyopa Meyrick, 1921

Species of moth

Apostibes halmyrodes is a moth of the family Scythrididae. It was described by Edward Meyrick in 1921. It is found in Malawi, Namibia, South Africa and Zimbabwe.

The length of the forewings is 14–15 mm. The forewings are light grey irregularly sprinkled with whitish, tending to indicate very obscure lines on the veins. The hindwings are grey.
