= Frisilia compsostoma =

Scientific classification
- Kingdom: Animalia
- Phylum: Arthropoda
- Class: Insecta
- Order: Lepidoptera
- Family: Lecithoceridae
- Genus: Frisilia
- Species: F. compsostoma

Binomial name
- Frisilia compsostoma Meyrick, 1921

Species of moth

Frisilia compsostoma is a moth in the family Lecithoceridae. It was described by Edward Meyrick in 1921. It is found in the Democratic Republic of the Congo's former Katanga Province and in Zimbabwe.

The wingspan is about 17 mm. The forewings are pale ochreous, on the posterior half thinly sprinkled with dark fuscous, the subdorsal furrow yellowish anteriorly and the base of the costa dark fuscous. The discal stigmata are small and blackish. The hindwings are grey.
