= Polysoma lithochrysa =

Scientific classification
- Kingdom: Animalia
- Phylum: Arthropoda
- Clade: Pancrustacea
- Class: Insecta
- Order: Lepidoptera
- Family: Gracillariidae
- Genus: Polysoma
- Species: P. lithochrysa

Binomial name
- Polysoma lithochrysa (Meyrick, 1930)

Synonyms
- Acrocercops lithochrysa Meyrick, 1930

Species of moth

Polysoma lithochrysa is a moth of the family Gracillariidae. It is known from South Africa, Uganda and Zimbabwe.
