= Dichomeris erixantha =

Scientific classification
- Kingdom: Animalia
- Phylum: Arthropoda
- Class: Insecta
- Order: Lepidoptera
- Family: Gelechiidae
- Genus: Dichomeris
- Species: D. erixantha

Binomial name
- Dichomeris erixantha (Meyrick, 1914)

Synonyms
- Trichotaphe erixantha Meyrick, 1914

Species of moth

Dichomeris erixantha is a moth in the family Gelechiidae. It was described by Edward Meyrick in 1914. It is found in Malawi and Zimbabwe.

The wingspan is 16–20 mm. The forewings are deep ochreous yellow. The hindwings are dark grey.
