= Dicranucha crateropis =

Scientific classification
- Domain: Eukaryota
- Kingdom: Animalia
- Phylum: Arthropoda
- Class: Insecta
- Order: Lepidoptera
- Family: Gelechiidae
- Genus: Dicranucha
- Species: D. crateropis

Binomial name
- Dicranucha crateropis (Meyrick, 1921)

Synonyms
- Brachmia crateropis Meyrick, 1921

Species of moth

Dicranucha crateropis is a moth of the family Gelechiidae. It was described by Edward Meyrick in 1921. It is found in Zimbabwe.

The wingspan is 15–16 mm. The forewings are pale ochreous, with a band along the costa and the terminal third sprinkled with dark fuscous. There are small blackish spots on the base of the costa and dorsum and sometimes a small mark between these. The stigmata are large, round and blackish, the plical beneath the first discal. There is a similar spot on the dorsum beneath the second discal and a submarginal row of large irregular blackish dots around the posterior part of the costa and termen. The hindwings are light grey.
