= Dichomeris maturata =

Scientific classification
- Kingdom: Animalia
- Phylum: Arthropoda
- Class: Insecta
- Order: Lepidoptera
- Family: Gelechiidae
- Genus: Dichomeris
- Species: D. maturata

Binomial name
- Dichomeris maturata (Meyrick, 1921)

Synonyms
- Eporgastis maturata Meyrick, 1921

Species of moth

Dichomeris maturata is a moth in the family Gelechiidae. It was described by Edward Meyrick in 1921. It is found in Zimbabwe.

The wingspan is about 18 mm. The forewings are deep pinkish ochreous tinged with brownish, with a violet gloss, rather infuscated towards the costa. There is a rather oblique transverse bar of dark violet-fuscous suffusion in the disc slightly before the middle, parallel to the termen, and a cloudy transverse mark representing the second discal stigma. There is a slender streak of dark violet-fuscous suffusion along the termen, and some suffusion along the apical part of the costa. The hindwings are grey, paler towards the base.
