= Boadicea flavimacula =

Scientific classification
- Kingdom: Animalia
- Phylum: Arthropoda
- Class: Insecta
- Order: Lepidoptera
- Superfamily: Noctuoidea
- Family: Erebidae
- Subfamily: Arctiinae
- Genus: Boadicea
- Species: B. flavimacula

Binomial name
- Boadicea flavimacula Pinhey, 1968

Species of moth

Boadicea flavimacula is a moth of the subfamily Arctiinae first described by Pinhey in 1968. It is found in Zimbabwe.
