= Aethiopsestis austrina =

Scientific classification
- Kingdom: Animalia
- Phylum: Arthropoda
- Clade: Pancrustacea
- Class: Insecta
- Order: Lepidoptera
- Family: Drepanidae
- Genus: Aethiopsestis
- Species: A. austrina

Binomial name
- Aethiopsestis austrina Watson, 1965

Species of false owlet moth

Aethiopsestis austrina is a moth in the family Drepanidae. It was described by Watson in 1965. It is found in Zimbabwe and South Africa.

== Subspecies ==
- Aethiopsestis austrina austrina (Zimbabwe)
- Aethiopsestis austrina nebulosa Watson, 1965 (South Africa)
