= Dichomeris asteropis =

Scientific classification
- Kingdom: Animalia
- Phylum: Arthropoda
- Class: Insecta
- Order: Lepidoptera
- Family: Gelechiidae
- Genus: Dichomeris
- Species: D. asteropis

Binomial name
- Dichomeris asteropis Meyrick, 1921

Synonyms
- Trichotaphe asteropis

Species of moth

Dichomeris asteropis is a moth in the family Gelechiidae. It was described by Edward Meyrick in 1921. It is found in South Africa and Zimbabwe.

The wingspan is 20–21 mm. The forewings are pale greyish ochreous, sometimes faintly pinkish tinged, rather thinly irrorated (sprinkled) with dark grey. There is a cloudy grey dot midway between the first discal stigma and the base. The stigmata are cloudy, dark grey, each accompanied by a minute white dot, the plical somewhat before the first discal, the second discal transverse or double. There is a slightly oblique streak of grey suffusion from beneath the second discal stigma to the dorsum and a faint spot of pale suffusion on the costa at three-fourths, as well as some minute white marginal dots around the termen and tornus. The hindwings are grey.
