= Dichomeris chlorophracta =

Scientific classification
- Kingdom: Animalia
- Phylum: Arthropoda
- Class: Insecta
- Order: Lepidoptera
- Family: Gelechiidae
- Genus: Dichomeris
- Species: D. chlorophracta

Binomial name
- Dichomeris chlorophracta Meyrick, 1921

Synonyms
- Epicharta chlorophracta; Epicharta gnomonodes Meyrick, 1926

Species of moth

Dichomeris chlorophracta is a moth in the family Gelechiidae. It was described by Edward Meyrick in 1921. It is found in Zimbabwe.

The wingspan is 12-17 mm. The forewings are dark violet fuscous with a moderate whitish-ochreous costal streak at the base extending to dorsum, at three-fourths with a triangular expansion where a narrow transverse fascia runs to the dorsum before the tornus, continued around the apical portion of the costa and termen to the dorsal end of the fascia as a slender streak dotted with dark fuscous. The hindwings are light grey.
