= Phyllonorycter melhaniae =

Scientific classification
- Kingdom: Animalia
- Phylum: Arthropoda
- Class: Insecta
- Order: Lepidoptera
- Family: Gracillariidae
- Genus: Phyllonorycter
- Species: P. melhaniae

Binomial name
- Phyllonorycter melhaniae (Meyrick, 1912)

Synonyms
- Lithocolletis melhaniae Meyrick, 1912

Species of moth

Phyllonorycter melhaniae is a moth of the family Gracillariidae. It is known from Zimbabwe and South Africa.

The length of the forewings is 2.4–2.8 mm. Adults are on wing from mid-April to mid-May.

The larvae feed on Melhania velutina. They mine the leaves of their host plant.
