= Dichomeris microphanta =

Scientific classification
- Kingdom: Animalia
- Phylum: Arthropoda
- Class: Insecta
- Order: Lepidoptera
- Family: Gelechiidae
- Genus: Dichomeris
- Species: D. microphanta

Binomial name
- Dichomeris microphanta (Meyrick, 1921)

Synonyms
- Pachnistis microphanta Meyrick, 1921; Neopachnistis microphanta

Species of moth

Dichomeris microphanta is a moth in the family Gelechiidae, described by Edward Meyrick in 1921. It is found in Zimbabwe.

The wingspan is approximately 15 mm (0.59 in). The forewings are dark purplish fuscous, featuring small, undefined opposite spots of whitish-ochreous suffusion on the costa at three-fourths and the dorsum before the tornus, with three or four scattered scales between. The hindwings are rather dark grey.
