= Dichomeris xestobyrsa =

Scientific classification
- Kingdom: Animalia
- Phylum: Arthropoda
- Class: Insecta
- Order: Lepidoptera
- Family: Gelechiidae
- Genus: Dichomeris
- Species: D. xestobyrsa

Binomial name
- Dichomeris xestobyrsa Meyrick, 1921

Species of moth

Dichomeris xestobyrsa is a moth in the family Gelechiidae. It was described by Edward Meyrick in 1921. It is found in Zimbabwe.

The wingspan is about 15 mm. The forewings are grey with the bases of the scales whitish ochreous and with a black dot on the base of the costa with some whitish-ochreous suffusion beneath it. The stigmata are small, dark fuscous, the plical slightly before the first discal. The hindwings are grey.
