= Dichomeris finitima =

Scientific classification
- Kingdom: Animalia
- Phylum: Arthropoda
- Class: Insecta
- Order: Lepidoptera
- Family: Gelechiidae
- Genus: Dichomeris
- Species: D. finitima

Binomial name
- Dichomeris finitima (Meyrick, 1921)

Synonyms
- Pachnistis finitima Meyrick, 1921; Neopachnistis finitima

Species of moth

Dichomeris finitima is a moth in the family Gelechiidae. It was described by Edward Meyrick in 1921. It is found in Zimbabwe.

The wingspan is about 12 mm (0.47 in). The forewings are pale ochreous, towards the dorsum slightly grey speckled. The base of the costa is blackish. The stigmata is moderately large and blackish, the plical slightly before the first discal, the second discal somewhat transverse. There is an obtusely angulated pale shade from three-fourths of the costa to dorsum before the tornus, preceded by a fascia of sparse grey irroration (sprinkles) and the terminal area beyond it similarly irrorated. There is a marginal series of blackish elongate dots around the posterior part of the costa and termen. The hindwings are grey.
