= Eridachtha crossogramma =

Scientific classification
- Kingdom: Animalia
- Phylum: Arthropoda
- Class: Insecta
- Order: Lepidoptera
- Family: Lecithoceridae
- Genus: Eridachtha
- Species: E. crossogramma

Binomial name
- Eridachtha crossogramma (Meyrick, 1921)

Synonyms
- Corthyntis crossogramma Meyrick, 1921

Species of moth

Eridachtha crossogramma is a moth in the family Lecithoceridae. It was described by Edward Meyrick in 1921. It is found in Zimbabwe.

The wingspan is about 14 mm. The forewings are light yellow ochreous with the costa rather broadly suffused with fuscous except at the apex, darkest towards the base. The second discal stigma is fuscous. The hindwings are whitish ochreous.
