= Dichomeris aphanopa =

Scientific classification
- Kingdom: Animalia
- Phylum: Arthropoda
- Class: Insecta
- Order: Lepidoptera
- Family: Gelechiidae
- Genus: Dichomeris
- Species: D. aphanopa

Binomial name
- Dichomeris aphanopa Meyrick, 1921

Species of moth

Dichomeris aphanopa is a moth in the family Gelechiidae. It was described by Edward Meyrick in 1921. It is found in South Africa's North West and in Zimbabwe.

The wingspan is about 20 mm. The forewings are pale grey closely irrorated (sprinkled) with dark purple fuscous. The stigmata are cloudy, darker and hardly traceable, the plical beneath the first discal. There is a somewhat more distinct spot edged posteriorly with grey midway between the first discal and the base. The hindwings are rather dark grey.
