= Antigambra =

Scientific classification
- Kingdom: Animalia
- Phylum: Arthropoda
- Clade: Pancrustacea
- Class: Insecta
- Order: Lepidoptera
- Family: Tineidae
- Genus: Antigambra; Meyrick, 1927
- Species: A. amphitrocta

Binomial name
- Antigambra amphitrocta Meyrick, 1927

Genus of moths

Antigambra is a genus of moths belonging to the family Tineidae. It contains only one species, Antigambra amphitrocta, which is found in Zimbabwe and South Africa.
