= Miarotagmata =

Scientific classification
- Kingdom: Animalia
- Phylum: Arthropoda
- Clade: Pancrustacea
- Class: Insecta
- Order: Lepidoptera
- Family: Tineidae
- Subfamily: Myrmecozelinae
- Genus: Miarotagmata; Gozmány & Vári, 1973
- Species: M. penetrata

Binomial name
- Miarotagmata penetrata (Meyrick, 1912)

Synonyms
- Tinea penetrata Meyrick, 1912; Tinea myelopis Meyrick, 1927

Genus of moths

Miarotagmata is a genus of moths belonging to the family Tineidae. It contains only one species, Miarotagmata penetrata, which is found in South Africa and Zimbabwe.

This species has a wingspan of 11 mm.
