= Metarbelodes umtaliana =

Scientific classification
- Domain: Eukaryota
- Kingdom: Animalia
- Phylum: Arthropoda
- Class: Insecta
- Order: Lepidoptera
- Family: Cossidae
- Genus: Metarbelodes
- Species: M. umtaliana

Binomial name
- Metarbelodes umtaliana (Aurivillius, 1901)

Synonyms
- Metarbela umtaliana Aurivillius, 1901; Metarbelodes mutaliana Le Cerf, 1922

Species of moth

Metarbelodes umtaliana is a moth in the family Cossidae. It is found in Kenya and Zimbabwe.
