= Dichomeris zonaea =

Scientific classification
- Kingdom: Animalia
- Phylum: Arthropoda
- Class: Insecta
- Order: Lepidoptera
- Family: Gelechiidae
- Genus: Dichomeris
- Species: D. zonaea

Binomial name
- Dichomeris zonaea (Meyrick, 1921)

Synonyms
- Aphnogenes zonaea Meyrick, 1921

Species of moth

Dichomeris zonaea is a moth in the family Gelechiidae. It was described by Edward Meyrick in 1921. It is found in Zimbabwe.

The wingspan is 10–11 mm (0.39–0.43 in). The forewings are light ochreous, the costal third pale ochreous yellowish and the costal edge blackish at the base. There is a nearly straight suffused brownish transverse shade from two-thirds of the costa to the dorsum before the tornus, the terminal area beyond this is ochreous yellowish sprinkled with brownish. There are some brown marginal dots around the apex and termen. The hindwings are grey.
