= Coleophora molesta =

Scientific classification
- Kingdom: Animalia
- Phylum: Arthropoda
- Clade: Pancrustacea
- Class: Insecta
- Order: Lepidoptera
- Family: Coleophoridae
- Genus: Coleophora
- Species: C. molesta

Binomial name
- Coleophora molesta Meyrick, 1921

Species of moth

Coleophora molesta is a moth of the family Coleophoridae. It is found in Zimbabwe.
