= Dichomeris hylurga =

Scientific classification
- Kingdom: Animalia
- Phylum: Arthropoda
- Clade: Pancrustacea
- Class: Insecta
- Order: Lepidoptera
- Family: Gelechiidae
- Genus: Dichomeris
- Species: D. hylurga

Binomial name
- Dichomeris hylurga Meyrick, 1921

Species of moth

Dichomeris hylurga is a moth in the family Gelechiidae. It was described by Edward Meyrick in 1921. It is found in Zimbabwe.

The wingspan is 15–16 mm. The forewings are bronzy fuscous, more or less ochreous tinged towards the costa anteriorly and the base of the costal edge is dark fuscous. The stigmata are dark fuscous, the plical obliquely before the first discal. There is a moderate terminal fascia of rather darker fuscous suffusion. The hindwings are rather dark grey.
