= Audea tegulata =

Scientific classification
- Kingdom: Animalia
- Phylum: Arthropoda
- Class: Insecta
- Order: Lepidoptera
- Superfamily: Noctuoidea
- Family: Erebidae
- Genus: Audea
- Species: A. tegulata

Binomial name
- Audea tegulata Hampson, 1902

Synonyms
- Audea humeralis Hampson, 1902 (part)

Species of moth

Audea tegulata is a moth of the family Erebidae. It is found in Botswana, the Democratic Republic of Congo (East Kasai, Orientale, Katanga), Kenya, Malawi, Namibia, Nigeria, South Africa, Tanzania, Zambia and Zimbabwe.
