= Zobida avifex =

Scientific classification
- Domain: Eukaryota
- Kingdom: Animalia
- Phylum: Arthropoda
- Class: Insecta
- Order: Lepidoptera
- Superfamily: Noctuoidea
- Family: Erebidae
- Subfamily: Arctiinae
- Genus: Zobida
- Species: Z. avifex

Binomial name
- Zobida avifex Kühne, 2010

Species of moth

Zobida avifex is a moth of the subfamily Arctiinae first described by Lars Kühne in 2010. It is found in South Africa and Zimbabwe.
