= Coleophora phaeocentra =

Scientific classification
- Kingdom: Animalia
- Phylum: Arthropoda
- Class: Insecta
- Order: Lepidoptera
- Family: Coleophoridae
- Genus: Coleophora
- Species: C. phaeocentra

Binomial name
- Coleophora phaeocentra Meyrick, 1914

Species of moth

Coleophora phaeocentra is a moth of the family Coleophoridae. It is found in the country of Zimbabwe.
