= Aethiopsestis echinata =

Scientific classification
- Domain: Eukaryota
- Kingdom: Animalia
- Phylum: Arthropoda
- Class: Insecta
- Order: Lepidoptera
- Family: Drepanidae
- Genus: Aethiopsestis
- Species: A. echinata

Binomial name
- Aethiopsestis echinata Watson, 1965

Species of false owlet moth

Aethiopsestis echinata is a moth in the family Drepanidae. It was described by Watson in 1965. It is found in Zimbabwe.
