= Polysoma tanysphena =

Scientific classification
- Kingdom: Animalia
- Phylum: Arthropoda
- Class: Insecta
- Order: Lepidoptera
- Family: Gracillariidae
- Genus: Polysoma
- Species: P. tanysphena

Binomial name
- Polysoma tanysphena (Meyrick, 1928)

Synonyms
- Acrocercops tanysphena Meyrick, 1928

Species of moth

Polysoma tanysphena is a moth of the family Gracillariidae. It is known from Zimbabwe.
