= Scythris ochrantha =

Scientific classification
- Kingdom: Animalia
- Phylum: Arthropoda
- Class: Insecta
- Order: Lepidoptera
- Family: Scythrididae
- Genus: Scythris
- Species: S. ochrantha

Binomial name
- Scythris ochrantha Meyrick, 1909

Synonyms
- Scythris homoxantha Meyrick, 1921

Species of moth

Scythris ochrantha is a moth of the family Scythrididae. It was described by Edward Meyrick in 1909. It is found in South Africa (KwaZulu-Natal, Mpumalanga, Gauteng) and Zimbabwe.

The wingspan is about 17 mm. The forewings are yellow-ochreous and the hindwings are blackish-grey.
