= Dichomeris homaloxesta =

Scientific classification
- Kingdom: Animalia
- Phylum: Arthropoda
- Class: Insecta
- Order: Lepidoptera
- Family: Gelechiidae
- Genus: Dichomeris
- Species: D. homaloxesta

Binomial name
- Dichomeris homaloxesta (Meyrick, 1921)

Synonyms
- Trichotaphe homaloxesta Meyrick, 1921

Species of moth

Dichomeris homaloxesta is a moth in the family Gelechiidae. It was described by Edward Meyrick in 1921. It is found in Zimbabwe.

The wingspan is about 14 mm. The forewings are grey with a faint yellowish tinge and violet reflections. The extreme costal edge is whitish from about one-fifth to three-fifths. The hindwings are rather dark grey.
