= Dichomeris eustacta =

Scientific classification
- Kingdom: Animalia
- Phylum: Arthropoda
- Class: Insecta
- Order: Lepidoptera
- Family: Gelechiidae
- Genus: Dichomeris
- Species: D. eustacta

Binomial name
- Dichomeris eustacta Meyrick, 1921

Species of moth

Dichomeris eustacta is a moth in the family Gelechiidae. It was described by Edward Meyrick in 1921. It is found in Zimbabwe.

The wingspan is about 11 mm. The forewings are pale yellow ochreous, irregularly spotted and marbled with grey, including a larger spot on the costa beyond the middle, and an elongate spot along the dorsum before the middle. There is a blackish streak on the basal portion of the costa, and four small elongate blackish spots between this and the postmedian spot. The stigmata is blackish, the plical rather obliquely before the first discal and there are three blackish dots on the termen, surrounded with grey irroration. The hindwings are grey.
