= Scythris patiens =

Scientific classification
- Kingdom: Animalia
- Phylum: Arthropoda
- Class: Insecta
- Order: Lepidoptera
- Family: Scythrididae
- Genus: Scythris
- Species: S. patiens

Binomial name
- Scythris patiens Meyrick, 1921

Species of moth

Scythris patiens is a moth of the family Scythrididae. It was described by Edward Meyrick in 1921. It is found in Zimbabwe.

The wingspan is 15–17 mm. The forewings are light greyish-ochreous and the hindwings are dark grey.
