= Dichomeris autophanta =

Scientific classification
- Kingdom: Animalia
- Phylum: Arthropoda
- Class: Insecta
- Order: Lepidoptera
- Family: Gelechiidae
- Genus: Dichomeris
- Species: D. autophanta

Binomial name
- Dichomeris autophanta (Meyrick, 1921)

Synonyms
- Pachnistis autophanta Meyrick, 1921; Neopachnistis autophanta

Species of moth

Dichomeris autophanta is a moth in the family Gelechiidae. It was described by Edward Meyrick in 1921, and is found in Zimbabwe.

The wingspan is about 14 mm. The forewings are dark purplish fuscous with small cloudy pale ochreous opposite spots on the costa at three-fourths and the dorsum before the tornus. The hindwings are grey.
