= Frisilia forficatella =

Scientific classification
- Kingdom: Animalia
- Phylum: Arthropoda
- Clade: Pancrustacea
- Class: Insecta
- Order: Lepidoptera
- Family: Lecithoceridae
- Genus: Frisilia
- Species: F. forficatella

Binomial name
- Frisilia forficatella Park, 2005

Species of moth

Frisilia forficatella is a moth in the family Lecithoceridae. It was described by Kyu-Tek Park in 2005. It is found in Thailand.

The wingspan is 15–15.5 mm.
