= Dichomeris torrescens =

Scientific classification
- Kingdom: Animalia
- Phylum: Arthropoda
- Class: Insecta
- Order: Lepidoptera
- Family: Gelechiidae
- Genus: Dichomeris
- Species: D. torrescens

Binomial name
- Dichomeris torrescens (Meyrick, 1921)

Synonyms
- Eporgastis torrescens Meyrick, 1921

Species of moth

Dichomeris torrescens is a moth in the family Gelechiidae. It was described by Edward Meyrick in 1921. It is found in Zimbabwe.

The wingspan is about 16 mm. The forewings are ferruginous irregularly mixed with deep ferruginous, with violet iridescence. There is an angulated light ferruginous-ochreous shade from three-fourths of the costa to the dorsum before the tornus. The hindwings are light ochreous slightly tinged with ferruginous posteriorly.
