= Dichomeris syngrapta =

Scientific classification
- Kingdom: Animalia
- Phylum: Arthropoda
- Class: Insecta
- Order: Lepidoptera
- Family: Gelechiidae
- Genus: Dichomeris
- Species: D. syngrapta

Binomial name
- Dichomeris syngrapta (Meyrick, 1921)

Synonyms
- Trichotaphe syngrapta Meyrick, 1921; Eporgastis syngrapta

Species of moth

Dichomeris syngrapta is a moth in the family Gelechiidae. It was described by Edward Meyrick in 1921. It is found in Zimbabwe.

The wingspan is about 17 mm. The forewings are pale ochreous, the veins are tinged with ferruginous and the base of the costal edge is fuscous. There is a streak of reddish-fuscous suffusion mixed with darker along the termen and the terminal edge is ochreous whitish. The hindwings are grey.
