= Dichomeris attenta =

Scientific classification
- Kingdom: Animalia
- Phylum: Arthropoda
- Class: Insecta
- Order: Lepidoptera
- Family: Gelechiidae
- Genus: Dichomeris
- Species: D. attenta

Binomial name
- Dichomeris attenta Meyrick, 1921

Species of moth

Dichomeris attenta is a moth in the family Gelechiidae. It was described by Edward Meyrick in 1921. It is found in Zimbabwe.

The wingspan is about 11 mm. The forewings are pale ochreous suffusedly speckled with grey and with the anterior two-thirds of the costa rather broadly suffused with ochreous whitish. The costal edge is dark fuscous towards the base and the stigmata are dark fuscous, the plical obliquely beyond the first discal. There is a cloudy additional dot midway between the plical and the base, as well as an acutely angulated obscure ferruginous-brownish transverse line just beyond the second discal and some cloudy marginal dots of ferruginous-brownish irroration (speckles) around the apex, and some dark fuscous irroration towards the termen beneath the apex. The hindwings are grey.
