= Dichomeris pladarota =

Scientific classification
- Kingdom: Animalia
- Phylum: Arthropoda
- Class: Insecta
- Order: Lepidoptera
- Family: Gelechiidae
- Genus: Dichomeris
- Species: D. pladarota

Binomial name
- Dichomeris pladarota Meyrick, 1921

Species of moth

Dichomeris pladarota is a moth in the family Gelechiidae. It was described by Edward Meyrick in 1921. It is found in Zimbabwe.

The wingspan is about 16 mm. The forewings are pale ochreous, suffused with pale grey from the base to the subterminal line except towards the anterior half of the costa. The terminal area is suffusedly sprinkled with grey and the costal edge is black near the base. The stigmata are moderate, blackish, the plical rather obliquely before the first discal, the second discal somewhat transverse. There is an indistinct rather irregular slightly bent pale ochreous subterminal line at four-fifths and some indistinct fuscous marginal dots around the posterior part of the costa and termen, united into a line around apex. The hindwings are rather dark grey.
