= Scythris distactica =

Scientific classification
- Kingdom: Animalia
- Phylum: Arthropoda
- Class: Insecta
- Order: Lepidoptera
- Family: Scythrididae
- Genus: Scythris
- Species: S. distactica

Binomial name
- Scythris distactica Meyrick, 1921

Species of moth

Scythris distactica is a moth of the family Scythrididae. It was described by Edward Meyrick in 1921. It is found in Namibia and Zimbabwe.

The wingspan is about 12 mm. The forewings are light grey tinged with whitish and with a faint round cloudy somewhat darker spot in the disc at three-fourths. The hindwings are rather dark grey.
