= Erismatica =

Scientific classification
- Kingdom: Animalia
- Phylum: Arthropoda
- Class: Insecta
- Order: Lepidoptera
- Family: Sesiidae
- Genus: Erismatica; Meyrick, 1933
- Species: E. erythropis

Binomial name
- Erismatica erythropis Meyrick, 1933

Genus of moths

Erismatica is a genus of moths in the family Sesiidae. Erismatica contains a single species, Erismatica erythropis, which can be found in Zimbabwe.
