= Parallactis ochrobyrsa =

Scientific classification
- Domain: Eukaryota
- Kingdom: Animalia
- Phylum: Arthropoda
- Class: Insecta
- Order: Lepidoptera
- Family: Autostichidae
- Genus: Parallactis
- Species: P. ochrobyrsa

Binomial name
- Parallactis ochrobyrsa (Meyrick, 1921)

Synonyms
- Brachmia ochrobyrsa Meyrick, 1921

Species of moth

Parallactis ochrobyrsa is a moth in the family Autostichidae. It was described by Edward Meyrick in 1921. It is found in Zimbabwe.

The wingspan is about 17 mm. The forewings are yellow ochreous and the hindwings are grey.
