= Dichomeris pseudodeltaspis =

Scientific classification
- Kingdom: Animalia
- Phylum: Arthropoda
- Class: Insecta
- Order: Lepidoptera
- Family: Gelechiidae
- Genus: Dichomeris
- Species: D. pseudodeltaspis

Binomial name
- Dichomeris pseudodeltaspis Ponomarenko & Ueda, 2004

Species of moth

Dichomeris pseudodeltaspis is a moth in the family Gelechiidae. It was described by Ponomarenko and Ueda in 2004. It is found in Thailand.

The wingspan is 18.5–20 mm (0.73–0.79 in).

== Etymology ==
The species name is derived from Greek pseud (meaning false) and the name of the similar species Dichomeris deltaspis.
