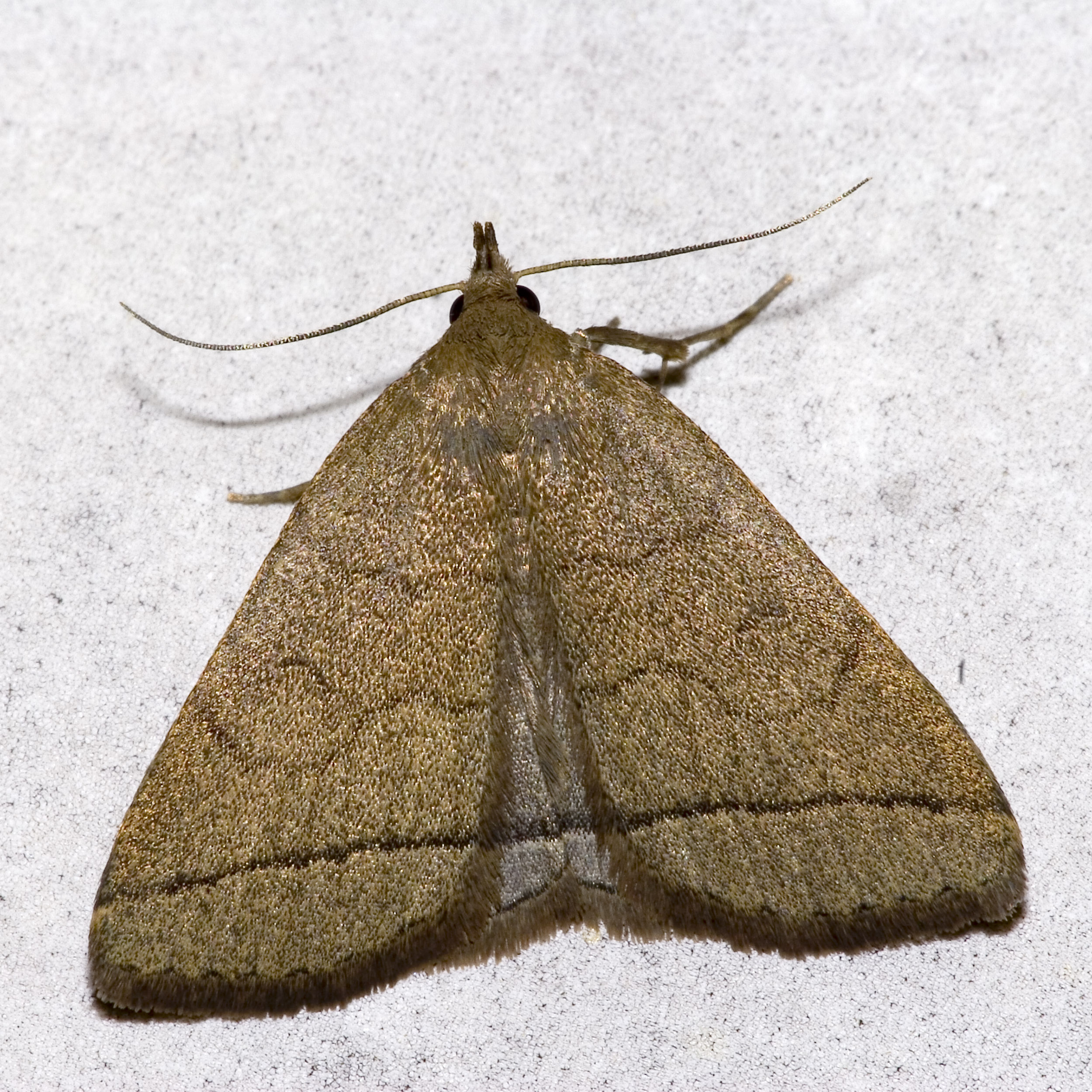

Scientific classification
- Kingdom: Animalia
- Phylum: Arthropoda
- Class: Insecta
- Order: Lepidoptera
- Superfamily: Noctuoidea
- Family: Erebidae
- Genus: Zanclognatha
- Species: Z. tarsipennalis

Binomial name
- Zanclognatha tarsipennalis (Treitschke, 1835)

Synonyms
- Herminia tarsipennalis Treitschke, 1835

= Zanclognatha tarsipennalis =

Fan-foot

Species of moth

Zanclognatha tarsipennalis, the fan-foot, is a species of litter moth of the family Erebidae. It is found in Europe and east across the Palearctic to Siberia, Amur, Ussuri, Japan, Taiwan, Korea and China.

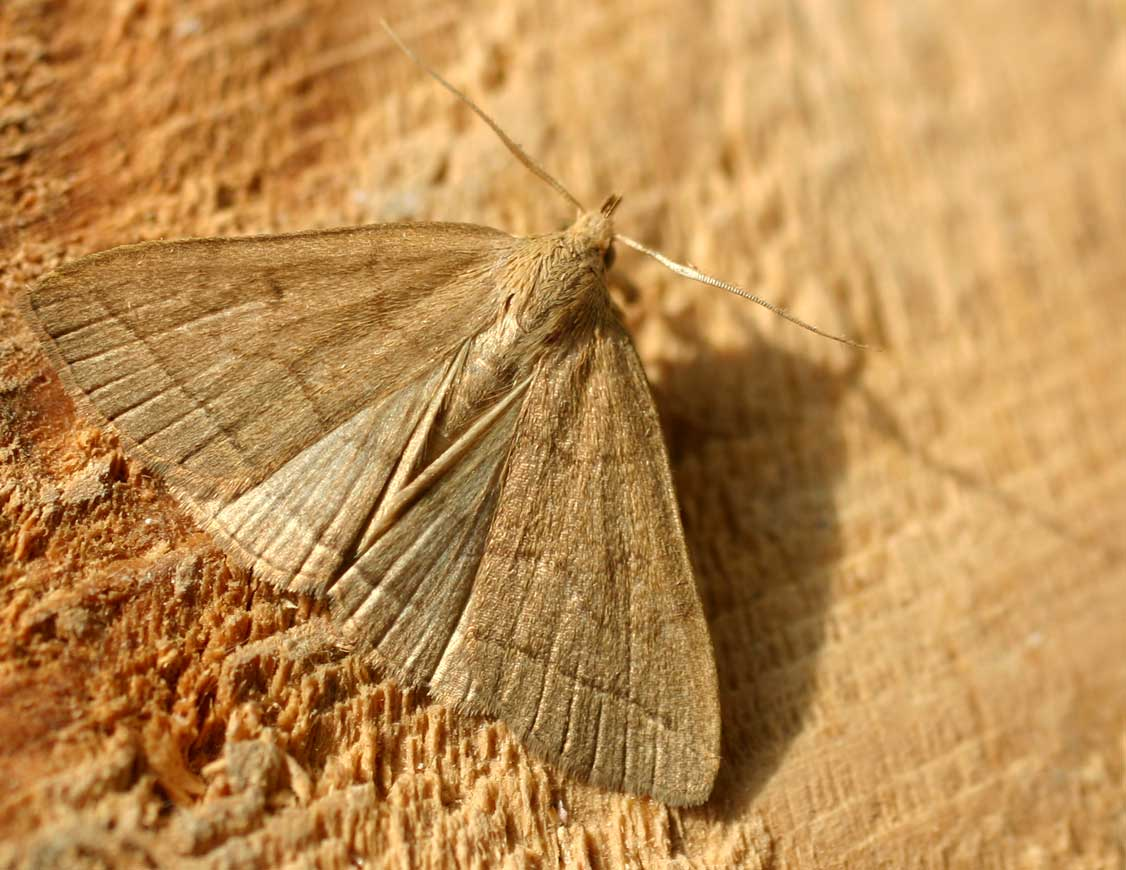

== Technical description and variation ==
The length of the forewings is 13–16 millimetres (0.51–0.63 in). Forewing narrower and greyer, less purple, than Polypogon lunalis Scopoli, 1763, sometimes with a yellowish flush; the inner and outer lines nearer together; the subterminal line simple, brown without any shade before, slightly concave outwards; the cell lunule obscurer; hindwing paler grey, the subterminal dark, strongly white-edged externally; the ab. bidentalis Hein. is paler grey, with a faint yellowish or rufous flush, the sub-terminal line of hindwing hardly angled. Larva dull grey; the dorsal line greyish black; tubercles black ringed with yellowish green; spiracles black; head black brown.

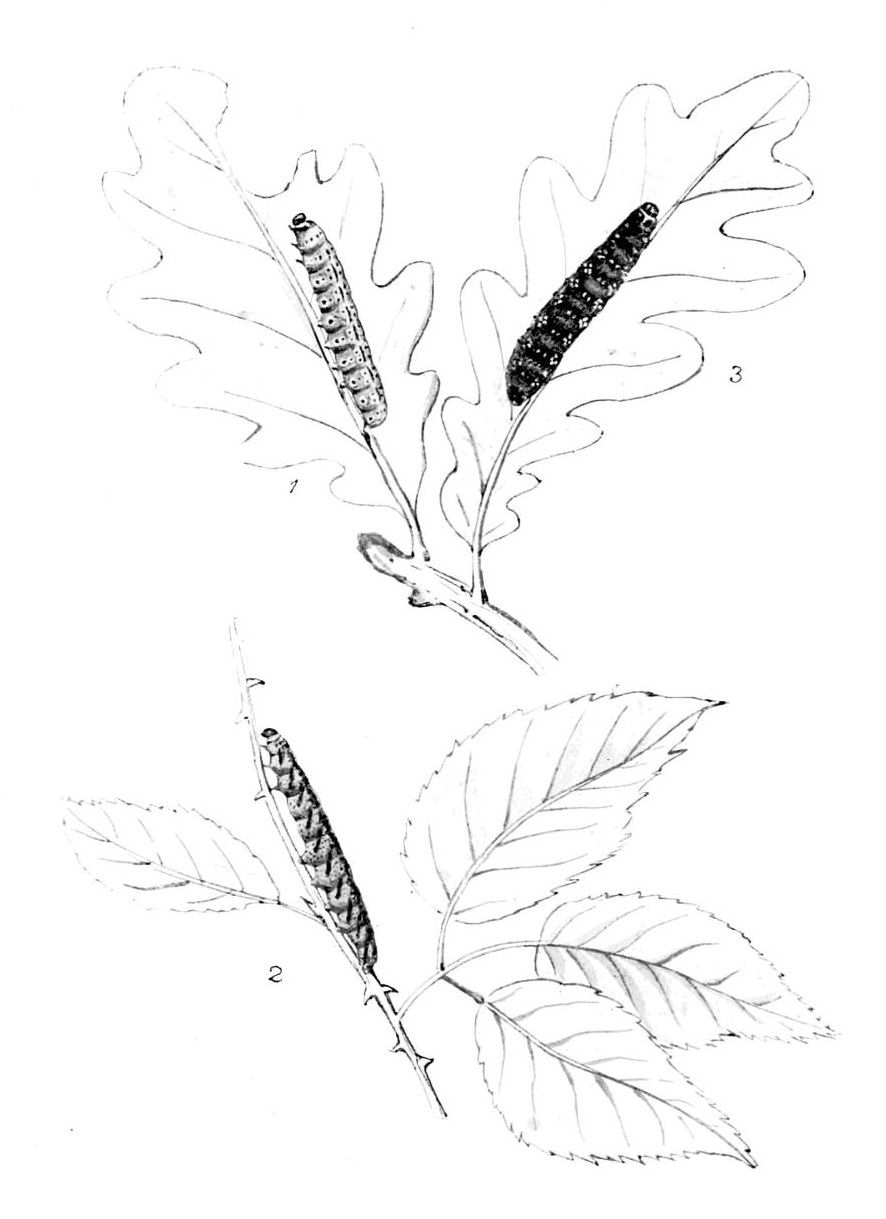
Larva (figure 2)

== Biology ==
The moth flies from May to October depending on the location.

The larvae feed on fallen leaves of European beech, oak and Rubus.
