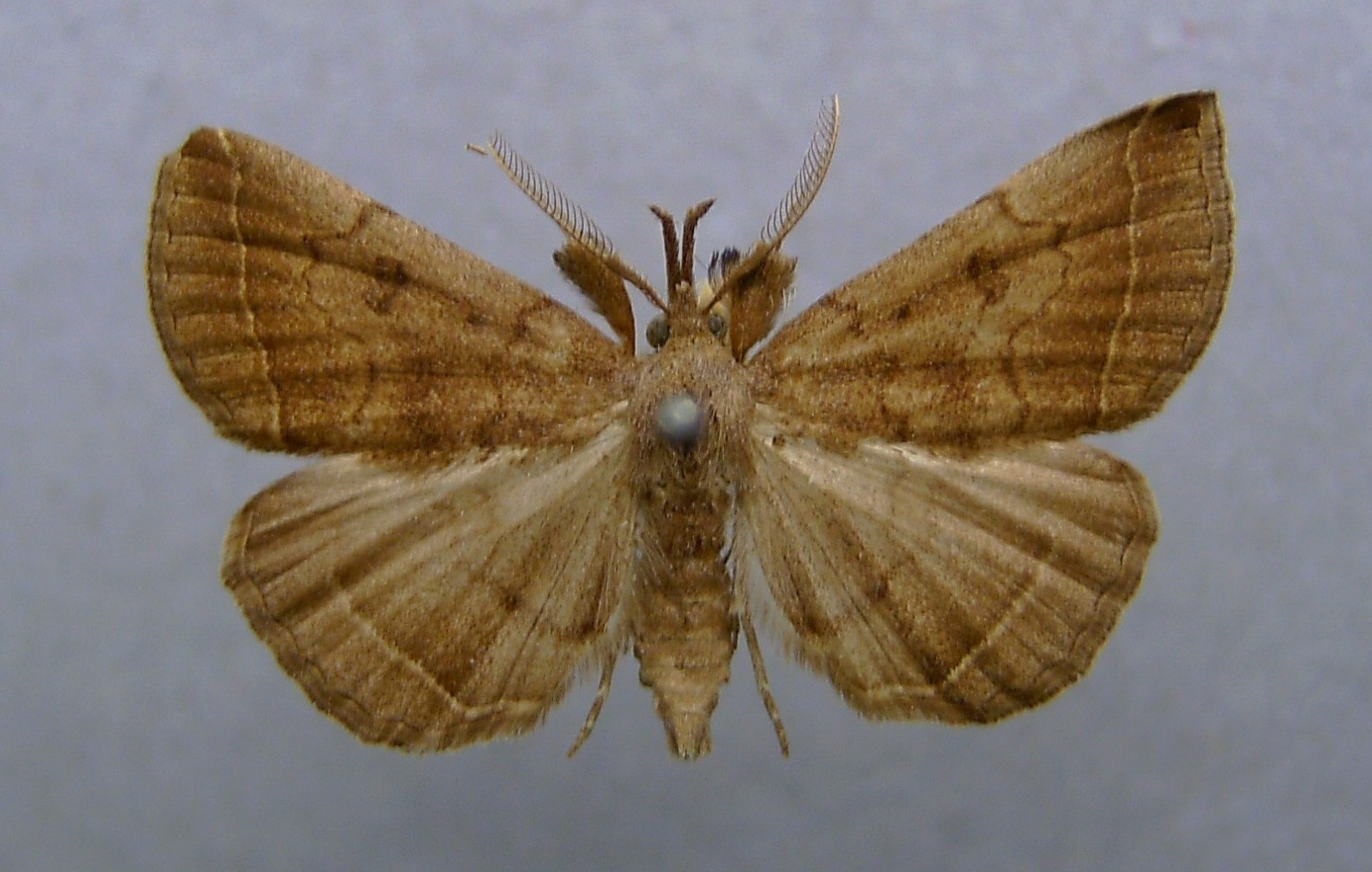
- Pechipogo plumigeralis

Scientific classification
- Kingdom: Animalia
- Phylum: Arthropoda
- Clade: Pancrustacea
- Class: Insecta
- Order: Lepidoptera
- Superfamily: Noctuoidea
- Family: Erebidae
- Subfamily: Herminiinae
- Genus: Pechipogo; Hübner, 1825

Synonyms
- Pechipogon Stephens, 1834

= Pechipogo =

Genus of moths

Pechipogo is a genus of moths of the family Erebidae. The genus was erected by Jacob Hübner in 1825.

Lepidoptera and Some Other Life Forms and Butterflies and Moths of the World consider this name to be a synonym of Polypogon.

== Species ==
- Pechipogo plumigeralis Hübner, [1825]
- Pechipogo simplicicornis Zerny, 1935
- Pechipogo strigilata Linnaeus, 1758
