= Mesoplectra =

Scientific classification
- Domain: Eukaryota
- Kingdom: Animalia
- Phylum: Arthropoda
- Class: Insecta
- Order: Lepidoptera
- Superfamily: Noctuoidea
- Family: Erebidae
- Subfamily: Herminiinae
- Genus: Mesoplectra; Butler, 1879

Genus of moths

Mesoplectra was a genus of moths of the family Noctuidae first described by Arthur Gardiner Butler in 1879.

It is considered by The Global Lepidoptera Names Index and Butterflies and Moths of the World to be a synonym of Polypogon. It is considered by Lepidoptera and Some Other Life Forms to be a synonym of Zanclognatha.
