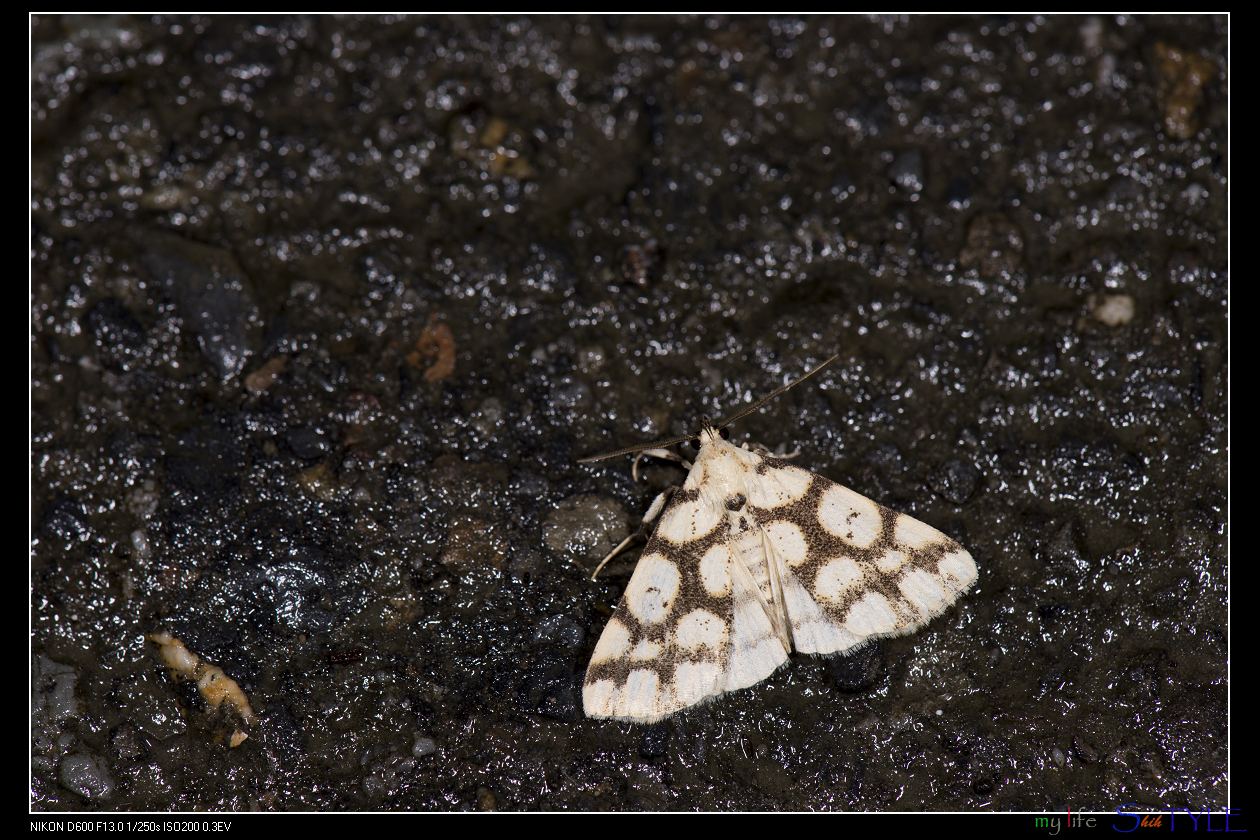
- Adrapsoides reticulatis

Scientific classification
- Domain: Eukaryota
- Kingdom: Animalia
- Phylum: Arthropoda
- Class: Insecta
- Order: Lepidoptera
- Superfamily: Noctuoidea
- Family: Erebidae
- Subfamily: Herminiinae
- Genus: Adrapsoides; Matsumura, 1925

= Adrapsoides =

Genus of moths

Adrapsoides was a genus of moths of the family Noctuidae described by Shōnen Matsumura in 1925. It is considered by The Global Lepidoptera Names Index and Butterflies and Moths of the World to be a synonym of Polypogon. It is considered by Lepidoptera and Some Other Life Forms to be a synonym of Zanclognatha.
