= Megachyta =

Scientific classification
- Kingdom: Animalia
- Phylum: Arthropoda
- Class: Insecta
- Order: Lepidoptera
- Superfamily: Noctuoidea
- Family: Erebidae
- Subfamily: Herminiinae
- Genus: Megachyta; Grote, 1873

Genus of moths

Megachyta was a genus of moths of the family Noctuidae first described by Augustus Radcliffe Grote in 1873.

It is considered by The Global Lepidoptera Names Index and Butterflies and Moths of the World to be a synonym of Polypogon. It is considered by Lepidoptera and Some Other Life Forms to be a synonym of Zanclognatha.
