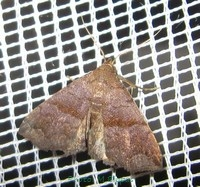

Scientific classification
- Domain: Eukaryota
- Kingdom: Animalia
- Phylum: Arthropoda
- Class: Insecta
- Order: Lepidoptera
- Superfamily: Noctuoidea
- Family: Erebidae
- Subfamily: Herminiinae
- Genus: Polypogon; Schrank, 1802

Synonyms
- Adrapsoides Matsumura, 1925; Anitha Walker, [1866]; Cleptomita Grote, 1873; Gryphopogon Beck, 1996; Hipoepa Walker, [1859]; Megachita Grote, 1873; Megachyta Grote, 1873; Mesoplectra Butler, 1879; Microphta Berio, 1989; Pechipogo Hübner, [1825]; Pechypogon Agassiz, [1847]; Pityolita Grote, 1873; Polypogon Schrank, 1802; Strigina Savigny, 1816; Zanclognatha Lederer, 1857

= Polypogon (moth) =

Genus of moths

Polypogon is a genus of litter moths of the family Erebidae. The genus was described by Franz von Paula Schrank in 1802. In the past, Zanclognatha species were included in Polypogon.

== Species ==
- Polypogon caffrarium (Möschler, 1883)
- Polypogon fractale (Guenée, 1854)
- Polypogon fractalis (Guenée, 1854)
- Polypogon gryphalis (Herrich-Schäffer, 1851)
- Polypogon lunalis (Scopoli, 1763)
- Polypogon malhama (Hacker, 2011)
- Polypogon plumigeralis (Hübner, 1825)
- Polypogon saldaitis (Hacker, 2011)
- Polypogon strigilatus (Linnaeus, 1758) – common fan-foot
- Polypogon tentacularia (Linnaeus, 1758)
- Polypogon yemenitica (Hacker, 2011)
- Polypogon zammodia (Bethune-Baker, 1911)
- Polypogon zelleralis (Wocke, 1850)
