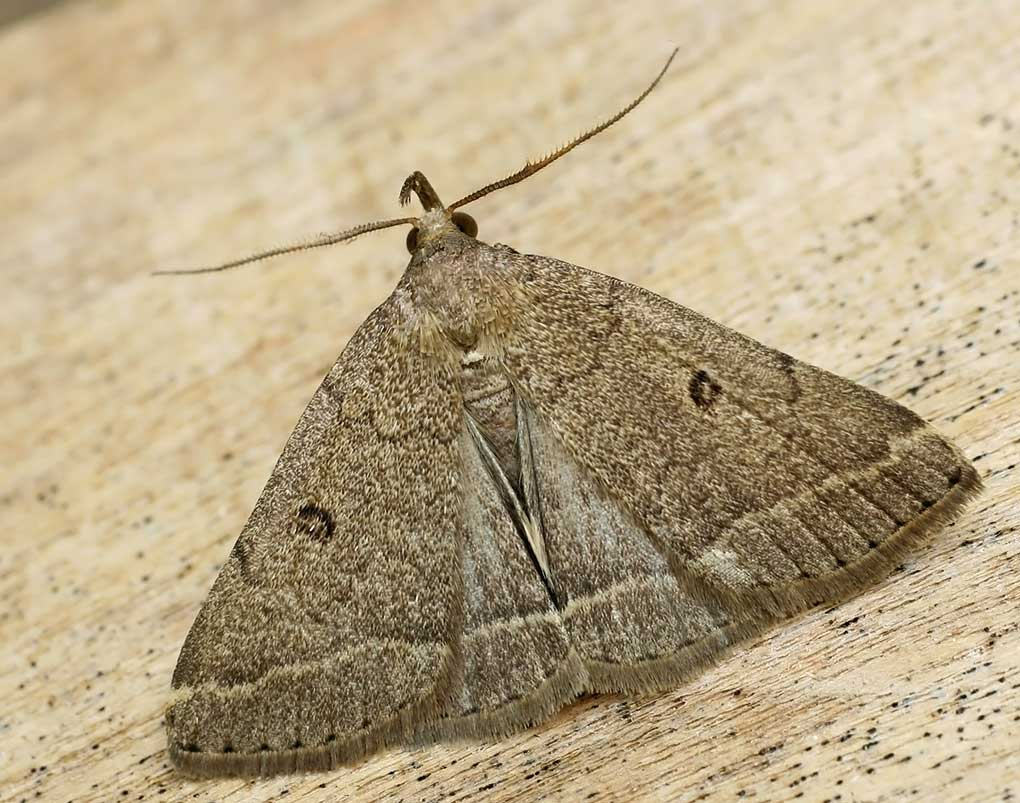

Scientific classification
- Kingdom: Animalia
- Phylum: Arthropoda
- Class: Insecta
- Order: Lepidoptera
- Superfamily: Noctuoidea
- Family: Erebidae
- Genus: Zanclognatha
- Species: Z. zelleralis

Binomial name
- Zanclognatha zelleralis (Wocke, 1850)

= Zanclognatha zelleralis =

Dusky fan-foot

Species of moth

Zanclognatha zelleralis, the dusky fan-foot, is a species of moth of the family Noctuidae. It was described by Maximilian Ferdinand Wocke in 1850. It is found in central and southern Europe.

== Technical description and variation ==
as Z. tarsicristalis H.-Sch. [synonym] Forewing greyer, less purple, than tarsiplumalis the subterminal better marked, bordered with dark on both sides; the outer line more dentate; the cell lunule ocellate; the ab. zelleralis Wocke [synonym] from Silesia, has narrower wings with fainter markings. Larva greyish yellow, finely dusted with dark; dorsal line reddish, swollen laterally at the hinder edge of the segments; the reddish subdorsal shewing on the front halves of each segment; the colour varies from grey to brown with the green of the inside showing through.

The wingspan is 31–36 millimetres (1.2–1.4 in).

== Biology ==
The moth flies from June to July depending on the location.

The larvae feed on fallen leaves.
