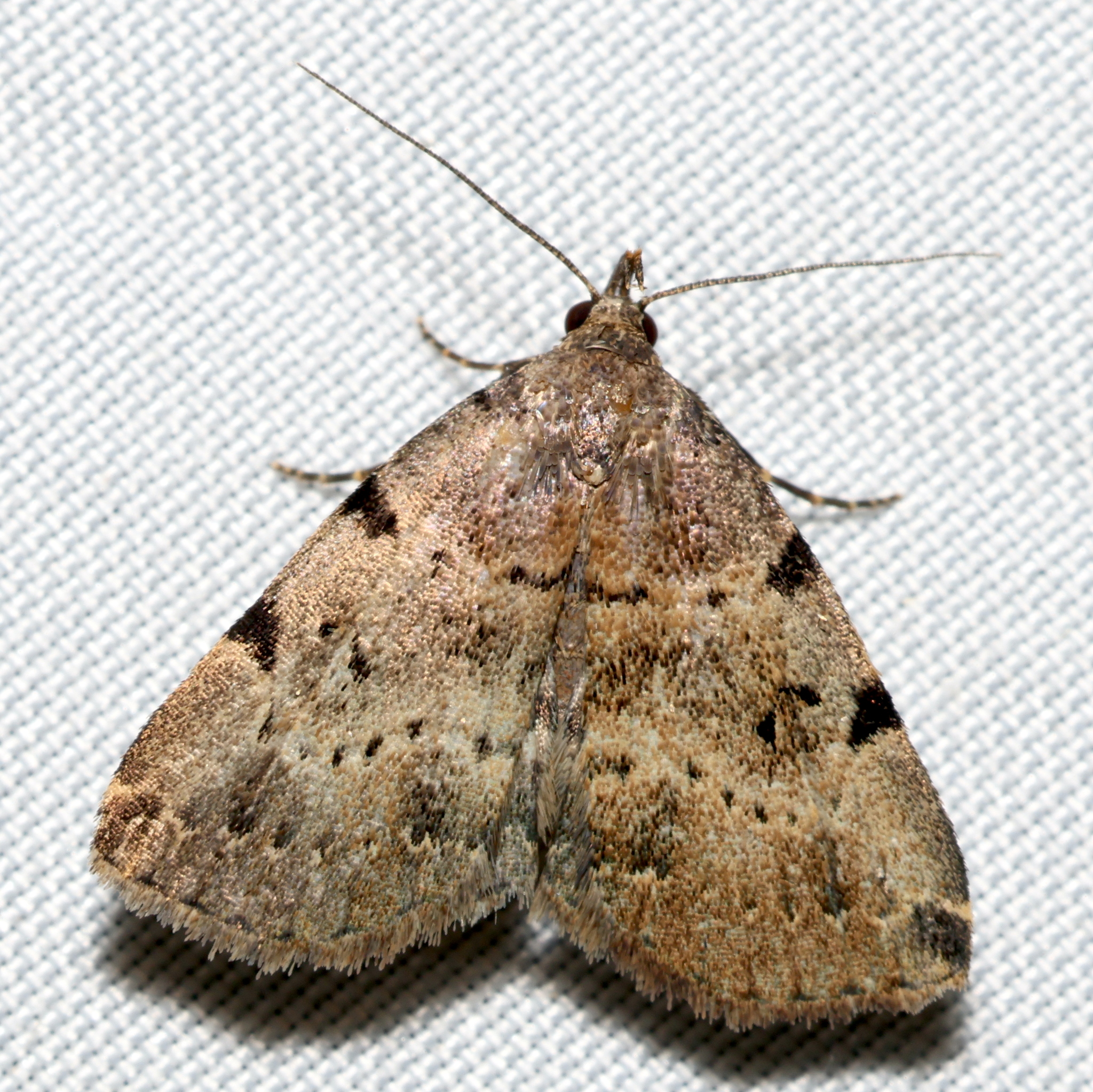

Scientific classification
- Kingdom: Animalia
- Phylum: Arthropoda
- Class: Insecta
- Order: Lepidoptera
- Superfamily: Noctuoidea
- Family: Erebidae
- Genus: Zanclognatha
- Species: Z. lituralis

Binomial name
- Zanclognatha lituralis (Hübner, 1818)

Synonyms
- Polypogon lituralis Hübner, 1818

= Zanclognatha lituralis =

Species of moth

Zanclognatha lituralis, the lettered zanclognatha, is a litter moth of the family Erebidae. It was described by Jacob Hübner in 1818. It is found from in North America from Wisconsin to Nova Scotia, and south to Florida and Texas.

The wingspan is about 21 millimetres (0.83 in). Adults are on wing from May to August. There is one generation in the north and at least a partial second generation from Ohio and Connecticut southward.

The larvae feed on detritus, including dead leaves.
