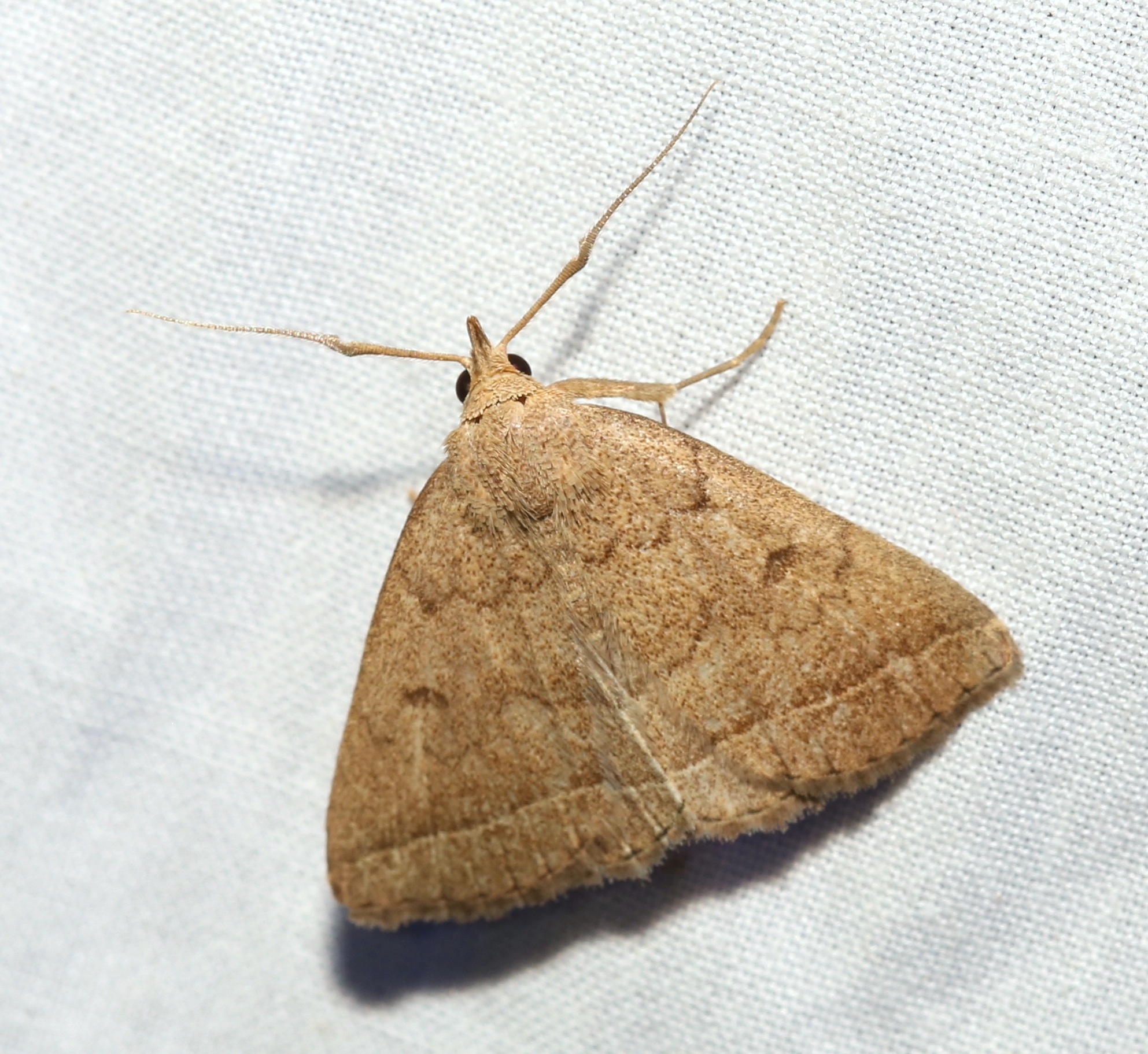

Scientific classification
- Kingdom: Animalia
- Phylum: Arthropoda
- Class: Insecta
- Order: Lepidoptera
- Superfamily: Noctuoidea
- Family: Erebidae
- Genus: Zanclognatha
- Species: Z. jacchusalis

Binomial name
- Zanclognatha jacchusalis (Walker, 1859)

Synonyms
- Zanclognatha ochreipennis (Grote, 1872); Polypogon ochreipennis Grote, 1872; Polypogon jacchusalis Walker, 1859; Polypogon lutalba J. B. Smith, 1906

= Zanclognatha jacchusalis =

Species of moth

Zanclognatha jacchusalis, the wavy-lined zanclognatha, is a litter moth of the family Erebidae. It was described by Francis Walker in 1859. It is found in the US from Wisconsin to Maine, south to Georgia and Louisiana.

The wingspan is 28–31 millimetres (1.1–1.2 in). Adults are on wing from April to September. Normally, there is one generation per year. There are two generations in Missouri.

Larvae probably feed on detritus. Larvae have been reared on dead oak leaves.

== Subspecies ==
- Zanclognatha jacchusalis jacchusalis
- Zanclognatha jacchusalis bryanti Barnes, 1928
- Zanclognatha jacchusalis lutalba (Smith, 1906)
