= Dichomeris deltaspis =

Scientific classification
- Kingdom: Animalia
- Phylum: Arthropoda
- Class: Insecta
- Order: Lepidoptera
- Family: Gelechiidae
- Genus: Dichomeris
- Species: D. deltaspis

Binomial name
- Dichomeris deltaspis (Meyrick, 1905)

Synonyms
- Ypsolophus deltaspis Meyrick, 1905

Species of moth

Dichomeris deltaspis is a moth in the family Gelechiidae. It was described by Edward Meyrick in 1905. It is found in Sri Lanka. The Global Lepidoptera Names Index has this species as a synonym of Dichomeris bisignella.

The wingspan is about 21 mm (0.83 in). The forewings are greyish ochreous, strigulated with ferruginous brown and with a small blackish spot on the base of the costa and a dot beneath the costa near the base. The costal edge is pale rosy anteriorly, strigulated with blackish. There is a triangular blackish spot on the costa before the middle, reaching one-third of the way across the wing. There is a transverse streak of ferruginous-brown suffusion from the dorsum before one-fourth, reaching more than halfway across the wing. The discal stigmata is small, ferruginous brown, near together. There is also an undefined fascia of ferruginous-brown suffusion at about three-fourths, terminating on the costa in a darker spot mixed with blackish. The hindwings are rather dark fuscous.
