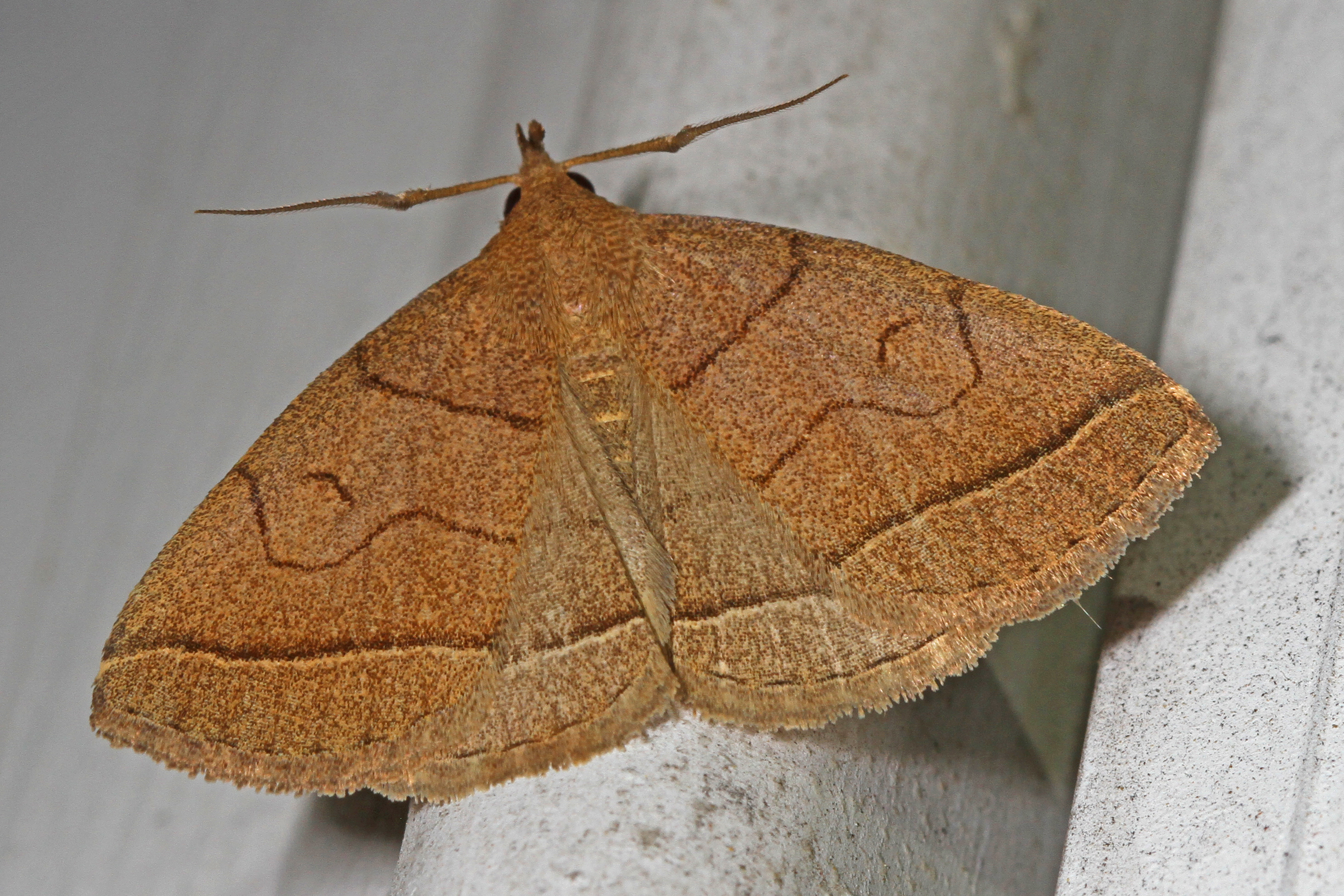

Scientific classification
- Domain: Eukaryota
- Kingdom: Animalia
- Phylum: Arthropoda
- Class: Insecta
- Order: Lepidoptera
- Superfamily: Noctuoidea
- Family: Erebidae
- Genus: Zanclognatha
- Species: Z. obscuripennis

Binomial name
- Zanclognatha obscuripennis (Grote, 1872)

= Zanclognatha obscuripennis =

Species of moth

Zanclognatha obscuripennis, the dark zanclognatha, is a litter moth of the family Erebidae. It was described by Augustus Radcliffe Grote in 1872. It is found in North America from Missouri to Quebec, south to Florida and Texas.

The wingspan is 22–32 millimetres (0.87–1.26 in). Adults are on wing from April to June. There are two generations in most of its range. There are continuous broods in Florida.

The larvae feed on detritus, including dead leaves.
