= Zanclognatha atrilineella =

Scientific classification
- Domain: Eukaryota
- Kingdom: Animalia
- Phylum: Arthropoda
- Class: Insecta
- Order: Lepidoptera
- Superfamily: Noctuoidea
- Family: Erebidae
- Genus: Zanclognatha
- Species: Z. atrilineella

Binomial name
- Zanclognatha atrilineella (Grote, 1873)

Synonyms
- Polypogon atrilineella Grote, 1873

Species of moth

Zanclognatha atrilineella is a litter moth of the family Erebidae. It was described by Augustus Radcliffe Grote in 1873. It is found in the southeastern United States.

The wingspan is about 23 millimetres (0.91 in).
