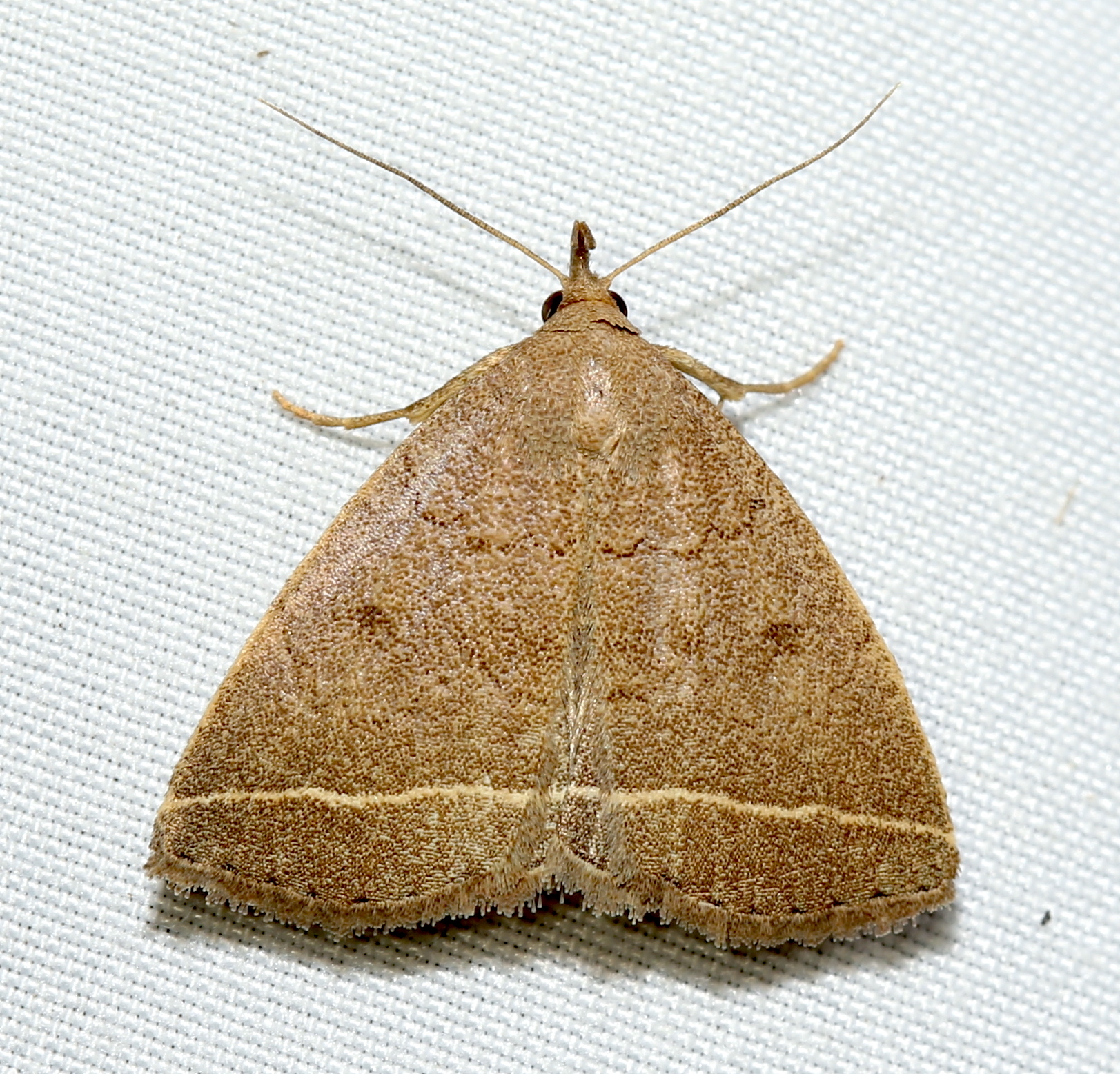

Scientific classification
- Kingdom: Animalia
- Phylum: Arthropoda
- Class: Insecta
- Order: Lepidoptera
- Superfamily: Noctuoidea
- Family: Erebidae
- Genus: Zanclognatha
- Species: Z. marcidilinea

Binomial name
- Zanclognatha marcidilinea (Walker, 1859)

Synonyms
- Polypogon marcidilinea Walker, 1859

= Zanclognatha marcidilinea =

Species of moth

Zanclognatha marcidilinea, the yellowish zanclognatha, is a litter moth of the family Erebidae. It was described by Francis Walker in 1859. It is found in North America from Nova Scotia to Missouri, south to Florida and Arkansas.

The wingspan is about 28 millimetres (1.1 in). Adults are on wing from April to July.

Larvae probably feed on dead leaves, including cottonwood leaves.
