= Zanclognatha bryanti =

Scientific classification
- Domain: Eukaryota
- Kingdom: Animalia
- Phylum: Arthropoda
- Class: Insecta
- Order: Lepidoptera
- Superfamily: Noctuoidea
- Family: Erebidae
- Genus: Zanclognatha
- Species: Z. bryanti

Binomial name
- Zanclognatha bryanti Barnes, 1928

Synonyms
- Polypogon bryanti (Barnes, 1928)

Species of moth

Zanclognatha jacchusalis bryanti is a moth of the family Noctuidae. It was described by William Barnes in 1928. It is found from British Columbia to Oregon.

== Taxonomy ==
The classification of this species was unclear for a long time. Some authors considered it a subspecies of Zanclognatha ochreipennis. It has also been treated as a synonym of Zanclognatha jacchusalis or a subspecies of Zanclognatha lutalba.
