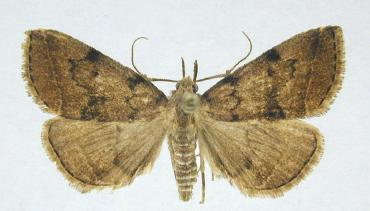
- Male
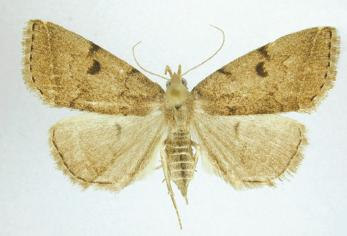
- Female

Scientific classification
- Domain: Eukaryota
- Kingdom: Animalia
- Phylum: Arthropoda
- Class: Insecta
- Order: Lepidoptera
- Superfamily: Noctuoidea
- Family: Erebidae
- Genus: Zanclognatha
- Species: Z. dentata

Binomial name
- Zanclognatha dentata Wagner & McCabe, 2011

= Zanclognatha dentata =

Species of moth

Zanclognatha dentata, the coastal plain zanclognatha, is a litter moth of the family Erebidae. The species was first described by David L. Wagner and Timothy L. McCabe in 2011. It is found in North America from Ontario to Nova Scotia, south through the Great Lake states and in the Appalachians to northern Georgia. One specimen from a sandhills area in central South Carolina also appears to represent Z. dentata.

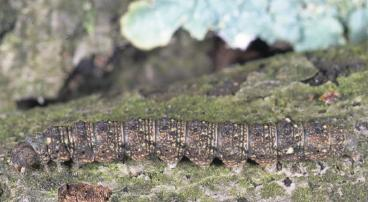
Larva

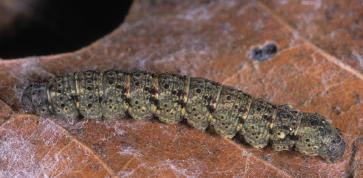
Larva

== Description ==
The length of the forewings is 10.5–13 millimetres (0.41–0.51 in). The forewings are subtriangular and pale to chocolate brown, and usually well marked. The antemedial line is toothed or scalloped and the discal spot is usually well developed. The postmedial line is toothed and thickened where it joins the costa. The subterminal line is straight, sparsely edged outwardly with pale scales. The hindwings are brown with a weak discal spot and variously-developed postmedial and subterminal lines.

== Ecology ==
There is one generation per year throughout most of the range with a single mid-summer flight from the end of June through early August. Records from early September in western North Carolina and northern Georgia are indicative of a small second brood. Adults have been taken at lights and sugar bait from a broad range of habitats that includes bogs, swamps, marshes, Atlantic white cedar swamps, swales, and other wetlands, mesic hardwood and Appalachian cove forests, a variety of boreal (conifer) forest types, and pitch pine/scrub oak barrens.

The larvae have been recorded feeding on dead, browned, lightly moistened leaves of Abies balsamea, Tsuga canadensis, Pseudotsuga menziesii, Hamamelis virginiana and Lonicera morrowii. They are mottled in brown, red, and yellow with a conspicuous pale subdorsal spot.

== Etymology ==
The species name is derived from the toothed antemedial and medial lines on the forewing.
