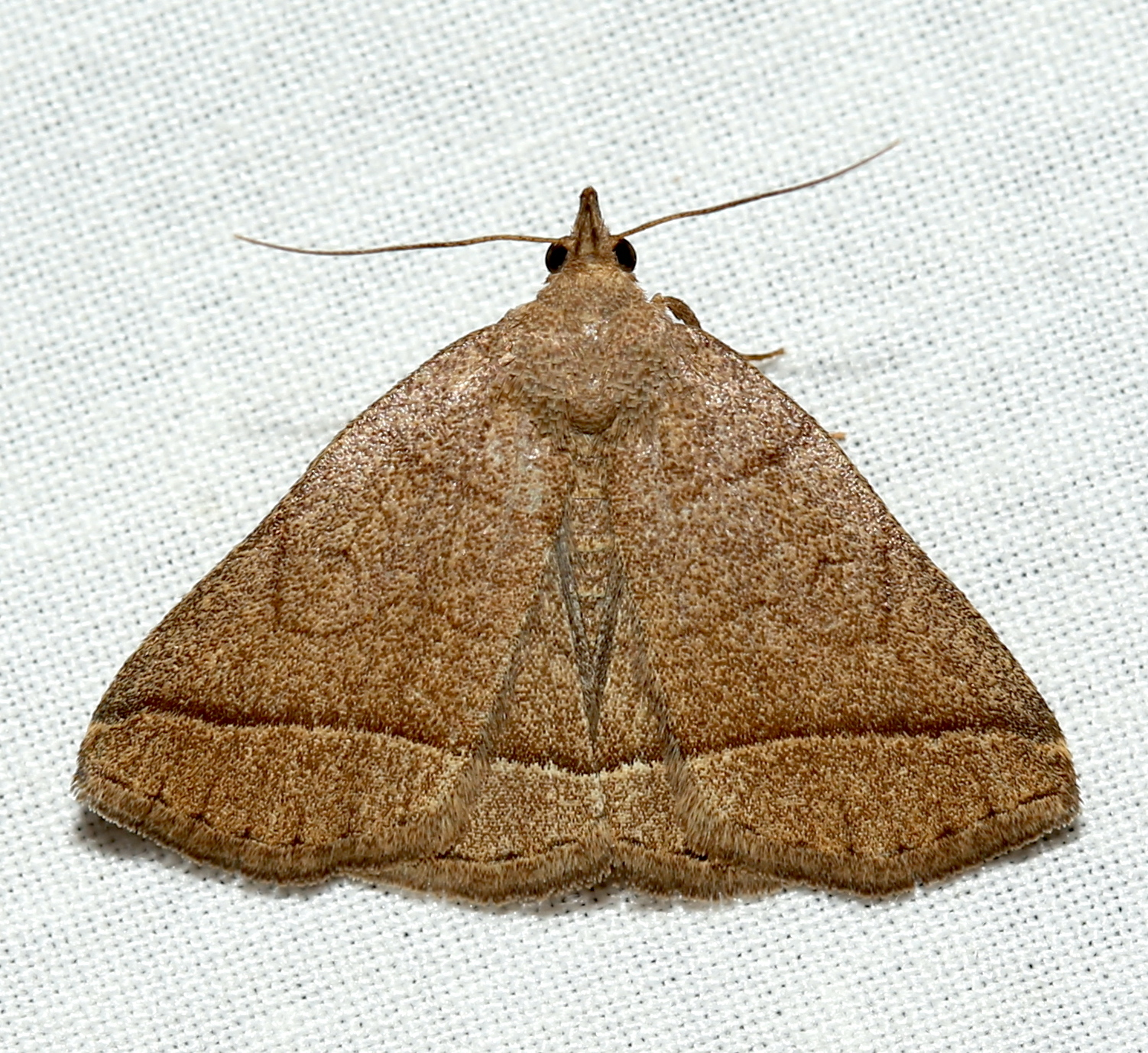

Scientific classification
- Kingdom: Animalia
- Phylum: Arthropoda
- Class: Insecta
- Order: Lepidoptera
- Superfamily: Noctuoidea
- Family: Erebidae
- Genus: Zanclognatha
- Species: Z. cruralis

Binomial name
- Zanclognatha cruralis (Guenée, 1854)

Synonyms
- Polypogon cruralis Guenée, 1854

= Zanclognatha cruralis =

Early zanclognatha

Species of moth

Zanclognatha cruralis, the early zanclognatha, is a species of litter moth of the family Erebidae. It is found from Wisconsin east through southern Canada, south to Florida and Texas.

The wingspan is 28–30 mm. Adults are on wing from April to July. There are two generations per year in the south.
