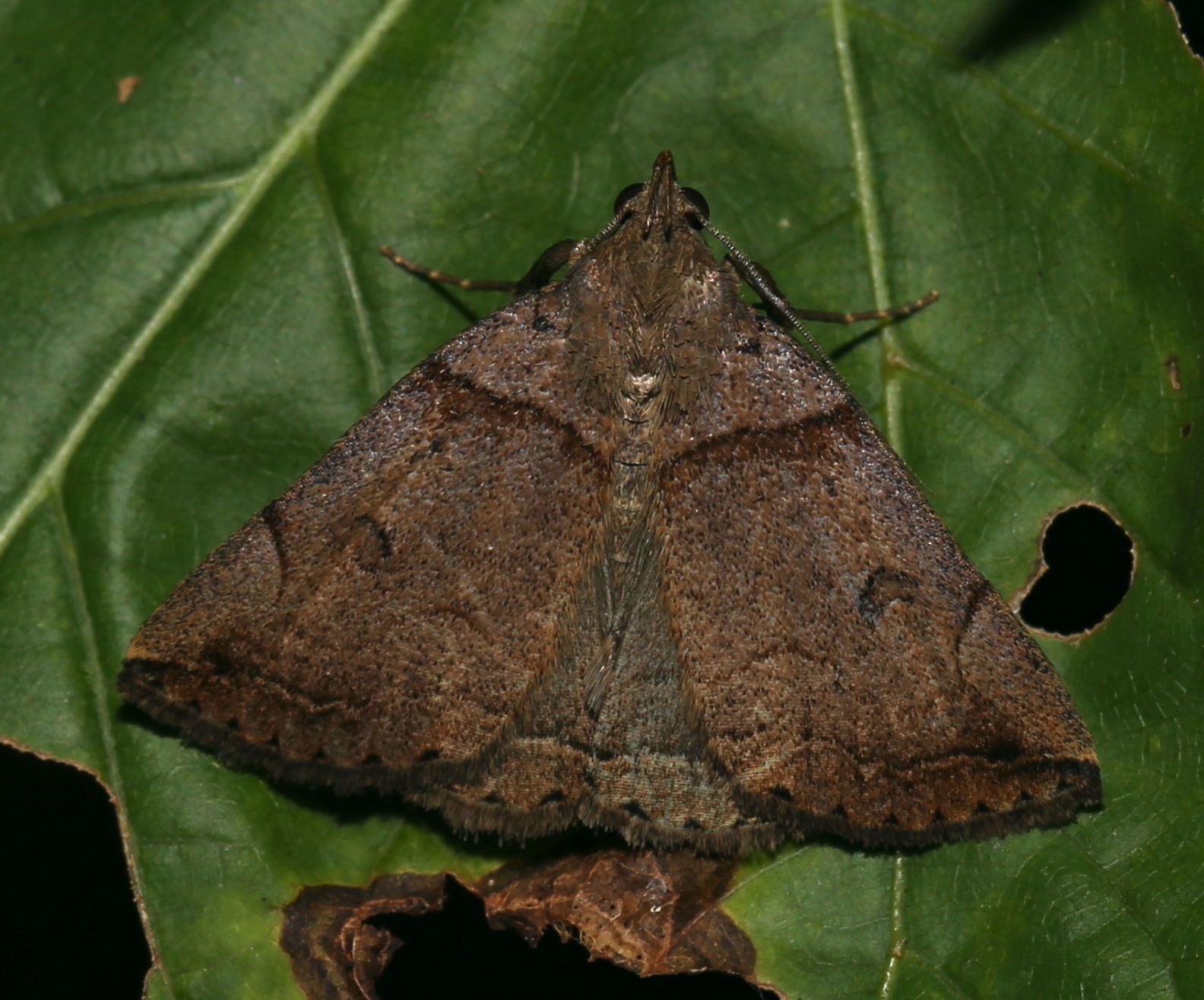

Scientific classification
- Kingdom: Animalia
- Phylum: Arthropoda
- Class: Insecta
- Order: Lepidoptera
- Superfamily: Noctuoidea
- Family: Erebidae
- Genus: Zanclognatha
- Species: Z. laevigata

Binomial name
- Zanclognatha laevigata (Grote, 1872)

Synonyms
- Polypogon laevigata Grote, 1872; Zanclognatha modestalis Dyar, 1903 (form); Zanclognatha reversata Dyar, 1903 (form); Zanclognatha obsoleta J. B. Smith, 1884 (form)

= Zanclognatha laevigata =

Species of moth

Zanclognatha laevigata, the variable zanclognatha, is a litter moth of the family Erebidae. It was described by Augustus Radcliffe Grote in 1872. It is found in North America from Manitoba to Nova Scotia, south to Florida and Missouri.

The wingspan is about 30 millimetres (1.2 in). There is one generation per year.

The larvae feed on detritus, including dead leaves.
