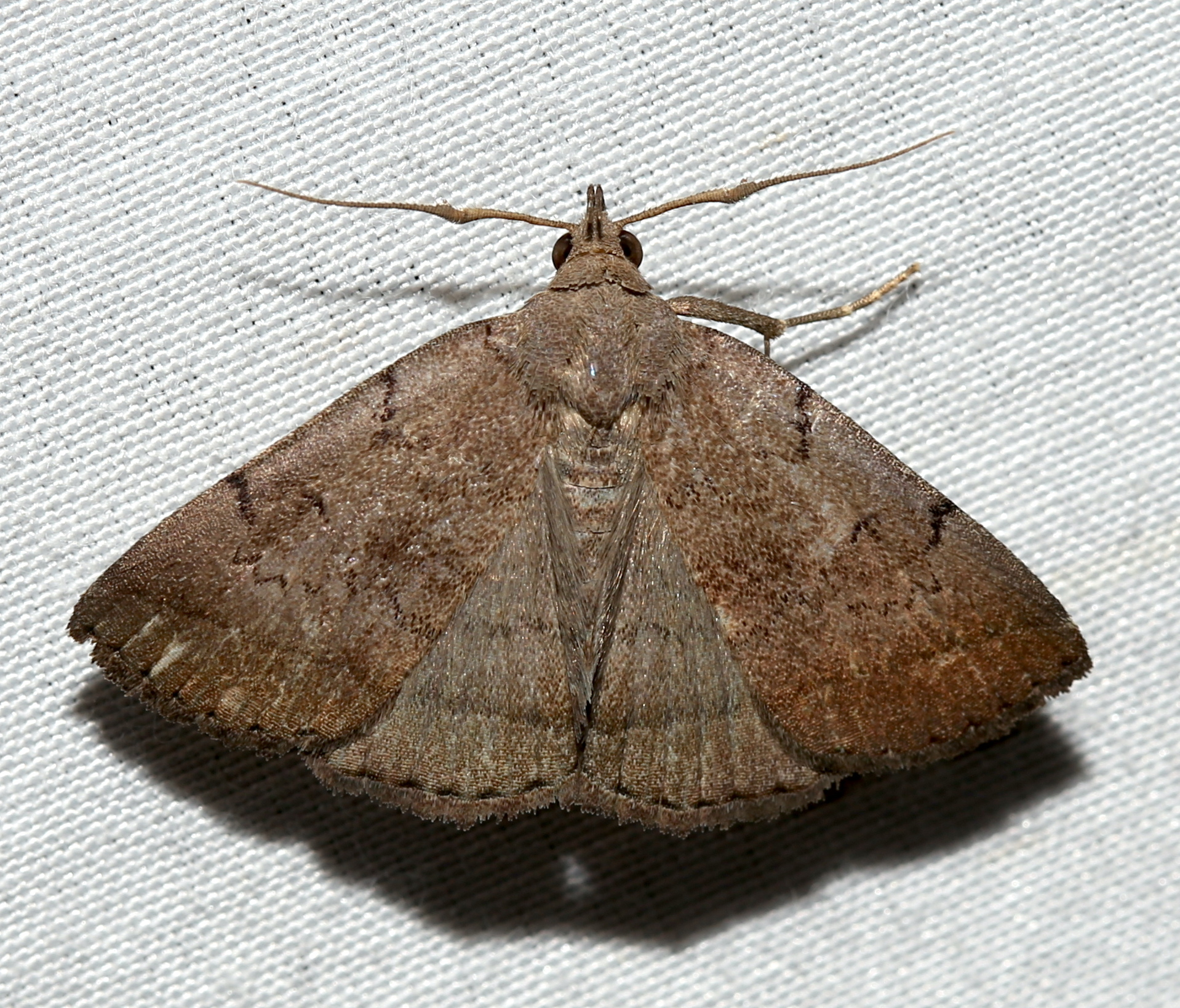

Scientific classification
- Kingdom: Animalia
- Phylum: Arthropoda
- Class: Insecta
- Order: Lepidoptera
- Superfamily: Noctuoidea
- Family: Erebidae
- Genus: Zanclognatha
- Species: Z. martha

Binomial name
- Zanclognatha martha Barnes, 1928

Synonyms
- Polypogon martha (Barnes, 1928)

= Zanclognatha martha =

Species of moth

Zanclognatha martha, the pine barrens zanclognatha or Martha's zanclognatha, is a litter moth of the family Erebidae. It was described by William Barnes in 1928. It is found from Ohio to Maine, south in the mountains to North Carolina and along the Coastal Plain to Texas. It is listed as threatened in the US state of Connecticut.

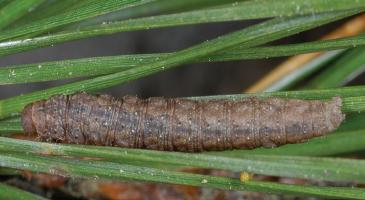
Larva

The wingspan is about 25 millimetres (0.98 in). There is one generation in Connecticut and Missouri and two generations in the south.

== Larval hosts ==
The larvae feed on decomposing Quercus ilicifolia leaves.
