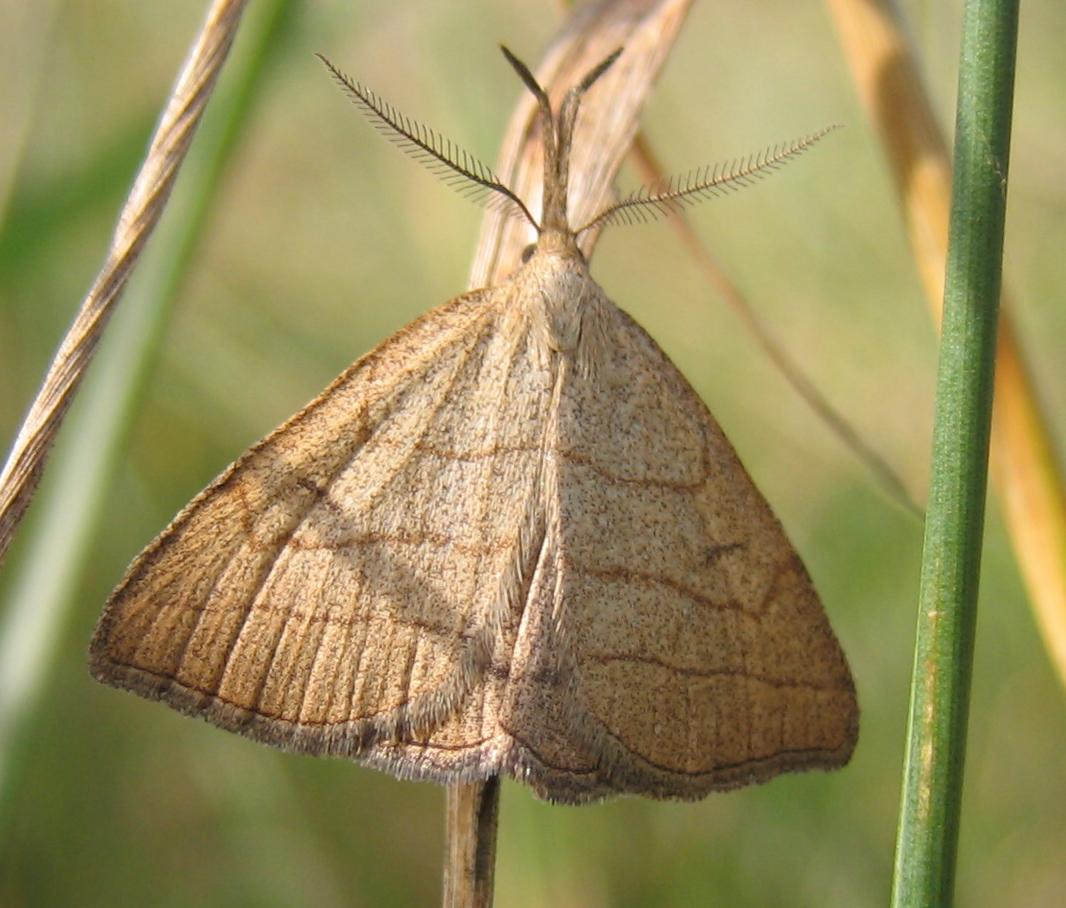

Scientific classification
- Kingdom: Animalia
- Phylum: Arthropoda
- Class: Insecta
- Order: Lepidoptera
- Superfamily: Noctuoidea
- Family: Erebidae
- Genus: Polypogon
- Species: P. tentacularia

Binomial name
- Polypogon tentacularia (Linnaeus, 1758)

= Polypogon tentacularia =

Species of moth

Polypogon tentacularia is a species of litter moth of the family Erebidae. The species was first described by Carl Linnaeus in his 1758 10th edition of Systema Naturae. It is found in Europe.

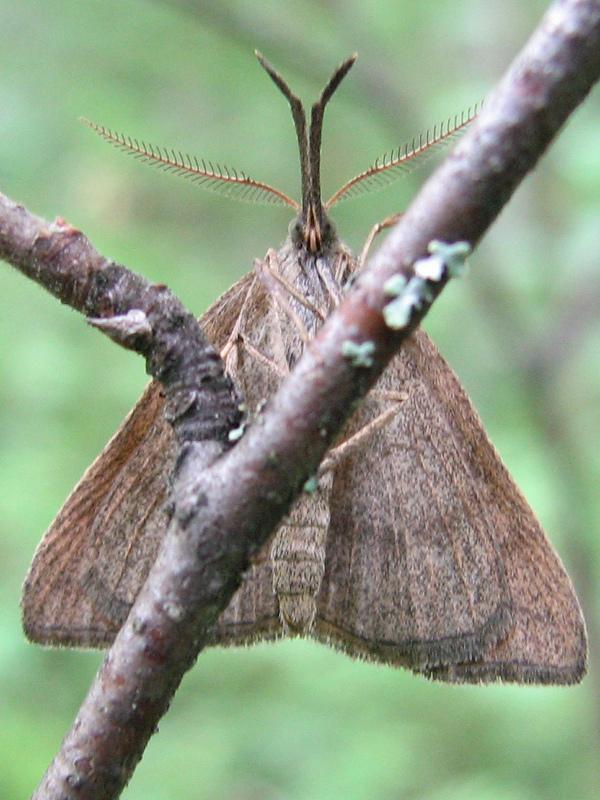

The wingspan is about 30 millimetres (1.2 in). The moth flies from June to July depending on the location.

The larvae feed on Taraxacum officinale, goldenrod and hawkweed.
