= Dichomeris bisignellus =

Scientific classification
- Kingdom: Animalia
- Phylum: Arthropoda
- Class: Insecta
- Order: Lepidoptera
- Family: Gelechiidae
- Genus: Dichomeris
- Species: D. bisignellus

Binomial name
- Dichomeris bisignellus (Snellen, 1885)

Synonyms
- Ypsolophus bisignellus Snellen, 1885; Ypsolophus deltaspis Meyrick, 1905 (disputed)

Species of moth

Dichomeris bisignellus is a moth in the family Gelechiidae. It was described by Snellen in 1885. It is found in India, on Sulawesi and eastern Africa.
