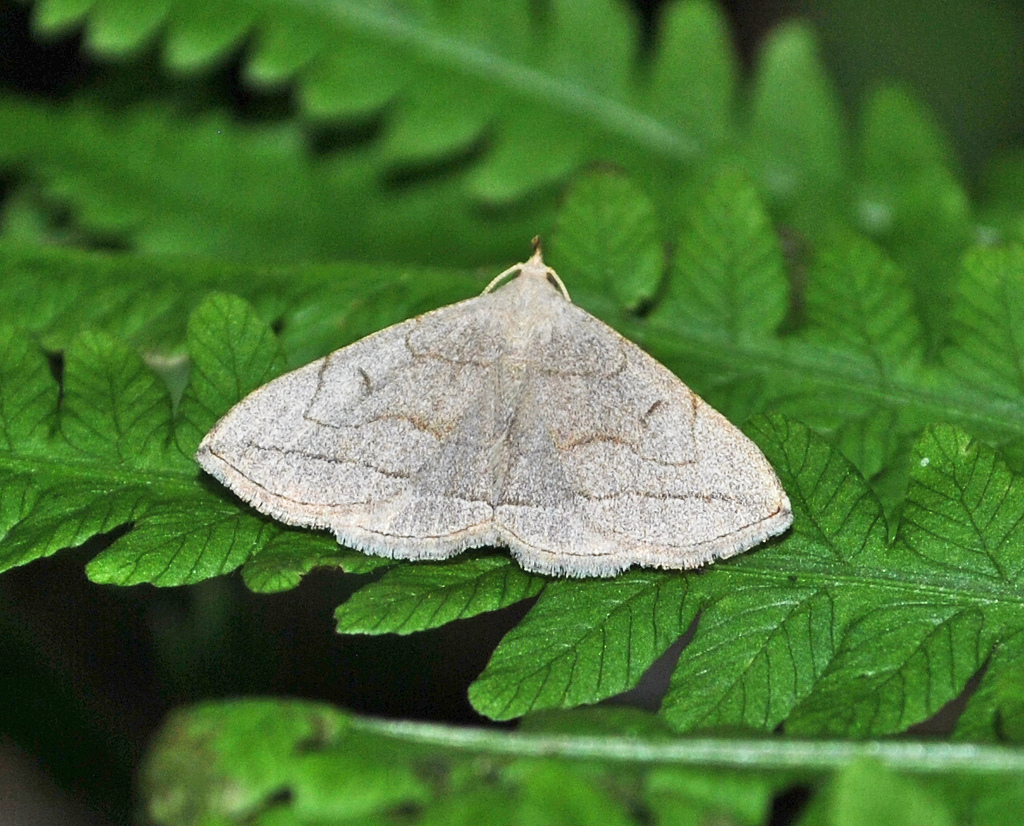

Scientific classification
- Domain: Eukaryota
- Kingdom: Animalia
- Phylum: Arthropoda
- Class: Insecta
- Order: Lepidoptera
- Superfamily: Noctuoidea
- Family: Erebidae
- Genus: Zanclognatha
- Species: Z. pedipilalis

Binomial name
- Zanclognatha pedipilalis (Guenée, 1854)

Synonyms
- Polypogon pedipilalis Guenée, 1854

= Zanclognatha pedipilalis =

Species of moth

Zanclognatha pedipilalis, the grayish zanclognatha, is a litter moth of the family Erebidae. The species was first described by Achille Guenée in 1854. It is found in eastern North America, from Nova Scotia south to Florida and Mississippi, west to Alberta and Kansas.

The wingspan is 24–30 millimetres (0.94–1.18 in). Adults are on wing from May to August. There is one generation in the north, with a partial second brood in Connecticut. There are two broods in Missouri and multiple generations in Florida.

The larvae feed on dead leaves in deciduous woods.
