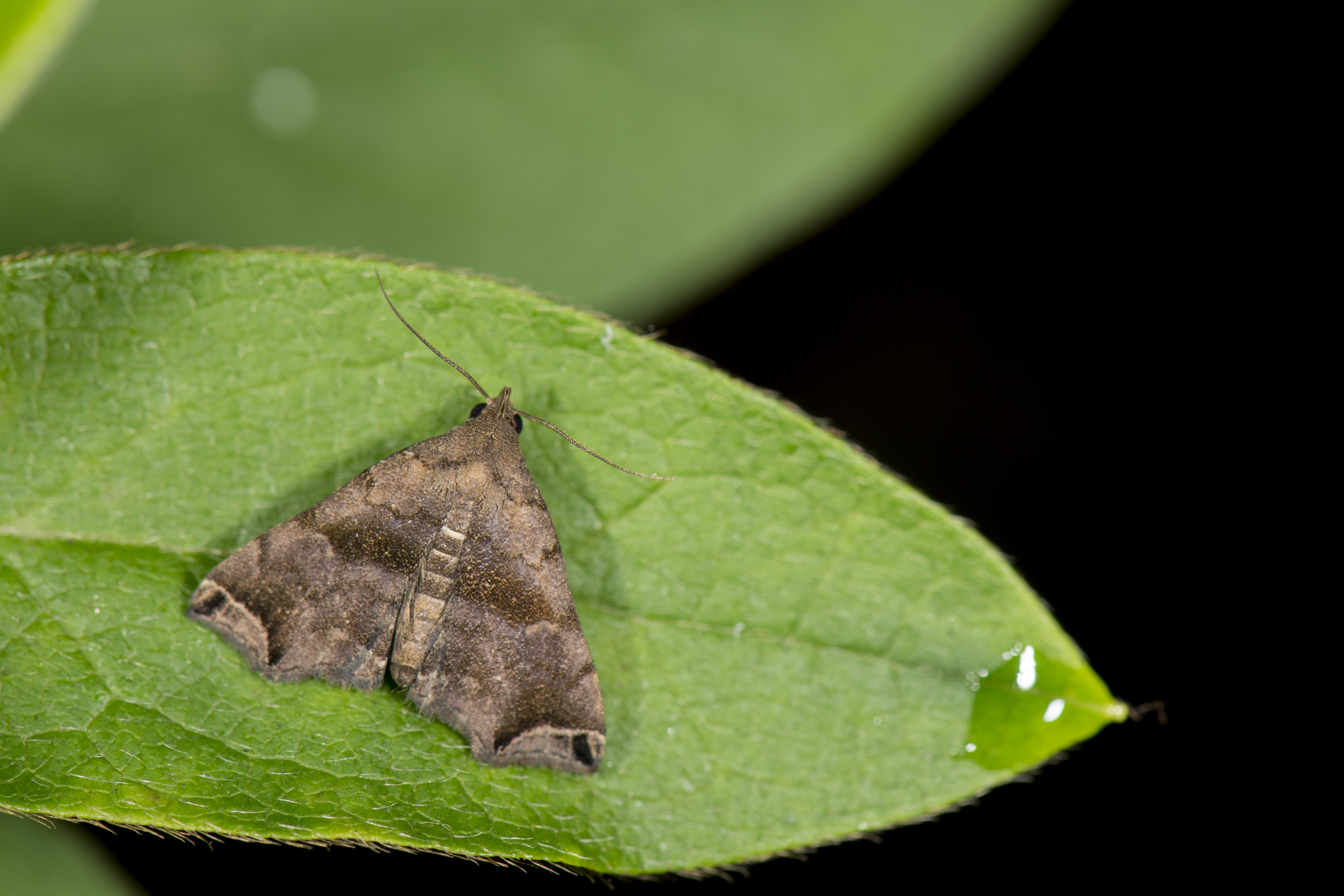

Scientific classification
- Kingdom: Animalia
- Phylum: Arthropoda
- Class: Insecta
- Order: Lepidoptera
- Superfamily: Noctuoidea
- Family: Erebidae
- Genus: Hipoepa
- Species: H. biasalis

Binomial name
- Hipoepa biasalis (Walker, [1859])

Synonyms
- Bocana biasalis Walker, [1859] 1858; Hipoepa lapsalis Walker, [1859] 1858; Nagadeba obenbergeri Strand, 1920

= Hipoepa biasalis =

Species of moth

Hipoepa biasalis is a moth of the family Noctuidae first described by Francis Walker in 1859. It is found in Oriental tropics of India and Sri Lanka to Taiwan, Sumatra, Borneo, the Philippines and Sulawesi.

Adult greyish with more darkly marked in black. Forewing medial band diffuse. Straight, whitish submarginal band with black zone which runs from the forewing costa to dorsum. Hindwings slightly paler than forewings. The caterpillar feeds on dead foliage. It is also recorded as a defoliator of soybeans in Rajasthan, India.

== Gallery ==
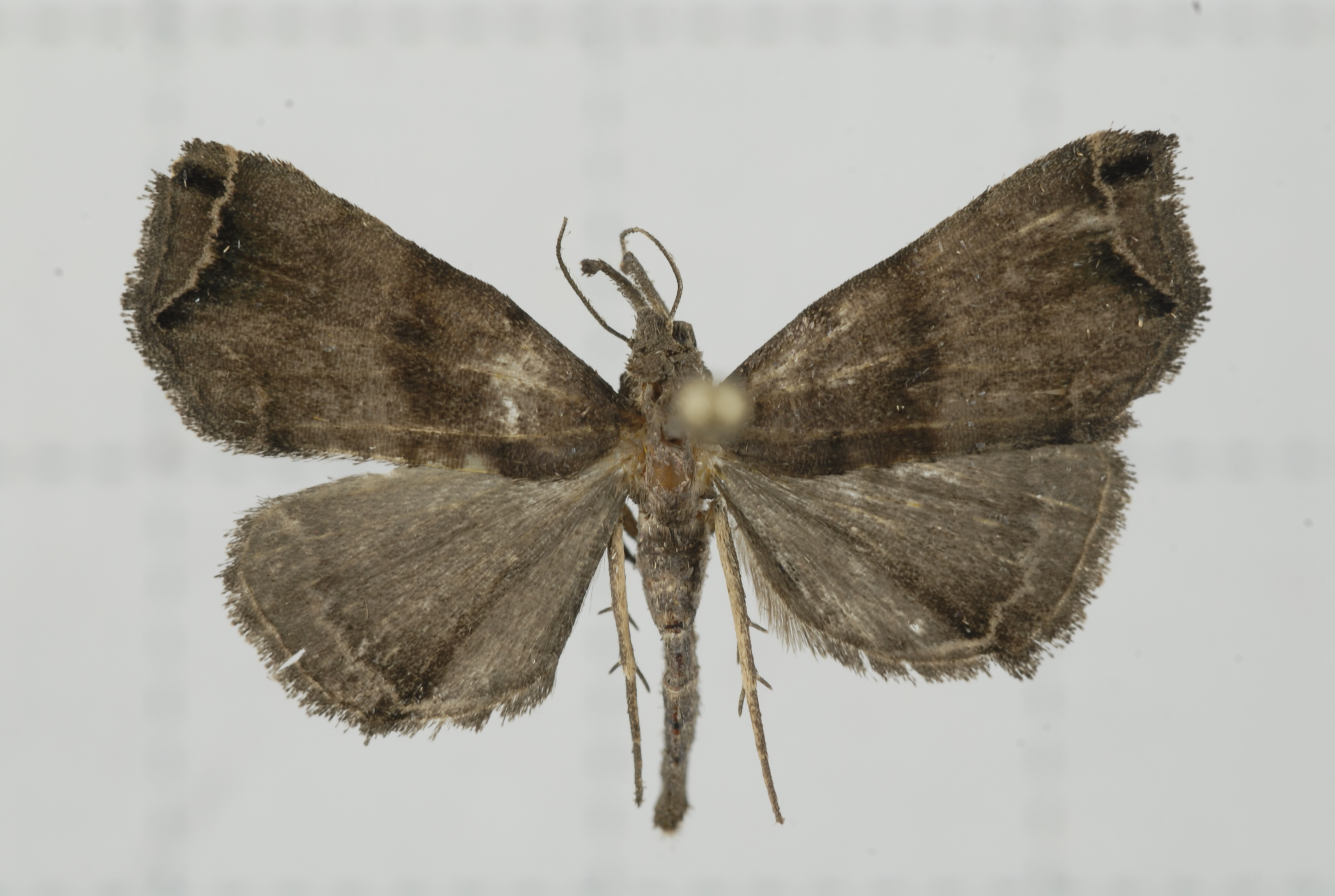

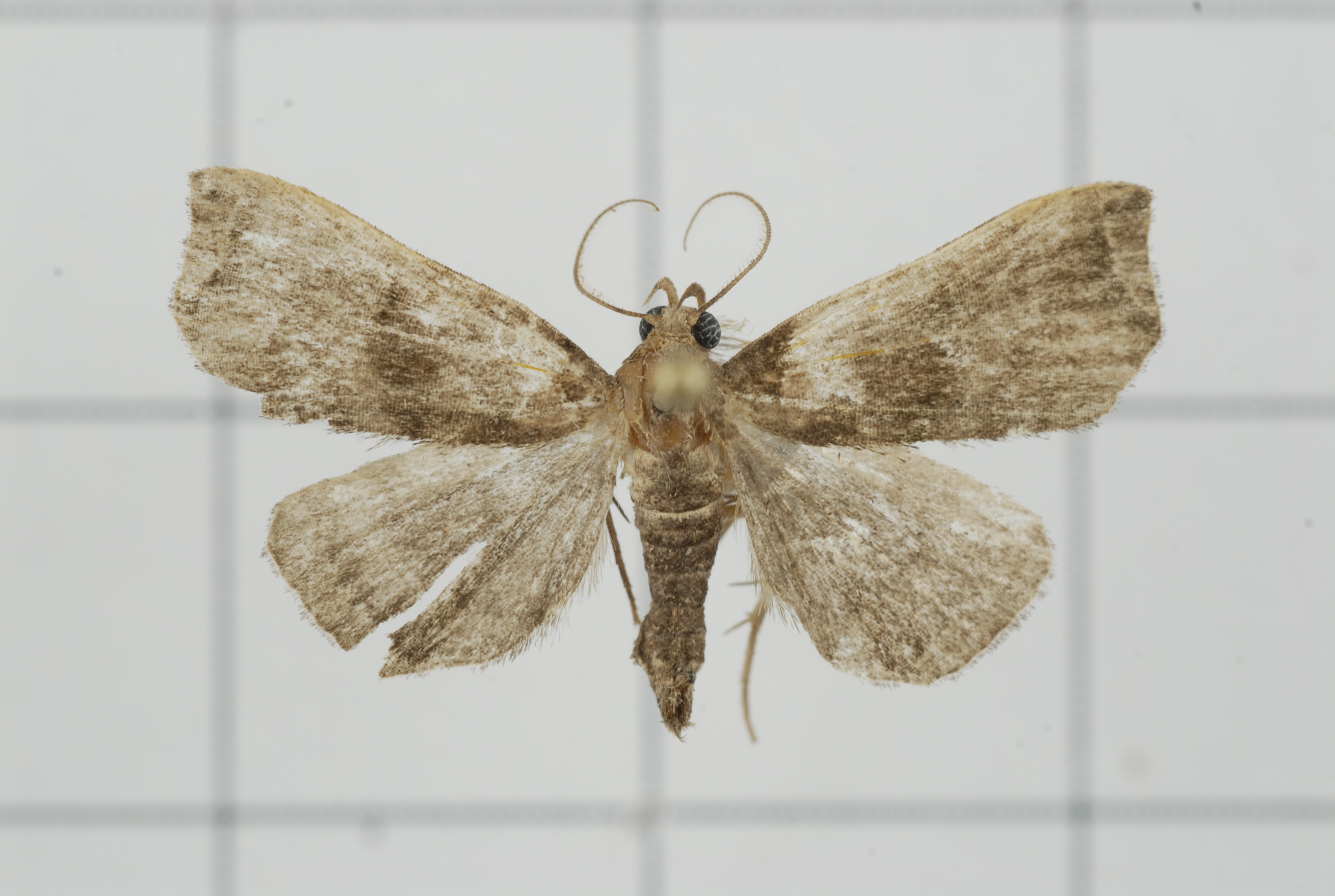

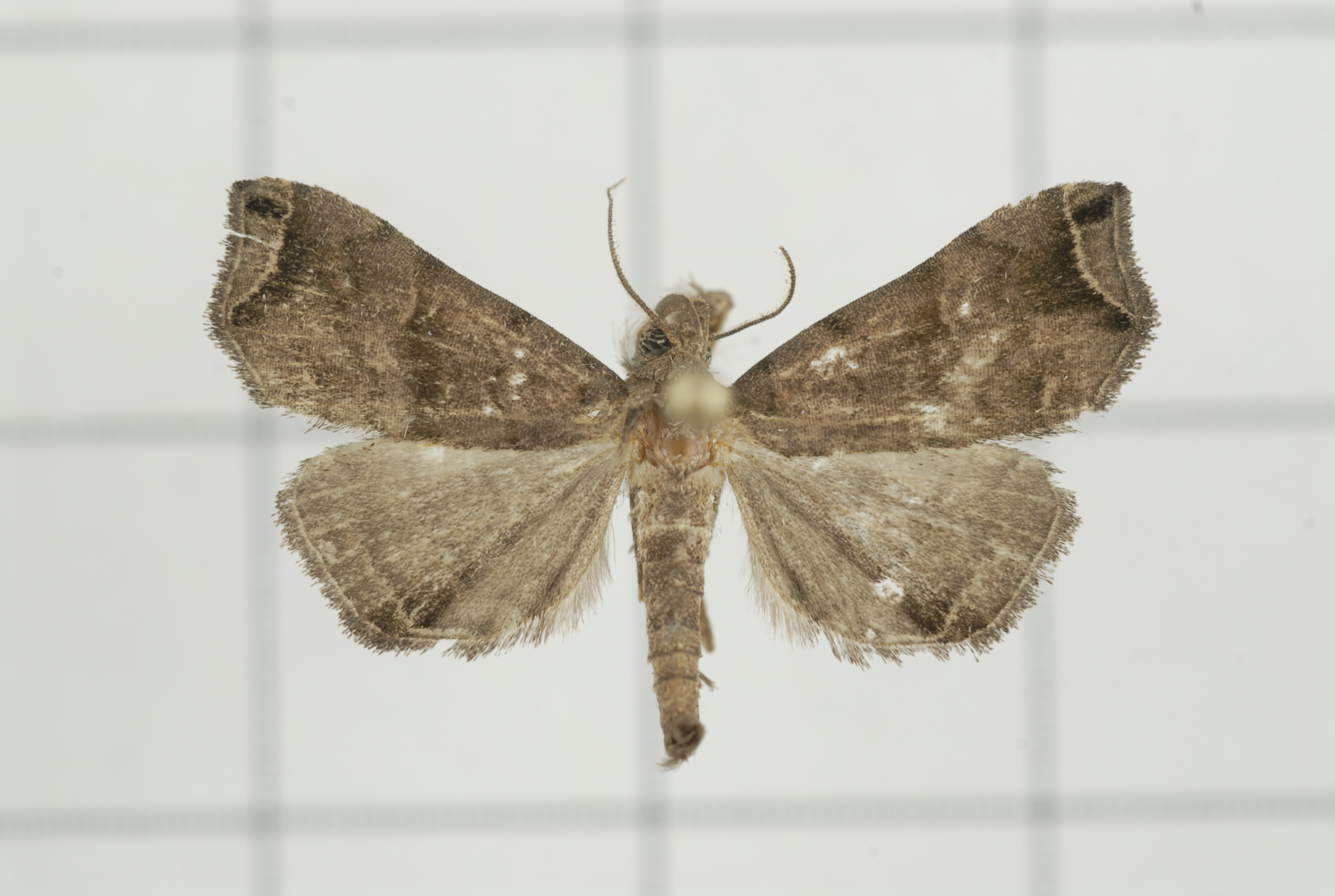

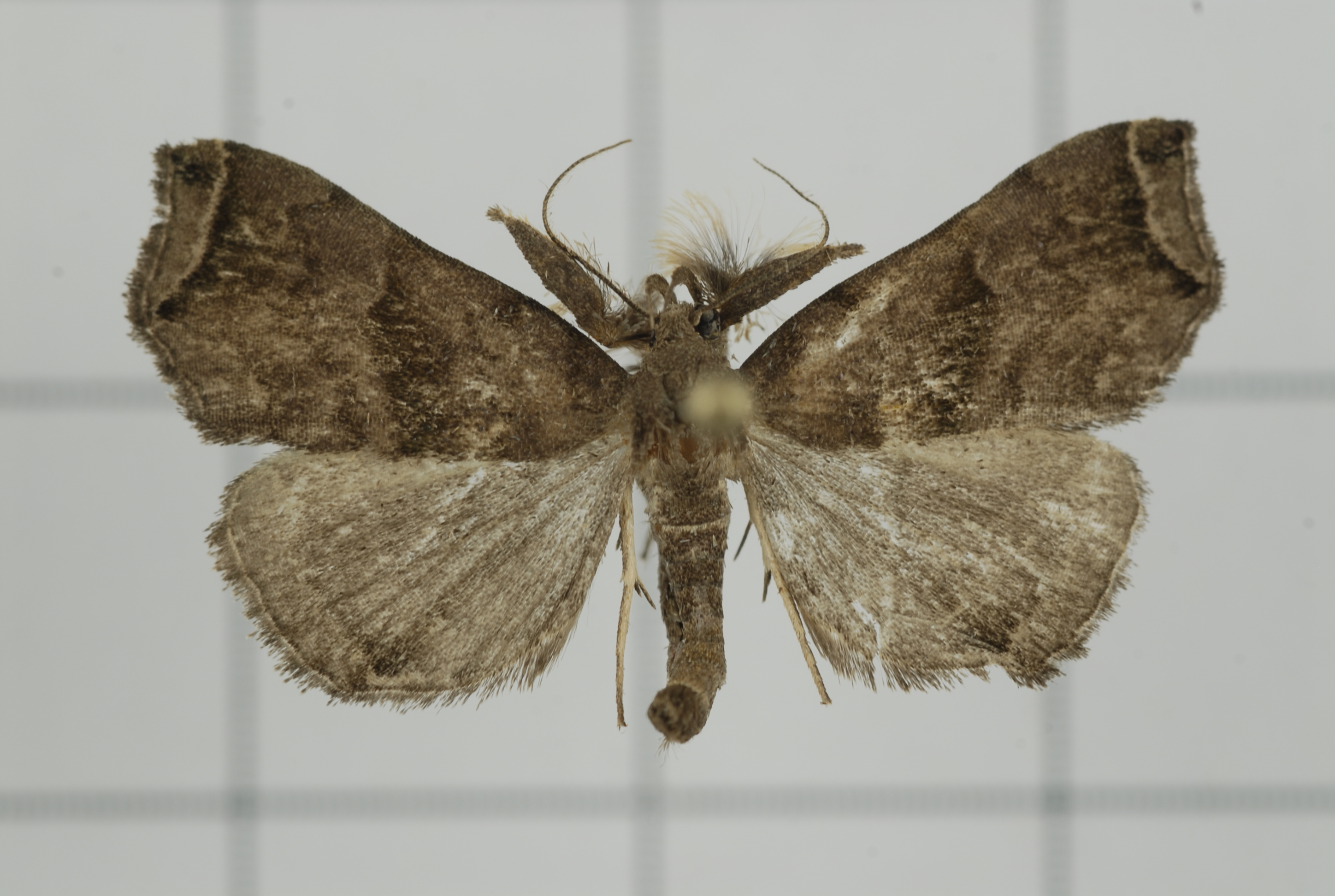
