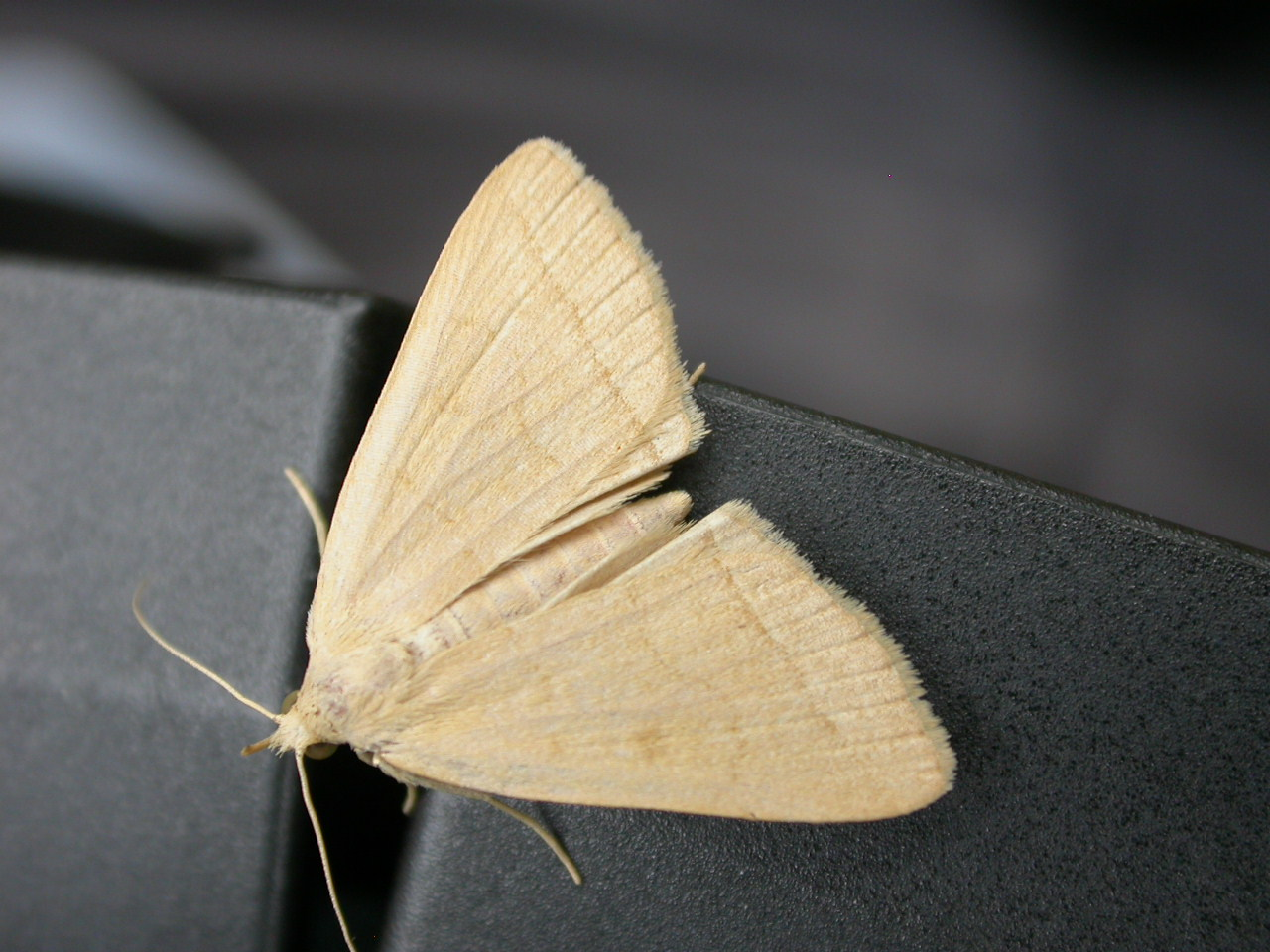
- Zanclognatha tarsipennalis

Scientific classification
- Kingdom: Animalia
- Phylum: Arthropoda
- Clade: Pancrustacea
- Class: Insecta
- Order: Lepidoptera
- Superfamily: Noctuoidea
- Family: Erebidae
- Subfamily: Herminiinae
- Genus: Zanclognatha; Lederer, 1857

Synonyms
- Adrapsoides Matsumura, 1925; Cleptomita Grote, 1873; Megachyta Grote, 1873; Mesoplectra Butler, 1879; Pityolita Grote, 1873; Zellerminia Beck, 1996

= Zanclognatha =

Genus of moths

Zanclognatha is a genus of litter moths of the family Erebidae. The genus was erected by Julius Lederer in 1857.

== Taxonomy ==
Zanclognatha was considered synonym of Polypogon in 1989. It became its own genus in 1991, but then became a synonym of Polypogon again in 1996. However, sources from 1998 and 2005 recommend keeping the two genera split.

It is not clear how many valid species are part of the genus; some species are likely made up of at least two valid species-level taxa that have yet to be officially split, and there are some familiar taxa that have not yet been described to science. Adult Zanclognatha species are often difficult to tell apart; wing patterns and genital morphology, two characters often used to distinguish moth species, are not necessarily useful for classifying them. The larvae are more distinctive and may be more helpful in future studies of the genus.

== Species ==
- Zanclognatha angulina (Leech, 1900)
- Zanclognatha atrilineella (Grote, 1873)
- Zanclognatha bryanti Barnes, 1928
- Zanclognatha cruralis (Guenée, 1854) - early zanclognatha moth
- Zanclognatha dentata Wagner & McCabe, 2011 - Coastal Plain zanclognatha moth
- Zanclognatha helva (Butler, 1879)
- Zanclognatha inspidalis (Wileman, 1915)
- Zanclognatha jacchusalis (Walker, 1859) - wavy-lined zanclognatha moth
- Zanclognatha laevigata (Grote, 1872) - variable zanclognatha moth
- Zanclognatha lituralis (Hübner, 1818) - lettered zanclognatha moth
- Zanclognatha lunalis (Scopoli, 1763) - jubilee fan-foot
- Zanclognatha marcidilinea (Walker, 1859) - yellowish zanclognatha moth
- Zanclognatha martha Barnes, 1928 - pine barrens zanclognatha moth, Martha's zanclognatha moth
- Zanclognatha minoralis J. B. Smith, 1895
- Zanclognatha nakatomii Owada, 1977
- Zanclognatha nigrisigna (Wileman, 1915)
- Zanclognatha obscuripennis (Grote, 1872) - dark zanclognatha moth
- Zanclognatha pedipilalis (Guenée, 1854) - grayish zanclognatha moth
- Zanclognatha protumnusalis (Walker, 1859) - conifer zanclognatha moth
- Zanclognatha reticulatis (Leech, 1900)
- Zanclognatha subtriplex Strand, 1919
- Zanclognatha tarsipennalis (Treitschke, 1835)
- Zanclognatha theralis (Walker, 1859) (syn. Z. deceptricalis Zeller, 1873, Z. gypsalis (Grote, 1880), Z. inconspicualis (Grote, 1883))
- Zanclognatha yaeyamalis Owada, 1977
- Zanclognatha zelleralis (Wocke, 1850)
