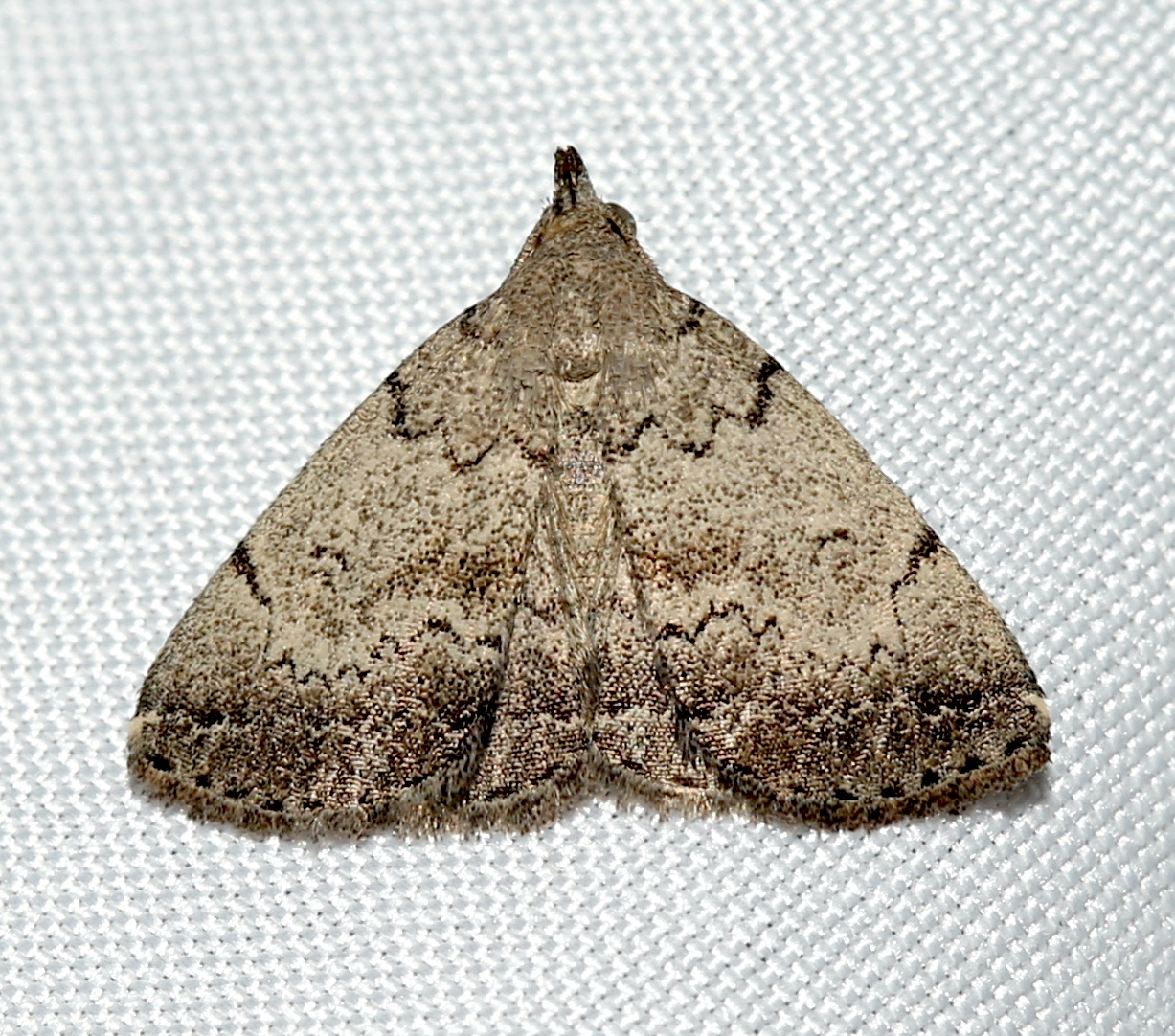

Scientific classification
- Kingdom: Animalia
- Phylum: Arthropoda
- Class: Insecta
- Order: Lepidoptera
- Superfamily: Noctuoidea
- Family: Erebidae
- Genus: Zanclognatha
- Species: Z. theralis

Binomial name
- Zanclognatha theralis (Walker, 1859)

Synonyms
- Polypogon theralis (Walker, 1859)

= Zanclognatha theralis =

Species of moth

Zanclognatha theralis, the noctuid moth, is a species of moth native to North America. It was described by Francis Walker in 1859. It is listed as threatened in the US state of Connecticut.
