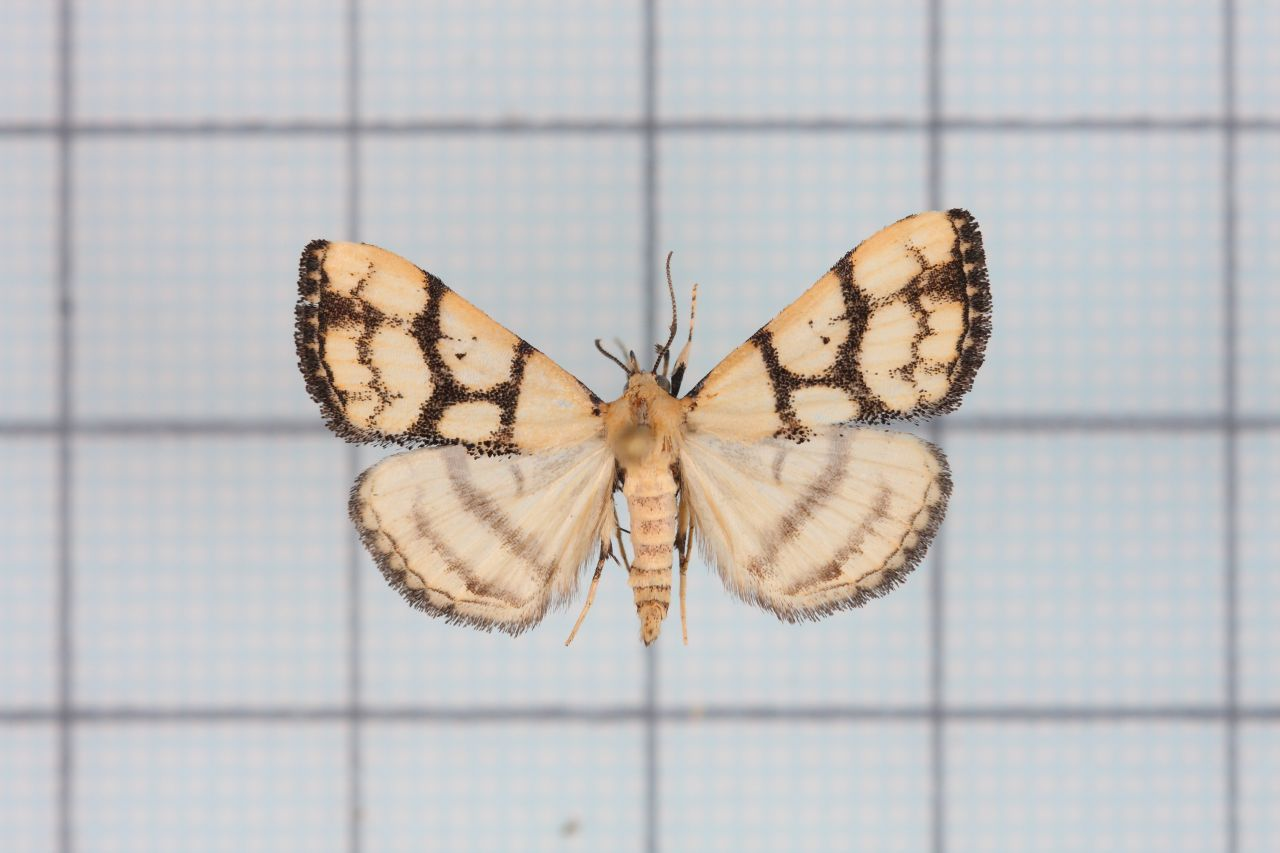

Scientific classification
- Kingdom: Animalia
- Phylum: Arthropoda
- Class: Insecta
- Order: Lepidoptera
- Superfamily: Noctuoidea
- Family: Erebidae
- Genus: Zanclognatha
- Species: Z. reticulatis

Binomial name
- Zanclognatha reticulatis (Leech, 1900)

Synonyms
- Adrapsa reticulatis Leech, 1900; Adrapsoides ruptistigma Holloway, 1976

= Zanclognatha reticulatis =

Species of moth

Zanclognatha reticulatis is a species of litter moth of the family Erebidae. It was described by John Henry Leech in 1900. It is found in Taiwan, Japan and the Kuriles.

The wingspan is 25–27 millimetres (0.98–1.06 in).
