= Zanclognatha minoralis =

Scientific classification
- Kingdom: Animalia
- Phylum: Arthropoda
- Class: Insecta
- Order: Lepidoptera
- Superfamily: Noctuoidea
- Family: Erebidae
- Genus: Zanclognatha
- Species: Z. minoralis

Binomial name
- Zanclognatha minoralis (Walker, [1866])

Synonyms
- Bleptina minoralis Walker, [1866]; Polypogon minoralis (Walker, [1866])

Species of moth

Zanclognatha minoralis is a moth of the family Noctuidae first described by Francis Walker in 1866. It is found in Sri Lanka.
