= Hipoepa =

Scientific classification
- Kingdom: Animalia
- Phylum: Arthropoda
- Class: Insecta
- Order: Lepidoptera
- Superfamily: Noctuoidea
- Family: Erebidae
- Subfamily: Herminiinae
- Genus: Hipoepa; Walker, 1859

Genus of moths

Hipoepa is a genus of moths of the family Noctuidae first described by Francis Walker in 1859. It is sometimes considered to be a synonym of Polypogon.

== Species ==
- Hipoepa biasalis (Walker, [1859]) Oriental Tropics - Taiwan, Sumatra, Borneo, Philippines, Sulawesi, Seram
- Hipoepa fractalis (Guenée, 1854) Africa, Japan, Korea, China, India, Oriental Tropics - Sumatra, Borneo, Sulawesi, Australia
- Hipoepa plebejus (Rothschild, 1920) Sumatra, Borneo
- Hipoepa porphyrialis (Pagenstecher, 1900) Moluccas, New Guinea
