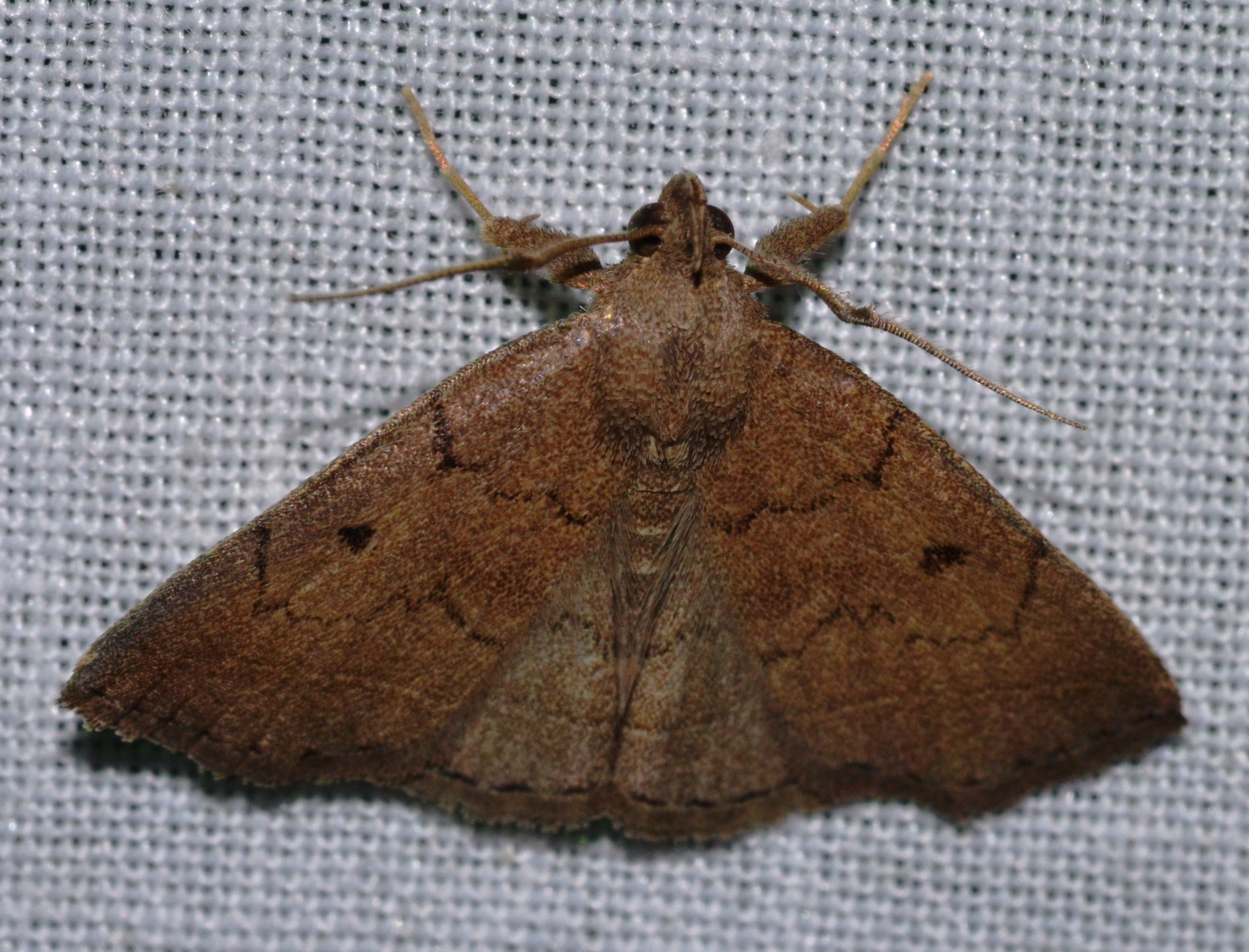

Scientific classification
- Domain: Eukaryota
- Kingdom: Animalia
- Phylum: Arthropoda
- Class: Insecta
- Order: Lepidoptera
- Superfamily: Noctuoidea
- Family: Erebidae
- Genus: Zanclognatha
- Species: Z. protumnusalis

Binomial name
- Zanclognatha protumnusalis (Walker, 1859)

Synonyms
- Polypogon protumnusalis Walker, 1859; Zanclognatha minimalis Grote, 1878

= Zanclognatha protumnusalis =

Species of moth

Zanclognatha protumnusalis, the conifer zanclognatha, is a litter moth of the family Erebidae. It was described by Francis Walker in 1859. It is found from southern Canada to Florida and Texas.

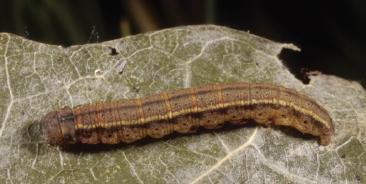
Larva

The wingspan is about 25 millimetres (0.98 in). Adults are on wing from July to September. There is one generation in the north. There is a partial second generation in New Jersey and two or more broods in the south.
