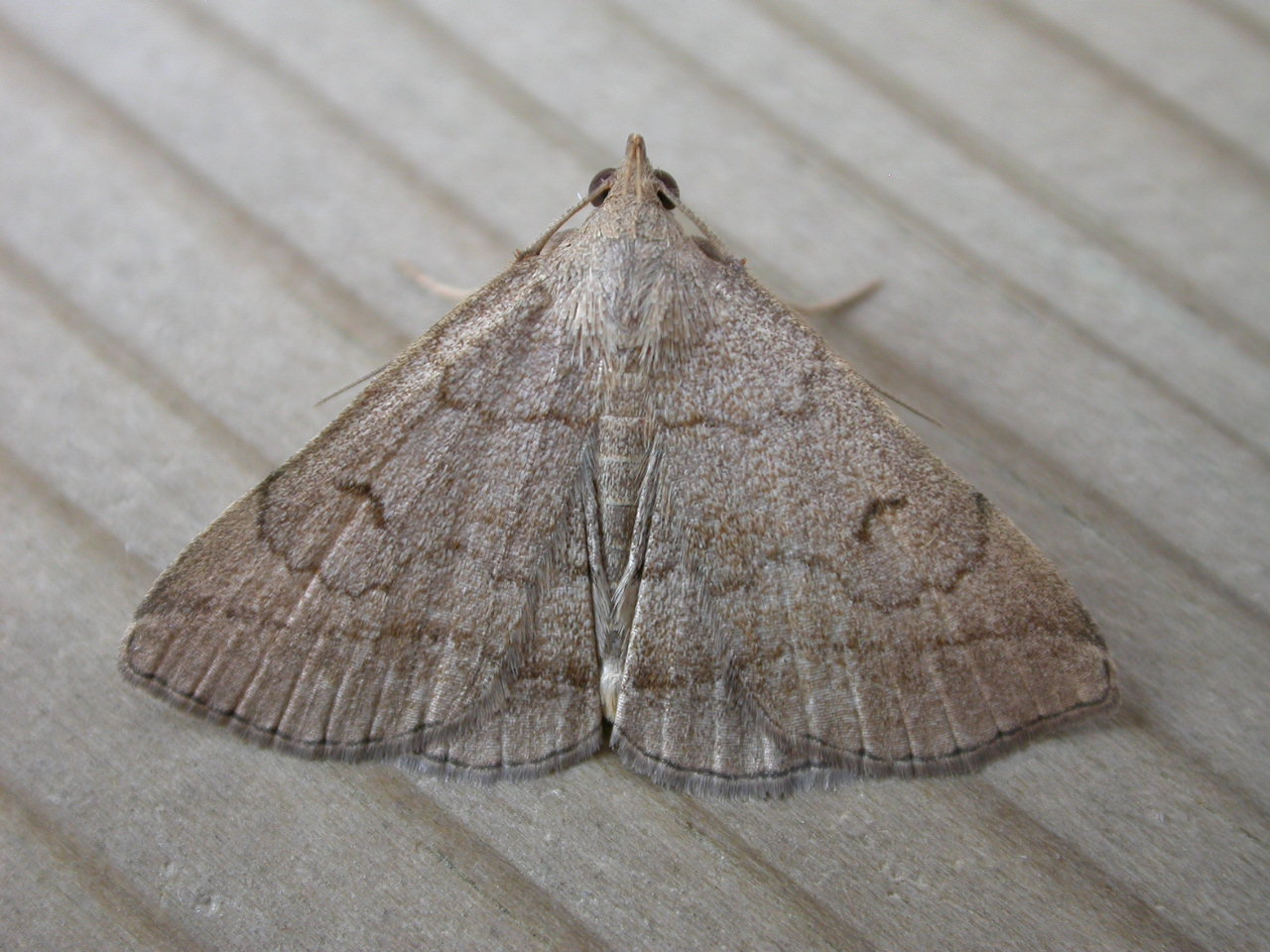

Scientific classification
- Domain: Eukaryota
- Kingdom: Animalia
- Phylum: Arthropoda
- Class: Insecta
- Order: Lepidoptera
- Superfamily: Noctuoidea
- Family: Erebidae
- Genus: Zanclognatha
- Species: Z. lunalis

Binomial name
- Zanclognatha lunalis (Scopoli, 1763)

= Zanclognatha lunalis =

Species of moth

Zanclognatha lunalis, the jubilee fan-foot, is a moth of the family Noctuidae. The species was first described by Giovanni Antonio Scopoli in his 1763 Entomologia Carniolica. It can be found across the Palearctic realm (Europe to the Russian Far East and Japan).

== Technical description and variation ==
as Z. tarsiplumalis Hbn. [synonym]. Forewing grey brown with a faint purplish tinge and outer lines dark brown, fine and faint; the inner bent on each fold, vertical in the main; the outer widely excurved and irregularly crenulate beyond cell, insinuate on submedian fold; subterminal line stronger, oblique from before apex and straight, outwardly edged by whitish; a conspicuous slender brown lunule at end of cell; terminal line dark, edged with a bright white line at base of fringe; hindwing with outer and subterminal lines marked on inner marginal half of wing. Larva reddish yellow; the segmental incisions paler: dorsal line red brown; three subdorsal, irregularly crenulate or hidden in blotches, finer, parallel, pale reddish lines; beneath the black spiracles a double irregularly crenulate lateral line.

The wingspan is 32–36 millimetres (1.3–1.4 in).

== Biology ==
The moths flies from June to August depending on the location.

The larvae feed on dried leaves.
