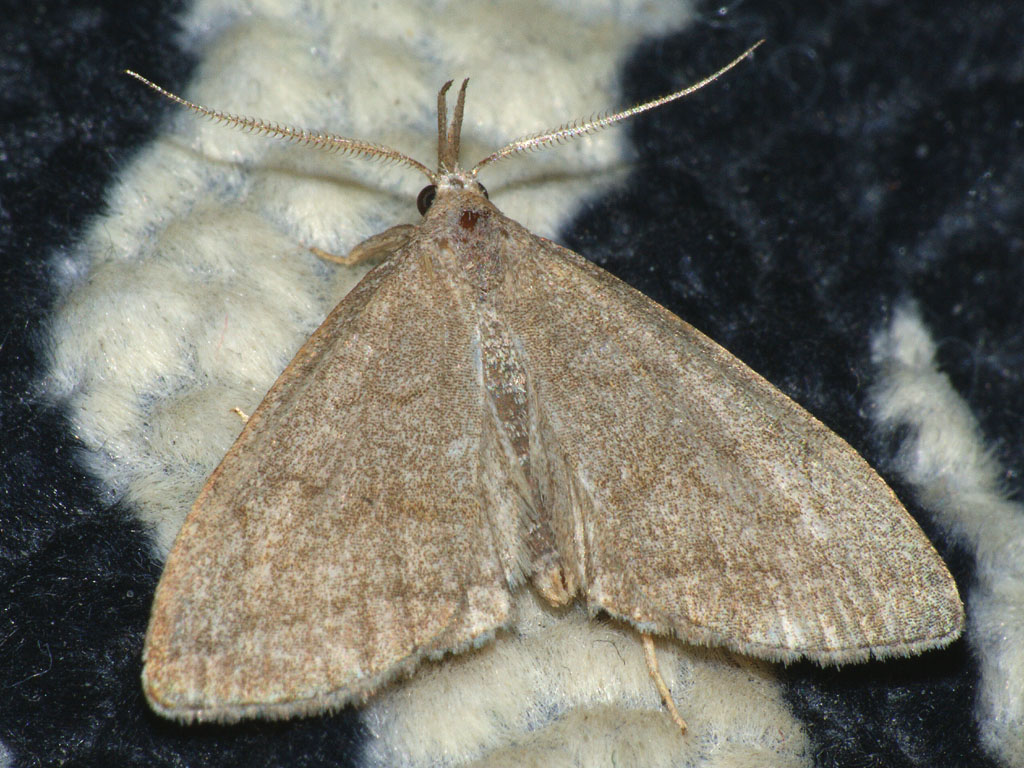

Scientific classification
- Kingdom: Animalia
- Phylum: Arthropoda
- Class: Insecta
- Order: Lepidoptera
- Superfamily: Noctuoidea
- Family: Erebidae
- Genus: Pechipogo
- Species: P. strigilata

Binomial name
- Pechipogo strigilata (Linnaeus, 1758)

Synonyms
- Phalaena (Geometra) strigilata Linnaeus, 1758; [Phalaena] barbalis Clerck, 1759; Phalaena palpalis Fabricius, 1775; Pyralis pectitalis Hübner, 1796; Crambus barbata Haworth, 1809; Crambus palpatus Haworth, 1809; Pechipogon barbalis; Polypogon strigilatus

= Pechipogo strigilata =

Common fan-foot

Species of moth

Pechipogo strigilata, the common fan-foot, is a moth of the family Noctuidae. It was described by Carl Linnaeus in 1758. It is found throughout Europe to the Urals then east across the Palearctic to Siberia, Amur, Ussuri, Korea and Japan.

== Technical description and variation ==
The wingspan is 30–35 millimetres (1.2–1.4 in). Its forewings are ochreous dusted very densely with yellow brown; a slight dark cell mark; inner and outer lines brownish, more or less parallel, the inner curved in cell, the outer more widely beyond it; subterminal line oblique; hindwing with costal area pale, without markings; a faint outer line; subterminal dark, externally edged with pale.

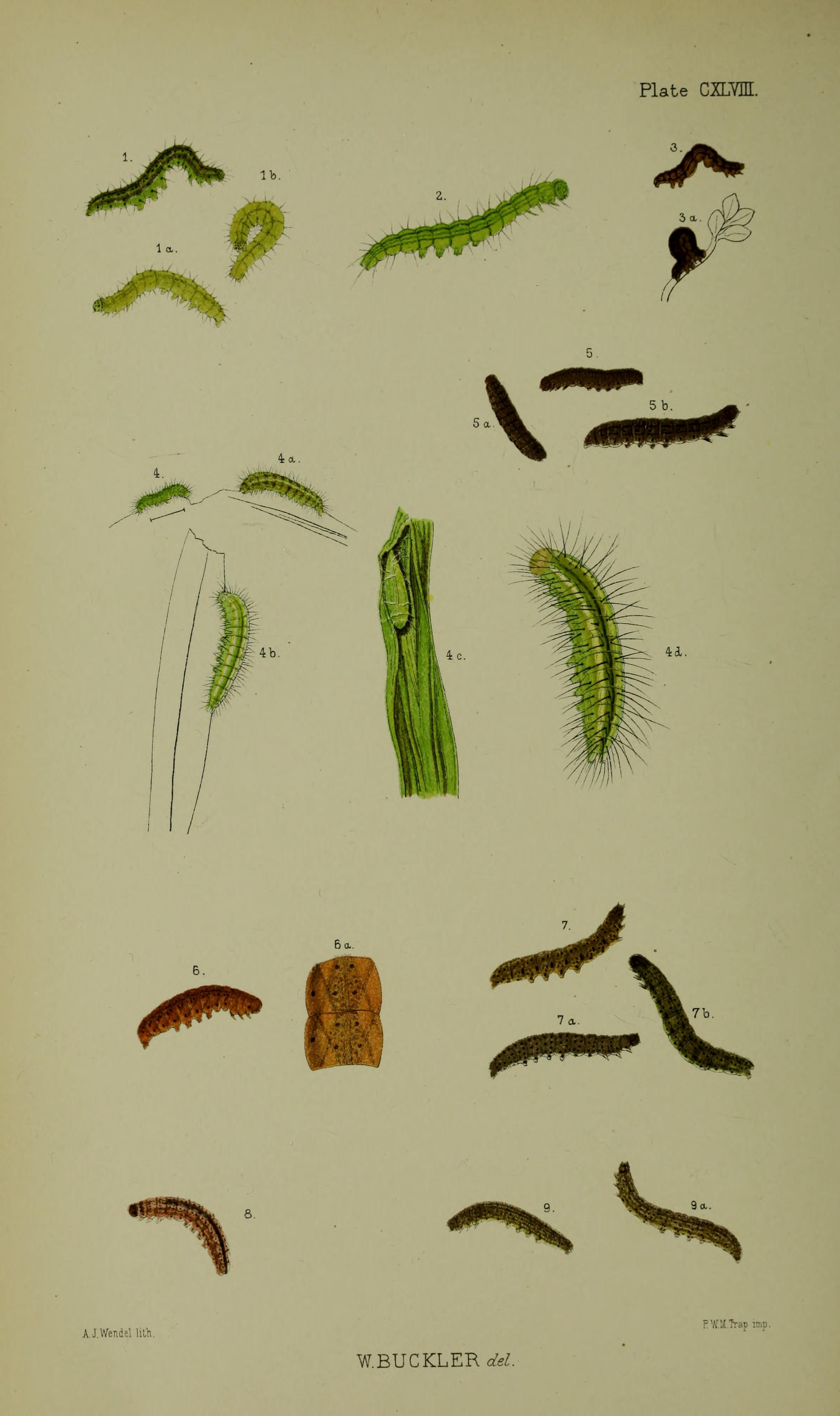
Figs. 6 larva after hibernation on birch catkins 6a enlargement of two segments

== Biology ==
The moth flies from late May until early July.

Larvae are dull reddish ochreous, with dorsal, subdorsal, and lateral rows of dark freckled diamond-shaped marks; head fuscous. The larvae feed on dead, decaying leaves of oak, alder and birch.
