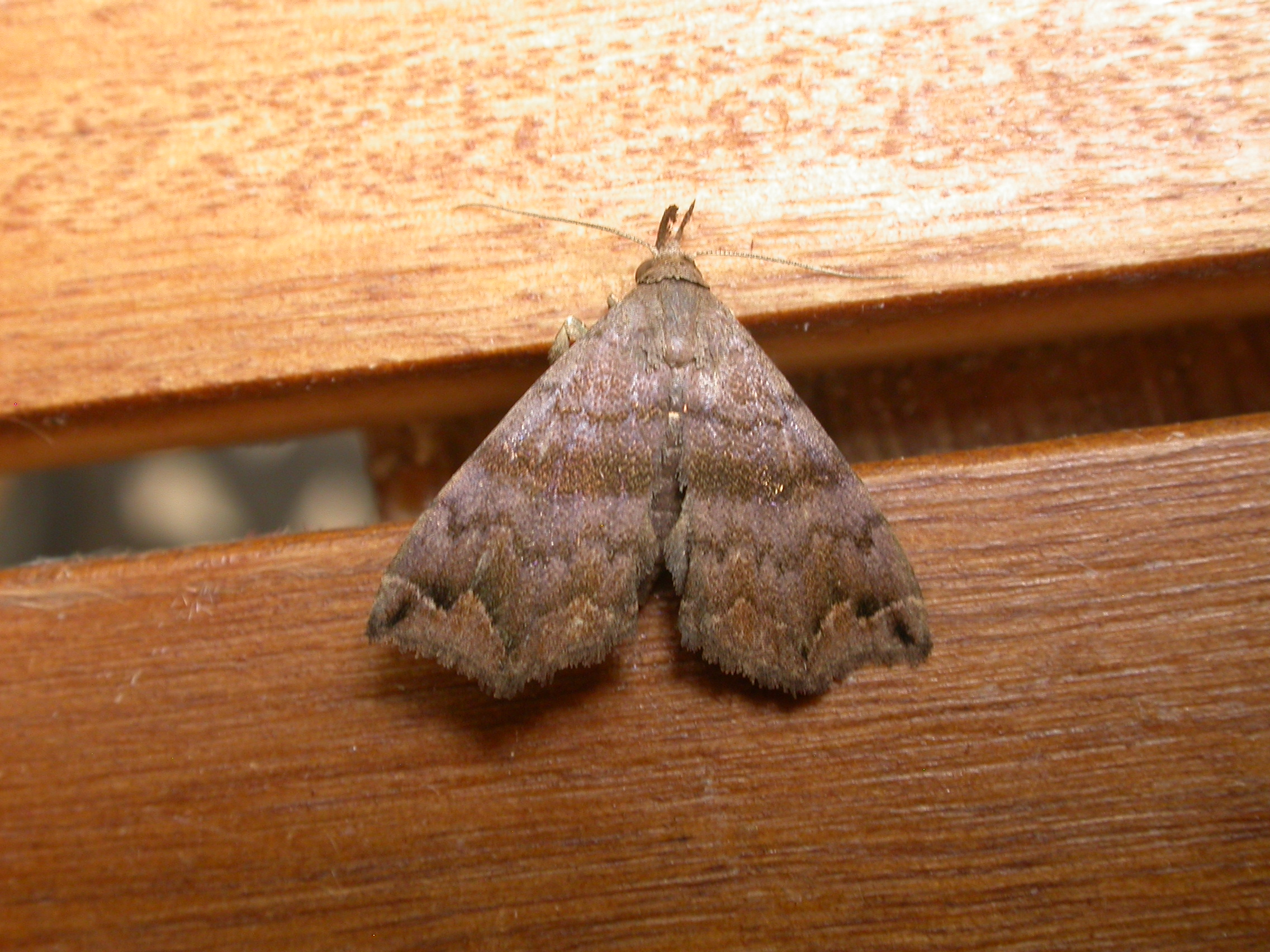

Scientific classification
- Kingdom: Animalia
- Phylum: Arthropoda
- Class: Insecta
- Order: Lepidoptera
- Superfamily: Noctuoidea
- Family: Erebidae
- Genus: Hipoepa
- Species: H. fractalis

Binomial name
- Hipoepa fractalis (Guenée, 1854)

Synonyms
- Herminia fractalis Guenée, 1854; Polypogon fractalis; Bertula raptatalis Walker, 1859; Hipoepa limieri Guillermet, 2004; Gonitis pusilla Butler, 1875; Zanclognatha invenustua Swinhoe, 1890; Zanclognatha fractalis feminina Strand, 1919; Paracolax castanea Rothschild, 1920; Hypena plebejus Rothschild, 1920; Hipoepa pusilla Butler, 1875

= Hipoepa fractalis =

Species of moth

Hipoepa fractalis is a species of moth of the family Noctuidae first described by Achille Guenée in 1854. It is found in Taiwan, China, Japan, Kenya, Korea, India, Malaysia, Nigeria, Indonesia, the Philippines, Thailand, Cape Verde, Réunion, Saudi Arabia, South Africa, Sri Lanka, Uganda, Yemen and Australia (including Queensland).

== Description ==
The wingspan is 19–34 mm. Antennae of male not knotted and contorted nor serrate. A reddish-brown moth. Forewings with postmedial line more waved and crenulate. The submarginal line angled below costa and at middle.
