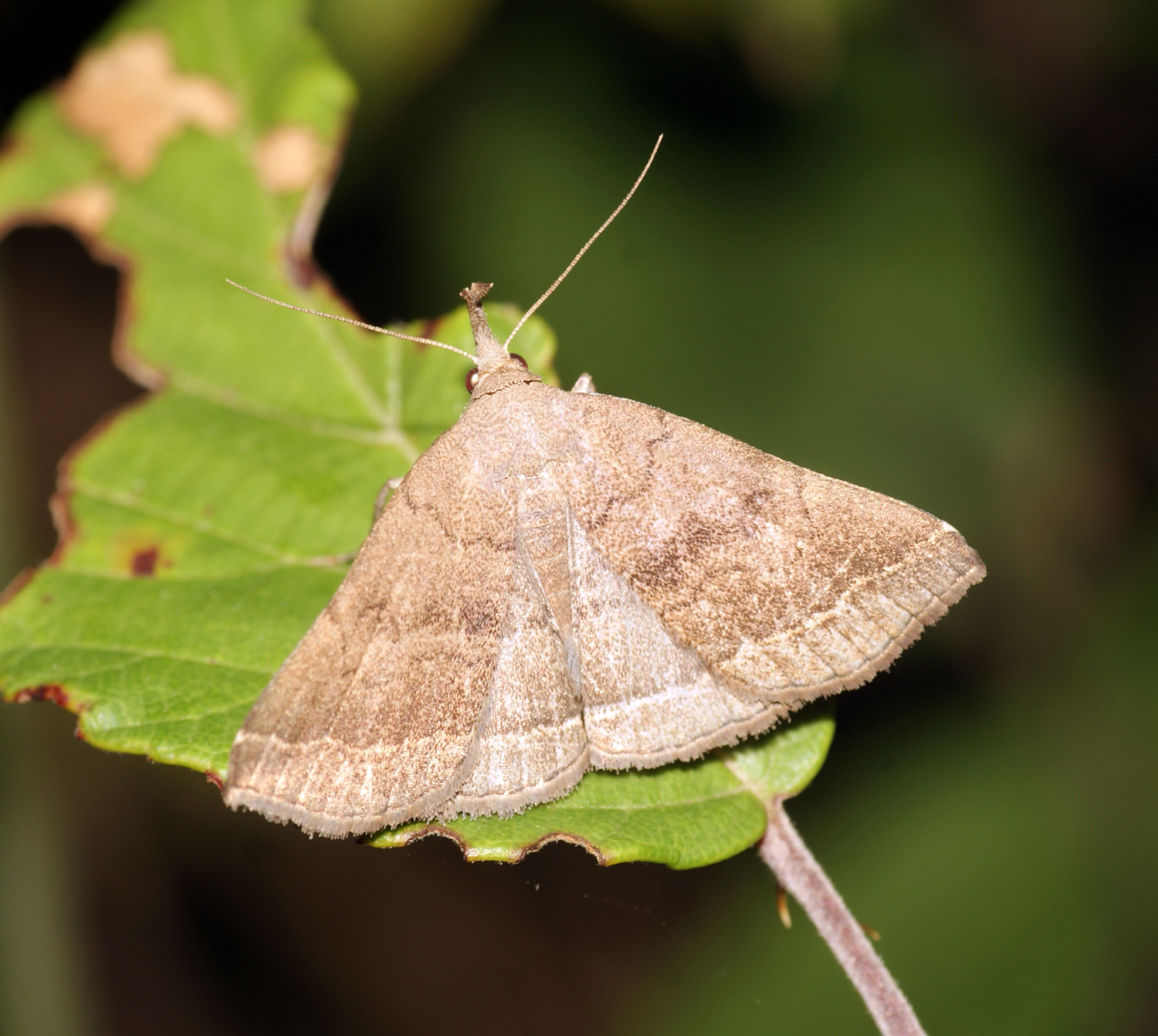

Scientific classification
- Kingdom: Animalia
- Phylum: Arthropoda
- Clade: Pancrustacea
- Class: Insecta
- Order: Lepidoptera
- Superfamily: Noctuoidea
- Family: Erebidae
- Genus: Polypogon
- Species: P. plumigeralis

Binomial name
- Polypogon plumigeralis (Hübner, 1825)

Synonyms
- Pechipogo plumigeralis Hübner, [1825]

= Polypogon plumigeralis =

Plumed fan-foot

Species of moth

Polypogon plumigeralis, the plumed fan-foot, is a species of litter moth of the family Erebidae found in Africa, Asia and Europe. It was first described by the German entomologist Jacob Hübner in 1825.

== Technical description and variation ==
H. crinalis Tr. (= barbalis Schiff., nec Cl.) [synonym] Forewing greyish ochreous, dusted with dark brown; inner and outer lines dark yellowish brown, bent below costa and somewhat sinuous; subterminal line cloudy, dark brown, nearly straight; cell mark dark, ill-defined; hindwing whitish dusted with fuscous except towards costa and apex, with obscure dark outer and subterminal lines. Larva diffusely yellow and red, sometimes wood brown; dorsal line broad, brown; a square white spot in the incisions of the segments; subdorsal lines narrow; a strong dark oblique streak at sides of each segment; head dull black. The wingspan is 24–30 millimetres (0.94–1.18 in).

== Biology ==
Adults are on wing from April to October, depending on location. There are two generations per year.

Larvae are found from August to May or June and feed on various deciduous trees, shrubs and herbs, including bramble (Rubus species), roses (Rosa species), broom (Cytisus species) and ivy (Hedera helix). It probably pupates among plant debris on the ground.

== Distribution ==
It is found in central and southern Europe, North Africa, northern Iran and Afghanistan. It is widespread in the Near East and in the Levant it is found in Lebanon, Israel and Jordan. In Great Britain it is a rare immigrant but a number of records since 1999, from New Romney, Dungeness and Rye suggest it is a probable resident in the area.
