= The Global Lepidoptera Names Index =

English searchable database maintained by the Department of Entomology

The Global Lepidoptera Names Index (LepIndex) is a searchable database maintained by the Department of Entomology at the Natural History Museum, London. It is based on card indices and scanned journals, nomenclatural catalogues and the Zoological Record. It contains most of world's Lepidoptera names published until 1981 and for some groups is up to date. As of May 2023, the site reads "Database last updated January 2018" so the current validity of the taxonomic combinations presented should be adopted with caution.

LepIndex allows anyone free internet access to:

- the zoological authority who named a butterfly or moth species
- where the original description was published
- status of the name (valid name or synonym)

It is the main source of Lepidoptera names in the Integrated Taxonomic Information System and Catalogue of Life.
