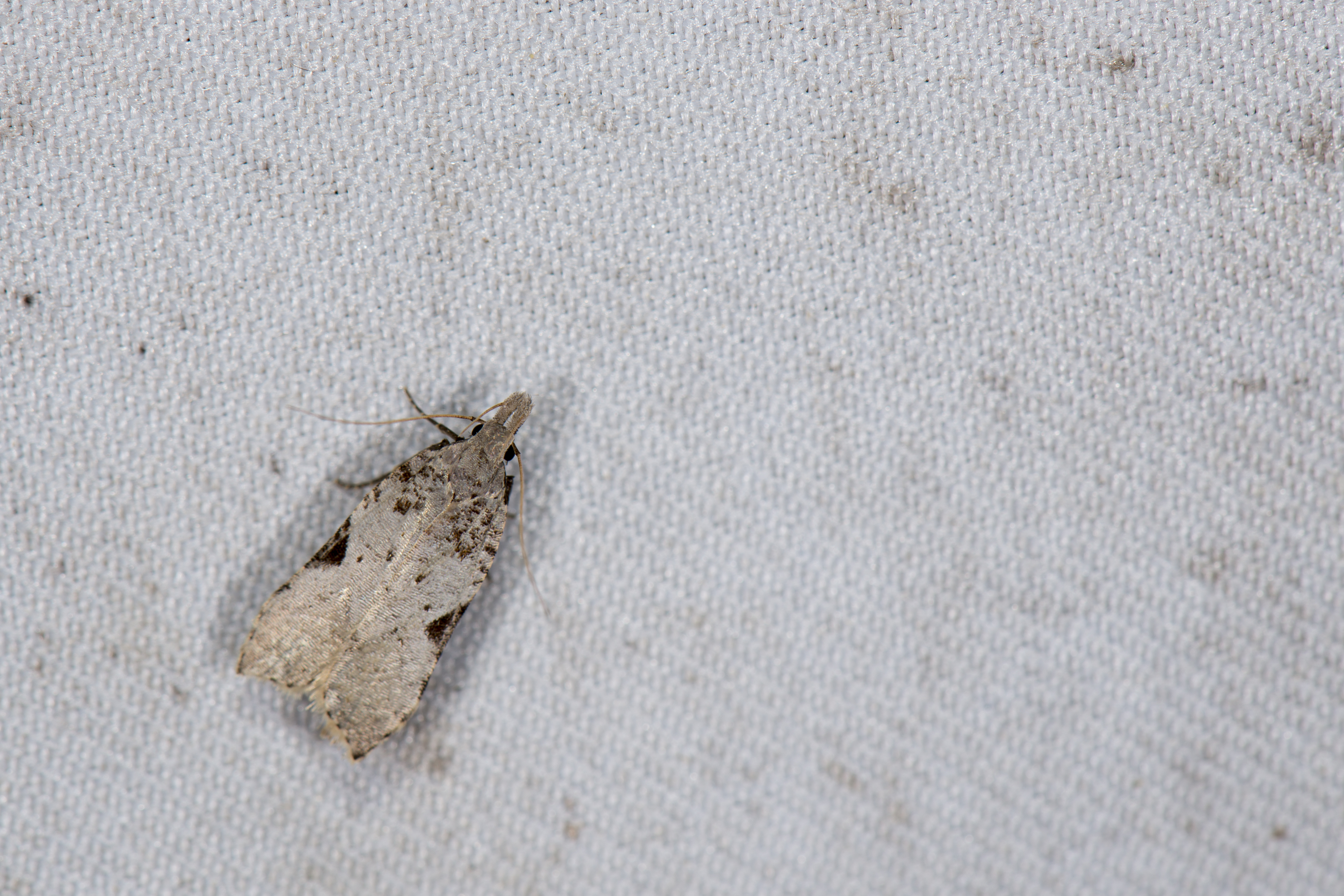

Scientific classification
- Kingdom: Animalia
- Phylum: Arthropoda
- Class: Insecta
- Order: Lepidoptera
- Family: Gelechiidae
- Genus: Dichomeris
- Species: D. angulata

Binomial name
- Dichomeris angulata Park & Hodges, 1995

= Dichomeris angulata =

Species of moth

Dichomeris angulata is a moth in the family Gelechiidae. It was described by Kyu-Tek Park and Ronald W. Hodges in 1995. It is found in Taiwan.

The length of the forewings is 10–10.5 mm. The forewings are pale brownish grey, with scattered dark brown scales in the basal one-third. There is a dark brown costal blotch. The hindwings are pale grey.
