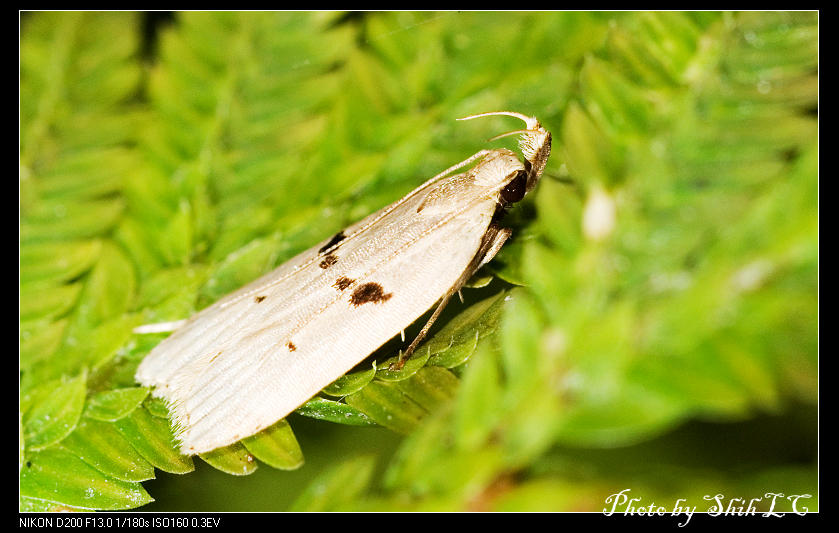

Scientific classification
- Kingdom: Animalia
- Phylum: Arthropoda
- Class: Insecta
- Order: Lepidoptera
- Family: Gelechiidae
- Genus: Dichomeris
- Species: D. loxospila

Binomial name
- Dichomeris loxospila (Meyrick, 1932)

Synonyms
- Cymotricha loxospila Meyrick, 1932

= Dichomeris loxospila =

Species of moth

Dichomeris loxospila is a moth in the family Gelechiidae. It was described by Edward Meyrick in 1932. It is found in India, China (Zhejiang, Hong Kong) and Taiwan.

The wingspan is 12.5–15 mm.
