= Dichomeris xerodes =

Scientific classification
- Domain: Eukaryota
- Kingdom: Animalia
- Phylum: Arthropoda
- Class: Insecta
- Order: Lepidoptera
- Family: Gelechiidae
- Genus: Dichomeris
- Species: D. xerodes

Binomial name
- Dichomeris xerodes Walsingham, 1911

Species of moth

Dichomeris xerodes is a moth in the family Gelechiidae. It was described by Thomas de Grey, 6th Baron Walsingham, in 1911. It is found in Mexico (Tabasco).

The wingspan is about 14.5 mm (0.57 in). The forewings are whitish ochreous, mottled and streaked with greyish fuscous and rich ferruginous. There is a small greyish fuscous spot at the base of the costa, followed by one a little darker, separated from the margin by a paler shade of the same colour which follows the costa to nearly half the wing-length, where it is diffused downwards on the upper half of an outwardly curved pale central fascia. Before this central space a large greyish fuscous patch lies near the base of the dorsum, reaching above the fold and terminated at its upper edge by a rich ferruginous streak with bright ochreous streaks above it. The pale central space is margined on its inner side by a diffused rich ferruginous patch, mixed with ochreous scales and crossing the fold and there is some similar colouring in a small spot below the costa and on the dorsum nearer to the base. Beyond the pale central space an irregular band of rich ferruginous throws out broken diverging lines of the same colour towards the apex and termen, alternating with greyish fuscous shading, which also marks the apex and termen, accumulating at the tornus. The hindwings are tawny brownish.
