= Dichomeris stratellus =

Scientific classification
- Domain: Eukaryota
- Kingdom: Animalia
- Phylum: Arthropoda
- Class: Insecta
- Order: Lepidoptera
- Family: Gelechiidae
- Genus: Dichomeris
- Species: D. stratellus

Binomial name
- Dichomeris stratellus (Walsingham, 1897)

Synonyms
- Ypsolophus stratellus Walsingham, 1897; Dichomeris stratella Walsingham, 1897

Species of moth

Dichomeris stratellus is a moth in the family Gelechiidae. It was described by Thomas de Grey, 6th Baron Walsingham, in 1897. It is found in the West Indies and Trinidad.

The wingspan is about 16 mm (0.63 in). The forewings are brownish ochreous on the costal half, while the dorsal half is dark ferruginous blending to tawny fuscous. On the pale costal half, the ground-colour blends and varies with many different tints, a shining leaden-grey suffusion along its lower edge reaching nearly to the apex is repeated near the base of the costa, while the costa itself becomes pale rusty brown rather than brownish ochreous. The dark dorsal half also varies in tone and colour, its upper edge is rich reddish ferruginous throughout, blending to dark tawny fuscous along the dorsum and becoming even darker towards the termen and tornus. There is a leaden-grey line around the apex and termen. The hindwings are dark tawny grey, semitransparent with bluish reflections towards the base.
