= Dichomeris mistipalpis =

Scientific classification
- Domain: Eukaryota
- Kingdom: Animalia
- Phylum: Arthropoda
- Class: Insecta
- Order: Lepidoptera
- Family: Gelechiidae
- Genus: Dichomeris
- Species: D. mistipalpis

Binomial name
- Dichomeris mistipalpis Walsingham, 1911

Synonyms
- Trichotaphe violaria Meyrick, 1914

Species of moth

Dichomeris mistipalpis is a moth in the family Gelechiidae. It was described by Thomas de Grey, 6th Baron Walsingham, in 1911. It is found in Panama, Brazil and Guyana.

The wingspan is about 14 mm (0.55 in). The forewings are pale ochreous, shaded with reddish brown, and streaked on the brown shades with dark steely greyish fuscous. The markings consist of an elongate costal shade, from the base nearly to the middle, in which the grey streaks predominate. There is a small patch between this and the fold, at one-fourth, with a short streak a little beyond it on the cell and a strong shade along the dorsal third, from the base to tornus, connected with a broad fascia beyond the middle, through which the dark fuscous streaks follow the venation and are faintly indicated in the pale ochreous space beyond, especially toward the tornus. The hindwings are greyish fuscous.
