= Dichomeris percnopolis =

Scientific classification
- Domain: Eukaryota
- Kingdom: Animalia
- Phylum: Arthropoda
- Class: Insecta
- Order: Lepidoptera
- Family: Gelechiidae
- Genus: Dichomeris
- Species: D. percnopolis

Binomial name
- Dichomeris percnopolis Walsingham, 1911

Species of moth

Dichomeris percnopolis is a moth in the family Gelechiidae. It was described by Thomas de Grey, 6th Baron Walsingham, in 1911. It is found in Guatemala.

The wingspan is about 22 mm (0.87 in). The forewings are stone-grey, with a slight olivaceous tinge, especially towards the termen. The base is tinned with ochreous and the costa narrowly ochreous throughout, including the costal cilia with which the terminal and apical cilia correspond, a faint paler line running through their middle. There is a quadrate dark chocolate-brown patch on the dorsum before the tornus, crossing the outer extremity of the fold, and a marginal series of seven or eight small spots of the same colour extending along the termen and around the apex. There is also some indication of two plical and three discal dots, the first discal slightly preceding the second plical the third discal scarcely preceding the second discal which is at the upper angle of the cell above it. The hindwings are tawny brownish grey.
