= Dichomeris sphyrocopa =

Scientific classification
- Kingdom: Animalia
- Phylum: Arthropoda
- Class: Insecta
- Order: Lepidoptera
- Family: Gelechiidae
- Genus: Dichomeris
- Species: D. sphyrocopa

Binomial name
- Dichomeris sphyrocopa (Meyrick, 1918)

Synonyms
- Trichotaphe sphyrocopa Meyrick, 1918

Species of moth

Dichomeris sphyrocopa is a moth in the family Gelechiidae. It was described by Edward Meyrick in 1918. It is found in French Guiana.

The wingspan is about 17 mm (0.67 in). The forewings are light pinkish ochreous, with violet reflections and a small black dot near the base in the middle, as well as two large blackish dorsal blotches, finely edged with ochreous whitish, reaching four-fifths across the wing, first irregularly subquadrate, extending on the dorsum from one-fourth to three-fifths, with the upper edge irregular convex, the second resting on the dorsum before the tornus, transverse, anteriorly projecting a large rounded lobe into the disc, posteriorly suffused, the terminal area beyond it suffused with grey. There are dark grey connected marginal dots around the posterior part of the costa and termen. The hindwings are dark grey.
