= Dichomeris polyaema =

Scientific classification
- Kingdom: Animalia
- Phylum: Arthropoda
- Class: Insecta
- Order: Lepidoptera
- Family: Gelechiidae
- Genus: Dichomeris
- Species: D. polyaema

Binomial name
- Dichomeris polyaema (Meyrick, 1923)

Synonyms
- Musurga polyaema Meyrick, 1923

Species of moth

Dichomeris polyaema is a moth in the family Gelechiidae. It was described by Edward Meyrick in 1923. It is found in Sri Lanka.

The wingspan is about 15 mm (0.59 in). The forewings are grey with the costal edge ochreous yellowish from one-third to near the apex and crimson markings, consisting of a subdorsal spot near the base and the dorsal and discal spots beyond this, one in the disc at one-fourth, one beneath the fold rather before this, two transversely placed and almost connected representing the plical and first discal stigmata, a crescentic mark on the end of the cell with the upper end produced by light suffusion anteriorly and lower connected by a sinuate streak with the dorsum towards the tornus. There is an undefined curved subterminal line of faint suffusion and small dark fuscous marginal dots or marks around the posterior part of the costa and termen. The hindwings are rather dark grey.
