= Dichomeris melanota =

Scientific classification
- Kingdom: Animalia
- Phylum: Arthropoda
- Class: Insecta
- Order: Lepidoptera
- Family: Gelechiidae
- Genus: Dichomeris
- Species: D. melanota

Binomial name
- Dichomeris melanota Walsingham, 1911

Species of moth

Dichomeris melanota is a moth in the family Gelechiidae. It was described by Thomas de Grey, 6th Baron Walsingham, in 1911. It is found in Mexico (Veracruz).

The wingspan is about 18 mm (0.71 in). The forewings are slightly lustrous, bluish black, with inconspicuous darker, dull black markings. There is an outwardly oblique streak, arising on the fold at one-third of the wing-length, but not quite reaching the costa before the middle. There are also some minute transverse striae along the dorsum, and a triangulate transverse streak, arising from the costa at three-fourths, pointing outward toward the rather suddenly depressed and angulate apex, then sharply bent inward making two adjacent points directed toward the upper angle of the cell, and again descending with a slight outward curve to the tornus, before which there is a minute ochreous marginal spot. The hindwings are dark brownish fuscous, with a pale ochreous line along the base of the more greyish fuscous cilia.
