= Dichomeris jugata =

Scientific classification
- Domain: Eukaryota
- Kingdom: Animalia
- Phylum: Arthropoda
- Class: Insecta
- Order: Lepidoptera
- Family: Gelechiidae
- Genus: Dichomeris
- Species: D. jugata

Binomial name
- Dichomeris jugata Walsingham, 1911

Species of moth

Dichomeris jugata is a moth in the family Gelechiidae. It was described by Thomas de Grey, 6th Baron Walsingham, in 1911. It is found in Mexico (Tabasco), Guatemala and Panama.

The wingspan is 13–15 mm (0.51–0.59 in). The forewings are dark purplish fuscous, with an irregular upright dull ochreous patch on the middle of the dorsum, reaching to a little above the radius, narrowly outlined with dark fuscous accompanied by a few whitish scales. Beyond this is a small dark fuscous spot at the end of the cell, narrowly bounded above by a few whitish scales, obscurely extended toward the dorsum. There is a small triangular whitish spot on the costa before the apical depression, with an outward line of thinly scattered scales extending from it to the dorsum, as well as a series of minute whitish spots preceding the fuscous cilia. The hindwings are brownish fuscous.
