= Dichomeris thrypsandra =

Scientific classification
- Kingdom: Animalia
- Phylum: Arthropoda
- Class: Insecta
- Order: Lepidoptera
- Family: Gelechiidae
- Genus: Dichomeris
- Species: D. thrypsandra

Binomial name
- Dichomeris thrypsandra (Meyrick, 1923)

Synonyms
- Trichotaphe thrypsandra Meyrick, 1923

Species of moth

Dichomeris thrypsandra is a moth in the family Gelechiidae. It was described by Edward Meyrick in 1923. It is found in Ecuador.

The wingspan is 14–15 mm (0.55–0.59 in). The forewings are dark grey, slightly speckled with yellow whitish and with a narrow light-yellowish subcostal streak from the base, becoming obsolete at about four-fifths. There are slightly oblique pale yellowish lines from the dorsum before the middle and towards the tornus, terminating in the subcostal streak, edged posteriorly by blackish suffusion. There is an indistinct transverse mark of blackish and yellow-whitish scales on the end of the cell. The hindwings of the males are yellow whitish, with long hair-scales on each side of the submedian fold, the apex suffused light grey. The female hindwings are light grey.
