= Dichomeris praealbescens =

Scientific classification
- Kingdom: Animalia
- Phylum: Arthropoda
- Class: Insecta
- Order: Lepidoptera
- Family: Gelechiidae
- Genus: Dichomeris
- Species: D. praealbescens

Binomial name
- Dichomeris praealbescens (Meyrick, 1922)

Synonyms
- Zomeutis praealbescens Meyrick, 1922

Species of moth

Dichomeris praealbescens is a moth in the family Gelechiidae. It was described by Edward Meyrick in 1922. It is found in Shanghai, China.

The wingspan is 13–14 mm (0.51–0.55 in). The forewings are whitish, closely irregularly speckled with rather dark fuscous and with a cloudy spot of dark fuscous suffusion about the fold at one-fourth. The stigmata are represented by similar spots, the plical obliquely beyond the first discal, these rather elongate, the second discal rather transverse. There is a triangular spot of dark fuscous suffusion on the costa towards the apex, edged anteriorly by a white strigula and posteriorly by a white apical spot, and with suffused white subterminal and terminal shades from these crossing the wing. The apical and terminal edge are finely dark fuscous. The hindwings are light grey.
