= Dichomeris famulata =

Scientific classification
- Kingdom: Animalia
- Phylum: Arthropoda
- Class: Insecta
- Order: Lepidoptera
- Family: Gelechiidae
- Genus: Dichomeris
- Species: D. famulata

Binomial name
- Dichomeris famulata Meyrick, 1914

Synonyms
- Dichomeris granivora Meyrick, 1932

Species of moth

Dichomeris famulata is a moth in the family Gelechiidae. It was described by Edward Meyrick in 1914. It is found in Guyana, Colombia, Brazil, Peru and Trinidad.

The wingspan is 13–14 mm (0.51–0.55 in). The forewings are whitish ochreous, with scattered dark fuscous scales and with the costa narrowly suffused with fuscous from the base to four-fifths, with more or less indicated darker dots and strigulae and dark fuscous dots beneath the fold at one-fourth, and above the fold beyond this. There is a blackish dot towards the costa before the middle. The stigmata is blackish, the first discal small, the plical somewhat obliquely beyond it. There is a series of blackish dots around the posterior part of the costa and termen. The hindwings are grey, thinly scaled and subhyaline (almost glass like) anteriorly.
