= Dichomeris hemichrysella =

Scientific classification
- Kingdom: Animalia
- Phylum: Arthropoda
- Class: Insecta
- Order: Lepidoptera
- Family: Gelechiidae
- Genus: Dichomeris
- Species: D. hemichrysella

Binomial name
- Dichomeris hemichrysella (Walker, 1863)

Synonyms
- Psecadia hemichrysella Walker, 1863; Sophronia excisorella Walker, 1864; Dichomeris macroptera Meyrick, 1914

Species of moth

Dichomeris hemichrysella is a moth in the family Gelechiidae. It was described by Francis Walker in 1863. It is found in Brazil (Amazonas), Guyana and Peru.

The wingspan is 15–17 mm. The forewings are ochreous brown, with lilac reflections, somewhat lighter towards the disc. The dorsal half is deep ferruginous, with the division rather irregular, somewhat whitish edged in the disc. The dorsal edge is suffused with dark grey towards the base. The stigmata is elongate, blackish, the plical slightly beyond the first discal, sometimes confluent with it. There are blackish streaks on veins four and five towards the termen. The hindwings are rather dark grey, lighter in the disc anteriorly.
