= Dichomeris seminata =

Scientific classification
- Kingdom: Animalia
- Phylum: Arthropoda
- Class: Insecta
- Order: Lepidoptera
- Family: Gelechiidae
- Genus: Dichomeris
- Species: D. seminata

Binomial name
- Dichomeris seminata (Meyrick, 1911)

Synonyms
- Trichotaphe seminata Meyrick, 1911

Species of moth

Dichomeris seminata is a moth in the family Gelechiidae. It was described by Edward Meyrick in 1922. It is found on the Seychelles, where it has been recorded from Aldabra.

The wingspan is 11–12 mm. The forewings are ashy fuscous, with scattered black scales, posteriorly more numerous and tending to form a series between the veins. The extreme costal edge is ochreous whitish from the base to the middle and there is a blackish dot in the disc at one-fourth. The stigmata is cloudy, blackish, the discal approximated, the plical small, rather before the first discal. There is also a cloudy ochreous-whitish dot on the costa at two-thirds and a hardly defined curved shade of black irroration (sprinkles) from this to the tornus, as well as a series of black dots around the apical part of the costa and termen. The hindwings are rather dark grey.
