= Dichomeris substratella =

Scientific classification
- Domain: Eukaryota
- Kingdom: Animalia
- Phylum: Arthropoda
- Class: Insecta
- Order: Lepidoptera
- Family: Gelechiidae
- Genus: Dichomeris
- Species: D. substratella

Binomial name
- Dichomeris substratella Walsingham, 1911

Species of moth

Dichomeris substratella is a moth in the family Gelechiidae. It was described by Thomas de Grey, 6th Baron Walsingham, in 1911. It is found in Mexico (Veracruz, Tabasco) and French Guiana.

The wingspan is 15–16 mm (0.59–0.63 in). The forewings are ochreous, with a reddish-brown suffusion along the dorsum extending to the end of the fold, with some sprinkling of the same colour beyond as well as along the costa, the basal half of which shows a shining steel bluish streak, fading outward. There are two elongate blackish spots in the fold, and between them, but nearer to the outer one, a patch of blackish scales rests on its upper edge and is followed by a small black spot at the end of the cell. There is also a geminate black spot on the termen. The hindwings are brownish grey, somewhat transparent, but not noticeably iridescent towards the base.
