= Dichomeris trissoxantha =

Scientific classification
- Kingdom: Animalia
- Phylum: Arthropoda
- Class: Insecta
- Order: Lepidoptera
- Family: Gelechiidae
- Genus: Dichomeris
- Species: D. trissoxantha

Binomial name
- Dichomeris trissoxantha (Meyrick, 1922)

Synonyms
- Strobisia trissoxantha Meyrick, 1922

Species of moth

Dichomeris trissoxantha is a moth in the family Gelechiidae. It was described by Edward Meyrick in 1922. It is found in Peru and Amazonas, Brazil.

The wingspan is 12–13 mm (0.47–0.51 in). The forewings are dark purple fuscous with a rather oblique orange streak from the costa near the base not reaching the dorsum and three moderate orange transverse fasciae, the first at one-fourth, marked with one or two dark dots, the second beyond the middle, irregularly obliquely interrupted below the middle and the third almost terminal, leaving a slender terminal streak on which are three orange dots. Alternating with these are three broad glossy dark leaden fasciae occupying the whole space except for narrow irregular streaks margining the fasciae. The hindwings are dark fuscous.
