= Dichomeris sciastes =

Scientific classification
- Domain: Eukaryota
- Kingdom: Animalia
- Phylum: Arthropoda
- Class: Insecta
- Order: Lepidoptera
- Family: Gelechiidae
- Genus: Dichomeris
- Species: D. sciastes

Binomial name
- Dichomeris sciastes Walsingham, 1911

Species of moth

Dichomeris sciastes is a moth in the family Gelechiidae. It was described by Thomas de Grey, 6th Baron Walsingham, in 1911. It is found in Mexico (Veracruz).

The wingspan is about 10 mm (0.39 in). The forewings are fawn-brown with a small elongate fuscous shade along the base of the costa, followed by a diffused triangular shade of the same colour on the middle of the costa. A less intense shade, consisting of a profuse sprinkling of fuscous scales, extends from the base of the dorsum to the end of the fold, crossing the middle of the fold almost to the upper edge of the cell, beyond this the wing is somewhat sprinkled with fuscous to the apex and termen. The plical and discal spots are scarcely distinguishable, but the first discal appears to be a little beyond and above the second plical. The hindwings are bluish grey.
