= Dichomeris macrosphena =

Scientific classification
- Kingdom: Animalia
- Phylum: Arthropoda
- Class: Insecta
- Order: Lepidoptera
- Family: Gelechiidae
- Genus: Dichomeris
- Species: D. macrosphena

Binomial name
- Dichomeris macrosphena (Meyrick, 1913)

Synonyms
- Trichotaphe macrosphena Meyrick, 1913

Species of moth

Dichomeris macrosphena is a moth in the family Gelechiidae. It was described by Edward Meyrick in 1913. It is found in São Paulo, Brazil.

The wingspan is about 18 mm (0.71 in). The forewings are dark ashy fuscous with a pale ochreous costal streak from the base to four-fifths and with some scattered dark fuscous scales, on costal edge brownish, rather wide at the base and dilated to before the middle of the disc, where it reaches more than halfway across the wing, then attenuated to the extremity, edged beneath throughout by a streak of dark brown suffusion. The second discal stigma is transverse, suffused and dark brownish and there is a slightly incurved dark brown suffused transverse line at four-fifths. The hindwings are rather dark fuscous.
