= Dichomeris ptilocompa =

Scientific classification
- Kingdom: Animalia
- Phylum: Arthropoda
- Class: Insecta
- Order: Lepidoptera
- Family: Gelechiidae
- Genus: Dichomeris
- Species: D. ptilocompa

Binomial name
- Dichomeris ptilocompa Meyrick, 1922

Species of moth

Dichomeris ptilocompa is a moth in the family Gelechiidae. It was described by Edward Meyrick in 1922. It is found in Brazil and Peru.

The wingspan is 9–11 mm (0.35–0.43 in). The forewings are leaden grey with a moderate slightly oblique blackish fascia before the middle, not reaching the costa, edged with ochreous yellow. There is a small round dark fuscous spot edged with ochreous yellow on the end of cell, well separated from the following fascia. There is a broad blackish fascia from three-fourths of the costa to the tornus, anteriorly edged by a rather oblique ochreous-yellow line indented in the middle. There are also subconfluent triangular blackish marginal dots around the apex and termen, separated anteriorly by ochreous-whitish or yellowish dots. The hindwings are dark grey.
