= Dichomeris immerita =

Scientific classification
- Kingdom: Animalia
- Phylum: Arthropoda
- Class: Insecta
- Order: Lepidoptera
- Family: Gelechiidae
- Genus: Dichomeris
- Species: D. immerita

Binomial name
- Dichomeris immerita (Meyrick, 1913)

Synonyms
- Trichotaphe immerita Meyrick, 1913

Species of moth

Dichomeris immerita is a moth in the family Gelechiidae. It was described by Edward Meyrick in 1913. It is found in Sri Lanka.

The wingspan is 17–18 mm (0.67–0.71 in). The forewings are fuscous with the costal edge whitish ochreous and with a very obscure darker oblique spot in the disc before one-third, partially edged with some whitish scales, the lower extremity representing the plical stigma. The discal stigmata is indicated by a few whitish scales and there is a slightly bisinuate very obscure darker fuscous line from a spot on the costa at two-thirds to the dorsum before the tornus, accompanied by a few pale ochreous scales. There are also some indistinct darker dots on the posterior part of the costa and termen. The hindwings are fuscous.
