= Dichomeris dignella =

Scientific classification
- Domain: Eukaryota
- Kingdom: Animalia
- Phylum: Arthropoda
- Class: Insecta
- Order: Lepidoptera
- Family: Gelechiidae
- Genus: Dichomeris
- Species: D. dignella

Binomial name
- Dichomeris dignella Walsingham, 1911

Species of moth

Dichomeris dignella is a moth in the family Gelechiidae. It was described by Thomas de Grey, 6th Baron Walsingham, in 1911. It is found in Mexico (Guerrero).

The wingspan is about 11 mm (0.43 in). The forewings are pale ochreous, sprinkled and spotted with greyish fuscous, of which there is also a distinct streak along the base of the costa. One spot is found on the upper edge of the fold at one-fifth, another on the cell at two-fifths, slightly preceded by a third beneath it, one at the end of the cell, and another on the costa at the commencement of the cilia. The sprinkling is scantily distributed, but somewhat thickened along the middle of the costa, in a transverse band along the middle, along the dorsum as far as the band, and again along the termen. The hindwings are pale bluish grey.
