= Dichomeris gorgopa =

Scientific classification
- Kingdom: Animalia
- Phylum: Arthropoda
- Class: Insecta
- Order: Lepidoptera
- Family: Gelechiidae
- Genus: Dichomeris
- Species: D. gorgopa

Binomial name
- Dichomeris gorgopa (Meyrick, 1918)

Synonyms
- Atasthalistis gorgopa Meyrick, 1918

Species of moth

Dichomeris gorgopa is a moth in the family Gelechiidae. It was described by Edward Meyrick in 1918. It is found on New Guinea.

The wingspan is 32–34 mm (1.3–1.3 in). The forewings are dark purple fuscous with a whitish basal dot in the middle, a small elongate subcostal spot at one-fifth and a large cloudy spot beneath the middle of the costa, as well as some scales along the fold towards the base, and a small cloudy spot above the fold beyond the middle. There is also an oval deep orange blotch occupying the termen, sprinkled with dark fuscous towards the anterior edge. The hindwings are blackish with a broad deep orange terminal fascia extending to below the middle of the termen.
