= Dichomeris squalens =

Scientific classification
- Kingdom: Animalia
- Phylum: Arthropoda
- Class: Insecta
- Order: Lepidoptera
- Family: Gelechiidae
- Genus: Dichomeris
- Species: D. squalens

Binomial name
- Dichomeris squalens Meyrick, 1914

Species of moth

Dichomeris squalens is a moth in the family Gelechiidae. It was described by Edward Meyrick in 1914. It is found in Guyana and Brazil.

The wingspan is 12–13 mm (0.47–0.51 in). The forewings are greyish ochreous or pale fuscous, sprinkled with darker fuscous. The markings are rather dark brown, consisting of a small spot on the fold at one-fourth, the stigmata moderate, the plical rather obliquely before the first discal. There is an additional dot more or less marked before and above the first discal and there is an irregular indistinct paler line from three-fourths of the costa to the dorsum before the tornus, somewhat curved outwards and indented above the middle, edged with brown suffusion posteriorly. There is also a series of blackish dots around the posterior part of the costa and termen. The hindwings are grey.
