= Dichomeris heteracma =

Scientific classification
- Kingdom: Animalia
- Phylum: Arthropoda
- Class: Insecta
- Order: Lepidoptera
- Family: Gelechiidae
- Genus: Dichomeris
- Species: D. heteracma

Binomial name
- Dichomeris heteracma Meyrick, 1923

Species of moth

Dichomeris heteracma is a moth in the family Gelechiidae. It was described by Edward Meyrick in 1923. It is found in Peru and Amazonas, Brazil.

The wingspan is 12–13 mm (0.47–0.51 in). The forewings are whitish ochreous with a few dark fuscous specks, more numerous along the costa. Sometimes, there is a cloudy fuscous dot in the disc at one-fourth. The stigmata are dark fuscous, the plical beneath the first discal. There is an elongate cloudy mark of dark fuscous irroration (sprinkling) on the costa at two-thirds, and more or less undefined dark fuscous irroration towards the termen, often with a cloudy dark apical spot. There is a marginal series of black dots around the posterior part of the costa and termen. The hindwings are grey.
