= Dichomeris mochlopis =

Scientific classification
- Kingdom: Animalia
- Phylum: Arthropoda
- Class: Insecta
- Order: Lepidoptera
- Family: Gelechiidae
- Genus: Dichomeris
- Species: D. mochlopis

Binomial name
- Dichomeris mochlopis (Meyrick, 1923)

Synonyms
- Cymotricha mochlopis Meyrick, 1923

Species of moth

Dichomeris mochlopis is a moth in the family Gelechiidae. It was described by Edward Meyrick in 1923. It is found in Amazonas, Brazil.

The wingspan is about 13 mm (0.51 in). The forewings are grey with an obscure dark fuscous dot in the disc at one-fourth. The stigmata are dark fuscous, the first discal forming a strong oblique mark, the second a transverse crescentic mark, the plical spot is a dot beneath the first discal. There is an obscure ochreous-whitish slightly curved and waved subterminal line, posteriorly edged with darker suffusion. There is also a marginal series of blackish crescentic dots around the apex and termen. The hindwings are dark grey.
