= Dichomeris cyanoneura =

Scientific classification
- Kingdom: Animalia
- Phylum: Arthropoda
- Class: Insecta
- Order: Lepidoptera
- Family: Gelechiidae
- Genus: Dichomeris
- Species: D. cyanoneura

Binomial name
- Dichomeris cyanoneura (Meyrick, 1922)

Synonyms
- Trichotaphe cyanoneura Meyrick, 1922

Species of moth

Dichomeris cyanoneura is a moth in the family Gelechiidae. It was described by Edward Meyrick in 1922. It is found in Guyana and Pará, Brazil.

The wingspan is 14–15 mm (0.55–0.59 in). The forewings are rather dark chocolate brown, with the costa and veins on the costal area streaked with deep violet blue and the extreme costal edge whitish. The dorsal edge and veins towards the dorsum are less distinctly streaked with violet grey and the median third from the base to the termen is variably streaked or suffused with light ochreous yellowish, leaving darker oval spots of ground colour in the disc before and beyond the middle. The hindwings are rather dark grey.
