= Dichomeris caustonota =

Scientific classification
- Kingdom: Animalia
- Phylum: Arthropoda
- Class: Insecta
- Order: Lepidoptera
- Family: Gelechiidae
- Genus: Dichomeris
- Species: D. caustonota

Binomial name
- Dichomeris caustonota (Meyrick, 1914)

Synonyms
- Trichotaphe caustonota Meyrick, 1914

Species of moth

Dichomeris caustonota is a moth in the family Gelechiidae. It was described by Edward Meyrick in 1914. It is found in Guyana.

The wingspan is about 13 mm (0.51 in). The forewings are yellow ochreous with the costal edge blackish towards the base and a moderate dark fuscous streak along the dorsum from the base to the tornus, somewhat dilated before the middle. There is a triangular dark fuscous patch extending on the costa from two-fifths to four-fifths, and reaching halfway across the wing, edged with silvery whitish. There is a roundish blotch of dark fuscous suffusion before the termen beneath the apex and there are some black terminal dots. The hindwings are dark fuscous.
