= Dichomeris prensans =

Scientific classification
- Kingdom: Animalia
- Phylum: Arthropoda
- Class: Insecta
- Order: Lepidoptera
- Family: Gelechiidae
- Genus: Dichomeris
- Species: D. prensans

Binomial name
- Dichomeris prensans Meyrick, 1922

Species of moth

Dichomeris prensans is a moth in the family Gelechiidae. It was described by Edward Meyrick in 1922. It is found in Peru and the Brazilian states of Pará and Amazonas.

The wingspan is 12–13 mm (0.47–0.51 in). The forewings are brownish ochreous, often violet tinged, sometimes obscurely strigulated with ferruginous brown. There is a streak of dark brown suffusion along the costa from the base to five-sixths. The dorsal half is suffused with dark violet brownish, variably mixed or strigulated by dark ferruginous fuscous, the stigmata sometimes perceptible as ferruginous-brown spots, the plical beyond the first discal. There is also a variable irregular narrow terminal fascia of dark brown suffusion. The hindwings are dark grey.
