= Dichomeris porphyrogramma =

Scientific classification
- Domain: Eukaryota
- Kingdom: Animalia
- Phylum: Arthropoda
- Class: Insecta
- Order: Lepidoptera
- Family: Gelechiidae
- Genus: Dichomeris
- Species: D. porphyrogramma

Binomial name
- Dichomeris porphyrogramma (Meyrick, 1914)

Synonyms
- Trichotaphe porphyrogramma Meyrick, 1914; Trichotaphe porphyrogramma – Meyrick, 1922 (redescription)

Species of moth

Dichomeris porphyrogramma is a moth in the family Gelechiidae. It was described by Edward Meyrick in 1914.

== Distribution ==
It is found in Guyana, Peru, and Pará, Brazil.

== Description ==
The wingspan is 11–13 mm (0.43–0.51 in). The forewings are pale ochreous, suffused with bright deep ferruginous or ferruginous brown. All veins and the costa are marked with purple-blue or violet-grey streaks. The hindwings are dark grey, lighter anteriorly.
