= Dichomeris varronia =

Scientific classification
- Domain: Eukaryota
- Kingdom: Animalia
- Phylum: Arthropoda
- Class: Insecta
- Order: Lepidoptera
- Family: Gelechiidae
- Genus: Dichomeris
- Species: D. varronia

Binomial name
- Dichomeris varronia Busck, 1913

Species of moth

Dichomeris varronia is a moth in the family Gelechiidae. It was described by August Busck in 1913. It is found in Panama and Guyana.

The wingspan is about 19 mm. The forewings are dark blackish fuscous with a light ochreous brown costal area from the base to the apical fifth, broadest near the base, where it occupies half of the width of the wing and attenuated toward the apex. This light area is edged on its basal half by a deep blackish brown area, which is gradually suffused into the ground color dorsally, but which toward the costal light area is sharply drawn as an undulating edge. There is a submarginal series of small ochreous dashes around the apical and terminal edge. The hindwings are dark brownish fuscous, lighter toward the base.

The larvae feed on Varronia curissavaca.
