= Dichomeris nessica =

Scientific classification
- Domain: Eukaryota
- Kingdom: Animalia
- Phylum: Arthropoda
- Class: Insecta
- Order: Lepidoptera
- Family: Gelechiidae
- Genus: Dichomeris
- Species: D. nessica

Binomial name
- Dichomeris nessica Walsingham, 1911

Species of moth

Dichomeris nessica is a moth in the family Gelechiidae. It was described by Thomas de Grey, 6th Baron Walsingham, in 1911. It is found in Panama.

The wingspan is about 21 mm (0.83 in). At the base of the forewings is a large greyish cinereous patch, which, after following the fold nearly to its middle is attenuate upward and outward to the commencement of the costal cilia. The remainder of the wing is of varying shades of dark chestnut-brown, containing a small black spot on the fold, and a larger circular spot of the same colour at the end of the cell. There is a faint shade, rising from before the tornus, running nearly parallel with the termen and vanishing half-way between the discal spot and the apex. The hindwings are greyish fuscous.
