= Dichomeris hemeropa =

Scientific classification
- Kingdom: Animalia
- Phylum: Arthropoda
- Class: Insecta
- Order: Lepidoptera
- Family: Gelechiidae
- Genus: Dichomeris
- Species: D. hemeropa

Binomial name
- Dichomeris hemeropa (Meyrick, 1923)

Synonyms
- Ilingotis hemeropa Meyrick, 1923

Species of moth

Dichomeris hemeropa is a moth in the family Gelechiidae. It was described by Edward Meyrick in 1923. It is found in Amazonas, Brazil.

The wingspan is 9–11 mm (0.35–0.43 in). The forewings are light yellow ochreous, beyond the subterminal line tinged with brownish. The costal edge is black towards the base, the plical and second discal stigmata moderate, black and pale edged. There is a faint pale curved subterminal line from two-thirds of the costa to the tornus, preceded on the costa by a fuscous mark. There are also marginal fuscous pale-edged dots around the posterior part of the costa and termen. The hindwings are grey.
