= Dichomeris malthacopa =

Scientific classification
- Kingdom: Animalia
- Phylum: Arthropoda
- Class: Insecta
- Order: Lepidoptera
- Family: Gelechiidae
- Genus: Dichomeris
- Species: D. malthacopa

Binomial name
- Dichomeris malthacopa (Meyrick, 1922)

Synonyms
- Taphrosaris malthacopa Meyrick, 1922

Species of moth

Dichomeris malthacopa is a moth in the family Gelechiidae. It was described by Edward Meyrick in 1922. It is found in French Guiana and Amazonas, Brazil.

The wingspan is about 20 mm (0.79 in). The forewings are rather dark violet ashy grey with an irregular transverse blackish blotch in the disc before the middle, which is sometimes divided into two. The upper half is somewhat mixed with brown and the lower half occupied, except for the lateral margins, by a brownish-ochreous spot. There are two blackish dots transversely placed on the end of the cell, sometimes with some pale yellowish scales between these. The hindwings are rather dark grey.
