= Dichomeris levigata =

Scientific classification
- Kingdom: Animalia
- Phylum: Arthropoda
- Class: Insecta
- Order: Lepidoptera
- Family: Gelechiidae
- Genus: Dichomeris
- Species: D. levigata

Binomial name
- Dichomeris levigata (Meyrick, 1913)

Synonyms
- Carbatina levigata Meyrick, 1913

Species of moth

Dichomeris levigata is a moth in the family Gelechiidae. It was described by Edward Meyrick in 1913. It is found in Sri Lanka.

The wingspan is 12–13 mm (0.47–0.51 in). The forewings are pale yellow ochreous with a very small dark fuscous spot on the base of the costa, and an elongate dark fuscous mark at two-thirds, the costa between these is obscurely dotted with dark fuscous. The stigmata are dark fuscous, the plical rather large, slightly before the first discal. There is also a narrow rather dark purplish-fuscous terminal fascia which is widest at the apex and narrowed to the tornus. The hindwings are grey.
