= Dichomeris ampycota =

Scientific classification
- Kingdom: Animalia
- Phylum: Arthropoda
- Class: Insecta
- Order: Lepidoptera
- Family: Gelechiidae
- Genus: Dichomeris
- Species: D. ampycota

Binomial name
- Dichomeris ampycota (Meyrick, 1913)

Synonyms
- Holaxyra ampycota Meyrick, 1913

Species of moth

Dichomeris ampycota is a moth of the family Gelechiidae. It was described by Edward Meyrick in 1913. It is known from Sri Lanka.

The wingspan is about 26 mm. The forewings are purplish fuscous, suffused with ferruginous brownish except towards the costa anteriorly. The costal edge and cilia are ferruginous from three-fourths to the apex and the stigmata are obscure and dark fuscous, each marked with a grey-whitish dot. The discal is approximated and the plical smaller, rather before the first discal. There is also a spot of dark fuscous suffusion on the dorsum rather beyond the second discal. The hindwings are grey.
