= Dichomeris chartaria =

Scientific classification
- Kingdom: Animalia
- Phylum: Arthropoda
- Class: Insecta
- Order: Lepidoptera
- Family: Gelechiidae
- Genus: Dichomeris
- Species: D. chartaria

Binomial name
- Dichomeris chartaria (Meyrick, 1913)

Synonyms
- Trichotaphe chartaria Meyrick, 1913; Mythographa chartaria

Species of moth

Dichomeris chartaria is a moth in the family Gelechiidae. It was described by Edward Meyrick in 1913. It is found in Sri Lanka.

The wingspan is 16–17 mm (0.63–0.67 in). The forewings are ochreous whitish, slightly infuscated (darkened) except towards the costa. The stigmata are black, ringed with white, the first discal large, round, the plical moderate, obliquely beyond it, sometimes united with it, the second discal small. There is a dark fuscous mark on the costa at two-thirds, and two or three small subconfluent marks towards the apex. The hindwings are rather dark grey.
