= Dichomeris cinctella =

Scientific classification
- Kingdom: Animalia
- Phylum: Arthropoda
- Class: Insecta
- Order: Lepidoptera
- Family: Gelechiidae
- Genus: Dichomeris
- Species: D. cinctella

Binomial name
- Dichomeris cinctella (Walker, 1864)

Synonyms
- Gelechia cinctella Walker, 1864; Cymotricha subrutila Meyrick, 1923

Species of moth

Dichomeris cinctella is a moth in the family Gelechiidae. It was described by Francis Walker in 1864. It is found in Peru and Amazonas, Brazil.

The wingspan is about 16 mm. The forewings are reddish brown. The stigmata are very small, white, partly edged blackish, the plical slightly before the first discal. There is a small spot of grey suffusion on the costa at three-fourths and a very fine whitish curved-subsinuate line from two-thirds of the costa to the dorsum before the tornus. There are also black marginal dots around the posterior part of the costa and termen. The hindwings are dark grey.
