= Dichomeris instans =

Scientific classification
- Kingdom: Animalia
- Phylum: Arthropoda
- Class: Insecta
- Order: Lepidoptera
- Family: Gelechiidae
- Genus: Dichomeris
- Species: D. instans

Binomial name
- Dichomeris instans Meyrick, 1923

Species of moth

Dichomeris instans is a moth in the family Gelechiidae. It was described by Edward Meyrick in 1923. It is found in Peru and Amazonas, Brazil.

The wingspan is 10–11 mm (0.39–0.43 in). The forewings are ochreous sprinkled with dark fuscous and with the costa irrorated (sprinkled) with dark fuscous from the base to a dark fuscous elongate mark at two-thirds. There are indistinct dark fuscous dots obliquely placed above and below the fold. The stigmata are blackish, the plical rather obliquely before the first discal and there is an undefined almost terminal fascia of dark fuscous suffusion rather broader above, leaving the edge ochreous with black dots. The hindwings are dark grey.
