= Dichomeris latescens =

Scientific classification
- Domain: Eukaryota
- Kingdom: Animalia
- Phylum: Arthropoda
- Class: Insecta
- Order: Lepidoptera
- Family: Gelechiidae
- Genus: Dichomeris
- Species: D. latescens

Binomial name
- Dichomeris latescens (Walsingham, 1911)

Synonyms
- Paranoea latescens Walsingham, 1911

Species of moth

Dichomeris latescens is a moth in the family Gelechiidae. It was described by Thomas de Grey, 6th Baron Walsingham, in 1911. It is found in Mexico (Veracruz, Tabasco).

The wingspan is about 8 mm (0.31 in). The forewings are cream-colour, with a slight yellowish tinge. A pale chestnut-brown costal blotch beyond the middle is followed by a series of small chestnut-brown dots around the apex and termen, at the base of the creamy yellowish cilia. A faint chestnut dot lies at the end of the cell. The hindwings are pale greyish cinereous.
