= Dichomeris xuthostola =

Scientific classification
- Domain: Eukaryota
- Kingdom: Animalia
- Phylum: Arthropoda
- Class: Insecta
- Order: Lepidoptera
- Family: Gelechiidae
- Genus: Dichomeris
- Species: D. xuthostola

Binomial name
- Dichomeris xuthostola Walsingham, 1911

Species of moth

Dichomeris xuthostola is a moth in the family Gelechiidae. It was described by Thomas de Grey, 6th Baron Walsingham, in 1911. It is found in Mexico (Tabasco).

The wingspan is about 14.5 mm (0.57 in). The forewings are reddish ochreous, with a broad diffused ferruginous shade along the dorsum from the base, embracing the outer half of the fold, a slight shade of the same colour on the outer half of the costa reaching to the apex. There is a single brownish fuscous dot at the end of the cell and a narrow broken shade of the same colour around the apex and termen at the base of the ochreous cilia. The hindwings are brownish grey.
