= Dichomeris aequata =

Scientific classification
- Kingdom: Animalia
- Phylum: Arthropoda
- Class: Insecta
- Order: Lepidoptera
- Family: Gelechiidae
- Genus: Dichomeris
- Species: D. aequata

Binomial name
- Dichomeris aequata Meyrick, 1914

Species of moth

Dichomeris aequata is a moth in the family Gelechiidae. It was described by Edward Meyrick in 1914. It is found in Guyana and Brazil.

The wingspan is 13–16 mm (0.51–0.63 in). The forewings are light greyish ochreous, irrorated (sprinkled) with fuscous except towards the costa anteriorly. There is a small blackish dot on the base of the costa and the stigmata are moderate, blackish and obscurely whitish edged, the plical beneath the first discal. There is a faint pale greyish-ochreous slightly curved shade from three-fourths of the costa to the dorsum before the tornus and there is a row of blackish dots around the apex and termen. The hindwings are rather dark grey.
