= Dichomeris miltophragma =

Scientific classification
- Kingdom: Animalia
- Phylum: Arthropoda
- Class: Insecta
- Order: Lepidoptera
- Family: Gelechiidae
- Genus: Dichomeris
- Species: D. miltophragma

Binomial name
- Dichomeris miltophragma Meyrick, 1922

Species of moth

Dichomeris miltophragma is a moth in the family Gelechiidae. It was described by Edward Meyrick in 1922. It is found in the Brazilian states of Pará and Amazonas and in Peru.

The wingspan is 13–16 mm (0.51–0.63 in). The forewings are leaden grey, with three oblique vermillion-red blotches edged by dark brown red and then whitish, first on the base of the dorsum, the second from beneath the costa at one-fourth to near the middle of the dorsum, the third traversing the disc at two-thirds. There is an irregular-edged ferruginous line margined by pale ochreous running around the posterior two-fifths of the costa and termen. The hindwings are dark grey.
