= Dichomeris barnesiella =

Scientific classification
- Kingdom: Animalia
- Phylum: Arthropoda
- Clade: Pancrustacea
- Class: Insecta
- Order: Lepidoptera
- Family: Gelechiidae
- Genus: Dichomeris
- Species: D. barnesiella

Binomial name
- Dichomeris barnesiella (Busck, 1907)

Synonyms
- Trichotaphe barnesiella Busck, 1907

Species of moth

Dichomeris barnesiella is a moth in the family Gelechiidae. It was described by August Busck in 1907. It is found in Mexico and Arizona.

The wingspan is about 17 mm. The costal half of the forewings is light creamy yellow in contrast to the dorsal half, which is purplish brown. These two colours are sharply divided in the middle of the wing. The yellow costal part, which reaches nearly but not quite to the apex, has two slight serrations projecting into the dark dorsal part. The hindwings are dark fuscous. Adults are on the wing in May and September.
