= Dichomeris contrita =

Scientific classification
- Kingdom: Animalia
- Phylum: Arthropoda
- Class: Insecta
- Order: Lepidoptera
- Family: Gelechiidae
- Genus: Dichomeris
- Species: D. contrita

Binomial name
- Dichomeris contrita (Meyrick, 1922)

Synonyms
- Pachysaris contrita Meyrick, 1922

Species of moth

Dichomeris contrita is a moth in the family Gelechiidae. It was described by Edward Meyrick in 1922. It is found in Guyana and Pará, Brazil.

The wingspan is about 19 mm (0.75 in). The forewings are dark iron grey. The stigmata are small and dark fuscous, the plical beneath the first discal and an additional dot beneath the second discal. The hindwings are rather light grey, the scales farinose with a darker grey streak along the upper part of the termen and a short basal pecten of whitish-ochreous scales, as well as a slight one on the lower margin of the cell.
