= Dichomeris leucocosma =

Scientific classification
- Kingdom: Animalia
- Phylum: Arthropoda
- Class: Insecta
- Order: Lepidoptera
- Family: Gelechiidae
- Genus: Dichomeris
- Species: D. leucocosma

Binomial name
- Dichomeris leucocosma (Meyrick, 1916)

Synonyms
- Trichotaphe leucocosma Meyrick, 1916

Species of moth

Dichomeris leucocosma is a moth in the family Gelechiidae. It was described by Edward Meyrick in 1916. It is found in Malawi.

The wingspan is about 11 mm. The forewings are pale lilac grey irregularly mixed with dark fuscous, especially posteriorly. There is a narrow suffused ochreous-white costal streak from the base, broadest at the base, terminating in a triangular ochreous-white patch at two-thirds reaching halfway across the wing. There is a white dot representing the plical stigma. The hindwings are grey.
