= Dichomeris thermophaea =

Scientific classification
- Kingdom: Animalia
- Phylum: Arthropoda
- Class: Insecta
- Order: Lepidoptera
- Family: Gelechiidae
- Genus: Dichomeris
- Species: D. thermophaea

Binomial name
- Dichomeris thermophaea (Meyrick, 1923)

Synonyms
- Sirogenes thermophaea Meyrick, 1923

Species of moth

Dichomeris thermophaea is a moth in the family Gelechiidae. It was described by Edward Meyrick in 1923. It is found in Brazil and Peru.

The wingspan is about 11 mm (0.43 in). The forewings are ochreous-brown. The stigmata are rather large, blackish, obscurely pale edged, the plical slightly before the first discal. There is a faint curved ochreous line from three-fourths of the costa to the tornus and dark fuscous marginal dots around the posterior part of the costa and termen. The hindwings are dark grey.
