= Dichomeris saturata =

Scientific classification
- Kingdom: Animalia
- Phylum: Arthropoda
- Class: Insecta
- Order: Lepidoptera
- Family: Gelechiidae
- Genus: Dichomeris
- Species: D. saturata

Binomial name
- Dichomeris saturata Meyrick, 1923

Species of moth

Dichomeris saturata is a moth in the family Gelechiidae. It was described by Edward Meyrick in 1923. It is found in Pará, Brazil.

The wingspan is about 15 mm (0.59 in). The forewings are light reddish ochreous suffusedly mixed ferruginous and with the basal half of the costa suffused with ferruginous with a blue gloss. The base of the dorsum is dark grey. The stigmata is blackish, the plical and first discal rather large, the plical rather posterior, these two connected by irregular grey suffusion, the second discal smaller. There is some blackish speckling towards the termen. The hindwings are dark grey.
