= Dichomeris thalamopa =

Scientific classification
- Kingdom: Animalia
- Phylum: Arthropoda
- Class: Insecta
- Order: Lepidoptera
- Family: Gelechiidae
- Genus: Dichomeris
- Species: D. thalamopa

Binomial name
- Dichomeris thalamopa Meyrick, 1922

Species of moth

Dichomeris thalamopa is a moth in the family Gelechiidae. It was described by Edward Meyrick in 1922. It is found in Amazonas, Brazil.

The wingspan is about 10 mm (0.39 in). The forewings are glossy deep purple with a small orange mark surrounded with black towards the costa near the base and a slightly curved irregular black antemedian fascia edged on each side with orange-black-edged lines. The apical area is wholly blackish beyond an orange transverse line at four-fifths, making a strong rounded loop inwards in the disc, its costal edge whitish. The hindwings are dark fuscous.
