= Dichomeris serena =

Scientific classification
- Kingdom: Animalia
- Phylum: Arthropoda
- Class: Insecta
- Order: Lepidoptera
- Family: Gelechiidae
- Genus: Dichomeris
- Species: D. serena

Binomial name
- Dichomeris serena (Meyrick, 1909)

Synonyms
- Trichotaphe serena Meyrick, 1909

Species of moth

Dichomeris serena is a moth in the family Gelechiidae. It was described by Edward Meyrick in 1909. It is found in Bolivia.

The wingspan is about 17 mm (0.67 in). The forewings are yellowish brown, the costal edge sometimes pale yellowish. The stigmata are dark fuscous, with the plical obliquely beyond the first discal, the second discal larger and indistinctly edged with pale yellowish. There are some indistinct pale yellowish dots on the posterior part of the costa and termen. The hindwings are blackish grey.
