= Dichomeris zonata =

Scientific classification
- Kingdom: Animalia
- Phylum: Arthropoda
- Class: Insecta
- Order: Lepidoptera
- Family: Gelechiidae
- Genus: Dichomeris
- Species: D. zonata

Binomial name
- Dichomeris zonata H.-H. Li & H.-J. Wang, 1997

Species of moth

Dichomeris zonata is a moth in the family Gelechiidae. It was described by Hou-Hun Li and Hong-Jian Wang in 1997. It is found in China (Hong Kong, Yunnan).

The wingspan is 17–19 mm. The forewings are ochreous brown with the basal half of the costal margin and basal three-fourths of the posterior margin brown. There is a brown spot in the cell at the base and at the end and there are two oblique spots at the middle. There are at least three generations per year with adults recorded on wing in February and from April to November.

The larvae feed on Dalbergia benthamii.
