= Dichomeris pyrrhopis =

Scientific classification
- Kingdom: Animalia
- Phylum: Arthropoda
- Class: Insecta
- Order: Lepidoptera
- Family: Gelechiidae
- Genus: Dichomeris
- Species: D. pyrrhopis

Binomial name
- Dichomeris pyrrhopis (Meyrick, 1922)

Synonyms
- Prophoraula pyrrhopis Meyrick, 1922

Species of moth

Dichomeris pyrrhopis is a moth in the family Gelechiidae. It was described by Edward Meyrick in 1922. It is found in Amazonas, Brazil.

The wingspan is 12–16 mm (0.47–0.63 in). The forewings are ferruginous orange, in males sprinkled with ferruginous and the costa suffused with ferruginous. The hindwings in males are dark fuscous, towards the base more or less variably suffused orange. The hindwings of the females are greyish orange.
