= Dichomeris rurigena =

Scientific classification
- Kingdom: Animalia
- Phylum: Arthropoda
- Class: Insecta
- Order: Lepidoptera
- Family: Gelechiidae
- Genus: Dichomeris
- Species: D. rurigena

Binomial name
- Dichomeris rurigena (Meyrick, 1914)

Synonyms
- Pachysaris rurigena Meyrick, 1914

Species of moth

Dichomeris rurigena is a moth in the family Gelechiidae. It was described by Edward Meyrick in 1914. It is found in Guyana.

The wingspan is 17–19 mm (0.67–0.75 in). The forewings are brown with a small blackish spot at the base of the costa. The discal stigmata is minute, dark fuscous, with a faint hardly paler slightly bent shade from four-fifths of the costa to the tornus. There is also a terminal series of minute dark fuscous dots. The hindwings are rather dark grey.
