= Dichomeris fluctuans =

Scientific classification
- Kingdom: Animalia
- Phylum: Arthropoda
- Class: Insecta
- Order: Lepidoptera
- Family: Gelechiidae
- Genus: Dichomeris
- Species: D. fluctuans

Binomial name
- Dichomeris fluctuans (Meyrick, 1923)

Synonyms
- Cymotricha fluctuans Meyrick, 1923

Species of moth

Dichomeris fluctuans is a moth in the family Gelechiidae. It was described by Edward Meyrick in 1923. It is found in Peru.

The wingspan is about 14 mm (0.55 in). The forewings are violet brown, the costal edge light yellowish. The stigmata are hardly darker, small, the plical beneath the first discal. There are two cloudy ochreous-yellowish dots on the costa towards the apex and indistinct darker marginal dots around the apex and termen. The hindwings are dark fuscous.
