= Dichomeris thalpodes =

Scientific classification
- Kingdom: Animalia
- Phylum: Arthropoda
- Class: Insecta
- Order: Lepidoptera
- Family: Gelechiidae
- Genus: Dichomeris
- Species: D. thalpodes

Binomial name
- Dichomeris thalpodes Meyrick, 1922

Species of moth

Dichomeris thalpodes is a moth in the family Gelechiidae. It was described by Edward Meyrick in 1922. It is found in Peru and Pará, Brazil.

The wingspan is 12–13 mm (0.47–0.51 in). The forewings are orange, subtly streaked with ferruginous along the veins, and feature broader areas of deep ferruginous shading along the dorsum and the back two-thirds of the costa, with additional deep ferruginous streaks present in the cell. There are rather irregular dark reddish-fuscous marginal dots around the apex and termen. The hindwings are dark grey.
