= Dichomeris triplagella =

Scientific classification
- Kingdom: Animalia
- Phylum: Arthropoda
- Clade: Pancrustacea
- Class: Insecta
- Order: Lepidoptera
- Family: Gelechiidae
- Genus: Dichomeris
- Species: D. triplagella

Binomial name
- Dichomeris triplagella (Walker, 1864)

Synonyms
- Gelechia triplagella Walker, 1864

Species of moth

Dichomeris triplagella is a moth in the family Gelechiidae. It was described by Francis Walker in 1864. It is found in Amazonas, Brazil.

Adults are fawn coloured, the forewings thickly speckled with blackish and mostly tinged with chalybeous (steel blue). There are three brown patches, the first and second irregularly triangular, the first resting on the interior border before the middle and the second resting on the costa beyond the middle. The third forms a submarginal band. The hindwings are cupreous.
