= Dichomeris rhizogramma =

Scientific classification
- Kingdom: Animalia
- Phylum: Arthropoda
- Class: Insecta
- Order: Lepidoptera
- Family: Gelechiidae
- Genus: Dichomeris
- Species: D. rhizogramma

Binomial name
- Dichomeris rhizogramma (Meyrick, 1923)

Synonyms
- Ageliarchis rhizogramma Meyrick, 1923

Species of moth

Dichomeris rhizogramma is a moth in the family Gelechiidae. It was described by Edward Meyrick in 1923. It is found in Brazil.

The wingspan is 16–17 mm (0.63–0.67 in). The forewings are fuscous, sprinkled with blackish and irregularly streaked with dark fuscous suffusion and black sprinkling between the veins and on the fold. There is a rather narrow dark fuscous fascia around the apex and termen. The hindwings are dark grey.
