= Dichomeris sumptella =

Scientific classification
- Kingdom: Animalia
- Phylum: Arthropoda
- Class: Insecta
- Order: Lepidoptera
- Family: Gelechiidae
- Genus: Dichomeris
- Species: D. sumptella

Binomial name
- Dichomeris sumptella (Walker, 1864)

Synonyms
- Gelechia sumptella Walker, 1864

Species of moth

Dichomeris sumptella is a moth in the family Gelechiidae. It was described by Francis Walker in 1864. It is found in Peru and Amazonas, Brazil.

Adults are bluish black, the forewings with two broad dark ferruginous bands, the first before the middle bordered with cinereous on each side. There is a ferruginous-cinereous bordered discal dot, contiguous to the second band, which is bordered with cinereous on the inner side. The marginal line is black and consists of connected dots. The hindwings are dark cupreous brown.
