= Dichomeris horiodes =

Scientific classification
- Kingdom: Animalia
- Phylum: Arthropoda
- Class: Insecta
- Order: Lepidoptera
- Family: Gelechiidae
- Genus: Dichomeris
- Species: D. horiodes

Binomial name
- Dichomeris horiodes Meyrick, 1923

Species of moth

Dichomeris horiodes is a moth in the family Gelechiidae. It was described by Edward Meyrick in 1923. It is found in Amazonas, Brazil.

The wingspan is about 10 mm (0.39 in). The forewings are pale ochreous with the costa slenderly suffused with grey from the base to two-thirds. The dorsal two-fifths is obscurely suffused with grey from near the base to the tornus and the discal stigmata are black, the first somewhat elongate. There is a terminal streak of dark grey suffusion from the apex to near the tornus. The hindwings are light grey.
