= Dichomeris tepens =

Scientific classification
- Kingdom: Animalia
- Phylum: Arthropoda
- Class: Insecta
- Order: Lepidoptera
- Family: Gelechiidae
- Genus: Dichomeris
- Species: D. tepens

Binomial name
- Dichomeris tepens (Meyrick, 1923)

Synonyms
- Cymotricha tepens Meyrick, 1923

Species of moth

Dichomeris tepens is a moth in the family Gelechiidae. It was described by Edward Meyrick in 1923. It is found on Madagascar.

The wingspan is about 17 mm (0.67 in). The forewings are ferruginous ochreous with a cloudy ferruginous-fuscous dot in the disc at one-fourth. The stigmata is moderate, cloudy, ferruginous fuscous, the plical somewhat before the first discal, the second discal transverse. The hindwings are light grey.
