= Dichomeris collina =

Scientific classification
- Kingdom: Animalia
- Phylum: Arthropoda
- Class: Insecta
- Order: Lepidoptera
- Family: Gelechiidae
- Genus: Dichomeris
- Species: D. collina

Binomial name
- Dichomeris collina (Meyrick, 1914)

Synonyms
- Pachysaris collina Meyrick, 1914

Species of moth

Dichomeris collina is a moth in the family Gelechiidae. It was described by Edward Meyrick in 1914. It is found in Peru.

The wingspan is about 18 mm (0.71 in). The forewings are fuscous with a small spot of dark fuscous suffusion on the base of the costa. The stigmata are very small, obscure, dark fuscous, with the plical rather obliquely beyond the first discal. The hindwings are dark fuscous, becoming subhyaline (almost glass like) towards the costa.
