= Dichomeris cachrydias =

Scientific classification
- Kingdom: Animalia
- Phylum: Arthropoda
- Class: Insecta
- Order: Lepidoptera
- Family: Gelechiidae
- Genus: Dichomeris
- Species: D. cachrydias

Binomial name
- Dichomeris cachrydias Meyrick, 1914

Species of moth

Dichomeris cachrydias is a moth in the family Gelechiidae. It was described by Edward Meyrick in 1914. It is found in Guyana and Brazil.

The wingspan is 11–12 mm (0.43–0.47 in). The forewings are dark fuscous, each more or less surrounded with fuscous suffusion coalescing with a broad streak of fuscous suffusion extending above the fold to the tornus. There is an undefined patch of fuscous suffusion towards the costa about three-fourths, and a streak along the termen. The hindwings are grey.
