= Dichomeris isoclera =

Scientific classification
- Kingdom: Animalia
- Phylum: Arthropoda
- Class: Insecta
- Order: Lepidoptera
- Family: Gelechiidae
- Genus: Dichomeris
- Species: D. isoclera

Binomial name
- Dichomeris isoclera (Meyrick, 1913)

Synonyms
- Holaxyra isoclera Meyrick, 1913

Species of moth

Dichomeris isoclera is a moth in the family Gelechiidae. It was described by Edward Meyrick in 1913. It is found in Sri Lanka.

The wingspan is 17–18 mm (0.67–0.71 in). The forewings are fuscous, finely sprinkled with whitish. The stigmata are rather large, blackish, with the plical somewhat beyond the first discal, and an additional dot beneath and slightly before the second discal. The hindwings are grey.
