= Dichomeris amauropis =

Scientific classification
- Kingdom: Animalia
- Phylum: Arthropoda
- Class: Insecta
- Order: Lepidoptera
- Family: Gelechiidae
- Genus: Dichomeris
- Species: D. amauropis

Binomial name
- Dichomeris amauropis (Meyrick, 1923)

Synonyms
- Cymotricha amauropis Meyrick, 1923

Species of moth

Dichomeris amauropis is a moth in the family Gelechiidae. It was described by Edward Meyrick in 1923. It is found in Peru.

The wingspan is about 20 mm (0.79 in). The forewings are fuscous. The stigmata is small, dark fuscous, the plical beneath the first discal, edged posteriorly by a whitish dot. There is a marginal series of dark fuscous dots around the apex and termen. The hindwings are dark grey.
