= Dichomeris antisticha =

Scientific classification
- Kingdom: Animalia
- Phylum: Arthropoda
- Class: Insecta
- Order: Lepidoptera
- Family: Gelechiidae
- Genus: Dichomeris
- Species: D. antisticha

Binomial name
- Dichomeris antisticha Meyrick, 1926

Species of moth

Dichomeris antisticha is a moth in the family Gelechiidae. It was described by Edward Meyrick in 1926. It is found in Costa Rica.

The wingspan is about 14 mm. The forewings are dark bronzy fuscous, slightly speckled with whitish. The stigmata are cloudy, obscurely darker, the plical nearly beneath the first discal, the second discal preceded by some whitish scales. There are indistinct dark fuscous marginal dots around the posterior part of the costa and termen. The hindwings are light bluish grey.
