= Dichomeris brachymetra =

Scientific classification
- Kingdom: Animalia
- Phylum: Arthropoda
- Class: Insecta
- Order: Lepidoptera
- Family: Gelechiidae
- Genus: Dichomeris
- Species: D. brachymetra

Binomial name
- Dichomeris brachymetra Meyrick, 1923

Species of moth

Dichomeris brachymetra is a moth in the family Gelechiidae. It was described by Edward Meyrick in 1923. It is found in Peru.

The wingspan is about 12 mm (0.47 in). The forewings are pale ochreous, irregularly irrorated (sprinkled) with grey, and the costal edge from the base to beyond the middle whitish, very shortly strigulated with dark fuscous. The plical and first discal stigmata are dark fuscous, the plical somewhat anterior. The hindwings are light grey.
