= Dichomeris obsepta =

Scientific classification
- Kingdom: Animalia
- Phylum: Arthropoda
- Class: Insecta
- Order: Lepidoptera
- Family: Gelechiidae
- Genus: Dichomeris
- Species: D. obsepta

Binomial name
- Dichomeris obsepta (Meyrick, 1935)

Synonyms
- Orsodytis obsepta Meyrick, 1935

Species of moth

Dichomeris obsepta is a moth in the family Gelechiidae. It was described by Edward Meyrick in 1935. It is found in China (Hong Kong, Anhui, Gansu, Guangdong, Henan, Hubei, Hunan, Jiangsu, Jiangxi, Sichuan, Zhejiang).

The wingspan is 15–18.5 mm (0.59–0.73 in).
