= Dichomeris directa =

Scientific classification
- Kingdom: Animalia
- Phylum: Arthropoda
- Class: Insecta
- Order: Lepidoptera
- Family: Gelechiidae
- Genus: Dichomeris
- Species: D. directa

Binomial name
- Dichomeris directa (Meyrick, 1912)

Synonyms
- Trichotaphe directa Meyrick, 1912

Species of moth

Dichomeris directa is a moth in the family Gelechiidae. It was described by Edward Meyrick in 1912. It is found in Venezuela.

The wingspan is 14–16 mm (0.55–0.63 in). The forewings are fuscous grey with the extreme costal edge whitish anteriorly. The stigmata is rather large, blackish, the plical directly beneath the first discal. The hindwings are rather dark grey.
