= Dichomeris fida =

Scientific classification
- Kingdom: Animalia
- Phylum: Arthropoda
- Class: Insecta
- Order: Lepidoptera
- Family: Gelechiidae
- Genus: Dichomeris
- Species: D. fida

Binomial name
- Dichomeris fida Meyrick, 1923

Species of moth

Dichomeris fida is a moth in the family Gelechiidae. It was described by Edward Meyrick in 1923. It is found in Pará, Brazil.

The wingspan is about 9 mm (0.35 in). The forewings are fuscous. The stigmata is black, the plical beneath the first discal. There is a cloudy pale ochreous dot on the costa at three-fourths and minute marginal dots around the costa posteriorly and the termen. The hindwings are grey.
