= Dichomeris contentella =

Scientific classification
- Kingdom: Animalia
- Phylum: Arthropoda
- Class: Insecta
- Order: Lepidoptera
- Family: Gelechiidae
- Genus: Dichomeris
- Species: D. contentella

Binomial name
- Dichomeris contentella (Walker, 1864)

Synonyms
- Gelechia contentella Walker, 1864

Species of moth

Dichomeris contentella is a moth in the family Gelechiidae. It was described by Francis Walker in 1864. It is found on Borneo.

Adults are slaty cinereous, the forewings with two blackish discal points and a straight exterior line, as well as a fawn-coloured streak along the apical part of the costa. The marginal dots are black. The hindwings are brownish cinereous.
