= Dichomeris pyrrhoschista =

Scientific classification
- Kingdom: Animalia
- Phylum: Arthropoda
- Class: Insecta
- Order: Lepidoptera
- Family: Gelechiidae
- Genus: Dichomeris
- Species: D. pyrrhoschista

Binomial name
- Dichomeris pyrrhoschista (Meyrick, 1934)

Synonyms
- Brachmia pyrrhoschista Meyrick, 1934

Species of moth

Dichomeris pyrrhoschista is a moth in the family Gelechiidae. It was described by Edward Meyrick in 1934. It is found in Taiwan and Sichuan, China.

The length of the forewings is 7–9 mm (0.28–0.35 in). The hindwings are dark grey.
