= Dichomeris physocoma =

Scientific classification
- Kingdom: Animalia
- Phylum: Arthropoda
- Class: Insecta
- Order: Lepidoptera
- Family: Gelechiidae
- Genus: Dichomeris
- Species: D. physocoma

Binomial name
- Dichomeris physocoma Meyrick, 1926

Species of moth

Dichomeris physocoma is a moth in the family Gelechiidae. It was described by Edward Meyrick in 1926. It is found in Sierra Leone.

The wingspan is about 13 mm (0.51 in). The forewings are violet grey with a small whitish-ochreous spot on the costa before three-fourths and minute blackish marginal dots around the apical part of the costa and termen. The hindwings are rather dark grey.
