= Dichomeris badiolineariella =

Scientific classification
- Kingdom: Animalia
- Phylum: Arthropoda
- Class: Insecta
- Order: Lepidoptera
- Family: Gelechiidae
- Genus: Dichomeris
- Species: D. badiolineariella

Binomial name
- Dichomeris badiolineariella Ponomarenko & Ueda, 2004

Species of moth

Dichomeris badiolineariella is a moth in the family Gelechiidae. It was described by Ponomarenko and Ueda in 2004. It is found in Thailand.

The wingspan is about 17.5 mm (0.69 in).

== Etymology ==
The species name is derived from Latin badi- (meaning castaneous) and lineari (meaning linear).
