= Dichomeris orientis =

Scientific classification
- Kingdom: Animalia
- Phylum: Arthropoda
- Class: Insecta
- Order: Lepidoptera
- Family: Gelechiidae
- Genus: Dichomeris
- Species: D. orientis

Binomial name
- Dichomeris orientis Park & Hodges, 1995

Species of moth

Dichomeris orientis is a moth in the family Gelechiidae. It was described by Kyu-Tek Park and Ronald W. Hodges in 1995. It is found in Taiwan, Hong Kong, southern China (Hainan, Guangdong , Yunnan), and Cambodia.

The length of the forewings is 6–6.5 mm; the wingspan is 10–12 mm.
