= Dichomeris resignata =

Scientific classification
- Kingdom: Animalia
- Phylum: Arthropoda
- Class: Insecta
- Order: Lepidoptera
- Family: Gelechiidae
- Genus: Dichomeris
- Species: D. resignata

Binomial name
- Dichomeris resignata Meyrick, 1929

Synonyms
- Gaesa praeducta Meyrick, 1929

Species of moth

Dichomeris resignata is a moth in the family Gelechiidae. It was described by Edward Meyrick in 1929. It is found on the Bismarck Archipelago and the New Hebrides in the South Pacific Ocean .

The wingspan is 10–15 mm (0.39–0.59 in).
