= Dichomeris terracocta =

Scientific classification
- Domain: Eukaryota
- Kingdom: Animalia
- Phylum: Arthropoda
- Class: Insecta
- Order: Lepidoptera
- Family: Gelechiidae
- Genus: Dichomeris
- Species: D. terracocta

Binomial name
- Dichomeris terracocta (Walsingham, 1911)

Species of moth

Dichomeris terracocta is a moth in the family Gelechiidae. It was described by Thomas de Grey, 6th Baron Walsingham, in 1911. Found in Panama, its wingspan is about 15 millimetres (0.59 in), the forewings are clay-red, and the hindwings are reddish grey.
