= Dichomeris oxycarpa =

Scientific classification
- Kingdom: Animalia
- Phylum: Arthropoda
- Class: Insecta
- Order: Lepidoptera
- Family: Gelechiidae
- Genus: Dichomeris
- Species: D. oxycarpa

Binomial name
- Dichomeris oxycarpa (Meyrick, 1935)

Synonyms
- Musurga oxycarpa Meyrick, 1935

Species of moth

Dichomeris oxycarpa is a moth in the family Gelechiidae. It was described by Edward Meyrick in 1935. It is found in China (Hong Kong, Hainan) and Taiwan.

The wingspan is 17–19 mm.
