= Dichomeris tenextrema =

Scientific classification
- Kingdom: Animalia
- Phylum: Arthropoda
- Clade: Pancrustacea
- Class: Insecta
- Order: Lepidoptera
- Family: Gelechiidae
- Genus: Dichomeris
- Species: D. tenextrema

Binomial name
- Dichomeris tenextrema H.-H. Li, Zhen & Mey, 2013

Species of moth

Dichomeris tenextrema is a moth in the family Gelechiidae. It was described by Hou-Hun Li, Hui Zhen and Wolfram Mey in 2013. It is found in Kenya.

The wingspan is about 12.5 mm.
