= Dichomeris ligulacea =

Scientific classification
- Kingdom: Animalia
- Phylum: Arthropoda
- Clade: Pancrustacea
- Class: Insecta
- Order: Lepidoptera
- Family: Gelechiidae
- Genus: Dichomeris
- Species: D. ligulacea

Binomial name
- Dichomeris ligulacea H.-H. Li, Zhen & Mey, 2013

Species of moth

Dichomeris ligulacea is a moth in the family Gelechiidae. It was described by Hou-Hun Li, Hui Zhen and Wolfram Mey in 2013. It is found in Malawi.

The wingspan is about 19 mm.
