= Dichomeris amphicosma =

Scientific classification
- Kingdom: Animalia
- Phylum: Arthropoda
- Class: Insecta
- Order: Lepidoptera
- Family: Gelechiidae
- Genus: Dichomeris
- Species: D. amphicosma

Binomial name
- Dichomeris amphicosma (Meyrick, 1930)

Synonyms
- Cymotricha amphicosma Meyrick, 1930

Species of moth

Dichomeris amphicosma is a moth in the family Gelechiidae. It was described by Edward Meyrick in 1930. It is found in Pará, Brazil.

The wingspan is about 17 mm (0.67 in).
