= Dichomeris balioella =

Scientific classification
- Kingdom: Animalia
- Phylum: Arthropoda
- Class: Insecta
- Order: Lepidoptera
- Family: Gelechiidae
- Genus: Dichomeris
- Species: D. balioella

Binomial name
- Dichomeris balioella Ponomarenko & Ueda, 2004

Species of moth

Dichomeris balioella is a moth in the family Gelechiidae. It was described by Ponomarenko and Ueda in 2004. It is found in Thailand.

The wingspan is about 12 mm (0.47 in).

== Etymology ==
The species name is derived from Greek bali- (meaning the spotted).
