= Dichomeris atricornis =

Scientific classification
- Kingdom: Animalia
- Phylum: Arthropoda
- Class: Insecta
- Order: Lepidoptera
- Family: Gelechiidae
- Genus: Dichomeris
- Species: D. atricornis

Binomial name
- Dichomeris atricornis (Meyrick, 1934)

Synonyms
- Trichotaphe atricornis Meyrick, 1934; Dichomeris atricordis; Trichotaphe atricordis

Species of moth

Dichomeris atricornis is a moth in the family Gelechiidae. It was described by Edward Meyrick in 1934. It is found in Sierra Leone.
