= Dichomeris acmodeta =

Scientific classification
- Domain: Eukaryota
- Kingdom: Animalia
- Phylum: Arthropoda
- Class: Insecta
- Order: Lepidoptera
- Family: Gelechiidae
- Genus: Dichomeris
- Species: D. acmodeta

Binomial name
- Dichomeris acmodeta (Meyrick, 1931)

Synonyms
- Hyperecta acmodeta Meyrick, 1931

Species of moth

Dichomeris acmodeta is a moth of the family Gelechiidae. It was described by Edward Meyrick in 1931. It is known from Myanmar.
