= Dichomeris ochreofimbriella =

Scientific classification
- Kingdom: Animalia
- Phylum: Arthropoda
- Class: Insecta
- Order: Lepidoptera
- Family: Gelechiidae
- Genus: Dichomeris
- Species: D. ochreofimbriella

Binomial name
- Dichomeris ochreofimbriella (Viette, 1968)

Synonyms
- Trichotaphe ochreofimbriella Viette, 1968

Species of moth

Dichomeris ochreofimbriella is a moth in the family Gelechiidae. It was described by Pierre Viette in 1968. It is found in Madagascar.
