= Dichomeris parallelosa =

Scientific classification
- Kingdom: Animalia
- Phylum: Arthropoda
- Class: Insecta
- Order: Lepidoptera
- Family: Gelechiidae
- Genus: Dichomeris
- Species: D. parallelosa

Binomial name
- Dichomeris parallelosa Park & Ponomarenko, 1998

Species of moth

Dichomeris parallelosa is a moth in the family Gelechiidae. It was described by Kyu-Tek Park and Margarita Gennadievna Ponomarenko in 1998. It is found in Thailand.

The wingspan is 11-11.5 mm.
