= Dichomeris ceramoxantha =

Scientific classification
- Kingdom: Animalia
- Phylum: Arthropoda
- Class: Insecta
- Order: Lepidoptera
- Family: Gelechiidae
- Genus: Dichomeris
- Species: D. ceramoxantha

Binomial name
- Dichomeris ceramoxantha (Meyrick, 1929)

Synonyms
- Trichotaphe ceramoxantha Meyrick, 1929

Species of moth

Dichomeris ceramoxantha is a moth in the family Gelechiidae. It was described by Edward Meyrick in 1929. It is found in Colombia.
