= Dichomeris symmetrica =

Scientific classification
- Kingdom: Animalia
- Phylum: Arthropoda
- Class: Insecta
- Order: Lepidoptera
- Family: Gelechiidae
- Genus: Dichomeris
- Species: D. symmetrica

Binomial name
- Dichomeris symmetrica Park & Hodges, 1995

Species of moth

Dichomeris symmetrica is a moth of the family Gelechiidae. It was described by Kyu-Tek Park and Ronald W. Hodges in 1995. It is found in Taiwan.

The length of the forewings is 6–6.2 mm.
