= Dichomeris solatrix =

Scientific classification
- Kingdom: Animalia
- Phylum: Arthropoda
- Clade: Pancrustacea
- Class: Insecta
- Order: Lepidoptera
- Family: Gelechiidae
- Genus: Dichomeris
- Species: D. solatrix

Binomial name
- Dichomeris solatrix Hodges, 1986

Species of moth

Dichomeris solatrix is a moth in the family Gelechiidae. It was described by Ronald W. Hodges in 1986. It is found in North America, where it has been recorded from the Peña Blanca Canyon in Arizona.
