= Dichomeris vadonella =

Scientific classification
- Kingdom: Animalia
- Phylum: Arthropoda
- Class: Insecta
- Order: Lepidoptera
- Family: Gelechiidae
- Genus: Dichomeris
- Species: D. vadonella

Binomial name
- Dichomeris vadonella Viette, 1955

Species of moth

Dichomeris vadonella is a moth in the family Gelechiidae. It was described by Viette in 1955. It is found in Madagascar.

The wingspan is about 17 mm. The forewings are dark brown with a black point. The hindwings are uniform brownish-black.
