= Dichomeris lushanae =

Scientific classification
- Kingdom: Animalia
- Phylum: Arthropoda
- Class: Insecta
- Order: Lepidoptera
- Family: Gelechiidae
- Genus: Dichomeris
- Species: D. lushanae

Binomial name
- Dichomeris lushanae Park & Hodges, 1995

Species of moth

Dichomeris lushanae is a moth of the family Gelechiidae. It was described by Kyu-Tek Park and Ronald W. Hodges in 1995. It is found in Taiwan.

The length of the forewings is 9.5–10 mm.
