= Dichomeris ebenosella =

Scientific classification
- Kingdom: Animalia
- Phylum: Arthropoda
- Class: Insecta
- Order: Lepidoptera
- Family: Gelechiidae
- Genus: Dichomeris
- Species: D. ebenosella

Binomial name
- Dichomeris ebenosella (Viette, 1968)

Synonyms
- Trichotaphe ebenosella Viette, 1968

Species of moth

Dichomeris ebenosella is a moth in the family Gelechiidae. It was described by Pierre Viette in 1968. It is found in Madagascar.
