= Dichomeris tongoborella =

Scientific classification
- Kingdom: Animalia
- Phylum: Arthropoda
- Class: Insecta
- Order: Lepidoptera
- Family: Gelechiidae
- Genus: Dichomeris
- Species: D. tongoborella

Binomial name
- Dichomeris tongoborella (Viette, 1958)

Synonyms
- Holaxyra tongoborella Viette, 1958

Species of moth

Dichomeris tongoborella is a moth in the family Gelechiidae. It was described by Pierre Viette in 1958. It is found in Madagascar.
