= Dichomeris aculata =

Scientific classification
- Kingdom: Animalia
- Phylum: Arthropoda
- Clade: Pancrustacea
- Class: Insecta
- Order: Lepidoptera
- Family: Gelechiidae
- Genus: Dichomeris
- Species: D. aculata

Binomial name
- Dichomeris aculata Park, 2001

Species of moth

Dichomeris aculata is a moth in the family Gelechiidae. It was described by Kyu-Tek Park in 2001. It is found in Taiwan.

The length of the forewings is about 6.5 mm.
