= Dichomeris eosella =

Scientific classification
- Kingdom: Animalia
- Phylum: Arthropoda
- Class: Insecta
- Order: Lepidoptera
- Family: Gelechiidae
- Genus: Dichomeris
- Species: D. eosella

Binomial name
- Dichomeris eosella (Viette, 1956)

Synonyms
- Holaxyra eosella Viette, 1956

Species of moth

Dichomeris eosella is a moth in the family Gelechiidae. It was described by Pierre Viette in 1956. It is found in Madagascar.
