= Dichomeris asodes =

Scientific classification
- Kingdom: Animalia
- Phylum: Arthropoda
- Class: Insecta
- Order: Lepidoptera
- Family: Gelechiidae
- Genus: Dichomeris
- Species: D. asodes

Binomial name
- Dichomeris asodes Meyrick, 1939

Species of moth

Dichomeris asodes is a moth of the family Gelechiidae. It was described by Edward Meyrick in 1939. It is known from Java, Indonesia.

The larvae feed on "sogok tsenteng".
