= Dichomeris bucinaria =

Scientific classification
- Kingdom: Animalia
- Phylum: Arthropoda
- Clade: Pancrustacea
- Class: Insecta
- Order: Lepidoptera
- Family: Gelechiidae
- Genus: Dichomeris
- Species: D. bucinaria

Binomial name
- Dichomeris bucinaria Park, 1996

Species of moth

Dichomeris bucinaria is a moth in the family Gelechiidae. It was described by Kyu-Tek Park in 1996. It is found in Taiwan.
