= Dichomeris paulianella =

Scientific classification
- Kingdom: Animalia
- Phylum: Arthropoda
- Clade: Pancrustacea
- Class: Insecta
- Order: Lepidoptera
- Family: Gelechiidae
- Genus: Dichomeris
- Species: D. paulianella

Binomial name
- Dichomeris paulianella Viette, 1956

Species of moth

Dichomeris paulianella is a moth in the family Gelechiidae. It was described by Viette in 1956. It is found in Madagascar.
