= Dichomeris anisospila =

Scientific classification
- Kingdom: Animalia
- Phylum: Arthropoda
- Class: Insecta
- Order: Lepidoptera
- Family: Gelechiidae
- Genus: Dichomeris
- Species: D. anisospila

Binomial name
- Dichomeris anisospila Meyrick, 1934

Species of moth

Dichomeris anisospila is a moth of the family Gelechiidae. It was described by Edward Meyrick in 1934. It is known from Guangdong province in China.
