= Dichomeris antizella =

Scientific classification
- Kingdom: Animalia
- Phylum: Arthropoda
- Class: Insecta
- Order: Lepidoptera
- Family: Gelechiidae
- Genus: Dichomeris
- Species: D. antizella

Binomial name
- Dichomeris antizella Viette, 1986

Species of moth

Dichomeris antizella is a moth in the family Gelechiidae. It was described by Viette in 1986. It is found in Madagascar.

The wingspan is about 14 mm.
