= Dichomeris alogista =

Scientific classification
- Kingdom: Animalia
- Phylum: Arthropoda
- Class: Insecta
- Order: Lepidoptera
- Family: Gelechiidae
- Genus: Dichomeris
- Species: D. alogista

Binomial name
- Dichomeris alogista Meyrick, 1935

Species of moth

Dichomeris alogista is a moth of the family Gelechiidae. It was described by Edward Meyrick in 1935. It is known to be found in Hunan province in China.
