= Dichomeris crossospila =

Scientific classification
- Kingdom: Animalia
- Phylum: Arthropoda
- Class: Insecta
- Order: Lepidoptera
- Family: Gelechiidae
- Genus: Dichomeris
- Species: D. crossospila

Binomial name
- Dichomeris crossospila Meyrick, 1933

Species of moth

Dichomeris crossospila is a moth in the family Gelechiidae. It was described by Edward Meyrick in 1933. It is found in Costa Rica.
