= Dichomeris monorbella =

Scientific classification
- Kingdom: Animalia
- Phylum: Arthropoda
- Class: Insecta
- Order: Lepidoptera
- Family: Gelechiidae
- Genus: Dichomeris
- Species: D. monorbella

Binomial name
- Dichomeris monorbella Viette, 1988

Species of moth

Dichomeris monorbella is a moth in the family Gelechiidae. It was described by Viette in 1988. It is found in Madagascar.
