= Dichomeris zymotella =

Scientific classification
- Kingdom: Animalia
- Phylum: Arthropoda
- Class: Insecta
- Order: Lepidoptera
- Family: Gelechiidae
- Genus: Dichomeris
- Species: D. zymotella

Binomial name
- Dichomeris zymotella Viette, 1956

Species of moth

Dichomeris zymotella is a moth in the family Gelechiidae. It was described by Viette in 1956. It is found in Madagascar.
