= List of moths of India (Gelechiidae) =

This is a list of moths of the family Gelechiidae that are found in India. It also acts as an index to the species articles and forms part of the full List of moths of India.

- Acribologa citharista (Meyrick, 1913)
- Acribologa malacodes (Meyrick, 1910)
- Amblypalpis olivierella Ragonot, 1886
- Anacampsis rivalis Meyrick, 1918
- Anacampsis specularis (Meyrick, 1918)
- Anarsia acerata Meyrick, 1913
- Anarsia acrotoma Meyrick, 1913
- Anarsia altercata Meyrick, 1918
- Anarsia didymopa Meyrick, 1916
- Anarsia ephippias Meyrick, 1908
- Anarsia epotias Meyrick, 1916
- Anarsia idioptila Meyrick, 1916
- Anarsia isogona Meyrick, 1913
- Anarsia melanoplecta Meyrick, 1914
- Anarsia omoptila Meyrick, 1918
- Anarsia parkae Rose and Pathania, 2003
- Anarsia patulella (Walker, 1864)
- Anarsia phortica Meyrick, 1913
- Anarsia reciproca Meyrick, 1920
- Anarsia renukaensis Rose and Pathania, 2003
- Anarsia sagittaria Meyrick, 1914
- Anarsia sagmatica Meyrick, 1916
- Anarsia tanyharensis Rose and Pathania, 2003
- Anarsia tegumentus Rose and Pathania, 2003
- Anarsia triaenota Meyrick, 1913
- Anarsia triglypta Meyrick, 1933
- Anarsia valvata Rose and Pathania, 2003
- Anarsia veruta Meyrick, 1918
- Apatetris caecivaga Meyrick, 1928
- Apatetris leucoglypta Meyrick, 1918
- Apethistis consummata (Meyrick, 1923)
- Apethistis inspersa (Meyrick, 1921)
- Apethistis insulsa (Meyrick, 1914)
- Apethistis officiosa (Meyrick, 1918)
- Apethistis purificata Meyrick, 1931
- Apethistis sitiens (Meyrick, 1918)
- Apethistis superans Meyrick, 1926
- Aphanostola atripalpis Meyrick, 1931
- Aphanostola intercepta Meyrick, 1932
- Aproaerema modicella Deventer, 1904
- Aristotelia agatha Meyrick, 1918
- Aristotelia articulata Meyrick, 1918
- Aristotelia asthenodes Meyrick, 1923
- Aristotelia aulacopis Meyrick, 1923
- Aristotelia brochodesma Meyrick, 1908
- Aristotelia citrocosma Meyrick, 1908
- Aristotelia defixa Meyrick, 1929
- Aristotelia galeotis Meyrick, 1908
- Aristotelia incitata Meyrick, 1918
- Aristotelia ingravata Meyrick, 1918
- Aristotelia juvenilis Meyrick, 1929
- Aristotelia leptocentra Meyrick, 1912
- Aristotelia leucophanta Meyrick, 1908
- Aristotelia oxythectis Meyrick, 1929
- Aristotelia palamota Meyrick, 1926
- Aristotelia panchromatica (Meyrick, 1926)
- Aristotelia paraleuca Meyrick, 1929
- Aristotelia repudiata Meyrick, 1923
- Aristotelia resinosa Meyrick, 1918
- Aristotelia stipella (Hübner, 1796)
- Aristotelia thalamitis Meyrick, 1908
- Aristotelia zetetica Meyrick, 1934
- Aroga peperistis (Meyrick, 1926)
- Aulidiotis phoxopterella (Snellen, 1903)
- Autosticha acharacta Meyrick, 1918
- Autosticha ansata Meyrick, 1931
- Autosticha auxodelta Meyrick, 1916
- Autosticha conciliata Meyrick, 1918
- Autosticha encycota Meyrick, 1922
- Autosticha enervata Meyrick, 1929
- Autosticha exemplaris Meyrick, 1916
- Autosticha spilochorda Meyrick, 1916
- Autosticha stagmatopis Meyrick, 1923
- Autosticha tetrapeda Meyrick, 1908
- Battaristis specularis Meyrick, 1914
- Brachmia arotraea (Meyrick, 1894)
- Brachmia carphodes (Meyrick, 1908)
- Brachmia cenchritis Meyrick, 1911
- Brachmia consummata Meyrick, 1923
- Brachmia convolvuli (Walsingham, 1908)
- Brachmia craterospila Meyrick, 1923
- Brachmia custos Meyrick, 1911
- Brachmia dryotyphla Meyrick, 1937
- Brachmia engrapta Meyrick, 1918
- Brachmia idiastis Meyrick, 1916
- Brachmia inspersa Meyrick, 1921
- Brachmia lochistis Meyrick, 1911
- Brachmia macroscopa Meyrick, 1932
- Brachmia officiosa Meyrick, 1918
- Brachmia parasema Meyrick, 1913
- Brachmia perumbrata Meyrick, 1918
- Brachmia philomusa Meyrick, 1918
- Brachmia planicola Meyrick, 1932
- Brachmia ptochodryas Meyrick, 1923
- Brachmia resoluta Meyrick, 1918
- Brachmia sitiens Meyrick, 1918
- Brachmia stactopis Meyrick, 1931
- Brachmia syntonopis Meyrick, 1923
- Brachmia vecors Meyrick, 1918
- Brachmia xerastis (Meyrick, 1905)
- Brachyacma aprica (Meyrick, 1913)
- Brachyacma tabellata (Meyrick, 1913)
- Brachyacma trychota Meyrick, 1929
- Bucolarcha geodes Meyrick, 1929
- Carbatina picrocarpa Meyrick, 1913
- Chelaria anguinea Meyrick, 1913
- Chelaria antiastis Meyrick, 1929
- Chelaria caryodora Meyrick, 1913
- Chelaria cirrhospila Meyrick, 1920
- Chelaria cymoptila Meyrick, 1929
- Chelaria ephippiastis Meyrick, 1937
- Chelaria haligramma Meyrick, 1926
- Chelaria isopogon Meyrick, 1929
- Chelaria isoptila Meyrick, 1913
- Chelaria lactifera Meyrick, 1913
- Chelaria levata Meyrick, 1920
- Chelaria obtruncata Meyrick, 1923
- Chelaria polemica Meyrick, 1935
- Chelaria rhicnota Meyrick, 1916
- Chelaria scopulosa Meyrick, 1913
- Chelaria silvestris Meyrick, 1913
- Chelaria spathota Meyrick, 1913
- Chelaria stictocosma Meyrick, 1920
- Chelaria taphronoma Meyrick, 1932
- Chelaria tephroptila Meyrick, 1931
- Chelaria tonsa Meyrick, 1913
- Chelaria verticosa Meyrick, 1913
- Cnaphostola adamantina Meyrick, 1918
- Coconympha iriarcha Meyrick, 1931
- Colpomorpha orthomeris Meyrick, 1929
- Corthyntis chlorotricha Meyrick, 1916
- Crocogma isocola Meyrick, 1918
- Cymotricha antisticta Meyrick, 1929
- Cymotricha chlanidota (Meyrick, 1927)
- Cymotricha cymatodes (Meyrick, 1916)
- Cymotricha illicita Meyrick, 1929
- Cymotricha metatoxa Meyrick, 1935
- Cymotricha pelitis (Meyrick, 1913)
- Cymotricha pseudometra (Meyrick, 1913)
- Cymotricha tephroxesta Meyrick, 1931
- Cymotricha tetraschema Meyrick, 1931
- Deimnestra thyrsicola (Meyrick, 1913)
- Demopractis tonaea Meyrick, 1918
- Desmophylax barymochla Meyrick, 1935
- Diastaltica asymmetria Walia and Wadhawan, 2006
- Dichomeris acuminata (Staudinger, 1876)
- Dichomeris allantopa Meyrick, 1934
- Dichomeris bispotal Walia and Wadhawan, 2004
- Dichomeris brachygrapha Meyrick, 1920
- Dichomeris ceponoma Meyrick, 1918
- Dichomeris crepitatrix Meyrick, 1913
- Dichomeris eridantis (Meyrick, 1907)
- Dichomeris excoriata Meyrick, 1913
- Dichomeris ferrata Meyrick, 1913
- Dichomeris ferruginosa Meyrick, 1913
- Dichomeris fuscodelta Walia and Wadhawan, 2004
- Dichomeris hansi Walia and Wadhawan, 2004
- Dichomeris hastata Meyrick, 1918
- Dichomeris ianthes (Meyrick,1887)
- Dichomeris imbricata Meyrick, 1913
- Dichomeris intensa Meyrick, 1913
- Dichomeris kalesarensis Walia and W adhawan, 2004
- Dichomeris leucothicta Meyrick, 1919
- Dichomeris lissota Meyrick, 1913
- Dichomeris malachias (Meyrick, 1913)
- Dichomeris melanortha Meyrick, 1929
- Dichomeris mesoglena Meyrick, 1923
- Dichomeris metrodes Meyrick, 1913
- Dichomeris petalodes Meyrick, 1934
- Dichomeris ptychosema Meyrick, 1913
- Dichomeris quercicola Meyrick, 1921
- Dichomeris rasilella (Herrich-Schäffer, 1855)
- Dichomeris sciodora Meyrick, 1922
- Dichomeris sciritis (Meyrick, 1918)
- Dichomeris sicaellus Pathania and Rose, 2003
- Dichomeris sicasymmetria Walia and Wadhawan, 2004
- Dichomeris summata Meyrick, 1913
- Dichomeris viridella (Snellen, 1901)
- Empedaula insipiens Meyrick, 1918
- Encolpotis heliopepta Meyrick, 1918
- Encrasima communicata Meyrick, 1918
- Enthetica picryntis Meyrick, 1916
- Enthetica tribrachia Meyrick, 1923
- Ephysteris chersaea Meyrick, 1908
- Ephysteris suasoria Meyrick, 1918
- Ephysteris subcaerulea Meyrick, 1918
- Epimimastis emblematica Meyrick, 1916
- Epimimastis glaucodes Meyrick, 1910
- Epithectis palaeris Meyrick, 1895
- Ficulea blandulella Walker, 1864
- Gaesa decusella Walker, 1864
- Gaesa leucothicta (Meyrick, 1922)
- Gaesa melitura (Meyrick, 1916)
- Gaesa semnias Meyrick, 1926
- Gelechia biclavala Meyrick, 1934
- Gelechia horiaula Meyrick, 1918
- Gelechia luticoma Meyrick, 1929
- Gelechia planodes Meyrick, 1918
- Gelechia stenacma Meyrick, 1935
- Gelechia trachydyta Meyrick, 1920
- Gnorimoschema atomatma (Meyrick, 1932)
- Gnorimoschema blapsigona (Meyrick, 1916)
- Gnorimoschema dryosyrta (Meyrick, 1931)
- Gnorimoschema ergasima (Meyrick, 1916)
- Gnorimoschema horoscopa (Meyrick, 1926)
- Gnorimoschema machinata (Meyrick, 1929)
- Gnorimoschema ramulata (Meyrick, 1926)
- Gnorimoschema subcaerulea (Meyrick, 1918)
- Gnorimoschema tetrameris (Meyrick, 1926)
- Gnorimoschema trachydyta (Meyrick, 1920)
- Helcystogramma arotraea Meyrick, 1894
- Helcystogramma clarkei Rose and Pathania, 2003
- Helcystogramma cyanozona (Meyrick, 1923)
- Helcystogramma hibisci (Stainton, 1859)
- Helcystogramma hoplophora (Meyrick, 1916)
- Helcystogramma leucoplecta (Meyrick, 1911)
- Helcystogramma uedai Rose and Pathania, 2003
- Heliangara macaritis Meyrick, 1910
- Heteralcis bathroptila Meyrick, 1925
- Heteroderces oxylitha Meyrick, 1929
- Hypatima spathota (Meyrick, 1913)
- Hypatima tephroptila (Meyrick, 1931)
- Hypatima vinculata Pathania and Rose, 2003
- Hypelictis acrochlora (Meyrick, 1905)
- Hypelictis albiscripta Meyrick, 1914
- Hypelictis frenigera Meyrick, 1913
- Hypelictis lupata Meyrick, 1913
- Hypochasmia cirrhocrena Meyrick, 1929
- Idiophantis acanthopa Meyrick, 1931
- Idiophantis carpotoma Meyrick, 1916
- Idiophantis chalcura Meyrick, 1907
- Idiophantis hemiphaea Meyrick, 1907
- Idiophantis melanosacta Meyrick, 1907
- Idiophantis stoica Meyrick, 1907
- Inotica gaesata Meyrick, 1913
- Ischnophenax streblopis Meyrick, 1931
- Istrianis brucinella (Mann, 1872)
- Istrianis crauropa Meyrick, 1918
- Istrianis steganotricha (Meyrick, 1935)
- Kiwaia ramulata (Meyrick, 1926)
- Larcophora sophronistis (Meyrick, 1918)
- Magonympha chrysocosma Meyrick, 1916
- Mesophleps trychota Meyrick, 1929
- Meteoristis religiosa Meyrick, 1923
- Mnesistega convexa Meyrick, 1923
- Mnesistega talantodes Meyrick, 1918
- Musurga sandycitis (Meyrick, 1907)
- Mylothra creseritis Meyrick, 1907
- Nealyda panchromatica (Meyrick, 1926)
- Nothris coercita (Meyrick, 1929)
- Nothris hastata (Meyrick, 1918)
- Onebala armata Meyrick, 1911
- Onebala balteata (Meyrick, 1911)
- Onebala brabylitis (Meyrick, 1911)
- Onebala foederalis Meyrick, 1923
- Onebala infibulata (Meyrick, 1916)
- Onebala leptobrocha Meyrick, 1910
- Onebala leucograpta Meyrick, 1923
- Onebala metriodes Meyrick, 1918
- Onebala obscurata (Meyrick, 1911)
- Onebala pogonias Meyrick, 1923
- Onebala sophronistis Meyrick, 1918
- Onebala thiostoma Meyrick, 1929
- Onebala victrix (Meyrick, 1911)
- Pachnistis arens Meyrick, 1913
- Pachnistis cephalochra Meyrick, 1907
- Pachnistis inhonesta Meyrick, 1916
- Parachronistis destillans Meyrick, 1918
- Paradoris anaphracta Meyrick, 1907
- Pectinophora gossypiella (Saunders, 1844)
- Peucoteles herpestica Meyrick, 1931
- Petalostomella lygrodes (Meyrick, 1931)
- Phthorimaea blapsigona Meyrick, 1916
- Phthorimaea ergasima Meyrick, 1916
- Phthorimaea horoscopa (Meyrick, 1926)
- Phthorimaea mixolitha Meyrick, 1918
- Phthorimaea operculella Zeller, 1877
- Pilocrates prograpta Meyrick, 1920
- Pityocona bifurcatus Wadhawan and W alia, 2006
- Pityocona xeropis Meyrick, 1918
- Polyhymno alcimacha Meyrick, 1918
- Protobathra erista Meyrick, 1916
- Pseudocrates soritica Meyrick, 1918
- Ptocheuusa paupella (Zeller, 1847)
- Recurvaria dryozona (Meyrick, 1916)
- Recurvaria ochrospila Meyrick, 1934
- Sarisphora agorastis Meyrick, 1931
- Schemataspis bicunea (Meyrick, 1911)
- Scrobipalpa heliopa Lower, 1900
- Semnolocha choleroleuca (Meyrick, 1931)
- Semnostoma barathrota Meyrick, 1918
- Semnostoma leucochalca Meyrick, 1918
- Semnostoma poecilopa Meyrick, 1918
- Semnostoma scatebrosa Meyrick, 1918
- Sitotroga aenictopa Meyrick, 1927
- Sitotroga cerealella (Olivier, 1789)
- Sitotroga palearis (Meyrick, 1913)
- Sphaerolbia chrematistis Meyrick, 1934
- Stegasta comissata Meyrick, 1923
- Stegasta omelkoi Rose and Pathania, 2004
- Stegasta pawani Walia and Wadhawan, 2004
- Stegasta valvulata Walia and Wadhawan, 2004
- Stegasta variana Meyrick, 1904
- Stenolechia deltocausta Meyrick, 1929
- Stenolechia frustulenta Meyrick, 1923
- Stenolechia marginipunctella (Stainton, 1859)
- Stenolechia trichaspis Meyrick, 1918
- Stenolechia zelosaris Meyrick, 1923
- Stiphrostola longinqua Meyrick, 1923
- Stomopteryx nertaria Meyrick, 1918
- Stomopteryx praecipitata Meyrick, 1918
- Stomopteryx sphenodoxa Meyrick, 1931
- Stomopteryx syncrita Meyrick, 1926
- Stryphnocopa trinotata Meyrick, 1920
- Symmoca acatharta (Meyrick, 1911)
- Symmoca alacris Meyrick, 1918
- Symmoca amblycryptis Meyrick, 1929
- Symmoca amphicalyx (Meyrick, 1911)
- Symmoca anthracosema (Meyrick, 1933)
- Symmoca corymbitis Meyrick, 1926
- Symmoca dolabrata Meyrick, 1916
- Symmoca epenthetica Meyrick, 1931
- Symmoca hemilyca (Meyrick, 1910)
- Symmoca indagata Meyrick, 1918
- Symmoca maschalista Meyrick, 1926
- Symmoca oxycryptis Meyrick, 1929
- Symmoca palacta (Meyrick, 1911)
- Symmoca planicola (Meyrick, 1932)
- Symmoca rhodota (Meyrick, 1911)
- Symmoca stesichora (Meyrick, 1911)
- Syncathedra criminata Meyrick, 1923
- Syncratomorpha euthetodes Meyrick, 1929
- Telphusa atomatma (Meyrick, 1932)
- Telphusa caecigena Meyrick, 1918
- Telphusa conviciata Meyrick, 1929
- Telphusa destillans Meyrick, 1918
- Telphusa improvida Meyrick, 1926
- Telphusa inferialis Meyrick, 1918
- Telphusa machinata (Meyrick, 1929)
- Telphusa melanozona Meyrick, 1913
- Telphusa nephelaspis Meyrick, 1926
- Telphusa platyphracta Meyrick, 1935
- Telphusa tetragrapta Meyrick, 1937
- Telphusa vinolenta (Meyrick, 1919)
- Thiotricha acrantha Meyrick, 1908
- Thiotricha albicephalata Walia and Wadhawan, 2004
- Thiotricha amphixysta Meyrick, 1929
- Thiotricha animosella (Walker, 1864)
- Thiotricha balanopa Meyrick, 1918
- Thiotricha centritis Meyrick, 1908
- Thiotricha characias Meyrick, 1918
- Thiotricha clidias Meyrick, 1908
- Thiotricha clinopeda Meyrick, 1918
- Thiotricha complicata Meyrick, 1918
- Thiotricha cuneiformis Meyrick, 1918
- Thiotricha delacma Meyrick, 1923
- Thiotricha epiclista Meyrick, 1908
- Thiotricha flagellatrix Meyrick, 1929
- Thiotricha galactaea Meyrick, 1908
- Thiotricha gemmulans Meyrick, 1931
- Thiotricha grammitis Meyrick, 1908
- Thiotricha hoplomacha Meyrick, 1908
- Thiotricha janitrix Meyrick, 1912
- Thiotricha nephodesma Meyrick, 1918
- Thiotricha obvoluta Meyrick, 1918
- Thiotricha operaria Meyrick, 1918
- Thiotricha orthiastis Meyrick, 1905
- Thiotricha oxygramma Meyrick, 1918
- Thiotricha pancratiastis Meyrick, 1921
- Thiotricha polyaula Meyrick, 1918
- Thiotricha pteropis Meyrick, 1908
- Thiotricha pyrphora Meyrick, 1918
- Thiotricha rabida Meyrick, 1929
- Thiotricha rhodomicta Meyrick, 1918
- Thiotricha rhodopa Meyrick, 1908
- Thiotricha scioplecta Meyrick, 1918
- Thiotricha synacma Meyrick, 1918
- Thiotricha termanthes Meyrick, 1929
- Thiotricha xanthaspis Meyrick, 1918
- Thyrsostoma albilustra Walia and W adhawan, 2004
- Thyrsostoma chelophora Meyrick, 1918
- Thyrsostoma diplobathra Meyrick, 1906
- Thyrsostoma fissilis Meyrick, 1906
- Thyrsostoma glaucitis Meyrick, 1907
- Thyrsostoma macrodelta Meyrick, 1918
- Thyrsostoma nesoclera Meyrick, 1929
- Thyrsostoma pylartis (Meyrick, 1908)
- Thyrsostoma shivai Walia and W adhawan, 2004
- Timyra corythista Meyrick, 1918
- Timyra hydrosema Meyrick, 1916
- Timyra rhizophora Meyrick, 1919
- Toxotacma meditans Meyrick, 1929
- Trachyedra xylomorpha Meyrick, 1929
- Trichembola epichorda Meyrick, 1918
- Trichembola opisthopa Meyrick, 1918
- Trichembola segnis Meyrick, 1918
- Trichoboscis pansarista Meyrick, 1929
- Trichotaphe amphichlora Meyrick, 1923
- Trichotaphe caerulescens Meyrick, 1913
- Trichotaphe cellaria Meyrick, 1913
- Trichotaphe centracma Meyrick, 1923
- Trichotaphe cocta Meyrick, 1913
- Trichotaphe corniculata Meyrick, 1913
- Trichotaphe crambaleas Meyrick, 1913
- Trichotaphe cymatodes Meyrick, 1916
- Trichotaphe fungifera Meyrick, 1913
- Trichotaphe geochrota Meyrick, 1914
- Trichotaphe illucescens Meyrick, 1918
- Trichotaphe lissota Meyrick, 1913
- Trichotaphe melitura Meyrick, 1916
- Trichotaphe procrossa Meyrick, 1913
- Trichotaphe sciritis (Meyrick, 1918)
- Trichotaphe siranta Meyrick, 1913
- Tricyanaula augusta (Meyrick, 1911)
- Tricyanaula cyanozona (Meyrick, 1923)
- Xystoceros tripleura Meyrick, 1914
- Xystophora asthenodes (Meyrick, 1923)
- Xystophora defixa (Meyrick, 1929)
- Zalithia doxarcha (Meyrick, 1916)
- Zalithia enoptrias (Meyrick, 1911)
- Zomeutis dicausta Meyrick, 1913
