= Pityocona =

Scientific classification
- Kingdom: Animalia
- Phylum: Arthropoda
- Clade: Pancrustacea
- Class: Insecta
- Order: Lepidoptera
- Family: Gelechiidae
- Subfamily: Gelechiinae
- Genus: Pityocona; Meyrick, 1918

Type species
- Pityocona xeropis Meyrick, 1918

Species
- See text

Synonyms
- Pitycona (lapsus)

Genus of moths

Pityocona is a small and little-known genus of the twirler moth family (Gelechiidae). Among these, it is believed to belong to subfamily Gelechiinae, but beyond that its relationships are still obscure.

They are small inconspicuous moths with pointed wings. In the forewing, the second vein is weakly developed but not joined to the third. Their labial palps have a pointed tip and the second segment is unornamented.

The genus contains five species, one of which was described only in 2006:

- Pityocona attenuata J.F.G.Clarke, 1986
- Pityocona bifurcatus Wadhawan & Walia, 2006
- Pityocona porphyroscia Meyrick, 1927
- Pityocona probleta Bradley, 1961
- Pityocona xeropis Meyrick, 1918
