= Antiochtha semialis =

Scientific classification
- Kingdom: Animalia
- Phylum: Arthropoda
- Clade: Pancrustacea
- Class: Insecta
- Order: Lepidoptera
- Family: Lecithoceridae
- Genus: Antiochtha
- Species: A. semialis

Binomial name
- Antiochtha semialis Park, 2002

Species of moth

Antiochtha semialis is a moth in the family Lecithoceridae. It was described by Kyu-Tek Park in 2002. It is found in Thailand.
