= Aphanostola sparsipalpis =

Scientific classification
- Kingdom: Animalia
- Phylum: Arthropoda
- Class: Insecta
- Order: Lepidoptera
- Family: Gelechiidae
- Genus: Aphanostola
- Species: A. sparsipalpis

Binomial name
- Aphanostola sparsipalpis Meyrick, 1931

Species of moth

Aphanostola sparsipalpis is a species of moth in the family Gelechiidae. It was described by Edward Meyrick in 1931. It is found in Sri Lanka.

The wingspan is about 6 mm. The wings are all grey.
