= Antiochtha vigilax =

Scientific classification
- Kingdom: Animalia
- Phylum: Arthropoda
- Class: Insecta
- Order: Lepidoptera
- Family: Lecithoceridae
- Genus: Antiochtha
- Species: A. vigilax

Binomial name
- Antiochtha vigilax (Meyrick, 1910)

Synonyms
- Onebala vigilax Meyrick, 1910

Species of moth

Antiochtha vigilax is a moth in the family Lecithoceridae. It was described by Edward Meyrick in 1910. It is found in Sri Lanka.

The wingspan is 21–24 mm. The forewings are pale yellow-ochreous, partially tinged with brownish, and thinly sprinkled with dark fuscous or black. There is an undefined basal fascia of dark fuscous irroration and there are two undefined transverse shades of dark fuscous or blackish irroration, the first from one-fourth of the costa to two-fifths of the dorsum, angulated on the fold, the second from two-thirds of the costa to three-fourths of the dorsum, obtusely angulated in the disc, followed by a paler shade with a few white scales. The stigmata are blackish, the plical obliquely beyond the first discal, these two placed on the first transverse shade, the second discal transverse, edged with a few white scales. There is a dark fuscous terminal line. The hindwings are pale whitish-ochreous, more or less tinged with fuscous, especially posteriorly.
