= Hyperochtha hoplophora =

Scientific classification
- Kingdom: Animalia
- Phylum: Arthropoda
- Clade: Pancrustacea
- Class: Insecta
- Order: Lepidoptera
- Family: Lecithoceridae
- Genus: Hyperochtha
- Species: H. hoplophora

Binomial name
- Hyperochtha hoplophora Gozmány, 1973

Species of moth

Hyperochtha hoplophora is a moth in the family Lecithoceridae. It was described by László Anthony Gozmány in 1973. It is found in Nepal.
