= Pityocona probleta =

Scientific classification
- Domain: Eukaryota
- Kingdom: Animalia
- Phylum: Arthropoda
- Class: Insecta
- Order: Lepidoptera
- Family: Gelechiidae
- Genus: Pityocona
- Species: P. probleta

Binomial name
- Pityocona probleta Bradley, 1961

Species of moth

Pityocona probleta is a moth in the family Gelechiidae. It was described by Edward Meyrick in 1927. It is found on Guadalcanal.

The wingspan is 10–11 mm.
