= Hyperochtha butyropa =

Scientific classification
- Kingdom: Animalia
- Phylum: Arthropoda
- Class: Insecta
- Order: Lepidoptera
- Family: Lecithoceridae
- Genus: Hyperochtha
- Species: H. butyropa

Binomial name
- Hyperochtha butyropa (Meyrick, 1910)

Synonyms
- Onebala butyropa Meyrick, 1910

Species of moth

Hyperochtha butyropa is a moth in the family Lecithoceridae. It was described by Edward Meyrick in 1910. It is found in Sri Lanka.

The wingspan is 14–17 mm. The forewings are rather dark purplish fuscous with the basal area darker purplish fuscous, its margin formed by an irregular line from two-fifths of the costa to two-thirds of the dorsum. The stigmata are cloudy, blackish and indistinct, the first discal lying on the edge of this patch and the plical rather obliquely before it. There is a pale ochreous-yellowish dot on the costa at five-sixths. The hindwings are pale grey.
