= Antiochtha longivincula =

Scientific classification
- Kingdom: Animalia
- Phylum: Arthropoda
- Clade: Pancrustacea
- Class: Insecta
- Order: Lepidoptera
- Family: Lecithoceridae
- Genus: Antiochtha
- Species: A. longivincula

Binomial name
- Antiochtha longivincula Wu & Park, 1998

Species of moth

Antiochtha longivincula is a moth in the family Lecithoceridae. It was described by Chun-Sheng Wu and Kyu-Tek Park in 1998. It is found in Sri Lanka.

The wingspan is 16–18 mm.

== Etymology ==
The species name is derived from Latin longus (meaning long) and vinculum.
