= Aphanostola =

Scientific classification
- Domain: Eukaryota
- Kingdom: Animalia
- Phylum: Arthropoda
- Class: Insecta
- Order: Lepidoptera
- Family: Gelechiidae
- Subfamily: Gelechiinae
- Genus: Aphanostola; Meyrick, 1931

Genus of moths

Aphanostola is a genus of moths in the family Gelechiidae.

== Species ==
- Aphanostola atripalpis Meyrick, 1931
- Aphanostola intercepta Meyrick, 1932
- Aphanostola sparsipalpis Meyrick, 1931
