= Heliangara lampetis =

Scientific classification
- Kingdom: Animalia
- Phylum: Arthropoda
- Class: Insecta
- Order: Lepidoptera
- Family: Autostichidae
- Genus: Heliangara
- Species: H. lampetis

Binomial name
- Heliangara lampetis Meyrick, 1906

Species of moth

Heliangara lampetis is a moth in the family Autostichidae. It was described by Edward Meyrick in 1906. It is found in Sri Lanka.

The wingspan is 11–13 mm. The forewings are bright shining purple coppery bronze with a suffused orange-yellow patch extending along the dorsum from one-fourth to three-fourths, narrowed to the extremities, not reaching halfway across the wing. There are two parallel thick transverse ridges of raised scales at about two-thirds. The hindwings are dark fuscous, thinly scaled in the disc.
