= Antiochtha oxyzona =

Scientific classification
- Kingdom: Animalia
- Phylum: Arthropoda
- Class: Insecta
- Order: Lepidoptera
- Family: Lecithoceridae
- Genus: Antiochtha
- Species: A. oxyzona

Binomial name
- Antiochtha oxyzona (Meyrick, 1910)

Synonyms
- Onebala oxyzona Meyrick, 1910

Species of moth

Antiochtha oxyzona is a moth in the family Lecithoceridae. It was described by Edward Meyrick in 1910. It is found in Sri Lanka.

The wingspan is 10–12 mm. The forewings are purple-fuscous, sprinkled with blackish and with the costal edge more or less yellowish. The markings are deep ochreous-yellowish with some undefined suffusion towards the costa and the fold about one-fourth. There are two narrow cloudy transverse fasciae, the first before the middle, sinuate, the second at two-thirds, interrupted in the disc. There is a cloudy ring representing the second discal stigma and with two dots on the costa posteriorly, and a line along the termen. The hindwings are grey.
