= Antiochtha =

Scientific classification
- Kingdom: Animalia
- Phylum: Arthropoda
- Clade: Pancrustacea
- Class: Insecta
- Order: Lepidoptera
- Family: Lecithoceridae
- Subfamily: Torodorinae
- Genus: Antiochtha; Meyrick, 1905

Synonyms
- Gasmara Walker, 1864 (preocc. Walker, [1863])

Genus of moths

Antiochtha is a genus of moths in the family Lecithoceridae.

== Species ==
- Antiochtha achnastis Meyrick, 1906
- Antiochtha angustivalva Park, 2006
- Antiochtha aquila Park, 2002
- Antiochtha balbidota Meyrick, 1905
- Antiochtha cataclina (Meyrick, 1923)
- Antiochtha coelatella (Walker, 1864)
- Antiochtha foederalis (Meyrick, 1923)
- Antiochtha leucograpta (Meyrick, 1923)
- Antiochtha longivincula Wu & Park, 1998
- Antiochtha nakhonica Park, 2002
- Antiochtha oxyzona (Meyrick, 1910)
- Antiochtha periastra (Meyrick, 1910)
- Antiochtha pusilla Park, 2002
- Antiochtha pycnotarsa (Park & Wu, 2001)
- Antiochtha semialis Park, 2002
- Antiochtha stellulata Meyrick, 1906
- Antiochtha triangulosa Park, 2008
- Antiochtha vigilax (Meyrick, 1910)
