= Antiochtha pycnotarsa =

Scientific classification
- Kingdom: Animalia
- Phylum: Arthropoda
- Clade: Pancrustacea
- Class: Insecta
- Order: Lepidoptera
- Family: Lecithoceridae
- Genus: Antiochtha
- Species: A. pycnotarsa

Binomial name
- Antiochtha pycnotarsa (Park & C. S. Wu, 2001)

Synonyms
- Antiochta pycnotarsa Park & C. S. Wu, 2001

Species of moth

Antiochtha pycnotarsa is a moth in the family Lecithoceridae. It was described by Kyu-Tek Park and Chun-Sheng Wu in 2001. It is found in Sri Lanka.

The wingspan is about 16 mm.

== Etymology ==
The species name refers to the thickened tarsus and is derived from pycno (meaning thick).
