= Heliangara ericydes =

Scientific classification
- Kingdom: Animalia
- Phylum: Arthropoda
- Class: Insecta
- Order: Lepidoptera
- Family: Autostichidae
- Genus: Heliangara
- Species: H. ericydes

Binomial name
- Heliangara ericydes Meyrick, 1916

Species of moth

Heliangara ericydes is a moth in the family Autostichidae. It was described by Edward Meyrick in 1916 and is found in Sri Lanka.

Its wingspan is about 10 mm. The forewings are bright deep purple, becoming coppery bronze on the dorsal half from the base to beyond the middle, and the hindwings are blackish.
