= Hyperochtha acanthovalva =

Scientific classification
- Kingdom: Animalia
- Phylum: Arthropoda
- Clade: Pancrustacea
- Class: Insecta
- Order: Lepidoptera
- Family: Lecithoceridae
- Genus: Hyperochtha
- Species: H. acanthovalva

Binomial name
- Hyperochtha acanthovalva Park, 2001

Species of moth

Hyperochtha acanthovalva is a moth in the family Lecithoceridae. It was described by Kyu-Tek Park in 2001. It is found in Sri Lanka.

The wingspan is 9.5–10 mm.
