= Antiochtha periastra =

Scientific classification
- Domain: Eukaryota
- Kingdom: Animalia
- Phylum: Arthropoda
- Class: Insecta
- Order: Lepidoptera
- Family: Lecithoceridae
- Genus: Antiochtha
- Species: A. periastra

Binomial name
- Antiochtha periastra (Meyrick, 1910)

Synonyms
- Onebala periastra Meyrick, 1910

Species of moth

Antiochtha periastra is a moth in the family Lecithoceridae. It was described by Edward Meyrick in 1910. It is found in Sri Lanka.

The wingspan is 17–18 mm. The forewings are dark purplish-fuscous, the base of the scales pale. The stigmata are represented by small round whitish spots, the plical slightly beyond the first discal. There are small whitish spots on the costa at two-fifths and before three-fourths. There are whitish dots on the dorsum at one-fourth and towards the tornus, the latter sometimes connected with the second costal spot by a curved series of three or four small whitish dots. The hindwings are ochreous-whitish tinged with grey.
