= Enthetica =

Scientific classification
- Kingdom: Animalia
- Phylum: Arthropoda
- Class: Insecta
- Order: Lepidoptera
- Family: Lecithoceridae
- Genus: Enthetica; Meyrick, 1916

Genus of moths

Enthetica is a genus of moth in the family Lecithoceridae.

== Species ==
- Enthetica picryntis Meyrick, 1916
- Enthetica tribrachia Meyrick, 1923
