= Antiochtha balbidota =

Scientific classification
- Kingdom: Animalia
- Phylum: Arthropoda
- Class: Insecta
- Order: Lepidoptera
- Family: Lecithoceridae
- Genus: Antiochtha
- Species: A. balbidota

Binomial name
- Antiochtha balbidota Meyrick, 1905

Species of moth

Antiochtha balbidota is a moth in the family Lecithoceridae. It was described by Edward Meyrick in 1905. It is found in Sri Lanka.

The wingspan is 17–18 mm. The forewings are light fuscous with some scattered dark fuscous scales, the median area is suffusedly mixed with whitish. There is a short blackish bar from the base of the costa and a narrow irregular blackish fascia from one-fourth of the costa to before the middle of the dorsum, more or less obsolete on the dorsum, edged posteriorly with whitish suffusion. A round blackish dot, edged with whitish suffusion, is found in the disc beyond the middle and there is an ill-defined cloudy whitish transverse line from three-fourths of the costa to before the tornus, somewhat angulated outwards in the middle. The edge of the termen and tornus are suffused with dark fuscous. The hindwings are light fuscous, darker on the termen.
