= Antiochtha stellulata =

Scientific classification
- Kingdom: Animalia
- Phylum: Arthropoda
- Class: Insecta
- Order: Lepidoptera
- Family: Lecithoceridae
- Genus: Antiochtha
- Species: A. stellulata

Binomial name
- Antiochtha stellulata Meyrick, 1906

Species of moth

Antiochtha stellulata is a moth in the family Lecithoceridae. It was described by Edward Meyrick in 1906. It is found in Sri Lanka.

The wingspan is about 22 mm. The forewings are pale fuscous irrorated (sprinkled) with dark fuscous, with strong purplish reflections. The markings are pale whitish ochreous, yellower on the costal edge. There are transverse marks from the costa beyond one-third and two-thirds, the first narrow and irregular, the second rather broader. There is a dot on the fold before the middle and two minute dots transversely placed in the disc beyond the middle. Four dots form a curved transverse subterminal series on the dorsal half. The hindwings are fuscous.
