= Semnostoma =

Scientific classification
- Domain: Eukaryota
- Kingdom: Animalia
- Phylum: Arthropoda
- Class: Insecta
- Order: Lepidoptera
- Family: Gelechiidae
- Subfamily: Gelechiinae
- Genus: Semnostoma; Meyrick, 1918

Genus of moths

Semnostoma is a genus of moth in the family Gelechiidae.

== Species ==
- Semnostoma barathrota Meyrick, 1918
- Semnostoma leucochalca Meyrick, 1918
- Semnostoma poecilopa Meyrick, 1918
- Semnostoma scatebrosa Meyrick, 1918
