= Antiochtha triangulosa =

Scientific classification
- Kingdom: Animalia
- Phylum: Arthropoda
- Clade: Pancrustacea
- Class: Insecta
- Order: Lepidoptera
- Family: Lecithoceridae
- Genus: Antiochtha
- Species: A. triangulosa

Binomial name
- Antiochtha triangulosa Park, 2008

Species of moth

Antiochtha triangulosa is a moth in the family Lecithoceridae. It was described by Kyu-Tek Park in 2008. It is found in Palawan in the Philippines.
