= Pityocona porphyroscia =

Scientific classification
- Kingdom: Animalia
- Phylum: Arthropoda
- Class: Insecta
- Order: Lepidoptera
- Family: Gelechiidae
- Genus: Pityocona
- Species: P. porphyroscia

Binomial name
- Pityocona porphyroscia Meyrick, 1927

Species of moth

Pityocona porphyroscia is a moth in the family Gelechiidae. It was described by Edward Meyrick in 1927. It is found on Samoa.
