= Heteroderces =

Scientific classification
- Kingdom: Animalia
- Phylum: Arthropoda
- Class: Insecta
- Order: Lepidoptera
- Family: Lecithoceridae
- Genus: Heteroderces; Meyrick, 1929

Genus of moths

Heteroderces is a genus of moths in the family Lecithoceridae.

== Species ==
- Heteroderces oxylitha Meyrick, 1929
- Heteroderces paeta Meyrick, 1929
