= Antiochtha cataclina =

Scientific classification
- Kingdom: Animalia
- Phylum: Arthropoda
- Class: Insecta
- Order: Lepidoptera
- Family: Lecithoceridae
- Genus: Antiochtha
- Species: A. cataclina

Binomial name
- Antiochtha cataclina (Meyrick, 1923)

Synonyms
- Onebala cataclina Meyrick, 1923

Species of moth

Antiochtha cataclina is a moth in the family Lecithoceridae. It was described by Edward Meyrick in 1923. It is found in Sri Lanka.

The wingspan is about 21 mm. The forewings are whitish-ochreous suffused light grey and sprinkled dark fuscous. There is a small blackish spot on the base of the costa and an irregular purple-blackish streak from one-fourth of the costa to the middle of the dorsum, thickest on the costa, the first discal and plical stigmata forming spots on this, the second discal stigma forming a small blackish spot ringed whitish-ochreous. There is a pale ochreous spot on the costa at three-fourths, where an obscure shade obtusely angulated in the middle runs to the tornus, the terminal area beyond this forming a light fuscous fascia speckled blackish. There are also two pale ochreous dots on the costa towards the apex. The hindwings are light grey.
