= Mnesistega =

Scientific classification
- Kingdom: Animalia
- Phylum: Arthropoda
- Clade: Pancrustacea
- Class: Insecta
- Order: Lepidoptera
- Family: Gelechiidae
- Subfamily: Gelechiinae
- Genus: Mnesistega; Meyrick, 1918

Genus of moths

Mnesistega is a genus of moth in the family Gelechiidae.

== Species ==
- Mnesistega convexa Meyrick, 1923
- Mnesistega talantodes Meyrick, 1918
