= Heliangara =

Scientific classification
- Kingdom: Animalia
- Phylum: Arthropoda
- Class: Insecta
- Order: Lepidoptera
- Family: Autostichidae
- Subfamily: Autostichinae
- Genus: Heliangara; Meyrick, 1906

Genus of moths

Heliangara is a genus of moths in the family Gelechiidae.

== Species ==
- Heliangara ericydes Meyrick, 1916
- Heliangara lampetis Meyrick, 1906
- Heliangara macaritis Meyrick, 1910
