= Antiochtha achnastis =

Scientific classification
- Kingdom: Animalia
- Phylum: Arthropoda
- Class: Insecta
- Order: Lepidoptera
- Family: Lecithoceridae
- Genus: Antiochtha
- Species: A. achnastis

Binomial name
- Antiochtha achnastis Meyrick, 1906

Species of moth

Antiochtha achnastis is a moth in the family Lecithoceridae. It was described by Edward Meyrick in 1906. It is found in Sri Lanka.

The wingspan is 18–20 mm. The forewings are fuscous irrorated with dark fuscous or blackish. The stigmata are dark fuscous or black, ringed with whitish, sometimes large, the plical slightly beyond the first discal, these two placed in an indistinct irregular rather oblique narrow fascia of whitish suffusion which forms a more distinct whitish spot on the costa, sometimes preceded by a dark fuscous spot. There is a cloudy subterminal line of ochreous-whitish suffusion, angulated in the middle, forming a conspicuous triangular ochreous-white spot on the costa. The hindwings are grey, darker posteriorly.
