= Hyperochtha =

Scientific classification
- Domain: Eukaryota
- Kingdom: Animalia
- Phylum: Arthropoda
- Class: Insecta
- Order: Lepidoptera
- Family: Lecithoceridae
- Subfamily: Torodorinae
- Genus: Hyperochtha; Meyrick, 1925

Synonyms
- Abrachmia Amsel, 1968

Genus of moths

Hyperochtha is a genus of moth in the family Lecithoceridae.

== Species ==
- Hyperochtha acanthovalva Park, 2001
- Hyperochtha butyropa (Meyrick, 1910)
- Hyperochtha dischema (Meyrick, 1916)
- Hyperochtha hoplophora Gozmány, 1973
- Hyperochtha justa (Meyrick, 1910)
- Hyperochtha tanyglocha Wu & Park, 1999
