= Hyperochtha tanyglocha =

Scientific classification
- Kingdom: Animalia
- Phylum: Arthropoda
- Clade: Pancrustacea
- Class: Insecta
- Order: Lepidoptera
- Family: Lecithoceridae
- Genus: Hyperochtha
- Species: H. tanyglocha

Binomial name
- Hyperochtha tanyglocha Wu & Park, 1999

Species of moth

Hyperochtha tanyglocha is a moth in the family Lecithoceridae. It was described by Chun-Sheng Wu and Kyu-Tek Park in 1999. It is found in Sri Lanka.
