= Antiochtha coelatella =

Scientific classification
- Kingdom: Animalia
- Phylum: Arthropoda
- Class: Insecta
- Order: Lepidoptera
- Family: Lecithoceridae
- Genus: Antiochtha
- Species: A. coelatella

Binomial name
- Antiochtha coelatella (Walker, 1864)

Synonyms
- Gasmara coelatella Walker, 1864

Species of moth

Antiochtha coelatella is a moth in the family Lecithoceridae. It was described by Francis Walker in 1864. It is found in Sri Lanka.

Adults are cinereous (ash gray), the wings with a whitish marginal line. The forewings are purplish, with two transverse whitish costal streaks, and with a whitish discal ringlet. There are two whitish dots, the interior one near the interior border, the exterior one contiguous to the interior border.
