= Hyperochtha dischema =

Scientific classification
- Kingdom: Animalia
- Phylum: Arthropoda
- Class: Insecta
- Order: Lepidoptera
- Family: Lecithoceridae
- Genus: Hyperochtha
- Species: H. dischema

Binomial name
- Hyperochtha dischema (Meyrick, 1916)

Synonyms
- Onebala dischema Meyrick, 1916

Species of moth

Hyperochtha dischema is a moth in the family Lecithoceridae. It was described by Edward Meyrick in 1916. It is found in Malawi.

The wingspan is 8–9 mm. The forewings are rather dark slaty grey sprinkled with whitish and with the base more or less suffused with blackish. There is a blackish transverse fascia at one-third, preceded on the costa by an elongate suffused ochreous-whitish mark and a round blackish spot representing the second discal stigma. There is an ochreous-whitish spot on the costa at three-fourths sending a slightly sinuate line to the tornus, edged anteriorly with blackish suffusion. The hindwings are grey.
