= Heteroderces paeta =

Scientific classification
- Kingdom: Animalia
- Phylum: Arthropoda
- Class: Insecta
- Order: Lepidoptera
- Family: Lecithoceridae
- Genus: Heteroderces
- Species: H. paeta

Binomial name
- Heteroderces paeta Meyrick, 1929

Species of moth

Heteroderces paeta is a moth in the family Lecithoceridae. It was described by Edward Meyrick in 1929. It is found in Sri Lanka.

The wingspan is about 8 mm.
