= Pityocona xeropis =

Scientific classification
- Kingdom: Animalia
- Phylum: Arthropoda
- Class: Insecta
- Order: Lepidoptera
- Family: Gelechiidae
- Genus: Pityocona
- Species: P. xeropis

Binomial name
- Pityocona xeropis Meyrick, 1918

Species of moth

Pityocona xeropis is a moth in the family Gelechiidae. It was described by Edward Meyrick in 1918. It is found in Sri Lanka, southern India, Bengal, northern Vietnam and Java, Indonesia.

The wingspan is 10–12 mm. The forewings are brownish ochreous, more or less sprinkled with dark fuscous and with lines of white suffusion or irroration along the dorsum and fold. There are blackish dots beneath the fold at one-fifth of the wing and beneath the costa at one-third. The stigmata are black, finely ringed with white, with the plical usually elongate, very obliquely before the first discal. Sometimes, there are fine whitish lines on the veins towards the costa posteriorly and there are some indistinct blackish dots along the posterior third of the costa and termen. The hindwings are grey.
