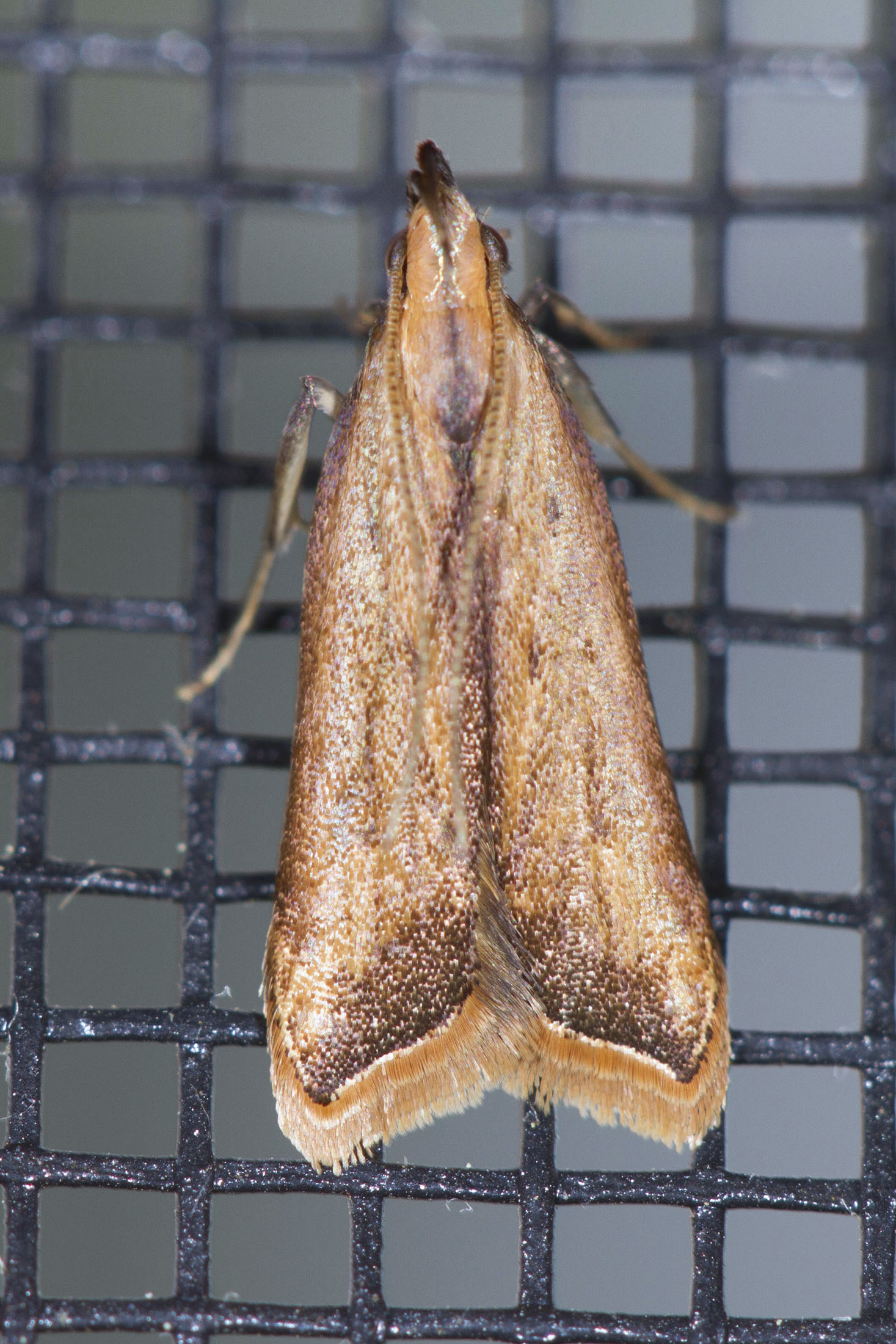

Scientific classification
- Kingdom: Animalia
- Phylum: Arthropoda
- Clade: Pancrustacea
- Class: Insecta
- Order: Lepidoptera
- Family: Gelechiidae
- Genus: Dichomeris
- Species: D. heriguronis

Binomial name
- Dichomeris heriguronis (Matsumura, 1931)

Synonyms
- Nothris heriguronis Matsumura, 1931; Carbatina picrocarpa Meyrick, 1913; Trichotaphe iothalles Forbes, 1939

= Dichomeris heriguronis =

Species of moth

Dichomeris heriguronis, the black-edged dichomeris or black-edged carbatina, is a moth of the family Gelechiidae. It is found in the north-eastern United States, Korea, Japan, China, Taiwan and India. It has also been recorded in the Netherlands, where it is an exotic species.

The length of the forewings is 7.5-8.5 mm.

The larvae feed on Prunus species in Korea.
