= Dichomeris illucescens =

Scientific classification
- Kingdom: Animalia
- Phylum: Arthropoda
- Class: Insecta
- Order: Lepidoptera
- Family: Gelechiidae
- Genus: Dichomeris
- Species: D. illucescens

Binomial name
- Dichomeris illucescens (Meyrick, 1918)

Synonyms
- Trichotaphe illucescens Meyrick, 1918

Species of moth

Dichomeris illucescens is a moth in the family Gelechiidae. It was described by Edward Meyrick in 1918. It is found in Assam, India.

The wingspan is about 21 mm (0.83 in). The forewings are rather dark brown, with a slight violet tinge and with faint small hardly darker spots above and below the fold at one-fifth. The stigmata is cloudy, obscurely darker, the plical somewhat before the first discal, the first discal rather large, the second transverse. There is a faintly paler cloudy subterminal shade, as well as indistinct marginal dark fuscous dots around the apex and termen. The hindwings are ochreous whitish, the dorsum tinged grey and the apex and upper part of the termen suffused grey.
