= Brachmia officiosa =

Scientific classification
- Domain: Eukaryota
- Kingdom: Animalia
- Phylum: Arthropoda
- Class: Insecta
- Order: Lepidoptera
- Family: Gelechiidae
- Genus: Brachmia
- Species: B. officiosa

Binomial name
- Brachmia officiosa Meyrick, 1918

Synonyms
- Apethistis officiosa (Meyrick, 1918)

Species of moth

Brachmia officiosa is a moth in the family Gelechiidae. It was described by Edward Meyrick in 1918. It is found in southern India.

The wingspan is about 12 mm. The forewings are light fuscous, with the basal third of the costa suffused with dark fuscous. The stigmata is blackish, the plical beneath the first discal and there is a small cloudy blackish spot on the dorsum towards the tornus, as well as some small groups of blackish scales along thetermen. The hindwings are grey.
