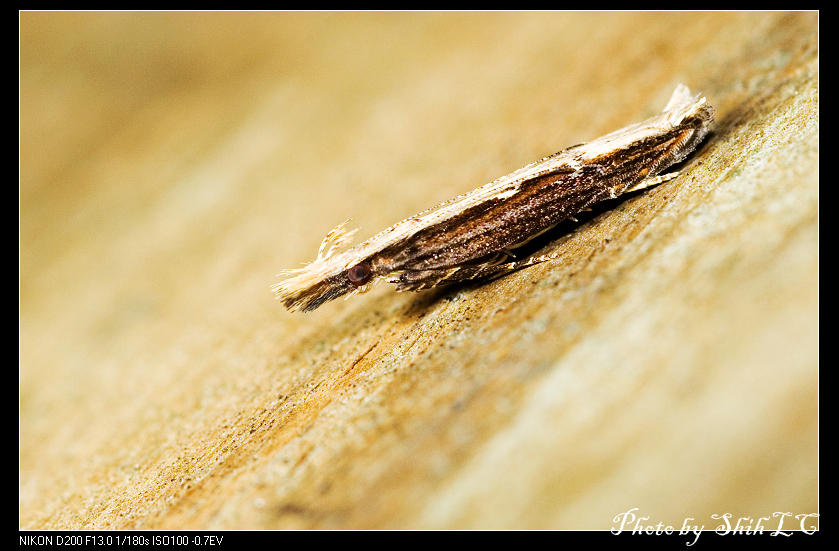

Scientific classification
- Kingdom: Animalia
- Phylum: Arthropoda
- Class: Insecta
- Order: Lepidoptera
- Family: Gelechiidae
- Genus: Hypatima
- Species: H. spathota

Binomial name
- Hypatima spathota (Meyrick, 1913)

Synonyms
- Chelaria spathota Meyrick, 1913; Nothris spathota

= Hypatima spathota =

Species of moth

Hypatima spathota is a moth in the family Gelechiidae. It was described by Edward Meyrick in 1913. It is found in Japan, Taiwan, India, Sri Lanka, China, Vietnam and Australia, where it has been recorded from Queensland.

The wingspan is 15–17 mm. The forewings are dark purple fuscous longitudinally streaked with black and with a dark brown streak above the fold from the base to four-fifths of the wing and a rather broad ochreous-whitish streak along the dorsum from the base to the tornus, then attenuated almost to the apex, including short blackish dashes on each side of the tornus, its upper edge with a short ochreous-whitish dash adjacent at two-fifths, and a similar but transverse mark at two-thirds. There is a fine white longitudinal line above the apical portion. The hindwings are fuscous, paler and thinly scaled anteriorly, with the veins and termen suffused with darker.

The larvae feed on Mangifera indica and Lannea grandis.
