= Dichomeris chlanidota =

Scientific classification
- Kingdom: Animalia
- Phylum: Arthropoda
- Clade: Pancrustacea
- Class: Insecta
- Order: Lepidoptera
- Family: Gelechiidae
- Genus: Dichomeris
- Species: D. chlanidota

Binomial name
- Dichomeris chlanidota (Meyrick, 1927)

Synonyms
- Trichotaphe chlanidota Meyrick, 1927

Species of moth

Dichomeris chlanidota is a moth in the family Gelechiidae. It was described by Edward Meyrick in 1927. It is found on Sumatra in Indonesia.

The wingspan is 10–11 mm (0.39–0.43 in). The forewings are bluish grey with three fulvous-ochreous blotches, the first roundish, basal, not reaching the margins, the second at one-third, fasciate, angulated outwards below the middle, more or less distinctly reaching the dorsum but not the costa, partially infuscated (darkened) interiorly, the third from the middle of the costa, fasciate, slightly oblique, reaching two-thirds across the wing, more or less infuscated interiorly. There is a transverse fulvous-ochreous streak at two-thirds, slightly inwards oblique from the costa and rather sinuate inwards in the middle. The terminal area beyond this is blackish grey. The hindwings are grey.

The larvae feed on Acalypha boehmerioides.
