= Dichomeris amphichlora =

Scientific classification
- Kingdom: Animalia
- Phylum: Arthropoda
- Class: Insecta
- Order: Lepidoptera
- Family: Gelechiidae
- Genus: Dichomeris
- Species: D. amphichlora

Binomial name
- Dichomeris amphichlora (Meyrick, 1923)

Synonyms
- Trichotaphe amphichlora Meyrick, 1923

Species of moth

Dichomeris amphichlora is a moth of the family Gelechiidae. It was described by Edward Meyrick in 1923. It is known from north-eastern India.

The wingspan is about 16 mm. The forewings are light fuscous, the costa narrowly suffused with yellow ochreous and the stigmata faint, cloudy and slightly darker, with the plical obliquely beyond the first discal and the second discal transverse. The hindwings are rather dark grey.
