= Dichomeris pelitis =

Scientific classification
- Kingdom: Animalia
- Phylum: Arthropoda
- Class: Insecta
- Order: Lepidoptera
- Family: Gelechiidae
- Genus: Dichomeris
- Species: D. pelitis

Binomial name
- Dichomeris pelitis (Meyrick, 1913)

Synonyms
- Trichotaphe pelitis Meyrick, 1913

Species of moth

Dichomeris pelitis is a moth in the family Gelechiidae. It was described by Edward Meyrick in 1913. It is found in Assam, India.

The wingspan is 17–19 mm (0.67–0.75 in). The forewings are pale brownish ochreous with the costal edge pale ochreous yellowish. The stigmata is blackish, the discal moderate, the plical small, rather beyond the first discal. There is a small dark fuscous mark on the costa beyond the middle, and a row of dark fuscous dots around the posterior part of the costa and termen. There is also a faint pale curved subterminal line, slightly indented opposite the apex. The hindwings are fuscous.
