= Dichomeris specularis =

Scientific classification
- Kingdom: Animalia
- Phylum: Arthropoda
- Class: Insecta
- Order: Lepidoptera
- Family: Gelechiidae
- Genus: Dichomeris
- Species: D. specularis

Binomial name
- Dichomeris specularis (Meyrick, 1918)

Synonyms
- Battaristis specularis Meyrick, 1918

Species of moth

Dichomeris specularis is a moth in the family Gelechiidae. It was described by Edward Meyrick in 1918. It is found in southern India and Sri Lanka.

The wingspan is 8–9 mm (0.31–0.35 in). The forewings are pale grey with a dark fuscous dot in the disc at one-fourth. The stigmata are dark fuscous, with the plical beneath the first discal and a dorsal dot beneath the second discal. There is also a curved or bent whitish line from three-fourths of the costa to the tornus, with the apical area beyond this dark purplish grey. The hindwings are grey.
