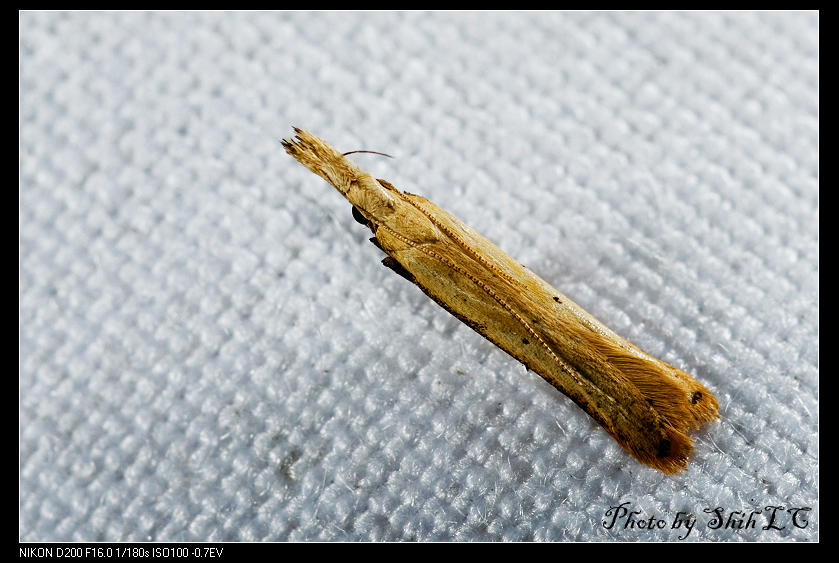

Scientific classification
- Kingdom: Animalia
- Phylum: Arthropoda
- Class: Insecta
- Order: Lepidoptera
- Family: Gelechiidae
- Genus: Dichomeris
- Species: D. summata

Binomial name
- Dichomeris summata Meyrick, 1913

= Dichomeris summata =

Species of moth

Dichomeris summata is a moth in the family Gelechiidae. It was described by Edward Meyrick in 1913. It is found in Assam in India, Yunnan in China and in Taiwan.

The wingspan is 12–16 mm (0.47–0.63 in). The forewings are whitish ochreous or yellow ochreous, sometimes strewn with strigulae of fuscous irroration (sprinkles). There is a streak of dark fuscous suffusion or irroration along the costa from the base to four-fifths and a black dot beneath the costa near the base. The stigmata are black, with the discal approximated, the plical often little marked, beneath the first discal. There is a small apical spot of dark fuscous suffusion. The hindwings are pale grey, thinly scaled anteriorly.
