= Dichomeris imbricata =

Scientific classification
- Kingdom: Animalia
- Phylum: Arthropoda
- Class: Insecta
- Order: Lepidoptera
- Family: Gelechiidae
- Genus: Dichomeris
- Species: D. imbricata

Binomial name
- Dichomeris imbricata Meyrick, 1913

Species of moth

Dichomeris imbricata is a moth in the family Gelechiidae. It was described by Edward Meyrick in 1913. It is found in southern India and Guangdong, China.

The wingspan is 19–20 mm (0.75–0.79 in). The forewings are brown somewhat mixed with whitish ochreous and with a whitish-ochreous patch occupying the apical fourth of the costa. The anterior two-thirds of the costa is suffused with blackish, obliquely strigulated with pale ochreous. The stigmata is blackish, ill defined, with the discal approximated and the plical near beyond the first discal. There is also some blackish suffusion on the dorsum towards the tornus, a blackish dot on the tornus and one on the termen beneath the apex. The hindwings are grey, with the veins and termen darker.
