= Dichomeris bispotalis =

Scientific classification
- Domain: Eukaryota
- Kingdom: Animalia
- Phylum: Arthropoda
- Class: Insecta
- Order: Lepidoptera
- Family: Gelechiidae
- Genus: Dichomeris
- Species: D. bispotalis

Binomial name
- Dichomeris bispotalis Walia and Wadhawan, 2004

Species of moth

Dichomeris bispotalis is a moth in the family Gelechiidae. It was described by Walia and Wadhawan in 2004. It is found in India.
