= Aphanostola intercepta =

Scientific classification
- Kingdom: Animalia
- Phylum: Arthropoda
- Class: Insecta
- Order: Lepidoptera
- Family: Gelechiidae
- Genus: Aphanostola
- Species: A. intercepta

Binomial name
- Aphanostola intercepta Meyrick, 1932

Species of moth

Aphanostola intercepta is a species of moth in the family Gelechiidae. It was described by Edward Meyrick in 1932. It is found in Bihar in eastern India.
