= Semnostoma barathrota =

Scientific classification
- Domain: Eukaryota
- Kingdom: Animalia
- Phylum: Arthropoda
- Class: Insecta
- Order: Lepidoptera
- Family: Gelechiidae
- Genus: Semnostoma
- Species: S. barathrota

Binomial name
- Semnostoma barathrota Meyrick, 1918

Species of moth

Semnostoma barathrota is a moth of the family Gelechiidae. It was described by Edward Meyrick in 1918. It is found in Assam, India.

The wingspan is about 14 mm. The forewings are dark fuscous with a whitish blotch along the basal fourth of the dorsum and a grey-whitish blotch, white on the anterior edge, extending along the posterior half of the dorsum and termen to near the apex, widest above the tornus, where it reaches three-fourths of the way across the wing, including a fine black longitudinal line in the disc in the posterior portion, its posterior end occupied by a blotch of grey suffusion. There is an oblique blue-leaden-metallic line from four-fifths of the costa to just beyond this blotch. The apical area beyond this is brownish, with three whitish costal dots separated by dark fuscous, the last edging a black pre-apical dot. The hindwings are bluish grey.
