= Dichomeris hortulana =

Scientific classification
- Kingdom: Animalia
- Phylum: Arthropoda
- Class: Insecta
- Order: Lepidoptera
- Family: Gelechiidae
- Genus: Dichomeris
- Species: D. hortulana

Binomial name
- Dichomeris hortulana (Meyrick, 1918)

Synonyms
- Trichotaphe hortulana Meyrick, 1918; Cymotricha tetraschema Meyrick, 1931; Dichomeris ceponoma Meyrick, 1918

Species of moth

Dichomeris hortulana is a moth in the family Gelechiidae. It was described by Edward Meyrick in 1918. It is found in India, South Africa, the Seychelles, where it has been recorded from Silhouette and Mahé as well as Mauritius and Mayotte.

The wingspan is about 12 mm. The forewings are dark iron grey with fulvous-ochreous markings and an irregular basal patch, not reaching the costa. There is a transverse fasciate blotch from the dorsum before the middle, edged with lighter, the apex rounded, not reaching the costa. There is also an outwards-oblique fasciate blotch from the middle of the costa, edged with lighter, reaching two-thirds of the way across the wing, towards the costa suffused with blackish. There is a straight slightly inwards-oblique transverse line from the costa at three-fourths, the apical area beyond this suffused with blackish, with cloudy black marginal dots. The hindwings are dark grey.
