= Parachronistis destillans =

Scientific classification
- Kingdom: Animalia
- Phylum: Arthropoda
- Class: Insecta
- Order: Lepidoptera
- Family: Gelechiidae
- Genus: Parachronistis
- Species: P. destillans

Binomial name
- Parachronistis destillans (Meyrick, 1918)

Synonyms
- Telphusa destillans Meyrick, 1918

Species of moth

Parachronistis destillans is a moth of the family Gelechiidae. It is found in India (Assam).

The wingspan is 12–13 mm. The forewings are white with an oblique black fascia from the costa near the base, reaching to below the fold, the dorsal area beneath this tinged yellow. There is a triangular black blotch extending over the median third of the costa and reaching two-thirds across the wing, containing a small white spot beneath the middle of the costa. There is a yellow spot beneath its apex, and one in the disc at two-thirds, accompanied by a few black specks and an oblique triangular black spot is found on the tornus, surmounted by a suffused yellowish spot. There is also an elongate-triangular black spot on the costa towards the apex and an irregular black apical dot, and two or three on the termen. The hindwings are light grey.
