= Dichomeris cymatodes =

Scientific classification
- Kingdom: Animalia
- Phylum: Arthropoda
- Class: Insecta
- Order: Lepidoptera
- Family: Gelechiidae
- Genus: Dichomeris
- Species: D. cymatodes

Binomial name
- Dichomeris cymatodes (Meyrick, 1916)

Synonyms
- Trichotaphe cymatodes Meyrick, 1916

Species of moth

Dichomeris cymatodes is a moth in the family Gelechiidae. It was described by Edward Meyrick in 1916. It is found in the Indian state of Assam, Hong Kong, Guizhou and Hunan in China and in Taiwan.

The wingspan is 13-13.5 mm. The forewings are pale brownish ochreous. The first discal stigma is moderate, dark brown, conspicuous, the plical hardly indicated, beneath the first discal, the second discal only indicated by a faint brownish line running from its position to the dorsum before the tornus. There is a dark brown elongate mark on the costa beyond the middle, as well as a marginal series of small dark fuscous dots around the posterior part of the costa and termen. The hindwings of the males are light grey, paler anteriorly, while they are rather dark grey in females.
