= Brachmia sitiens =

Scientific classification
- Kingdom: Animalia
- Phylum: Arthropoda
- Clade: Pancrustacea
- Class: Insecta
- Order: Lepidoptera
- Family: Gelechiidae
- Genus: Brachmia
- Species: B. sitiens

Binomial name
- Brachmia sitiens Meyrick, 1918

Synonyms
- Apethistis sitiens (Meyrick, 1918)

Species of moth

Brachmia sitiens is a moth in the family Gelechiidae endemic to southern India. It was described by Edward Meyrick in 1918.

The wingspan is 18–19 mm. The forewings are light greyish-ochreous irrorated with rather dark fuscous. The stigmata are cloudy, dark fuscous, the plical somewhat before the first discal. A faint irregular transverse shade extends from the second stigmata to the dorsum, with traces of cloudy submarginal dots around the apex and termen. The hindwings are pale grey.
