= Brachmia inspersa =

Scientific classification
- Domain: Eukaryota
- Kingdom: Animalia
- Phylum: Arthropoda
- Class: Insecta
- Order: Lepidoptera
- Family: Gelechiidae
- Genus: Brachmia
- Species: B. inspersa

Binomial name
- Brachmia inspersa Meyrick, 1921

Synonyms
- Apethistis inspersa (Meyrick, 1921)

Species of moth

Brachmia inspersa is a moth in the family Gelechiidae. It was described by Edward Meyrick in 1921. It is found in Assam, India.

The wingspan is about 20 mm. The forewings are brownish ochreous speckled with fuscous, with the costal edge brighter ochreous. The stigmata is dark fuscous, the plical beneath the first discal. There is a pre-marginal series of cloudy subconfluent dots of dark fuscous irroration around the apex and termen. The hindwings are grey, speckled darker.
