= Dichomeris intensa =

Scientific classification
- Kingdom: Animalia
- Phylum: Arthropoda
- Class: Insecta
- Order: Lepidoptera
- Family: Gelechiidae
- Genus: Dichomeris
- Species: D. intensa

Binomial name
- Dichomeris intensa Meyrick, 1913

Species of moth

Dichomeris intensa is a moth in the family Gelechiidae. It was described by Edward Meyrick in 1913. It is found in southern India, Sri Lanka and Vietnam.

The wingspan is 11–14 mm (0.43–0.55 in). The forewings are brownish, variably sprinkled or irrorated with dark fuscous and with the costa more or less broadly and irregularly suffused with dark leaden fuscous from the base to near the apex, sometimes marked with several fine oblique pale strigulae towards the middle. There is a narrow dark leaden-fuscous terminal fascia, preceded on the costa by a small pale ochreous patch, these markings limited anteriorly by an angulated pale ochreous or brownish transverse line sprinkled with dark fuscous. The hindwings are dark grey, in males thinly scaled and violet subhyaline (almost glass like) in the disc.
