= Dichomeris crepitatrix =

Scientific classification
- Kingdom: Animalia
- Phylum: Arthropoda
- Class: Insecta
- Order: Lepidoptera
- Family: Gelechiidae
- Genus: Dichomeris
- Species: D. crepitatrix

Binomial name
- Dichomeris crepitatrix Meyrick, 1913

Species of moth

Dichomeris crepitatrix is a moth in the family Gelechiidae. It was described by Edward Meyrick in 1913. It is found in southern India.

The wingspan is about 15 mm (0.59 in). The forewings are ochreous brown, with scattered dark fuscous scales and a blackish streak irregularly interrupted and spotted with ground colour extending along the costa from the base to three-fourths. The stigmata are undefined, fuscous, with the discal approximated, the plical rather before the first discal. A streak of blackish irroration (sprinkles) runs along the termen, suffused with grey anteriorly. The hindwings are iridescent grey.
