= Dichomeris procrossa =

Scientific classification
- Kingdom: Animalia
- Phylum: Arthropoda
- Class: Insecta
- Order: Lepidoptera
- Family: Gelechiidae
- Genus: Dichomeris
- Species: D. procrossa

Binomial name
- Dichomeris procrossa (Meyrick, 1913)

Synonyms
- Trichotaphe procrossa Meyrick, 1913

Species of moth

Dichomeris procrossa is a moth in the family Gelechiidae. It was described by Edward Meyrick in 1913. It is found in southern India.

The wingspan is about 22 mm (0.87 in). The forewings are brown mixed with fuscous and with the costal edge yellow ochreous from the base to a narrow blackish spot extending along the median fourth of the costa. The stigmata are small, blackish, the discal approximated, the plical very obliquely before the first discal. There is a very obscure brownish-ochreous obtusely angulated line crossing the wing from the posterior extremity of the blackish costal spot to the dorsum before the tornus and there are some small indistinct dark fuscous dots on the posterior part of the costa and termen. The hindwings are grey, darker posteriorly.
