= Dichomeris decusella =

Scientific classification
- Kingdom: Animalia
- Phylum: Arthropoda
- Class: Insecta
- Order: Lepidoptera
- Family: Gelechiidae
- Genus: Dichomeris
- Species: D. decusella

Binomial name
- Dichomeris decusella (Walker, 1864)

Synonyms
- Gaesa decusella Walker, 1864; Gelechia alternella Walker, 1864; Hypsolophus granti Walsingham, 1900; Hypsolophus thoracella Walsingham, 1900

Species of moth

Dichomeris decusella is a moth in the family Gelechiidae. It was described by Francis Walker in 1864. It is found in Sri Lanka, India and Yemen (Socotra).

The wingspan is 15–16 mm. The forewings are pale brownish testaceous (reddish yellow), speckled with black and with some short oblique fuscous streaks along the costa, as well as a few groups of scales at the middle and the end of the cell, as well as on the dorsum before the tornus and at the termen. There is also one erect black dorsal patch at one-sixth from the base. The hindwings are brownish grey, somewhat iridescent along the middle.
