= Dichomeris barymochla =

Scientific classification
- Kingdom: Animalia
- Phylum: Arthropoda
- Class: Insecta
- Order: Lepidoptera
- Family: Gelechiidae
- Genus: Dichomeris
- Species: D. barymochla

Binomial name
- Dichomeris barymochla (Meyrick, 1935)

Synonyms
- Desmophylax barymochla Meyrick, 1935

Species of moth

Dichomeris barymochla is a moth in the family Gelechiidae. It was described by Edward Meyrick in 1935. It is found in southern India.

The larvae feed on Helicteres isora.
