= Dichomeris sicaellus =

Scientific classification
- Domain: Eukaryota
- Kingdom: Animalia
- Phylum: Arthropoda
- Class: Insecta
- Order: Lepidoptera
- Family: Gelechiidae
- Genus: Dichomeris
- Species: D. sicaellus

Binomial name
- Dichomeris sicaellus Pathania and Rose, 2003

Species of moth

Dichomeris sicaellus is a moth in the family Gelechiidae. It is found in India (Himachal Pradesh).
