= Enthetica picryntis =

Scientific classification
- Kingdom: Animalia
- Phylum: Arthropoda
- Class: Insecta
- Order: Lepidoptera
- Family: Lecithoceridae
- Genus: Enthetica
- Species: E. picryntis

Binomial name
- Enthetica picryntis Meyrick, 1916

Species of moth

Enthetica picryntis is a moth in the family Lecithoceridae. It was described by Edward Meyrick in 1916. It is found in southern India.

The wingspan is 17–19 mm. The forewings are brownish suffused with fuscous and sprinkled with dark fuscous and blackish. The stigmata are represented by cloudy spots of dark fuscous or blackish irroration (sprinkles), the plical obliquely before the first discal, an additional spot on the fold between the first and second discal. The hindwings are grey whitish.
