= Dichomeris enoptrias =

Scientific classification
- Kingdom: Animalia
- Phylum: Arthropoda
- Class: Insecta
- Order: Lepidoptera
- Family: Gelechiidae
- Genus: Dichomeris
- Species: D. enoptrias

Binomial name
- Dichomeris enoptrias (Meyrick, 1911)

Synonyms
- Strobisia enoptrias Meyrick, 1911; Hyperecta enoptrias Meyrick, 1911

Species of moth

Dichomeris enoptrias is a moth in the family Gelechiidae. It was described by Edward Meyrick in 1911. It is found in Assam, India.

The wingspan is 14–16 mm (0.55–0.63 in). The forewings are bronzy fuscous with a very broad leaden-metallic streak along the costa from the base to one-third, and one less broad along the dorsum from the base to near the middle, confluent at the base, and with their posterior extremities connected by an angulated bar. There is also a broad slightly curved leaden-metallic fascia from the middle of costa to two-thirds of the dorsum, as well as an oblique white strigula on the costa at two-thirds. A broad leaden-metallic terminal fascia is narrowed to the tornus, marked with a whitish-ochreous dash from the apex. The hindwings are dark fuscous, more blackish fuscous posteriorly.
