= Dichomeris citharista =

Scientific classification
- Kingdom: Animalia
- Phylum: Arthropoda
- Class: Insecta
- Order: Lepidoptera
- Family: Gelechiidae
- Genus: Dichomeris
- Species: D. citharista

Binomial name
- Dichomeris citharista (Meyrick, 1913)

Synonyms
- Nothris citharista Meyrick, 1913

Species of moth

Dichomeris citharista is a moth in the family Gelechiidae. It was described by Edward Meyrick in 1913. It is found in southern India.

The wingspan is 12–14 mm (0.47–0.55 in). The forewings are pale whitish ochreous, sprinkled with grey or fuscous and with the costa dark fuscous towards the base. There is an indistinct dark fuscous dot on the fold beyond one-fourth and one obliquely beneath and before this. The stigmata are small, black, accompanied with some ferruginous or fuscous scales, the discal approximated, the plical beneath the first discal, the second discal placed on a slender transverse fuscous fascia, sometimes ferruginous mixed and expanded anteriorly on the costa. The posterior area is more or less streaked longitudinally with dark fuscous. The hindwings are grey, thinly scaled anteriorly and with the veins and termen darker suffused.
