= Brachmia consummata =

Scientific classification
- Domain: Eukaryota
- Kingdom: Animalia
- Phylum: Arthropoda
- Class: Insecta
- Order: Lepidoptera
- Family: Gelechiidae
- Genus: Brachmia
- Species: B. consummata

Binomial name
- Brachmia consummata Meyrick, 1923

Synonyms
- Apethistis consummata (Meyrick, 1923)

Species of moth

Brachmia consummata is a moth in the family Gelechiidae. It was described by Edward Meyrick in 1923. It is found in Assam, India.

The wingspan is 16–19 mm. The forewings are ochreous, more or less sprinkled with fuscous. The stigmata is black, the plical beneath the first discal and there is a small cloudy spot or short inwards-oblique streak of fuscous suffusion from the dorsum towards the tornus, as well as a submarginal series of small irregular blackish dots around the apex and termen. The hindwings are light ochreous greyish.
