= Dichomeris fungifera =

Scientific classification
- Kingdom: Animalia
- Phylum: Arthropoda
- Class: Insecta
- Order: Lepidoptera
- Family: Gelechiidae
- Genus: Dichomeris
- Species: D. fungifera

Binomial name
- Dichomeris fungifera (Meyrick, 1913)

Synonyms
- Trichotaphe fungifera Meyrick, 1913

Species of moth

Dichomeris fungifera is a moth in the family Gelechiidae. It was described by Edward Meyrick in 1913. It is found in Assam in India, northern Vietnam and Jiangxi, China.

The wingspan is about 22 mm (0.87 in). The forewings are fuscous, partially tinged with reddish brown and with a pale whitish-green dot on the fold near the base, and a spot on the dorsum at one-fourth. The discal stigmata is pale whitish green, approximated, with the plical larger, rather dark fuscous mixed with pale whitish green, very obliquely before the first discal. There is also a very obscure pale obtusely angulated shade crossing the wing from two-thirds of the costa to the dorsum before the tornus, as well as some minute dark fuscous dots on the posterior part of the costa and termen. The hindwings are rather dark grey.
