= Semnostoma scatebrosa =

Scientific classification
- Domain: Eukaryota
- Kingdom: Animalia
- Phylum: Arthropoda
- Class: Insecta
- Order: Lepidoptera
- Family: Gelechiidae
- Genus: Semnostoma
- Species: S. scatebrosa

Binomial name
- Semnostoma scatebrosa Meyrick, 1918

Species of moth

Semnostoma scatebrosa is a moth of the family Gelechiidae. It was described by Edward Meyrick in 1918. It is found in Assam, India.

The wingspan is about 12 mm. The forewings are dark fuscous with a broad white dorsal stripe, irregularly sprinkled with dark fuscous, from the base to near the tornus, the upper edge angularly emarginated before the middle, then irregular, projecting on the end of the cell, posteriorly narrowed and suffused. There is a short leaden dash above the tornus and a leaden-metallic streak along the upper part of the termen. There is also a black subapical dot. The hindwings are grey.
