= Dichomeris illicita =

Scientific classification
- Kingdom: Animalia
- Phylum: Arthropoda
- Class: Insecta
- Order: Lepidoptera
- Family: Gelechiidae
- Genus: Dichomeris
- Species: D. illicita

Binomial name
- Dichomeris illicita (Meyrick, 1929)

Synonyms
- Cymotricha illicita Meyrick, 1929

Species of moth

Dichomeris illicita is a moth in the family Gelechiidae. It was described by Edward Meyrick in 1929. It is found in Assam, India. They generally have a wingspan of about 11 mm (0.43 in).
