= Dichomeris leucothicta =

Scientific classification
- Kingdom: Animalia
- Phylum: Arthropoda
- Class: Insecta
- Order: Lepidoptera
- Family: Gelechiidae
- Genus: Dichomeris
- Species: D. leucothicta

Binomial name
- Dichomeris leucothicta Meyrick, 1919

Species of moth

Dichomeris leucothicta is a moth in the family Gelechiidae. It was described by Edward Meyrick in 1919. It is found in southern India.

The wingspan is about 20 mm (0.79 in). The forewings are rosy brown with the costal edge ochreous yellow, at the base blackish. The stigmata are small, blackish and edged posteriorly (and at the second discal also anteriorly) with white, the plical beneath the first discal. The hindwings are grey.
