= Dichomeris sciritis =

Scientific classification
- Kingdom: Animalia
- Phylum: Arthropoda
- Class: Insecta
- Order: Lepidoptera
- Family: Gelechiidae
- Genus: Dichomeris
- Species: D. sciritis

Binomial name
- Dichomeris sciritis (Meyrick, 1918)

Synonyms
- Brachyacma sciritis Meyrick, 1918; Cymotricha sciritis; Trichotaphe sciritis; Oxysactis sciritis

Species of moth

Dichomeris sciritis is a moth of the family Gelechiidae. It is found in Chennai, India.

The wingspan is about 11 mm. The forewings are brownish-ochreous, with the base of costal edge dark fuscous and with a white costal line from the base to the middle, thence continued around the margin of a fine elongate wedge-shaped dark fuscous mark lying along the costa beyond the middle, its acute end anterior. There is a small black whitish-edged apical dot. The hindwings are grey.
