= Dichomeris albiscripta =

Scientific classification
- Kingdom: Animalia
- Phylum: Arthropoda
- Class: Insecta
- Order: Lepidoptera
- Family: Gelechiidae
- Genus: Dichomeris
- Species: D. albiscripta

Binomial name
- Dichomeris albiscripta (Meyrick, 1914)

Synonyms
- Hypelictis albiscripta Meyrick, 1914

Species of moth

Dichomeris albiscripta is a moth of the family Gelechiidae. It was described by Edward Meyrick in 1914. It is known from southern India.

The wingspan is about 14 mm. The forewings are dark slaty fuscous, with violet reflections. The veins are sprinkled with blackish and the stigmata are small, whitish and with the plical beneath the first discal. There is a very fine interrupted whitish line from three-fourths of the costa to the tornus, obtusely angulated above the middle and there is a pale ochreous apical patch, with the anterior edge nearly straight, enclosing two or three dark-grey longitudinal marks. The hindwings are light-bronzy fuscous.
