= Dichomeris aprica =

Scientific classification
- Kingdom: Animalia
- Phylum: Arthropoda
- Class: Insecta
- Order: Lepidoptera
- Family: Gelechiidae
- Genus: Dichomeris
- Species: D. aprica

Binomial name
- Dichomeris aprica (Meyrick, 1913)

Synonyms
- Paraspistes aprica Meyrick, 1913; Brachyacma aprica

Species of moth

Dichomeris aprica is a moth of the family Gelechiidae. It was described by Edward Meyrick in 1913. It is known from Karnataka in southern India.

The wingspan is about 10 mm. The forewings are yellow ochreous, tinged with ferruginous and with several short oblique blackish strigulae on the costa between one-third and three-fourths. The dorsal half is obscurely suffused with ferruginous and irrorated (sprinkled) with fuscous. The hindwings are dark grey, but lighter and thinly scaled anteriorly.
