= Dichomeris centracma =

Scientific classification
- Kingdom: Animalia
- Phylum: Arthropoda
- Class: Insecta
- Order: Lepidoptera
- Family: Gelechiidae
- Genus: Dichomeris
- Species: D. centracma

Binomial name
- Dichomeris centracma (Meyrick, 1923)

Synonyms
- Trichotaphe centracma Meyrick, 1923; Rhinosia richteri Amsel, 1959

Species of moth

Dichomeris centracma is a moth in the family Gelechiidae. It was described by Edward Meyrick in 1923. It is found in Iran and southern India.

The wingspan is about 12 mm (0.47 in). The forewings are light grey finely speckled with white and with the costal edge finely white except towards the apex. The stigmata are cloudy, with the dark grey plical obliquely beyond the first discal, the second discal forming an oblique mark. There is an elongate black mark on the costa beyond the middle, pointed anteriorly, as well as a small black apical dot. The hindwings are light grey.
