= Dichomeris viridella =

Scientific classification
- Kingdom: Animalia
- Phylum: Arthropoda
- Class: Insecta
- Order: Lepidoptera
- Family: Gelechiidae
- Genus: Dichomeris
- Species: D. viridella

Binomial name
- Dichomeris viridella (Snellen, 1901)

Synonyms
- Gelechia viridella Snellen, 1901

Species of moth

Dichomeris viridella is a moth in the family Gelechiidae. It was described by Snellen in 1901. It is found on Java.

The wingspan is about 18 mm (0.71 in). The forewings are green, but whitish at the margins and a triangular blackish-brown mark in the middle. The hindwings are uniform dark grey.
