= Dichomeris sciodora =

Scientific classification
- Kingdom: Animalia
- Phylum: Arthropoda
- Class: Insecta
- Order: Lepidoptera
- Family: Gelechiidae
- Genus: Dichomeris
- Species: D. sciodora

Binomial name
- Dichomeris sciodora Meyrick, 1922

Species of moth

Dichomeris sciodora is a moth in the family Gelechiidae. It was described by Edward Meyrick in 1922. It is found in Assam, India.

The wingspan is about 13 mm (0.51 in). The forewings are pale ochreous yellowish, with the costa minutely strigulated with blackish from the base to three small blackish marks at two-thirds. There is some grey sprinkling along the dorsum and a roundish spot of greyish suffusion in the disc at one-fifth. The stigmata is dark fuscous, the plical beneath the first discal. There is also a transverse median patch of light greyish suffusion crossing the wing but not reaching the costa, as well as some greyish strigulation crossing the wing at three-fourths. There is an irregular terminal streak of blackish-grey mottling, thickest below the apex. The hindwings are grey.
