= Hypatima tephroptila =

Scientific classification
- Domain: Eukaryota
- Kingdom: Animalia
- Phylum: Arthropoda
- Class: Insecta
- Order: Lepidoptera
- Family: Gelechiidae
- Genus: Hypatima
- Species: H. tephroptila

Binomial name
- Hypatima tephroptila (Meyrick, 1931)

Synonyms
- Chelaria tephroptila Meyrick, 1931

Species of moth

Hypatima tephroptila is a moth in the family Gelechiidae. It was described by Edward Meyrick in 1931. It is found in southern India.
