= Mnesistega convexa =

Scientific classification
- Kingdom: Animalia
- Phylum: Arthropoda
- Class: Insecta
- Order: Lepidoptera
- Family: Gelechiidae
- Genus: Mnesistega
- Species: M. convexa

Binomial name
- Mnesistega convexa Meyrick, 1923

Species of moth

Mnesistega convexa is a moth in the family Gelechiidae. It was described by Edward Meyrick in 1923. It is found in Assam, India.

The wingspan is 18–20 mm. The forewings are light fulvous ochreous, slightly sprinkled with dark fuscous, the costa more irrorated (sprinkled) with dark fuscous, more strongly and suffusedly towards the base. There is a moderate dark purple-fuscous basal patch, widened upwards but not reaching the costa. The plical and first discal stigmata are cloudy and rather dark fuscous, with the plical rather obliquely posterior and the second discal and a spot on the dorsum united to form an irregular nearly direct rather dark purplish-fuscous streak. The hindwings are light ochreous grey.
