= Enthetica tribrachia =

Scientific classification
- Kingdom: Animalia
- Phylum: Arthropoda
- Class: Insecta
- Order: Lepidoptera
- Family: Lecithoceridae
- Genus: Enthetica
- Species: E. tribrachia

Binomial name
- Enthetica tribrachia Meyrick, 1923

Species of moth

Enthetica tribrachia is a moth in the family Lecithoceridae. It was described by Edward Meyrick in 1923. It is found in southern India.

The wingspan is 14–15 mm. The forewings are light brownish ochreous in males and fuscous in females. The stigmata form elongate dark fuscous marks, the plical obliquely before the first discal. The hindwings are pale grey.
