= Dichomeris excoriata =

Scientific classification
- Kingdom: Animalia
- Phylum: Arthropoda
- Class: Insecta
- Order: Lepidoptera
- Family: Gelechiidae
- Genus: Dichomeris
- Species: D. excoriata

Binomial name
- Dichomeris excoriata Meyrick, 1913

Species of moth

Dichomeris excoriata is a moth in the family Gelechiidae. It was described by Edward Meyrick in 1913. It is found in Assam, India.

The wingspan is about 22 mm (0.87 in). The forewings are pale ochreous, suffusedly strigulated with brownish except towards the costa anteriorly and with a few blackish scales. There are about ten black marks on the anterior half of the costa, anteriorly remote, posteriorly closely approximated. There is also a spot of brownish suffusion in the disc at one-fourth and an undefined triangular patch of brownish suffusion extending on the costa, from about the middle to four-fifths, its apex formed by a dark fuscous second discal stigma. There are some dark fuscous dots on the termen. The hindwings are iridescent grey with the veins darker.
