= Dichomeris allantopa =

Scientific classification
- Kingdom: Animalia
- Phylum: Arthropoda
- Class: Insecta
- Order: Lepidoptera
- Family: Gelechiidae
- Genus: Dichomeris
- Species: D. allantopa

Binomial name
- Dichomeris allantopa Meyrick, 1934

Species of moth

Dichomeris allantopa is a moth of the family Gelechiidae. It was described by Edward Meyrick in 1934. It is known from southern India.

The larvae feed on Dalbergia sissoides.
