= Nealyda panchromatica =

Scientific classification
- Kingdom: Animalia
- Phylum: Arthropoda
- Class: Insecta
- Order: Lepidoptera
- Family: Gelechiidae
- Genus: Nealyda
- Species: N. panchromatica

Binomial name
- Nealyda panchromatica (Meyrick, 1926)

Synonyms
- Aristotelia panchromatica Meyrick, 1926

Species of moth

Nealyda panchromatica is a moth of the family Gelechiidae. It was described by Edward Meyrick in 1926. It is found in Assam, India.

The wingspan is about 10 mm. The forewings are iridescent dark golden bronzy fuscous with shining violet-leaden-metallic markings. There is a basal fascia, a rather curved narrow fascia at one-fourth, transverse spots on the costa at the middle and three-fourths, and one on the dorsum before the first of these. There is also an inwards-oblique streak from the tornus, nearly reaching the median costal spot, as well as a slender streak along the lower part of the termen. The hindwings are dark bronzy-fuscous.
