= Dichomeris brachygrapha =

Scientific classification
- Kingdom: Animalia
- Phylum: Arthropoda
- Class: Insecta
- Order: Lepidoptera
- Family: Gelechiidae
- Genus: Dichomeris
- Species: D. brachygrapha

Binomial name
- Dichomeris brachygrapha Meyrick, 1920

Species of moth

Dichomeris brachygrapha is a moth in the family Gelechiidae. It was described by Edward Meyrick in 1920. It is found in Assam, India.

The wingspan is about 12 mm (0.47 in). The forewings are whitish ochreous with a fine black streak along the basal fifth of the costa, a black linear mark before the middle and a short blackish streak beyond the middle, and a narrow semi-oval spot at three-fourths. The discal stigmata are very small and black and there are several small indistinct spots of ochreous suffusion towards the dorsum, as well as some indistinct fuscous dots on the termen. The hindwings are grey.
