= Scrobipalpa blapsigona =

Scientific classification
- Kingdom: Animalia
- Phylum: Arthropoda
- Class: Insecta
- Order: Lepidoptera
- Family: Gelechiidae
- Genus: Scrobipalpa
- Species: S. blapsigona

Binomial name
- Scrobipalpa blapsigona (Meyrick, 1916)

Synonyms
- Phthorimaea blapsigona Meyrick, 1916

Species of moth

Scrobipalpa blapsigona is a moth in the family Gelechiidae. It was described by Edward Meyrick in 1916. It is found in southern India and Bengal.

The wingspan is 13–14 mm (0.51–0.55 in). The forewings are whitish ochreous, largely suffusedly streaked with brownish ochreous, and irregularly sprinkled with blackish. The stigmata are small, cloudy and blackish, the plical beneath the first discal. There is a small cloudy spot of blackish sprinkles on the costa at two-thirds. The hindwings are pale grey, more or less whitish tinged anteriorly.

The larvae feed on the buds of Solanum melongena.
