= Dendrophilia stictocosma =

Scientific classification
- Kingdom: Animalia
- Phylum: Arthropoda
- Class: Insecta
- Order: Lepidoptera
- Family: Gelechiidae
- Genus: Dentrophilia
- Species: D. stictocosma

Binomial name
- Dendrophilia stictocosma (Meyrick, 1920)

Synonyms
- Chelaria stictocosma Meyrick, 1920; Chelaria levata Meyrick, 1920

Species of moth

Dendrophilia stictocosma is a moth of the family Gelechiidae. It was described by Edward Meyrick in 1920. It is found in southern India.

The wingspan is 9–10 mm. The forewings are pale ochreous largely suffused with whitish, especially towards the costa anteriorly. There is a black dot beneath the costa near the base, as well as small black marks on the costa at one-fifth, one-third and the middle, and two or three more or less marked posteriorly. The discal stigmata are small, black, the plical forming an irregular blackish spot obliquely before the first discal, sometimes preceded by yellowish suffusion, above this a roundish space preceding the first discal is more or less perceptibly outlined with dark grey scales, and sometimes tinged grey. There is a slight blackish strigula on the end of the fold. The hindwings are light bluish grey.
