= Dichomeris geochrota =

Scientific classification
- Kingdom: Animalia
- Phylum: Arthropoda
- Class: Insecta
- Order: Lepidoptera
- Family: Gelechiidae
- Genus: Dichomeris
- Species: D. geochrota

Binomial name
- Dichomeris geochrota (Meyrick, 1914)

Synonyms
- Trichotaphe geochrota Meyrick, 1914

Species of moth

Dichomeris geochrota is a moth in the family Gelechiidae. It was described by Edward Meyrick in 1914. It is found in southern India.

The wingspan is about 13 mm (0.51 in). The forewings are light ashy grey irrorated (sprinkled) with fuscous, with the extreme costal edge ochreous whitish. There is a cloudy dark-brown dot in the disc at one-fourth. The stigmata is dark brown, obscure, the discal approximated, the plical hardly before the first discal, the second discal connected with the dorsum by an irregular dark brown line. There is a fine indistinct irregular ochreous-whitish transverse line at four-fifths, forming a small distinct spot on the costa and there are also several blackish dots around the apex and termen. The hindwings are grey.
