= Mesophleps ioloncha =

Scientific classification
- Kingdom: Animalia
- Phylum: Arthropoda
- Class: Insecta
- Order: Lepidoptera
- Family: Gelechiidae
- Genus: Mesophleps
- Species: M. ioloncha

Binomial name
- Mesophleps ioloncha (Meyrick, 1905)

Synonyms
- Paraspistes ioloncha Meyrick, 1905; Stiphrostola longinqua Meyrick, 1923; Brachyacma trychota Meyrick, 1929

Species of moth

Mesophleps ioloncha is a moth of the family Gelechiidae. It is found in India, Sri Lanka, Thailand, China (Anhui, Gansu, Henan, Shaanxi, Zhejiang), Taiwan, Indonesia, the Solomon Islands and the Philippines.

The wingspan is 8.5–17.5 mm.

The larvae feed on Tephrosia candida, Tephrosia purpurea and Crotalaria juncea. They feed in the pods.
