= Ephysteris subcaerulea =

Scientific classification
- Kingdom: Animalia
- Phylum: Arthropoda
- Class: Insecta
- Order: Lepidoptera
- Family: Gelechiidae
- Genus: Ephysteris
- Species: E. subcaerulea

Binomial name
- Ephysteris subcaerulea (Meyrick, 1918)

Synonyms
- Phthorimaea subcaerulea Meyrick, 1918; Aristotelia paraleuca Meyrick, 1929

Species of moth

Ephysteris subcaerulea is a moth in the family Gelechiidae. It was described by Edward Meyrick in 1918. It is found in southern India.

The wingspan is about 9 mm. The forewings are whitish, irregularly sprinkled with grey with some blackish scales, posteriorly tending to form interneural streaks. There is a distinct white submedian streak from the base to the tornus. The stigmata are black, the plical rather obliquely before the first discal, the second discal large and roundish. The hindwings are pale bluish.
