= Helcystogramma arotraeum =

Scientific classification
- Kingdom: Animalia
- Phylum: Arthropoda
- Class: Insecta
- Order: Lepidoptera
- Family: Gelechiidae
- Genus: Helcystogramma
- Species: H. arotraeum

Binomial name
- Helcystogramma arotraeum (Meyrick, 1894)

Synonyms
- Cladodes arotraea Meyrick, 1894; Brachmia arotraea Meyrick, 1911; Helcystogramma arotraea Robinson et al., 1994

Species of moth

Helcystogramma arotraeum is a moth in the family Gelechiidae. It was described by Edward Meyrick in 1894. It is known from Japan, Taiwan, China (Hainan, Jiangxi, Yunnan), Myanmar, Thailand, northeastern India, Sri Lanka, Malaysia, and Indonesia.

The wingspan is 11–14 mm. The forewings are pale whitish ochreous, all veins suffusedly margined with dark fuscous and with a round black dot in the disc at two-fifths, a second nearly beneath it on the fold, and a third in disc at three-fifths. There is a small suffused blackish apical spot. The hindwings are pale grey.

The larvae feed on the rice plant Oryza sativa and Manchurian wild rice (Zizania latifolia).
