= Dichomeris ferruginosa =

Scientific classification
- Kingdom: Animalia
- Phylum: Arthropoda
- Class: Insecta
- Order: Lepidoptera
- Family: Gelechiidae
- Genus: Dichomeris
- Species: D. ferruginosa

Binomial name
- Dichomeris ferruginosa Meyrick, 1913

Species of moth

Dichomeris ferruginosa is a moth in the family Gelechiidae. It was described by Edward Meyrick in 1913. It is found in Assam in India, Zhejiang in China, Taiwan, Java in Indonesia and Japan.

The wingspan is 15–16 mm (0.59–0.63 in). The forewings are yellow ochreous with the costa and dorsum suffused with ferruginous and strigulated with dark leaden-fuscous irroration (sprinkles). The stigmata is black, moderately large, the discal approximated, the plical beneath the first discal. There is an oblique narrow transverse fascia of ferruginous suffusion and dark leaden-fuscous irroration crossing the wing between the first discal and plical stigmata, and there is a streak of ferruginous suffusion and dark leaden-fuscous irroration along the termen. The hindwings are grey, thinly scaled and iridescent semihyaline (almost glass like), the veins and termen suffused with darker.

The larvae feed on Sesbania grandiflora.
