= Dichomeris semnias =

Scientific classification
- Kingdom: Animalia
- Phylum: Arthropoda
- Class: Insecta
- Order: Lepidoptera
- Family: Gelechiidae
- Genus: Dichomeris
- Species: D. semnias

Binomial name
- Dichomeris semnias (Meyrick, 1926)

Synonyms
- Gaesa semnias Meyrick, 1926

Species of moth

Dichomeris semnias is a moth in the family Gelechiidae. It was described by Edward Meyrick in 1926. It is found in north-eastern India.

The wingspan is about 18 mm (0.71 in). The forewings are slaty fuscous suffusedly irrorated (sprinkled) with darker and with the anterior half of the costa dark fuscous with about eight ochreous-whitish dots. The stigmata are minute, grey whitish, the plical rather obliquely before the first discal. The hindwings are grey.
