= Dichomeris lissota =

Scientific classification
- Kingdom: Animalia
- Phylum: Arthropoda
- Class: Insecta
- Order: Lepidoptera
- Family: Gelechiidae
- Genus: Dichomeris
- Species: D. lissota

Binomial name
- Dichomeris lissota (Meyrick, 1913)

Synonyms
- Trichotaphe lissota Meyrick, 1913

Species of moth

Dichomeris lissota is a moth in the family Gelechiidae. It was described by Edward Meyrick in 1913. It is found in Assam, India.

The wingspan is about 22 mm (0.87 in). The forewings are glossy lilac brown with an oblique-oval dark ochreous-brown spot in the disc at one-third, obscurely whitish edged. There is a small round blackish-fuscous whitish-edged spot representing the second discal stigma and a dark fuscous mark along the costa from the middle to three-fourths, where a slender dark ochreous-brown fascia crosses immediately beyond the second discal stigma to the dorsum before the tornus, edged posteriorly by a pale ochreous slightly bisinuate line. A dark brown line runs along the posterior part of the costa and termen. The hindwings are rather dark fuscous.
