= Telphusa atomatma =

Scientific classification
- Domain: Eukaryota
- Kingdom: Animalia
- Phylum: Arthropoda
- Class: Insecta
- Order: Lepidoptera
- Family: Gelechiidae
- Genus: Telphusa
- Species: T. atomatma

Binomial name
- Telphusa atomatma (Meyrick, 1932)

Synonyms
- Phthorimaea atomatma Meyrick, 1932

Species of moth

Telphusa atomatma is a moth of the family Gelechiidae. It is found in India (Punjab).
