= Dichomeris cellaria =

Scientific classification
- Kingdom: Animalia
- Phylum: Arthropoda
- Class: Insecta
- Order: Lepidoptera
- Family: Gelechiidae
- Genus: Dichomeris
- Species: D. cellaria

Binomial name
- Dichomeris cellaria (Meyrick, 1913)

Synonyms
- Trichotaphe cellaria Meyrick, 1913

Species of moth

Dichomeris cellaria is a moth in the family Gelechiidae. It was described by Edward Meyrick in 1913. It is found in Assam, India.

The wingspan is 10–15 mm (0.39–0.59 in). The forewings are light bronzy fuscous, with faint purplish reflections and with a suffused ochreous-white streak along the costa from the base to two-thirds. The first discal stigma is rather large, blackish, the plical hardly indicated, below the first discal, the second discal obsolete. There is a nearly straight or slightly curved white line from three-fourths of the costa to the dorsum before the tornus, edged anteriorly with darker fuscous suffusion, and followed by a band of whitish-ochreous suffusion. A white line, marked with dark fuscous dots, runs around the posterior part of the costa and termen. The hindwings are rather dark grey.
