= Helcystogramma cyanozona =

Scientific classification
- Kingdom: Animalia
- Phylum: Arthropoda
- Class: Insecta
- Order: Lepidoptera
- Family: Gelechiidae
- Genus: Helcystogramma
- Species: H. cyanozona

Binomial name
- Helcystogramma cyanozona (Meyrick, 1923)

Synonyms
- Tricyanaula cyanozona Meyrick, 1925

Species of moth

Helcystogramma cyanozona is a moth in the family Gelechiidae. It was described by Edward Meyrick in 1923. It is known from southern India.

The wingspan is about 10 mm. The forewings are dark fuscous with purple-blue-metallic markings and slender costal and median streaks from the base to one-fourth, some yellowish suffusion between these, some blue scales on the dorsum towards the base and a somewhat oblique-transverse blotch from the costa before the middle reaching half across wing, and a longitudinal mark on the fold beneath this. There is an almost straight transverse streak at three-fifths and a small spot on the costa towards the apex, and three on the termen. The hindwings are dark grey.
