= Dichomeris doxarcha =

Scientific classification
- Kingdom: Animalia
- Phylum: Arthropoda
- Class: Insecta
- Order: Lepidoptera
- Family: Gelechiidae
- Genus: Dichomeris
- Species: D. doxarcha

Binomial name
- Dichomeris doxarcha (Meyrick, 1916)

Synonyms
- Helcystogramma doxarcha Meyrick, 1916

Species of moth

Dichomeris doxarcha is a moth in the family Gelechiidae. It was described by Edward Meyrick in 1916. It is found in Myanmar.

The wingspan is 17–18 mm (0.67–0.71 in). The forewings are deep orange with brilliant green-blue-metallic costal and median streaks from the base to the middle, the median continued obliquely downwards along the fold to near its extremity, but interrupted beneath the end of the cell. There is an oblique-elongate green-blue-metallic spot in the disc beyond the middle and a bright blue-metallic irregularly trapezoidal blotch beneath the costa at three-fourths, edged above with some blackish suffusion extending along the costa. There is also a roundish tornal blotch of dark fuscous suffusion extending over the termen to near the apex, as well as a series of short prismatic violet-blue-metallic dashes before the posterior part of the costa and termen, suffused together towards the apex of the wing. There is also a fine dark fuscous terminal line. The hindwings are blackish fuscous.
