= Pityocona bifurcatus =

Scientific classification
- Domain: Eukaryota
- Kingdom: Animalia
- Phylum: Arthropoda
- Class: Insecta
- Order: Lepidoptera
- Family: Gelechiidae
- Genus: Pityocona
- Species: P. bifurcatus

Binomial name
- Pityocona bifurcatus Wadhawan & Walia, 2006

Species of moth

Pityocona bifurcatus is a moth in the family Gelechiidae. It was described by Wadhawan and Walia in 2006. It is found in India.
