= Dichomeris cocta =

Scientific classification
- Kingdom: Animalia
- Phylum: Arthropoda
- Class: Insecta
- Order: Lepidoptera
- Family: Gelechiidae
- Genus: Dichomeris
- Species: D. cocta

Binomial name
- Dichomeris cocta (Meyrick, 1913)

Synonyms
- Trichotaphe cocta Meyrick, 1913

Species of moth

Dichomeris cocta is a moth in the family Gelechiidae. It was described by Edward Meyrick in 1913. It is found in Assam, India.

The wingspan is 17–18 mm (0.67–0.71 in). The forewings are ochreous fuscous, the costal edge suffused with yellow ochreous. The stigmata are dark fuscous, the discal approximated, the plical obliquely before the first discal. There are some dark fuscous dots around the posterior part of the costa and termen. The hindwings are grey.
