= Aphanostola atripalpis =

Scientific classification
- Kingdom: Animalia
- Phylum: Arthropoda
- Class: Insecta
- Order: Lepidoptera
- Family: Gelechiidae
- Genus: Aphanostola
- Species: A. atripalpis

Binomial name
- Aphanostola atripalpis Meyrick, 1931

Species of moth

Aphanostola atripalpis is a species of moth in the family Gelechiidae. It was described by Edward Meyrick in 1931. It is found in Bihar in eastern India.

Adults were reared from pupae found on the leaves of Acacia catechu.
