= Semnostoma poecilopa =

Scientific classification
- Domain: Eukaryota
- Kingdom: Animalia
- Phylum: Arthropoda
- Class: Insecta
- Order: Lepidoptera
- Family: Gelechiidae
- Genus: Semnostoma
- Species: S. poecilopa

Binomial name
- Semnostoma poecilopa Meyrick, 1918

Species of moth

Semnostoma poecilopa is a moth of the family Gelechiidae. It was described by Edward Meyrick in 1918. It is found in Assam, India.

The wingspan is about 13 mm. The forewings are dark fuscous, with the tips of the scales whitish, forming a fine striation. The basal area is suffusedly streaked or spotted with brassy yellow and there is an oblique white spot beneath the fold at one-fourth, as well as an oblique white streak from the middle of the dorsum to the fold, followed by a patch of brassy-yellow suffusion. A white dot or mark is found beneath the middle of the costa, and three or four in the disc beyond the middle and there is an elongate white spot in the disc at three-fourths, separated by a blackish mark from an elongate white mark beneath it. A white wedge-shaped spot is found on the tornus and a white posteriorly finely leaden-metallic-edged oblique line from four-fifths of the costa to the termen, sometimes interrupted in the middle. There is also a black subapical elongate dot, above which are two small white marks. The lower edge of the apical projection is white. The hindwings are grey, paler and bluish towards the base.
