= Dichomeris metrodes =

Scientific classification
- Kingdom: Animalia
- Phylum: Arthropoda
- Class: Insecta
- Order: Lepidoptera
- Family: Gelechiidae
- Genus: Dichomeris
- Species: D. metrodes

Binomial name
- Dichomeris metrodes Meyrick, 1913

Species of moth

Dichomeris metrodes is a moth in the family Gelechiidae. It was described by Edward Meyrick in 1913. It is found in southern India, Sri Lanka and South Africa.

The wingspan is 10–12 mm (0.39–0.47 in). The forewings are whitish ochreous, partially suffused with pale yellow ochreous tinged with grey and with a black mark on the base of the costa, and several black dots between this and three-fifths. There is a spot of blackish irroration (sprinkles) towards the dorsum at one-fourth. The stigmata are black, with the discal approximated, the plical obliquely before the first discal. A grey spot is found towards the costa before the middle, one beneath the first discal stigma, and some suffusion along the median portion of the dorsum, sometimes confluent. There is a patch of dark grey suffusion on the costa at three-fourths, and one on the dorsum beneath the second discal stigma. There is also a streak of dark grey suffusion along the termen. The hindwings are whitish grey, thinly scaled anteriorly.
