= Dichomeris malacodes =

Scientific classification
- Kingdom: Animalia
- Phylum: Arthropoda
- Class: Insecta
- Order: Lepidoptera
- Family: Gelechiidae
- Genus: Dichomeris
- Species: D. malacodes

Binomial name
- Dichomeris malacodes (Meyrick, 1910)

Synonyms
- Nothris malacodes Meyrick, 1910

Species of moth

Dichomeris malacodes is a moth in the family Gelechiidae. It was described by Edward Meyrick in 1910. It is found on Borneo and in southern India, Sri Lanka, Taiwan and Yunnan, China.

The wingspan is 10–12 mm (0.39–0.47 in). The forewings are yellow ochreous, variably spotted and blotched with fuscous except towards the costa anteriorly, especially around the stigmata, along the dorsum and termen, and towards the costa beyond the middle, but these markings are sometimes little developed. The costa is dotted with dark fuscous on the anterior half, the edge black towards the base. The stigmata is black, distinct, with the plical obliquely before the first discal. The hindwings are light grey.
