= Heteroderces oxylitha =

Scientific classification
- Kingdom: Animalia
- Phylum: Arthropoda
- Class: Insecta
- Order: Lepidoptera
- Family: Lecithoceridae
- Genus: Heteroderces
- Species: H. oxylitha

Binomial name
- Heteroderces oxylitha Meyrick, 1929

Species of moth

Heteroderces oxylitha is a moth in the family Lecithoceridae. It was described by Edward Meyrick in 1929. It is found in Assam, India.

The wingspan is 10–11 mm.
