= Dichomeris ferrata =

Scientific classification
- Kingdom: Animalia
- Phylum: Arthropoda
- Class: Insecta
- Order: Lepidoptera
- Family: Gelechiidae
- Genus: Dichomeris
- Species: D. ferrata

Binomial name
- Dichomeris ferrata Meyrick, 1913

Species of moth

Dichomeris ferrata is a moth in the family Gelechiidae. It was described by Edward Meyrick in 1913. It is found in Assam, India.

The wingspan is 15–17 mm (0.59–0.67 in). The forewings are yellow ochreous, with scattered dark fuscous scales and dark shining leaden-grey markings irrorated (sprinkled) with blackish. There is a thick streak along the costa from the base to the middle, the posterior portion dilated into a triangular blotch reaching nearly halfway across the wing. There is also a small elongate-triangular patch on the costa at about two-thirds and an inwardly oblique wedge-shaped spot on the dorsum before the tornus, reaching halfway across the wing. The stigmata is minute, dark fuscous, with the discal approximated and the plical rather before the first discal. There is also a narrow streak along the termen. The hindwings are grey, thinly scaled anteriorly.
