= Dichomeris pseudometra =

Scientific classification
- Kingdom: Animalia
- Phylum: Arthropoda
- Class: Insecta
- Order: Lepidoptera
- Family: Gelechiidae
- Genus: Dichomeris
- Species: D. pseudometra

Binomial name
- Dichomeris pseudometra (Meyrick, 1913)

Synonyms
- Trichotaphe pseudometra Meyrick, 1913

Species of moth

Dichomeris pseudometra is a moth in the family Gelechiidae. It was described by Edward Meyrick in 1913. It is found in southern India.

The wingspan is 12–13 mm (0.47–0.51 in). The forewings are pale ochreous, with some scattered fuscous or blackish scales or traces of strigulae and with the costal edge blackish at the base. There are about eight very short black strigulae on the costa between the base and an elongate black mark at two-thirds. There is also a blackish dot in the disc at one-fourth, sometimes little marked. The stigmata are blackish, the discal approximated, the first discal minute, the plical obliquely before the first discal. There is a dot of blackish suffusion on the dorsum before the tornus, as well as some indistinct dark fuscous dots around the posterior part of the costa and termen. The hindwings are grey.
