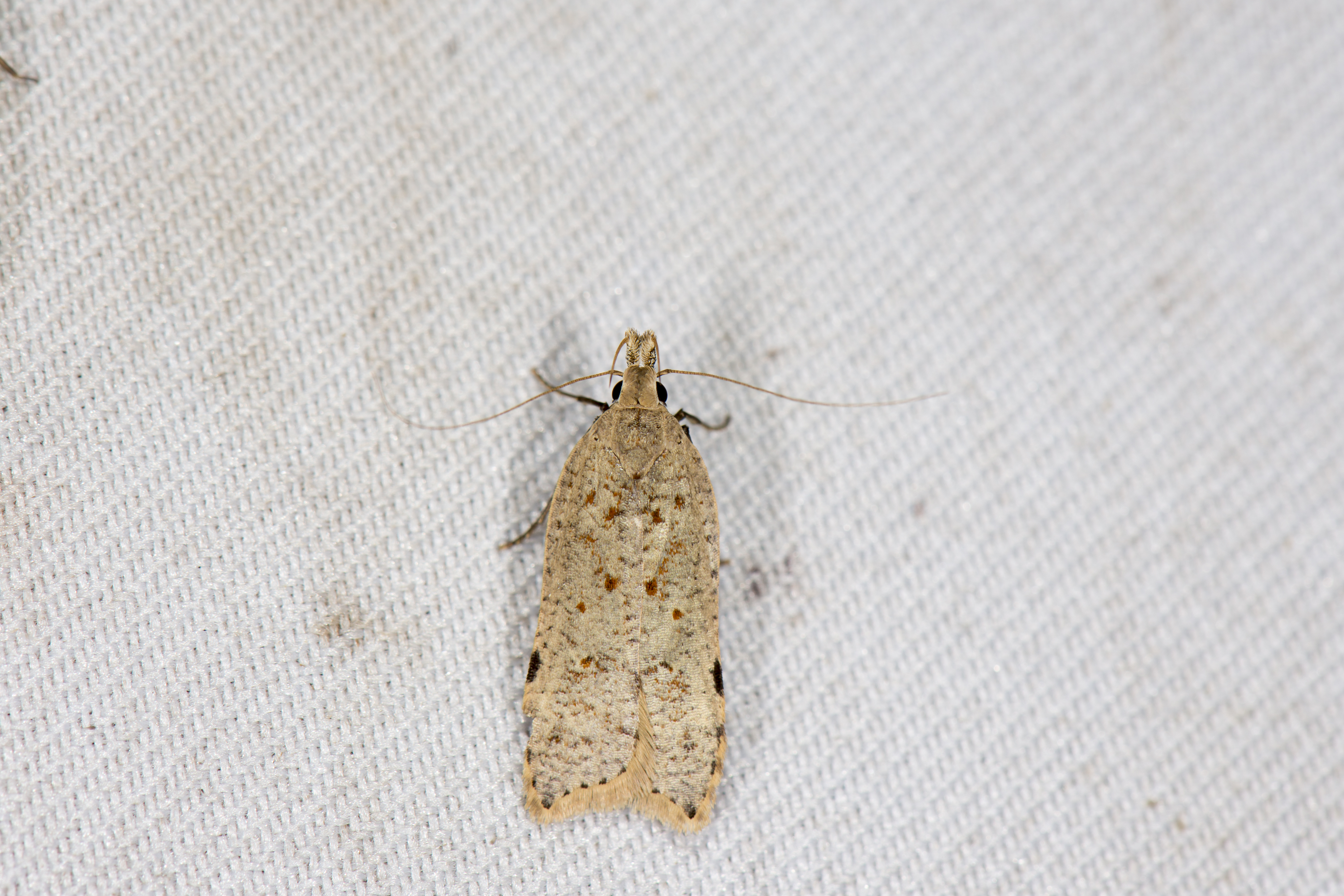
- Dichomeris Crambaleas

Scientific classification
- Kingdom: Animalia
- Phylum: Arthropoda
- Class: Insecta
- Order: Lepidoptera
- Family: Gelechiidae
- Genus: Dichomeris
- Species: D. crambaleas

Binomial name
- Dichomeris crambaleas (Meyrick, 1913)

Synonyms
- Trichotaphe crambaleas Meyrick, 1913

= Dichomeris crambaleas =

Species of moth

Dichomeris crambaleas is a moth in the family Gelechiidae. It was described by Edward Meyrick in 1913. It is found in Taiwan and Assam, India.

The wingspan is 20–21 mm (0.79–0.83 in). The forewings are pale brownish ochreous sometimes strewn with strigulae of blackish irroration (sprinkles), sometimes partially suffused with ferruginous brown in the disc and towards the dorsum, and on the veins posteriorly. There is sometimes a round spot of blackish suffusion in the disc at one-third, and an oblique spot from the dorsum at one-fourth directed towards it. The stigmata are blackish or dark ferruginous brown, the discal approximated, the plical rather before the first discal. There is a small blackish mark on the costa at two-thirds and some blackish dots around the posterior part of the costa and termen. The hindwings are fuscous, darker towards the apex.
