= Gelechia trachydyta =

Scientific classification
- Kingdom: Animalia
- Phylum: Arthropoda
- Clade: Pancrustacea
- Class: Insecta
- Order: Lepidoptera
- Family: Gelechiidae
- Genus: Gelechia
- Species: G. trachydyta

Binomial name
- Gelechia trachydyta (Meyrick, 1920)

Synonyms
- Chelaria trachydyta Meyrick, 1920

Species of moth

Gelechia trachydyta is a moth of the family Gelechiidae. It was described by Edward Meyrick in 1920. It is found in southern India.

The wingspan is 12–14 mm. The forewings are fuscous, irregularly irrorated (sprinkled) with dark fuscous, with several small scattered tufts of scales and semi-oval dark fuscous spots on the costa before the middle and at two-thirds. There are undefined elongate spots of dark fuscous suffusion or irroration in the disc before and beyond the middle, and above the tornus, as well as cloudy dark marginal dots around the posterior part of the costa and termen. The hindwings are grey, thinly scaled anteriorly.
