= Dichomeris mesoglena =

Scientific classification
- Kingdom: Animalia
- Phylum: Arthropoda
- Class: Insecta
- Order: Lepidoptera
- Family: Gelechiidae
- Genus: Dichomeris
- Species: D. mesoglena

Binomial name
- Dichomeris mesoglena Meyrick, 1923

Species of moth

Dichomeris mesoglena is a moth in the family Gelechiidae. It was described by Edward Meyrick in 1923. It is found in southern India.

The wingspan is about 19 mm (0.75 in). The forewings are yellow ochreous, sprinkled with light bluish grey, tending to form irregular strigulation. The base of the costa is dark bluish fuscous, with oblique blackish costal strigulae from this to three-fourths, tipped with blue grey. There is also a small round blackish spot in the middle of the disc and a dark fuscous terminal fascia, very narrow at the apex and the tornus, the remainder triangularly dilated, the angle connected by a light blue-grey mark with the costa at four-fifths. The hindwings are dark grey.
