= Dichomeris acuminata =

Alfalfa leaf tier

Scientific classification
- Domain: Eukaryota
- Kingdom: Animalia
- Phylum: Arthropoda
- Class: Insecta
- Order: Lepidoptera
- Family: Gelechiidae
- Genus: Dichomeris
- Species: D. acuminata

Binomial name
- Dichomeris acuminata (Staudinger, in Kalchberg, 1876)

Synonyms
- Dichomeris acuminatus; Mesophleps acuminatus Staudinger, in Kalchberg, 1876; Hypsolophus ianthes Meyrick, 1887; Dichomeris ianthes; Ypsolophus rusticus Walsingham, 1892; Ypsolophus ammoxanthus Meyrick, 1904; Ypsolophus ochrophanes Meyrick, 1907; Ypsolophus lotellus Constant, 1893; Ypsolophus sublotellus Caradja, 1920

Species of moth

Dichomeris acuminata, the alfalfa leaf tier, is a moth of the family Gelechiidae. It was first described by Otto Staudinger in 1876. It is a widely distributed species, being known from India, Myanmar, and Sri Lanka southwest to the Seychelles, Mauritius and Réunion and on to Egypt, east and South Africa and southern Europe. Eastward from India it extends through Indonesia and Malaysia to Taiwan and Australia. It is also found in Japan, the West Indies, North America and Hawaii.

The wingspan is about 10 mm.
