= Dichomeris siranta =

Scientific classification
- Kingdom: Animalia
- Phylum: Arthropoda
- Class: Insecta
- Order: Lepidoptera
- Family: Gelechiidae
- Genus: Dichomeris
- Species: D. siranta

Binomial name
- Dichomeris siranta (Meyrick, 1913)

Synonyms
- Trichotaphe siranta Meyrick, 1913

Species of moth

Dichomeris siranta is a moth in the family Gelechiidae. It was described by Edward Meyrick in 1913. It is found in Assam, India.

The wingspan is 16–17 mm (0.63–0.67 in). The forewings are ochreous, sometimes tinged with fuscous and with the costal edge fuscous. The stigmata are dark fuscous, the first discal conspicuous, others little marked, the plical somewhat beyond the first discal. There is a narrow fuscous terminal fascia, widest beneath the apex and narrowed to the tornus. There is also an interrupted dark fuscous terminal line. The hindwings are dark grey.
