= Dichomeris antisticta =

Scientific classification
- Kingdom: Animalia
- Phylum: Arthropoda
- Class: Insecta
- Order: Lepidoptera
- Family: Gelechiidae
- Genus: Dichomeris
- Species: D. antisticta

Binomial name
- Dichomeris antisticta (Meyrick, 1929)

Synonyms
- Cymotricha antisticta Meyrick, 1929

Species of moth

Dichomeris antisticta is a moth of the family Gelechiidae. It was described by Edward Meyrick in 1929. It is known from southern India.

The wingspan is about 17 mm.

The larvae feed on Terminalia tomentosa.
