= Dichomeris frenigera =

Scientific classification
- Kingdom: Animalia
- Phylum: Arthropoda
- Class: Insecta
- Order: Lepidoptera
- Family: Gelechiidae
- Genus: Dichomeris
- Species: D. frenigera

Binomial name
- Dichomeris frenigera (Meyrick, 1913)

Synonyms
- Hypelictis frenigera Meyrick, 1913

Species of moth

Dichomeris frenigera is a moth in the family Gelechiidae. It was described by Edward Meyrick in 1913. It is found in Assam, India.

The wingspan is 13–14 mm (0.51–0.55 in). The forewings are dark violet fuscous, with slaty-grey reflections and a very fine whitish curved or bent line from two-thirds of the costa to the tornus. There is an ochreous-yellow or orange apical patch, with the anterior edge somewhat convex, enclosing two or three fuscous wedge-shaped spots on the termen. There is also a more or less developed fine black line around the apex and termen. The hindwings are rather dark fuscous.
