= Larcophora =

Scientific classification
- Domain: Eukaryota
- Kingdom: Animalia
- Phylum: Arthropoda
- Class: Insecta
- Order: Lepidoptera
- Family: Gelechiidae
- Subfamily: Gelechiinae
- Genus: Larcophora; Meyrick, 1925
- Species: L. sophronistis

Binomial name
- Larcophora sophronistis (Meyrick, 1918)

Synonyms
- Onebala sophronistis Meyrick, 1918

Genus of moths

Larcophora is a genus of moths in the family Gelechiidae. It contains the species Larcophora sophronistis, which is found in India.

The wingspan is about 12 mm. The forewings are rather dark fuscous with a transverse blackish fascia at one-third, narrowed towards the costa. The second discal stigma is moderate, round and black and there is a dark fuscous shade from three-fourths of the costa to the tornus, suffused anteriorly, well-defined posteriorly and somewhat angulated beneath the costa and in the disc. The hindwings are grey.
