= Dichomeris acrochlora =

Scientific classification
- Kingdom: Animalia
- Phylum: Arthropoda
- Class: Insecta
- Order: Lepidoptera
- Family: Gelechiidae
- Genus: Dichomeris
- Species: D. acrochlora

Binomial name
- Dichomeris acrochlora (Meyrick, 1905)

Synonyms
- Hypelictis acrochlora Meyrick, 1905

Species of moth

Dichomeris acrochlora is a moth of the family Gelechiidae. It was described by Edward Meyrick in 1905. It is known from Sri Lanka and India.

Its wingspan is about 18 mm. The forewings are dark shining purplish bronzy fuscous with a hardly paler obtusely angulated transverse line from four-fifths of the costa to the tornus. The apical distorted portion is pale shining with ochreous. The hindwings are fuscous, paler towards base and the subdorsal hairs are pale whitish ochreous.
