= Scrobipalpa ergasima =

Scientific classification
- Kingdom: Animalia
- Phylum: Arthropoda
- Class: Insecta
- Order: Lepidoptera
- Family: Gelechiidae
- Genus: Scrobipalpa
- Species: S. ergasima

Binomial name
- Scrobipalpa ergasima (Meyrick, [1916])

Synonyms
- Phthorimaea ergasima Meyrick, 1916; Ergasiola ergasima; Phthorimaea intestina Meyrick, 1921; Lita mignatella Caradja, 1920; Gnorimoschema mirabile Gregor & Povolný, 1955; Gnorimoschema pervada Clarke, 1962

Species of moth

Scrobipalpa ergasima is a moth of the family Gelechiidae. Edward Meyrick first used the scientific name in 1916. It is found in the Mediterranean Region and on the Canary Islands. Outside of Europe, it is found in Egypt, Saudi Arabia, the Democratic Republic of the Congo, Namibia, South Africa, Sudan, Australia, India, Indonesia, Myanmar and Pakistan.

The wingspan is about 10 mm (0.39 in).

The larvae feed on Hyoscyamus albus, Solanum melongena and Solanum nigrum. They mine the leaves of their host plant. They can be found from March to October.
