= Mnesistega talantodes =

Scientific classification
- Domain: Eukaryota
- Kingdom: Animalia
- Phylum: Arthropoda
- Class: Insecta
- Order: Lepidoptera
- Family: Gelechiidae
- Genus: Mnesistega
- Species: M. talantodes

Binomial name
- Mnesistega talantodes Meyrick, 1918

Species of moth

Mnesistega talantodes is a moth in the family Gelechiidae. It was described by Edward Meyrick in 1918. It is found in southern India.

The wingspan is 9–12 mm. The forewings are yellow ochreous with a few scattered dark fuscous scales and a dark purple-fuscous basal patch, which is widest on the costa and sends a more or less suffused costal streak to the posterior fascia. The first discal stigma is cloudy and dark fuscous and there is a slender irregular suffused dark purple-fuscous transverse fascia at three-fourths, as well as an irregular dark purple-fuscous apical spot. The hindwings are grey, more or less hyaline (glass like) between the veins anteriorly, especially in males.
