= Heliangara macaritis =

Scientific classification
- Kingdom: Animalia
- Phylum: Arthropoda
- Class: Insecta
- Order: Lepidoptera
- Family: Autostichidae
- Genus: Heliangara
- Species: H. macaritis

Binomial name
- Heliangara macaritis Meyrick, 1910

Species of moth

Heliangara macaritis is a moth in the family Autostichidae. It was described by Edward Meyrick in 1910. It is found in India (Bengal, Bombay).

The wingspan is 13–14 mm. The forewings are bright deep coppery purple and the hindwings are dark fuscous.
