= Dichomeris corniculata =

Scientific classification
- Domain: Eukaryota
- Kingdom: Animalia
- Phylum: Arthropoda
- Class: Insecta
- Order: Lepidoptera
- Family: Gelechiidae
- Genus: Dichomeris
- Species: D. corniculata

Binomial name
- Dichomeris corniculata (Meyrick, 1913)

Synonyms
- Trichotaphe corniculata Meyrick, 1913

Species of insect

Dichomeris corniculata is a moth in the family Gelechiidae. It was described by Edward Meyrick in 1913. It is found in Assam, India and Guangdong, China.

The wingspan is 21–23 mm (0.83–0.91 in). The forewings are fuscous or brownish, sometimes slightly reddish tinged and with the costal edge yellow ochreous from the base to an elongate-triangular black spot on the middle of the costa, of which the lower part is sometimes brown. There is an oblique dark fuscous or ochreous-brown spot on the fold before one-third, often nearly obsolete, the second discal stigma small, ochreous brown or dark fuscous, sometimes accompanied by a few whitish scales, the first discal sometimes also indicated. There is a pale ochreous line from the costa beyond the black spot to the dorsum before the tornus, curved inwards beneath the costa, sometimes almost obsolete, or edged anteriorly with ochreous-brown suffusion. There are some ill-defined dark fuscous dots around the posterior part of the costa and termen. The hindwings are fuscous.
