= Gelechia machinata =

Scientific classification
- Kingdom: Animalia
- Phylum: Arthropoda
- Clade: Pancrustacea
- Class: Insecta
- Order: Lepidoptera
- Family: Gelechiidae
- Genus: Gelechia
- Species: G. machinata

Binomial name
- Gelechia machinata (Meyrick, 1929)

Synonyms
- Telphusa machinata Meyrick, 1929

Species of moth

Gelechia machinata is a moth of the family Gelechiidae. It is found in India (Assam).
