= Dichomeris lupata =

Scientific classification
- Kingdom: Animalia
- Phylum: Arthropoda
- Class: Insecta
- Order: Lepidoptera
- Family: Gelechiidae
- Genus: Dichomeris
- Species: D. lupata

Binomial name
- Dichomeris lupata (Meyrick, 1913)

Synonyms
- Hypelictis lupata Meyrick, 1913

Species of moth

Dichomeris lupata is a moth in the family Gelechiidae. It was described by Edward Meyrick in 1913. It is found in Assam, India.

The wingspan is 16–18 mm (0.63–0.71 in). The forewings are glossy dark violet fuscous with an oblique ochreous-whitish strigula on the costa at three-fourths and a faint line from this to the tornus. There is an ochreous-yellow streak along the termen from the apex to near the tornus, attenuated downwards, with three acute projecting teeth anteriorly. The hindwings are dark fuscous.
