= Dichomeris dicausta =

Scientific classification
- Kingdom: Animalia
- Phylum: Arthropoda
- Class: Insecta
- Order: Lepidoptera
- Family: Gelechiidae
- Genus: Dichomeris
- Species: D. dicausta

Binomial name
- Dichomeris dicausta (Meyrick, 1913)

Synonyms
- Zomeutis dicausta Meyrick, 1913

Species of moth

Dichomeris dicausta is a moth in the family Gelechiidae. It was described by Edward Meyrick in 1913. It is found in Assam, India.

The wingspan is 19–21 mm (0.75–0.83 in). The forewings are slaty fuscous with a narrow fulvous-brown streak along the costa from the middle to near the apex, its costal edge dark fuscous. There are irregular narrow fulvous-brown streaks above and below the middle from near the base to two-fifths. The plical and second discal stigmata are represented by a few green-whitish scales, the latter preceded by a short obscure oblique longitudinal streak of fulvous brown suffusion. The hindwings are dark fuscous.
