= Dichomeris eridantis =

Scientific classification
- Kingdom: Animalia
- Phylum: Arthropoda
- Class: Insecta
- Order: Lepidoptera
- Family: Gelechiidae
- Genus: Dichomeris
- Species: D. eridantis

Binomial name
- Dichomeris eridantis (Meyrick, 1907)

Synonyms
- Ypsolophus eridantis Meyrick, 1907

Species of moth

Dichomeris eridantis is a moth in the family Gelechiidae. It was described by Edward Meyrick in 1907. It is found in India (Bengal).

The wingspan is 17–20 mm (0.67–0.79 in). The forewings are light greyish ochreous irrorated (sprinkled) with fuscous and sometimes with a few blackish scales, sometimes yellowish tinged. The costa is obliquely strigulated with blackish from the base to beyond the middle. The stigmata is formed by blackish irroration, the plical beneath the first discal, usually also with an additional dot in the disc at one-fourth and sometimes one beneath the second discal. There is a row of blackish dots along the posterior part of the costa and termen. The hindwings are grey, darker posteriorly.
