= Semnostoma leucochalca =

Scientific classification
- Domain: Eukaryota
- Kingdom: Animalia
- Phylum: Arthropoda
- Class: Insecta
- Order: Lepidoptera
- Family: Gelechiidae
- Genus: Semnostoma
- Species: S. leucochalca

Binomial name
- Semnostoma leucochalca Meyrick, 1918

Species of moth

Semnostoma leucochalca is a moth of the family Gelechiidae. It was described by Edward Meyrick in 1918. It is found in Assam, India.

The wingspan is about 14 mm. The forewings are dark fuscous, variably marked with white and brassy yellow, especially a number of irregular confluent markings occupying the dorsal area beneath the fold, and a dark blotch on the costa at one-third which is more or less outlined by irregular markings, but all very variable. There are three or four white marks posteriorly converging to a small black subapical spot edged anteriorly and above with silvery. The hindwings are light grey.
