= Dichomeris ptychosema =

Scientific classification
- Kingdom: Animalia
- Phylum: Arthropoda
- Class: Insecta
- Order: Lepidoptera
- Family: Gelechiidae
- Genus: Dichomeris
- Species: D. ptychosema

Binomial name
- Dichomeris ptychosema Meyrick, 1913

Species of moth

Dichomeris ptychosema is a moth in the family Gelechiidae. It was described by Edward Meyrick in 1913. It is found in Assam, India.

The wingspan is 14–17 mm (0.55–0.67 in). The forewings are whitish ochreous, strigulated with fuscous and dark fuscous irroration (sprinkles) and with a small dark fuscous spot on the base of the costa, a short mark in the middle, another beyond three-fourths, and several dots between these. There is also a small blackish-fuscous spot on the fold at one-fourth. The second discal stigma is moderate, dark fuscous, with the plical and first discal minute or obsolete, the plical beneath the first discal. The hindwings are iridescent grey.
