= Antiochtha leucograpta =

Scientific classification
- Kingdom: Animalia
- Phylum: Arthropoda
- Class: Insecta
- Order: Lepidoptera
- Family: Lecithoceridae
- Genus: Antiochtha
- Species: A. leucograpta

Binomial name
- Antiochtha leucograpta (Meyrick, 1923)

Synonyms
- Onebala leucograpta Meyrick, 1923

Species of moth

Antiochtha leucograpta is a moth in the family Lecithoceridae. It was described by Edward Meyrick in 1923. It is found in southern India.

The wingspan is about 15 mm. The forewings are light brownish irrorated dark fuscous and blackish. There is an irregular white streak from the costa at one-third to the dorsum before the middle, preceded by stronger blackish irroration, angulated below the middle, above the middle with a blackish white-ringed dot resting on it. The second discal stigma is transverse, of blackish irroration, ringed white. There is a rather thick irregular white streak from three-fourths of the costa to four-fifths of the dorsum, indented above the middle, stronger blackish suffusion towards the costa before and beyond this. The hindwings are grey, thinly scaled.
