= Dichomeris metatoxa =

Scientific classification
- Kingdom: Animalia
- Phylum: Arthropoda
- Class: Insecta
- Order: Lepidoptera
- Family: Gelechiidae
- Genus: Dichomeris
- Species: D. metatoxa

Binomial name
- Dichomeris metatoxa (Meyrick, 1935)

Synonyms
- Cymotricha metatoxa Meyrick, 1935

Species of moth

Dichomeris metatoxa is a moth in the family Gelechiidae. It was described by Edward Meyrick in 1935. It is found in southern India.

The larvae feed on Bauhinia vahlii.
