= Dichomeris thyrsicola =

Scientific classification
- Kingdom: Animalia
- Phylum: Arthropoda
- Class: Insecta
- Order: Lepidoptera
- Family: Gelechiidae
- Genus: Dichomeris
- Species: D. thyrsicola

Binomial name
- Dichomeris thyrsicola (Meyrick, 1913)

Synonyms
- Hypelictis thyrsicola Meyrick, 1913

Species of moth

Dichomeris thyrsicola is a moth in the family Gelechiidae. It was described by Edward Meyrick in 1913. It is found in Assam, India.

The wingspan is 16–17 mm (0.63–0.67 in). The forewings are greyish ochreous, with a few scattered black scales and with the costa suffused with dark grey except towards the apex, where it is tinged with crimson. The stigmata are indicated by small indistinct spots of grey suffusion, the discal approximated, the plical rather before the first discal. The hindwings are rather dark grey.
