= Xystophora defixa =

Scientific classification
- Kingdom: Animalia
- Phylum: Arthropoda
- Class: Insecta
- Order: Lepidoptera
- Family: Gelechiidae
- Genus: Xystophora
- Species: X. defixa

Binomial name
- Xystophora defixa (Meyrick, 1929)

Synonyms
- Aristotelia defixa Meyrick, 1929

Species of moth

Xystophora defixa is a moth of the family Gelechiidae. It was described by Edward Meyrick in 1929. It is found in southern India.

The wingspan is about 13 mm.
