= Hyperochtha justa =

Scientific classification
- Kingdom: Animalia
- Phylum: Arthropoda
- Class: Insecta
- Order: Lepidoptera
- Family: Lecithoceridae
- Genus: Hyperochtha
- Species: H. justa

Binomial name
- Hyperochtha justa (Meyrick, 1910)

Synonyms
- Onebala justa Meyrick, 1910; Onebala metriodes Meyrick, 1918; Abrachmia karachiella Amsel, 1968

Species of moth

Hyperochtha justa is a moth in the family Lecithoceridae. It was described by Edward Meyrick in 1910. It is found in Sri Lanka, India and Pakistan.

The wingspan is 11–12 mm. The forewings are grey closely irrorated (sprinkled) with dark fuscous and with small ochreous-whitish dots on the costa at four-fifths and the tornus. The hindwings are grey.
