= Crocogma =

Scientific classification
- Kingdom: Animalia
- Phylum: Arthropoda
- Class: Insecta
- Order: Lepidoptera
- Family: Lecithoceridae
- Subfamily: Lecithocerinae
- Genus: Crocogma; Meyrick, 1918
- Species: C. isocola

Binomial name
- Crocogma isocola Meyrick, 1918

Synonyms
- Demopractis Meyrick, 1918; Demopractis tonaea Meyrick, 1918

Genus of moths

Crocogma is a genus of moth in the family Lecithoceridae. It contains the species Crocogma isocola, which is found in India (Assam).

The wingspan is about 12 mm. The forewings are pale ochreous, more or less irrorated fuscous, the costa and upper part of the termen suffused rather dark fuscous. The stigmata are blackish, with the discal large, the plical smaller, rather obliquely before the first discal. The hindwings are whitish-ochreous, with a deep ochreous-yellow streak of modified scales along the submedian fold.
