= Dichomeris caerulescens =

Scientific classification
- Kingdom: Animalia
- Phylum: Arthropoda
- Class: Insecta
- Order: Lepidoptera
- Family: Gelechiidae
- Genus: Dichomeris
- Species: D. caerulescens

Binomial name
- Dichomeris caerulescens (Meyrick, 1913)

Synonyms
- Trichotaphe caerulescens Meyrick, 1913

Species of moth

Dichomeris caerulescens is a moth in the family Gelechiidae. It was described by Edward Meyrick in 1913. It is found in Assam, India.

The wingspan is 14–15 mm (0.55–0.59 in). The forewings are dark fuscous, with strong bluish-leaden reflections. The stigmata is rather large, blackish, the plical somewhat before the first discal. There is an ochreous-whitish dot on costa at two-thirds. There is a terminal series of blackish dots. The hindwings are grey.
