= Dichomeris melanortha =

Scientific classification
- Kingdom: Animalia
- Phylum: Arthropoda
- Class: Insecta
- Order: Lepidoptera
- Family: Gelechiidae
- Genus: Dichomeris
- Species: D. melanortha

Binomial name
- Dichomeris melanortha Meyrick, 1929

Species of moth

Dichomeris melanortha is a moth in the family Gelechiidae. It was described by Edward Meyrick in 1929. It is found in southern India.

The wingspan is about 12 mm (0.47 in).
