= Xystophora asthenodes =

Scientific classification
- Kingdom: Animalia
- Phylum: Arthropoda
- Class: Insecta
- Order: Lepidoptera
- Family: Gelechiidae
- Genus: Xystophora
- Species: X. asthenodes

Binomial name
- Xystophora asthenodes (Meyrick, 1923)

Synonyms
- Aristotelia asthenodes Meyrick, 1923

Species of moth

Xystophora asthenodes is a moth of the family Gelechiidae. It was described by Edward Meyrick in 1923. It is found in north-western India.

The wingspan is 13–14 mm. The forewings are pale grey closely sprinkled with pale ochreous. The stigmata are faint, cloudy, light grey, the plical rather obliquely before the first discal. Sometimes, there is a faint shadowy darker band at two-thirds. The hindwings are grey.
