= Dichomeris quercicola =

Scientific classification
- Kingdom: Animalia
- Phylum: Arthropoda
- Class: Insecta
- Order: Lepidoptera
- Family: Gelechiidae
- Genus: Dichomeris
- Species: D. quercicola

Binomial name
- Dichomeris quercicola Meyrick, 1921

Species of moth

Dichomeris quercicola is a moth in the family Gelechiidae. It was described by Edward Meyrick in 1921. It is found in northern India, Mongolia, Transbaikalia, south-eastern Siberia, China (Beijing, Shaanxi, Hunan, Jiangxi), Korea and Japan.

The wingspan is about 17 mm (0.67 in). The forewings are light yellow ochreous with a narrow grey streak on the basal fourth of the costa. The stigmata is blackish, the discal approximated, the plical somewhat before the first discal. There is an oblique interrupted grey streak crossing the disc between the plical and first discal stigmata and there is a very irregular transverse line across the second discal from an elongate spot on the costa. Some irregular grey irroration (sprinkling) and suffusion is found towards the costa and dorsum except anteriorly, and in the disc posteriorly. There is also an irregular grey streak along the termen. The hindwings are whitish grey, with the veins and apex grey.

The larvae feed on Quercus species and Lespedeza cyrtoborysa.
