= Nothris hastata =

Scientific classification
- Kingdom: Animalia
- Phylum: Arthropoda
- Class: Insecta
- Order: Lepidoptera
- Family: Gelechiidae
- Genus: Nothris
- Species: N. hastata

Binomial name
- Nothris hastata (Meyrick, 1918)

Synonyms
- Dichomeris hastata Meyrick, 1918; Harpagidia hastata Meyrick, 1918

Species of moth

Nothris hastata is a moth in the family Gelechiidae. It was described by Edward Meyrick in 1918. It is found in north-eastern India.

The wingspan is 13–20 mm. The forewings are fuscous, the veins marked by faint pale lines and with blackish marks on the base of the costa and dorsum. There is a strong black central streak from the base to the end of cell, the lower edge with a short linear tooth on the fold, the extremity prolonged as a slender acute streak to near the apex. The hindwings are grey.
