= Antiochtha foederalis =

Scientific classification
- Kingdom: Animalia
- Phylum: Arthropoda
- Class: Insecta
- Order: Lepidoptera
- Family: Lecithoceridae
- Genus: Antiochtha
- Species: A. foederalis

Binomial name
- Antiochtha foederalis (Meyrick, 1923)

Synonyms
- Onebala foederalis Meyrick, 1923

Species of moth

Antiochtha foederalis is a moth in the family Lecithoceridae. It was described by Edward Meyrick in 1923. It is found in southern India.

The wingspan is 20–21 mm. The forewings are brownish, irregularly irrorated (sprinkled) with dark fuscous. The stigmata form small irregular dark fuscous spots, sometimes partially edged with whitish, the plical obliquely beyond the first discal, these sometimes united and confluent with dark fuscous suffusion extending to the costa at one-third. There is a whitish spot on the costa at three-fourths, where a whitish line, usually nearly obsolete but sometimes distinct, sharply angulated first inwards and then outwards, runs to the tornus. There are two minute whitish dots on the costa towards the apex and sometimes scattered white scales on the apical area. The hindwings are light grey, anteriorly whitish tinged.
