= Dichomeris malachias =

Scientific classification
- Kingdom: Animalia
- Phylum: Arthropoda
- Class: Insecta
- Order: Lepidoptera
- Family: Gelechiidae
- Genus: Dichomeris
- Species: D. malachias

Binomial name
- Dichomeris malachias (Meyrick, 1913)

Synonyms
- Trichotaphe malachias Meyrick, 1913

Species of moth

Dichomeris malachias is a moth in the family Gelechiidae. It was described by Edward Meyrick in 1913. It is found in Assam, India.

The wingspan is 16–18 mm (0.63–0.71 in). The forewings are light greenish ochreous, towards the costa whitish ochreous with scattered dark fuscous scales. The costal edge is blackish towards the base and there is a dark fuscous dot in the disc at one-fourth. The stigmata is dark fuscous, the discal moderately large, whitish ringed, the plical smaller, beneath the first discal. There are also two or three small marks of dark fuscous irroration (sprinkling) on the costa posteriorly, as well as a very undefined narrow fascia of faint brownish suffusion with dark fuscous irroration from four-fifths of the costa close before the termen to the tornus and some dark fuscous terminal dots. The hindwings are grey.
