= Dichomeris melitura =

Scientific classification
- Kingdom: Animalia
- Phylum: Arthropoda
- Class: Insecta
- Order: Lepidoptera
- Family: Gelechiidae
- Genus: Dichomeris
- Species: D. melitura

Binomial name
- Dichomeris melitura (Meyrick, 1916)

Synonyms
- Trichotaphe melitura Meyrick, 1916

Species of moth

Dichomeris melitura is a moth in the family Gelechiidae. It was described by Edward Meyrick in 1916. It is found in southern India.

The wingspan is about 18 mm (0.71 in). The forewings are dark ashy grey with a faint violet tinge, sprinkled with black specks and with a short oblique black streak in the disc at one-third. The costal edge is shortly blackish beyond the middle. The hindwings are dark grey.
