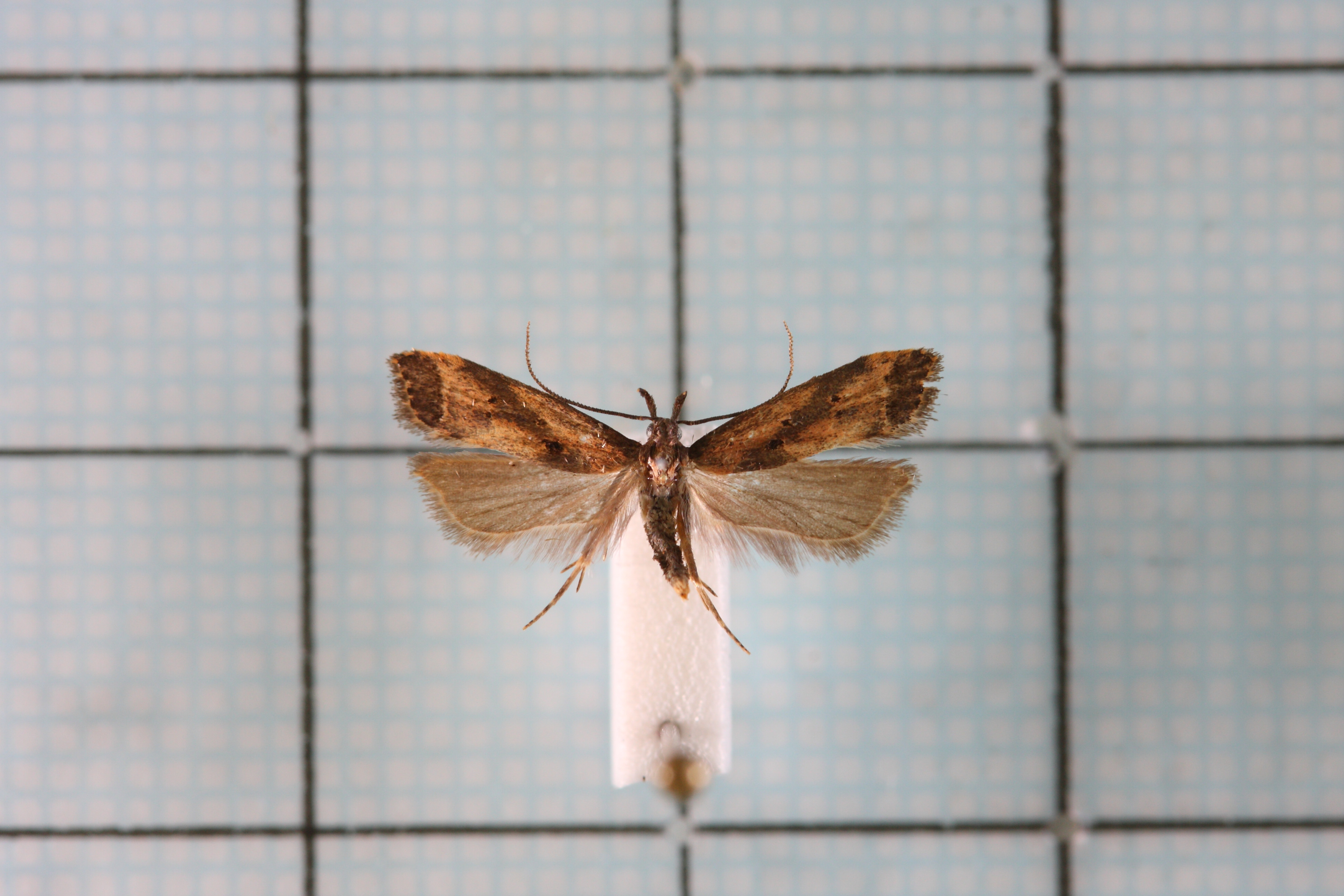

Scientific classification
- Kingdom: Animalia
- Phylum: Arthropoda
- Class: Insecta
- Order: Lepidoptera
- Family: Gelechiidae
- Genus: Helcystogramma
- Species: H. trijunctum

Binomial name
- Helcystogramma trijunctum (Meyrick, 1934)

Synonyms
- Orsodytis trijuncta Meyrick, 1934; Dichomeris trijuncta; Anathyrsotis ceriochranta Meyrick, 1939 (disputed)

= Helcystogramma trijunctum =

Species of moth

Helcystogramma trijunctum is a moth in the family Gelechiidae. It is found in China (Anhui, Gansu, Guangxi, Guizhou, Hubei, Hunan, Shaanxi, Sichuan, Yunnan) and Taiwan.

The length of the forewings is 6-6.5 mm. The forewings have a fuscous fascia from the base to halfway the length of the anterior margin. There is a large, triangular costal blotch nearly connected to the fuscous fascia arising from the posterior margin at one-fourth the length and the postmedian line is incurved, dark brown beyond it. There is also a well—developed blackish tuft beyond the cell on the fold near the middle, other smaller ones near the middle and end of the cell.
