= Helcystogramma obscuratum =

Scientific classification
- Kingdom: Animalia
- Phylum: Arthropoda
- Class: Insecta
- Order: Lepidoptera
- Family: Gelechiidae
- Genus: Helcystogramma
- Species: H. obscuratum

Binomial name
- Helcystogramma obscuratum (Meyrick, 1911)

Synonyms
- Strobisia armatata var. obscurata Meyrick, 1911; Helcystogramma obscurata (Meyrick, 1911)

Species of moth

Helcystogramma obscuratum is a moth in the family Gelechiidae. It was described by Edward Meyrick in 1911. It is found in Assam, India.

The wingspan is 11–16 mm. Adults are similar to Helcystogramma armatum, but the fulvous ground colour is duller and more or less largely mixed and suffused with dark fuscous, sometimes mostly obscured, usually forming a more or less defined dark fuscous sometimes pale edged blotch on the dorsum about the middle. There is sometimes an obscure pale oblique transverse line from the white costal spot.
