= Helcystogramma luminosa =

Scientific classification
- Kingdom: Animalia
- Phylum: Arthropoda
- Clade: Pancrustacea
- Class: Insecta
- Order: Lepidoptera
- Family: Gelechiidae
- Genus: Helcystogramma
- Species: H. luminosa

Binomial name
- Helcystogramma luminosa (Busck, 1914)

Synonyms
- Dichomeris luminosa Busck, 1914; Teuchophanes leucopleura Meyrick, 1914

Species of moth

Helcystogramma luminosa is a moth in the family Gelechiidae. It was described by August Busck in 1914. It is found in Panama and Guyana.

The wingspan is about 14 mm. The colour and markings of the forewings are nearly identical to Helcystogramma perceptella, but the blackish-brown part is even more violet iridescent and there is a light yellow inner edge of the first orange spot and a light yellow central dash in the second orange spot. This spot is more rounded and without the dorsal and apical attenuations found in H. perceptella. The hindwings, abdomen and legs are coloured like H. perceptella.
