= Helcystogramma graphicodes =

Scientific classification
- Kingdom: Animalia
- Phylum: Arthropoda
- Class: Insecta
- Order: Lepidoptera
- Family: Gelechiidae
- Genus: Helcystogramma
- Species: H. graphicodes

Binomial name
- Helcystogramma graphicodes (Meyrick, 1914)

Synonyms
- Brachmia graphicodes Meyrick, 1914

Species of moth

Helcystogramma graphicodes is a moth in the family Gelechiidae. It was described by Edward Meyrick in 1914. It is found in South Africa.

The wingspan is 13–14 mm. The forewings are fuscous, all veins marked with clear white lines. The stigmata is black, with the discal approximated and the plical obliquely before the first discal. There are some minute black dots along the termen. The hindwings are ochreous whitish.
