= Helcystogramma selectella =

Scientific classification
- Kingdom: Animalia
- Phylum: Arthropoda
- Class: Insecta
- Order: Lepidoptera
- Family: Gelechiidae
- Genus: Helcystogramma
- Species: H. selectella

Binomial name
- Helcystogramma selectella (Walker, 1864)

Synonyms
- Gelechia selectella Walker, 1864

Species of moth

Helcystogramma selectella is a moth in the family Gelechiidae. It was described by Francis Walker in 1864. It is found in Amazonas, Brazil.

Adults are dark cupreous, the forewings with two bands consisting of glittering green dots. There are also two glittering purple dots, one near the end of the costa and the other, larger one, near the exterior border.
