= Helcystogramma cerinura =

Scientific classification
- Kingdom: Animalia
- Phylum: Arthropoda
- Class: Insecta
- Order: Lepidoptera
- Family: Gelechiidae
- Genus: Helcystogramma
- Species: H. cerinura

Binomial name
- Helcystogramma cerinura (Meyrick, 1923)

Synonyms
- Brachmia cerinura Meyrick, 1923

Species of moth

Helcystogramma cerinura is a moth in the family Gelechiidae. It was described by Edward Meyrick in 1923. It is found in Pará, Brazil.

The wingspan is 12–13 mm. The forewings are rather dark fuscous with the plical and first discal stigmata represented by a rather 8-shaped brownish spot edged with some blackish scales. There is a short fine whitish line from the dorsum preceding this, and the second discal forms a roundish similar spot. There is also a small cloudy whitish spot on the costa at five-sixths, as well as some marginal white specks around the apex and termen. The hindwings are grey.
