= Helcystogramma craticula =

Scientific classification
- Kingdom: Animalia
- Phylum: Arthropoda
- Class: Insecta
- Order: Lepidoptera
- Family: Gelechiidae
- Genus: Helcystogramma
- Species: H. craticula

Binomial name
- Helcystogramma craticula (Meyrick, 1921)

Synonyms
- Brachmia craticula Meyrick, 1921; Onebala craticula Meyrick, 1921

Species of moth

Helcystogramma craticula is a moth in the family Gelechiidae. It was described by Edward Meyrick in 1921. It is found in Mozambique.

The wingspan is about 10 mm. The forewings are ochreous whitish irregularly streaked longitudinally with brown suffusion and dark fuscous sprinkles, and with a stronger blackish streak along the fold. There are short very oblique dark fuscous streaks from the costa at the base and before and beyond one-fourth. The plical stigma is represented by a segment of blackish, the plical streak cut off by white marks, the discal stigmata by a dark fuscous streak with the anterior extremity cut off by white, and posterior nearly encircled by a white ring. There is a fine whitish very oblique striga from the costa at three-fourths and some minute white dots round the posterior part of the costa and termen. The termen is blackish between these. The hindwings are light slaty grey.
