= Helcystogramma verberata =

Scientific classification
- Kingdom: Animalia
- Phylum: Arthropoda
- Class: Insecta
- Order: Lepidoptera
- Family: Gelechiidae
- Genus: Helcystogramma
- Species: H. verberata

Binomial name
- Helcystogramma verberata (Meyrick, 1911)

Synonyms
- Brachmia verberata Meyrick, 1911

Species of moth

Helcystogramma verberata is a moth in the family Gelechiidae. It was described by Edward Meyrick in 1911. It is found in the Democratic Republic of the Congo (North Kivu), Kenya and South Africa.

The wingspan is 12–13 mm. The forewings are whitish ochreous suffused with brownish and sprinkled with dark fuscous, sometimes with a few whitish scales. There is an undefined basal patch of dark fuscous suffusion, the outer edge running from two-fifths of the costa to one-fifth of the dorsum. There are three undefined fasciae of dark fuscous suffusion, the first from beyond the middle of the costa to before the middle of the dorsum, the second at four-fifths, parallel to the termen, the third terminal. The stigmata are small, blackish, with the plical slightly before the first discal. The hindwings are grey.
