= Helcystogramma flavistictum =

Scientific classification
- Domain: Eukaryota
- Kingdom: Animalia
- Phylum: Arthropoda
- Class: Insecta
- Order: Lepidoptera
- Family: Gelechiidae
- Genus: Helcystogramma
- Species: H. flavistictum

Binomial name
- Helcystogramma flavistictum H.-H. Li & Zhen, 2011

Species of moth

Helcystogramma flavistictum is a moth in the family Gelechiidae. It was described by Hou-Hun Li and Hui Zhen in 2011. It is found in the Chinese provinces of Gansu, Henan and Shaanxi.

The wingspan is 13–14.5 mm.
