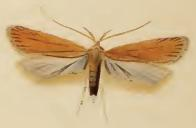
- Helcystogramma rufescens

Scientific classification
- Domain: Eukaryota
- Kingdom: Animalia
- Phylum: Arthropoda
- Class: Insecta
- Order: Lepidoptera
- Family: Gelechiidae
- Subfamily: Dichomeridinae
- Genus: Helcystogramma; Zeller, 1877

Type species
- Gelechia obseratella Zeller, 1877

Synonyms
- Ceratophora Heinemann, 1870; Teuchophanes Meyrick, 1914; Schemataspis Meyrick, 1918; Parelectra Meyrick, in Wytsman, 1925; Psamathoscopa Meyrick, 1937; Anathyrsotis Meyrick, 1939; Parelectroides Clarke, 1952

= Helcystogramma =

Genus of moths

Helcystogramma is a genus of moths in the family Gelechiidae. The genus was erected by Philipp Christoph Zeller in 1877.

== Distribution and diversity ==
The genus is distributed almost worldwide, with around half of known taxa occurring in Asia. In 1997 there were about 93 valid species, and more have since been described.

== Species ==
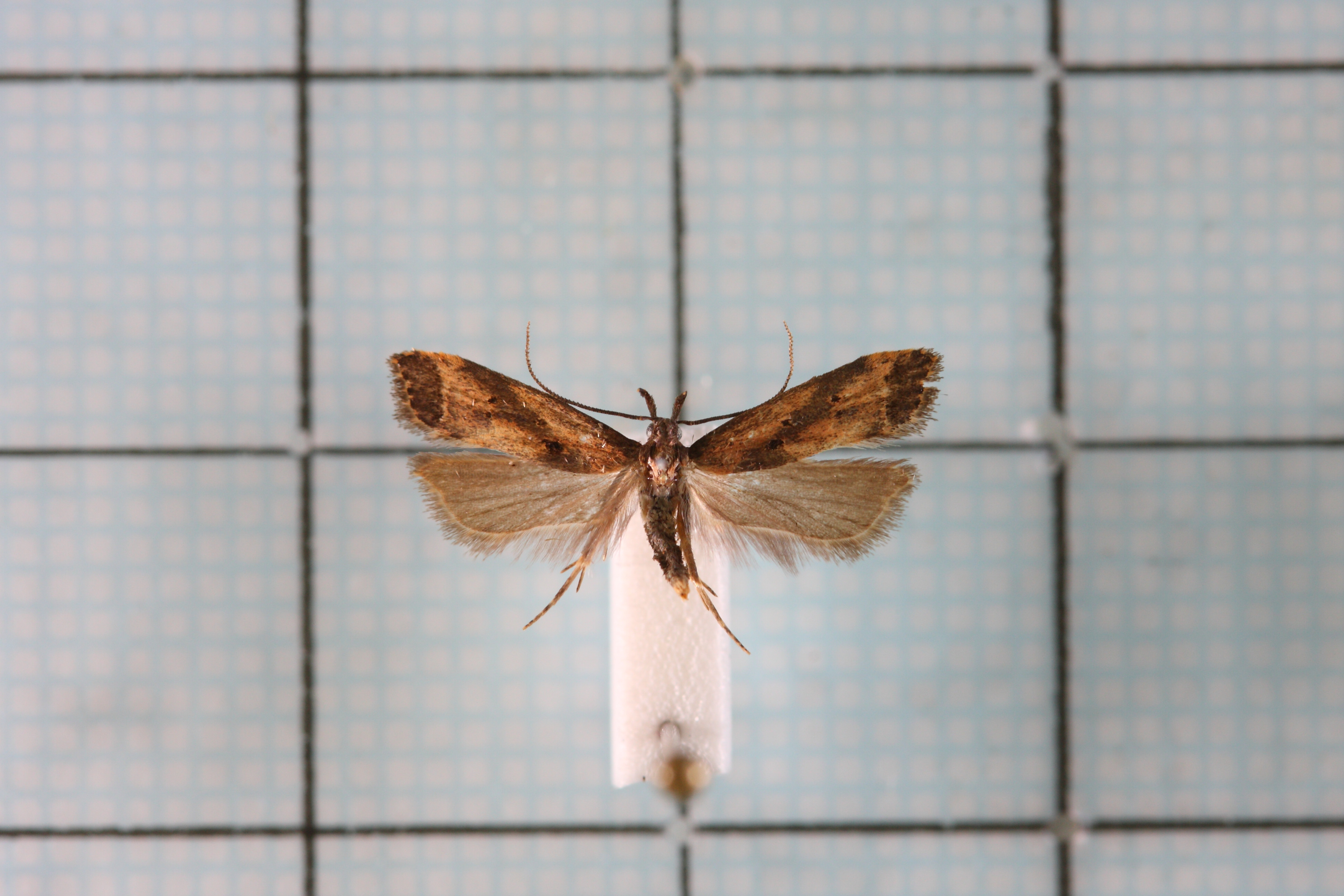
Helcystogramma trijunctum

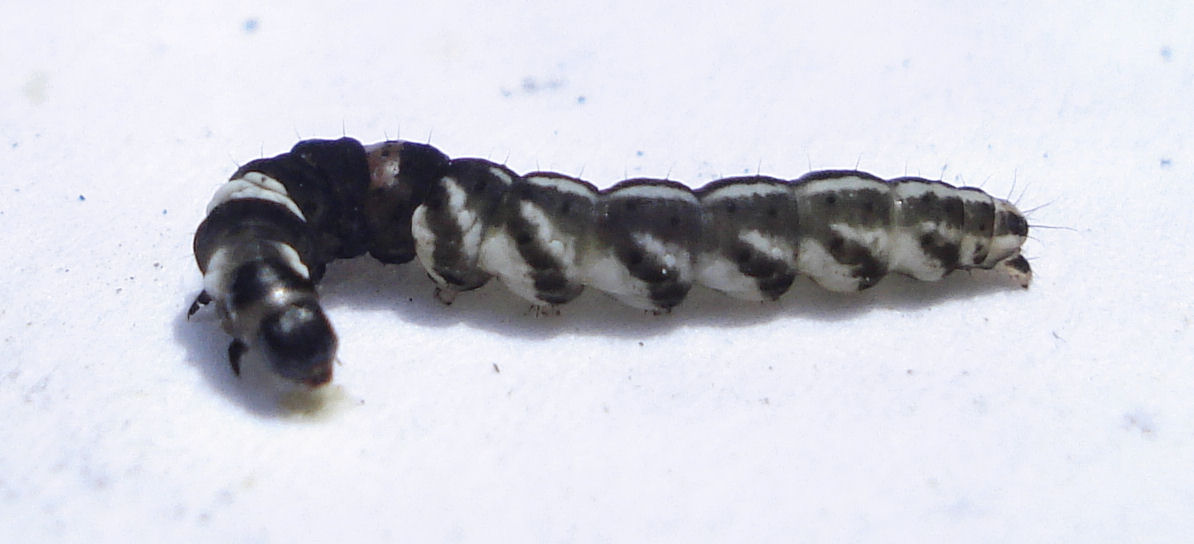
Helcystogramma rufescens larva

- Helcystogramma abortiva (Walsingham, 1911)
- Helcystogramma adaequata Meyrick, 1914
- Helcystogramma albilepidotum Li & Zhen, 2011
- Helcystogramma albinervis (Gerasimov, 1929)
- Helcystogramma amethystium (Meyrick, 1906)
- Helcystogramma angustum Li & Zhen, 2011
- Helcystogramma anthistis (Meyrick, 1929)
- Helcystogramma archigrapha (Meyrick, 1929)
- Helcystogramma armatum (Meyrick, 1911)
- Helcystogramma arotraeum (Meyrick, 1894)
- Helcystogramma arulensis (Rebel, 1929)
- Helcystogramma aruritis (Meyrick, 1911)
- Helcystogramma augusta (Meyrick, 1911)
- Helcystogramma badia (Braun, 1921)
- Helcystogramma balteatum (Meyrick, 1911)
- Helcystogramma bicuneum (Meyrick, 1911)
- Helcystogramma brabylitis (Meyrick, 1911)
- Helcystogramma brevinodium Li & Zhen, 2011
- Helcystogramma carycastis Meyrick, 1922
- Helcystogramma casca (Braun, 1925)
- Helcystogramma cerinura (Meyrick, 1923)
- Helcystogramma chalybea (Felder & Rogenhofer, 1875)
- Helcystogramma chalyburga Meyrick, 1922
- Helcystogramma chambersella (Murtfeldt, 1874)
- Helcystogramma claripunctella Ponomarenko, 1998
- Helcystogramma clarkei Rose and Pathania, 2003
- Helcystogramma compositaepictum (N. Omelko & M. Omelko, 1993)
- Helcystogramma conturbata (Meyrick, 1933)
- Helcystogramma convolvuli (Walsingham, 1908) – sweet potato leafroller
- Helcystogramma cornuta (Busck, 1914)
- Helcystogramma craticula (Meyrick, 1921)
- Helcystogramma cricopa (Meyrick, 1911)
- Helcystogramma crypsinomum (Meyrick, 1929)
- Helcystogramma cyanozona (Meyrick, 1923)
- Helcystogramma daedalea (Walsingham, 1911)
- Helcystogramma delocosma (Meyrick, 1936)
- Helcystogramma deltophora (Janse, 1954)
- Helcystogramma ectopon Hodges, 1986
- Helcystogramma engraptum (Meyrick, 1918)
- Helcystogramma epicentra (Meyrick, 1911)
- Helcystogramma fernaldella (Busck, 1903)
- Helcystogramma fiscinata (Meyrick, 1918)
- Helcystogramma flavescens Junnilainen, 2010
- Helcystogramma flavifuscum Li & Zhen, 2011
- Helcystogramma flavilineolella Ponomarenko, 1998
- Helcystogramma flavistictum Li & Zhen, 2011
- Helcystogramma furvimaculare Li & Zhen, 2011
- Helcystogramma fuscomarginatum Ueda, 1995
- Helcystogramma gradatum (Meyrick, 1910)
- Helcystogramma graphicodes (Meyrick, 1914)
- Helcystogramma gypsaspis Meyrick, 1921
- Helcystogramma hapalyntis (Meyrick, 1911)
- Helcystogramma hassenzanensis Park & Hodges, 1995
- Helcystogramma helicopis (Meyrick, 1922)
- Helcystogramma hemiopa (Meyrick, 1921)
- Helcystogramma heterostigma (Diakonoff, 1967)
- Helcystogramma heterotoma (Diakonoff, 1967)
- Helcystogramma hibisci (Stainton, 1859)
- Helcystogramma hoplophorum Meyrick, 1916
- Helcystogramma hystricella (Braun, 1921)
- Helcystogramma idiastis (Meyrick, 1916)
- Helcystogramma imagibicuneum Li & Zhen, 2011
- Helcystogramma imagitrijunctum Li & Zhen, 2011
- Helcystogramma immeritellum (Walker, 1864)
- Helcystogramma ineruditum (Meyrick, 1926)
- Helcystogramma infibulatum Meyrick, 1916
- Helcystogramma juventellus (Walsingham, 1897)
- Helcystogramma klimeschi Ponomarenko & Huemer, 2001
- Helcystogramma leucoplectum (Meyrick, 1911)
- Helcystogramma lineolella (Zeller, 1839)
- Helcystogramma lithostrotum Meyrick, 1916
- Helcystogramma lochistis (Meyrick, 1911)
- Helcystogramma luminosa (Busck, 1914)
- Helcystogramma lutatella (Herrich-Schäffer, 1854)
- Helcystogramma lyrella (Walsingham, 1911)
- Helcystogramma malacogramma (Meyrick, 1909)
- Helcystogramma meconitis (Meyrick, 1913)
- Helcystogramma melanocarpa (Meyrick, 1929)
- Helcystogramma melantherella (Busck, 1900)
- Helcystogramma melissia (Walsingham, 1911)
- Helcystogramma microsema (Meyrick, 1911)
- Helcystogramma musicopa (Meyrick, 1908)
- Helcystogramma nesidias (Meyrick, 1911)
- Helcystogramma neurograpta (Meyrick, 1921)
- Helcystogramma obscuratum (Meyrick, 1911)
- Helcystogramma octophora (Meyrick, 1918)
- Helcystogramma pantheropa (Meyrick, 1913)
- Helcystogramma perceptella (Busck, 1914)
- Helcystogramma perelegans (N. Omelko & M. Omelko, 1993)
- Helcystogramma philomusum (Meyrick, 1918)
- Helcystogramma phryganitis (Meyrick, 1911)
- Helcystogramma rectangulum Li & Zhen, 2011
- Helcystogramma rhabduchum (Meyrick, 1911)
- Helcystogramma ribbeella (Zeller, 1877)
- Helcystogramma rufescens (Haworth, 1828)
- Helcystogramma rusticella (Walker, 1864)
- Helcystogramma scintillula (Walsingham, 1911)
- Helcystogramma selectella (Walker, 1864)
- Helcystogramma septella (Zeller, 1852)
- Helcystogramma sertigera Meyrick, 1923
- Helcystogramma simplex (Walsingham, 1900)
- Helcystogramma spilopis (Meyrick, 1927)
- Helcystogramma stellatella (Busck, 1914)
- Helcystogramma subvectella (Walker, 1864)
- Helcystogramma symbolica Meyrick, 1914
- Helcystogramma tegulella (Walsingham, 1897)
- Helcystogramma thesmiopa (Meyrick, 1922)
- Helcystogramma thiostoma (Meyrick, 1929)
- Helcystogramma triannulella (Herrich-Schäffer, 1854)
- Helcystogramma trichocyma (Meyrick, 1923)
- Helcystogramma trigonella (Walsingham, 1892)
- Helcystogramma trijunctum (Meyrick, 1934)
- Helcystogramma tristellum (Snellen, 1901)
- Helcystogramma uedai Rose and Pathania, 2003
- Helcystogramma verberata (Meyrick, 1911)
- Helcystogramma victrix (Meyrick, 1911)
- Helcystogramma virescens (Walsingham, 1911)
- Helcystogramma xerastis (Meyrick, 1905)

== Former species ==
- Helcystogramma ceriochrantum (Meyrick, 1939)
- Helcystogramma obseratella (Zeller, 1877)
