= Helcystogramma angustum =

Scientific classification
- Domain: Eukaryota
- Kingdom: Animalia
- Phylum: Arthropoda
- Class: Insecta
- Order: Lepidoptera
- Family: Gelechiidae
- Genus: Helcystogramma
- Species: H. angustum

Binomial name
- Helcystogramma angustum H.-H. Li & Zhen, 2011

Species of moth

Helcystogramma angustum is a moth in the family Gelechiidae. It was described by Hou-Hun Li and Hui Zhen in 2011. It is found in the Chinese provinces of Guizhou and Hubei.

The wingspan is 11.5–15 mm.
