= Helcystogramma malacogramma =

Scientific classification
- Kingdom: Animalia
- Phylum: Arthropoda
- Class: Insecta
- Order: Lepidoptera
- Family: Gelechiidae
- Genus: Helcystogramma
- Species: H. malacogramma

Binomial name
- Helcystogramma malacogramma (Meyrick, 1909)

Synonyms
- Brachmia malacogramma Meyrick, 1909

Species of moth

Helcystogramma malacogramma is a moth in the family Gelechiidae. It was described by Edward Meyrick in 1909. It is found in Zimbabwe and Gauteng, South Africa.

The wingspan is about 14 mm. The forewings are whitish yellowish with a rather broad brownish median stripe from the base to the apex, darker brown towards the apex, including traces of a pale line on the internal vein, and a more distinct one on vein six. There are undefined narrow brownish streaks between the veins towards the costa and posteriorly. The stigmata is blackish, with the first discal minute, indistinctly whitish ringed, the second discal whitish edged posteriorly, and with the plical larger, obliquely before the first discal. There is a suffused brownish spot beneath the second discal, touching the median stripe. The hindwings are pale whitish grey tinged with ochreous.
