= Helcystogramma claripunctella =

Scientific classification
- Kingdom: Animalia
- Phylum: Arthropoda
- Class: Insecta
- Order: Lepidoptera
- Family: Gelechiidae
- Genus: Helcystogramma
- Species: H. claripunctella

Binomial name
- Helcystogramma claripunctella Ponomarenko, 1998

Species of moth

Helcystogramma claripunctella is a moth in the family Gelechiidae. It was described by Ponomarenko in 1998. It is found in the Russian Far East (Primorsky Krai, Kuril Islands).

The wingspan is 14–15 mm.
