= Helcystogramma daedalea =

Scientific classification
- Domain: Eukaryota
- Kingdom: Animalia
- Phylum: Arthropoda
- Class: Insecta
- Order: Lepidoptera
- Family: Gelechiidae
- Genus: Helcystogramma
- Species: H. daedalea

Binomial name
- Helcystogramma daedalea (Walsingham, 1911)

Synonyms
- Dichomeris daedalea Walsingham, 1911

Species of moth

Helcystogramma daedalea is a moth in the family Gelechiidae. It was described by Thomas de Grey, 6th Baron Walsingham, in 1911. It is found in Mexico (Tabasco).

The wingspan is about 14 mm. There is a short shining grey basal patch on the forewings, ill-defined externally where it is margined by a dark brown shade, extending to nearly half the wing-length and containing a shining lilac-grey patch on the dorsum. There is a slender shining steel-blue line on the costa, and beneath it two bright yellowish ochreous streaks, between which is a second submetallic line and two blackish length-streaks, one along the upper edge of the fold, the other, shorter, beneath the costa at one-third, followed by some pale whitish ochreous scaling. A broad central band, ill-defined on its inner side, consists of a shining steel-grey patch throwing up a projection to the upper angle of the cell, widely margined towards the costa and narrowly along its outer edge by tawny black. Beyond this band the remaining portion of the wing is rich tawny chestnut, with a small whitish ochreous triangular patch on the costa, adjacent to the dark band. The hindwings are brownish fuscous.
