= Helcystogramma casca =

Scientific classification
- Domain: Eukaryota
- Kingdom: Animalia
- Phylum: Arthropoda
- Class: Insecta
- Order: Lepidoptera
- Family: Gelechiidae
- Genus: Helcystogramma
- Species: H. casca

Binomial name
- Helcystogramma casca (Braun, 1925)

Synonyms
- Brachmia casca Braun, 1925

Species of moth

Helcystogramma casca is a moth in the family Gelechiidae. It was described by Annette Frances Braun in 1925. It is found in North America, where it has been recorded from southern Saskatchewan and British Columbia to Utah, Colorado and Oregon.
