= Helcystogramma flavilineolella =

Scientific classification
- Kingdom: Animalia
- Phylum: Arthropoda
- Class: Insecta
- Order: Lepidoptera
- Family: Gelechiidae
- Genus: Helcystogramma
- Species: H. flavilineolella

Binomial name
- Helcystogramma flavilineolella Ponomarenko, 1998

Species of moth

Helcystogramma flavilineolella is a moth in the family Gelechiidae. It was described by Ponomarenko in 1998. It is found in south-eastern Siberia and China (Henan, Liaoning, Shaanxi, Sichuan, Zhejiang).

The wingspan is 13–16 mm.
