= Helcystogramma idiastis =

Scientific classification
- Kingdom: Animalia
- Phylum: Arthropoda
- Class: Insecta
- Order: Lepidoptera
- Family: Gelechiidae
- Genus: Helcystogramma
- Species: H. idiastis

Binomial name
- Helcystogramma idiastis (Meyrick, 1916)

Synonyms
- Brachmia idiastis Meyrick, 1916

Species of moth

Helcystogramma idiastis is a moth in the family Gelechiidae. It was described by Edward Meyrick in 1916. It is known from north-eastern India.

The wingspan is 10–11 mm. The forewings are grey, finely irrorated (sprinkled) with ochreous whitish. The stigmata is moderate, dark fuscous, laterally edged with white, with the plical beneath the first discal. There is a terminal row of dark fuscous dots. The hindwings are light grey.

The larvae feed on Panicum species.
