= Helcystogramma immeritellum =

Scientific classification
- Kingdom: Animalia
- Phylum: Arthropoda
- Class: Insecta
- Order: Lepidoptera
- Family: Gelechiidae
- Genus: Helcystogramma
- Species: H. immeritellum

Binomial name
- Helcystogramma immeritellum (Walker, 1864)

Synonyms
- Gelechia immeritella Walker, 1864; Strobisia immeritella Meyrick, 1911; Schemataspis immeritella Meyrick, 1925

Species of moth

Helcystogramma immeritellum is a moth in the family Gelechiidae. It was described by Francis Walker in 1864. It is known from Java in Indonesia and from Sri Lanka.

Adults are fawn coloured, the forewings with five whitish oblique elongated costal spots, the first before the middle, the second beyond and the rest near the tip. The hindwings are paler.
