= Helcystogramma ectopon =

Scientific classification
- Kingdom: Animalia
- Phylum: Arthropoda
- Clade: Pancrustacea
- Class: Insecta
- Order: Lepidoptera
- Family: Gelechiidae
- Genus: Helcystogramma
- Species: H. ectopon

Binomial name
- Helcystogramma ectopon Hodges, 1986

Species of moth

Helcystogramma ectopon is a moth in the family Gelechiidae. It was described by Ronald W. Hodges in 1986. It is found in North America, where it has been recorded from Nebraska and Mississippi.
