= Helcystogramma gradatum =

Scientific classification
- Kingdom: Animalia
- Phylum: Arthropoda
- Class: Insecta
- Order: Lepidoptera
- Family: Gelechiidae
- Genus: Helcystogramma
- Species: H. gradatum

Binomial name
- Helcystogramma gradatum (Meyrick, 1910)

Synonyms
- Brachmia gradata Meyrick, 1910; Schemataspis gradata Meyrick, 1918

Species of moth

Helcystogramma gradatum is a moth in the family Gelechiidae. It was described by Edward Meyrick in 1910. It is known from north-eastern India.

The wingspan is 9–10 mm. The forewings are dark fuscous with a whitish streak above the middle from one-fifth to three-fifths, surmounted by an ochreous-yellowish streak extending to beyond it. There are three oblique white streaks from the anterior half of the costa, the first two running into the yellowish streak, the third to beyond its apex. There is also a white oblique striga from the costa close beyond this and an ochreous-yellow line from the apex of the discal streak very obliquely inwards to the fold, as well as an undefined irregular streak or line of pale ochreous suffusion beneath the fold and an oval whitish ring beneath the middle of the disc, and a patch of whitish irroration (sprinkles) beyond this. There are three short white strigulae from the costa posteriorly and the terminal area is ochreous yellowish, cut by a straight transverse leaden-metallic line rising from the last costal strigula. Adjoining this line is a small well-marked black spot anteriorly towards the dorsum, and another in the middle posteriorly reaching the termen beneath the apex. The hindwings are grey.
