= Helcystogramma melissia =

Scientific classification
- Domain: Eukaryota
- Kingdom: Animalia
- Phylum: Arthropoda
- Class: Insecta
- Order: Lepidoptera
- Family: Gelechiidae
- Genus: Helcystogramma
- Species: H. melissia

Binomial name
- Helcystogramma melissia (Walsingham, 1911)

Synonyms
- Dichomeris melissia Walsingham, 1911

Species of moth

Helcystogramma melissia is a moth in the family Gelechiidae. It was described by Thomas de Grey, 6th Baron Walsingham, in 1911. It is found in Panama, Puerto Rico and Cuba.

The wingspan is 11–12.5 mm. The forewings are bronzy fuscous, a rust-brown hive-shaped upright patch, a little before the middle of the dorsum, reaches to the upper edge of the cell and is rounded and slightly inverted at its apex. The brown colour fades upwardly about its apex and around its margins to pale ochreous and there is a small brownish ochreous spot beyond it at the end of the cell. A dull whitish ochreous spot lies at the commencement of the costal cilia, and a few pale dots along the termen. The hindwings are pale greyish fuscous.
