= Helcystogramma furvimaculare =

Scientific classification
- Domain: Eukaryota
- Kingdom: Animalia
- Phylum: Arthropoda
- Class: Insecta
- Order: Lepidoptera
- Family: Gelechiidae
- Genus: Helcystogramma
- Species: H. furvimaculare

Binomial name
- Helcystogramma furvimaculare H.-H. Li & Zhen, 2011

Species of moth

Helcystogramma furvimaculare is a moth in the family Gelechiidae. It was described by Hou-Hun Li and Hui Zhen in 2011. It is found in Guizhou, China.

The wingspan is about 16 mm.
