= Helcystogramma scintillula =

Scientific classification
- Domain: Eukaryota
- Kingdom: Animalia
- Phylum: Arthropoda
- Class: Insecta
- Order: Lepidoptera
- Family: Gelechiidae
- Genus: Helcystogramma
- Species: H. scintillula

Binomial name
- Helcystogramma scintillula (Walsingham, 1911)

Synonyms
- Strobisia scintillula Walsingham, 1911

Species of moth

Helcystogramma scintillula is a moth in the family Gelechiidae. It was described by Thomas de Grey, 6th Baron Walsingham, in 1911. It is found in Mexico (Tabasco).

The wingspan is about 10 mm. The forewings are dark brown, with a bright steel-blue spot at the base of the costa, a slender, outwardly curved steel-blue line at one-fifth from the base, two short white costal streaks, one before and one beyond the middle, beneath which are three steel-blue spots, two on the cell and one beneath the fold, and a wide steel-blue band before the termen projecting inwards above the middle. Along the margin beyond this an ochreous band runs to the apex, separated from the whitish apical cilia by a dark line. The cilia on the lower half of the termen is dark greyish fuscous and the basal patch within the first blue line, and the central fascia indicated by the white costal streaks, are very slightly paler than the ground-colour. The hindwings are brown.
