= Helcystogramma fiscinata =

Scientific classification
- Kingdom: Animalia
- Phylum: Arthropoda
- Class: Insecta
- Order: Lepidoptera
- Family: Gelechiidae
- Genus: Helcystogramma
- Species: H. fiscinata

Binomial name
- Helcystogramma fiscinata (Meyrick, 1918)

Synonyms
- Brachmia fiscinata Meyrick, 1918

Species of moth

Helcystogramma fiscinata is a moth in the family Gelechiidae. It was described by Edward Meyrick in 1918. It is found in South Africa.

The wingspan is about 10 mm. The forewings are ochreous whitish, marked between the veins with brown lines irrorated (sprinkled) with dark fuscous, less marked and incomplete on the costal two-fifths, strong on the rest of the wing, especially two terminating beneath the apex in a suffused terminal spot. There are very oblique suffused dark fuscous lines from the costa at one-fifth, two-fifths and four-fifths, crossing the costal two-fifths. The stigmata is small, dark fuscous and slightly edged with whitish, with the plical somewhat before the first discal. The hindwings are grey.
