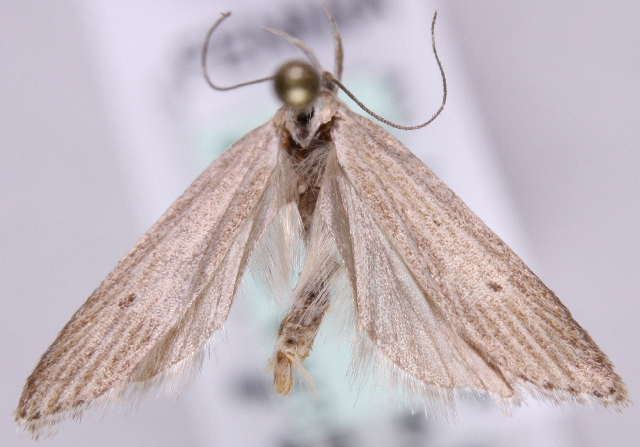

Scientific classification
- Kingdom: Animalia
- Phylum: Arthropoda
- Clade: Pancrustacea
- Class: Insecta
- Order: Lepidoptera
- Family: Gelechiidae
- Genus: Helcystogramma
- Species: H. lineolella

Binomial name
- Helcystogramma lineolella (Zeller, 1839)

Synonyms
- Gelechia lineolella Zeller, 1839

= Helcystogramma lineolella =

Species of moth

Helcystogramma lineolella is a moth of the family Gelechiidae. It was described by Philipp Christoph Zeller in 1839. It is found in most of Europe, except Ireland, Great Britain, the Benelux, the Iberian Peninsula, Italy and the Balkan Peninsula.

The wingspan is 19–20 mm. Adults are on wing from May to July.

The larvae feed on Calamagrostis epigejos and Calamagrostis arundinacea.
