= Helcystogramma philomusum =

Scientific classification
- Kingdom: Animalia
- Phylum: Arthropoda
- Class: Insecta
- Order: Lepidoptera
- Family: Gelechiidae
- Genus: Helcystogramma
- Species: H. philomusum

Binomial name
- Helcystogramma philomusum (Meyrick, 1918)

Synonyms
- Brachmia philomusa Meyrick, 1918; Onebala philomusa Meyrick, 1918; Helcystogramma philomusa (Meyrick, 1918)

Species of moth

Helcystogramma philomusum is a moth in the family Gelechiidae. It was described by Edward Meyrick in 1918. It is found in Sri Lanka and north-eastern India.

The wingspan is about 9 mm. The forewings are whitish ochreous, the cell suffused with light fuscous and the plical stigma forming an ochreous spot irrorated (sprinkled) with black, preceded and followed by some black irroration on the fold. There is a streak of black irroration from before the middle of the disc to beneath the apex, interrupted on end of cell by a roundish whitish-ochreous blotch enclosing a fuscous-ochreous spot, and three fine interneural lines of black irroration between the cell and termen beneath this. There are also a few scattered black scales in a line from before the middle of the costa to the upper angle of the cell and the apex and termen are suffused with light fuscous. The hindwings are pale grey.
