= Helcystogramma perelegans =

Scientific classification
- Domain: Eukaryota
- Kingdom: Animalia
- Phylum: Arthropoda
- Class: Insecta
- Order: Lepidoptera
- Family: Gelechiidae
- Genus: Helcystogramma
- Species: H. perelegans

Binomial name
- Helcystogramma perelegans (N. Omelko & M. Omelko, 1993)

Synonyms
- Tricyanaula perelegans N. Omelko & M. Omelko, 1993

Species of moth

Helcystogramma perelegans is a moth in the family Gelechiidae. It was described by Natalia Viktorovna Omelko and Mikhail Mikhailovich Omelko in 1993. It is found in south-eastern Siberia, Korea, Japan and China (Hunan, Tianjin).

The wingspan is 10–11.5 mm.
