= Helcystogramma ineruditum =

Scientific classification
- Kingdom: Animalia
- Phylum: Arthropoda
- Class: Insecta
- Order: Lepidoptera
- Family: Gelechiidae
- Genus: Helcystogramma
- Species: H. ineruditum

Binomial name
- Helcystogramma ineruditum (Meyrick, 1926)

Synonyms
- Brachmia inerudita Meyrick, 1926; Helcystogramma inerudita

Species of moth

Helcystogramma ineruditum is a moth in the family Gelechiidae. It was described by Edward Meyrick in 1926. It is found in Russia (Khabarovskii Krai).

The wingspan is about 14 mm. The forewings are light brownish, suffusedly irrorated (sprinkled) with rather dark fuscous and with the veins suffusedly darker lined. The extreme costal edge is ochreous whitish from one-fourth to three-fourths and the stigmata is moderate, cloudy, dark fuscous, with the plical beneath the first discal. There are indistinct small dark fuscous marginal dots around the posterior part of the costa and termen. The hindwings are light grey, suffused with whitish anteriorly.
