= Helcystogramma gypsaspis =

Scientific classification
- Domain: Eukaryota
- Kingdom: Animalia
- Phylum: Arthropoda
- Class: Insecta
- Order: Lepidoptera
- Family: Gelechiidae
- Genus: Helcystogramma
- Species: H. gypsaspis

Binomial name
- Helcystogramma gypsaspis Meyrick, 1921

Species of moth

Helcystogramma gypsaspis is a moth in the family Gelechiidae. It was described by Edward Meyrick in 1921. It is found on Java in Indonesia.

The wingspan is 8–10 mm. The forewings are dark fuscous with a pale blue-metallic oblique fasciate streak from the costa near the base, nearly meeting the apex of an erect mark from the dorsum at one-third, with beyond them a pale blue-metallic rather oblique transverse linear mark in the disc and rather short oblique wedge-shaped pale blue-metallic streaks from the costa before and beyond the middle, silvery white on the costal edge. There is a pale blue-metallic spot in the disc beyond the middle, connected with the dorsum by some irregular strigulation. A quadrate ochreous-white spot occupies the tornal angle, edged anteriorly by a bluish-silvery streak and the apical area above this is bronzy, with a bluish-silvery dot near the apex of the preceding streak, and a pale blue-metallic spot on the costa towards the apex. There is sometimes a white mark along the apical part of the costa, as well as a fine black marginal line around the apex and termen. The hindwings are dark fuscous, lighter and thinly scaled in the disc.
