= Helcystogramma thiostoma =

Scientific classification
- Kingdom: Animalia
- Phylum: Arthropoda
- Class: Insecta
- Order: Lepidoptera
- Family: Gelechiidae
- Genus: Helcystogramma
- Species: H. thiostoma

Binomial name
- Helcystogramma thiostoma (Meyrick, 1929)

Synonyms
- Onebala thiostoma Meyrick, 1929

Species of moth

Helcystogramma thiostoma is a moth in the family Gelechiidae. It was described by Edward Meyrick in 1929. It is found in southern India.

The wingspan is about 18 mm.
