= Helcystogramma klimeschi =

Scientific classification
- Kingdom: Animalia
- Phylum: Arthropoda
- Clade: Pancrustacea
- Class: Insecta
- Order: Lepidoptera
- Family: Gelechiidae
- Genus: Helcystogramma
- Species: H. klimeschi

Binomial name
- Helcystogramma klimeschi Ponomarenko & Huemer, 2001

Species of moth

Helcystogramma klimeschi is a moth in the family Gelechiidae. It was described by Ponomarenko and Huemer in 2001. It is found in Italy.
