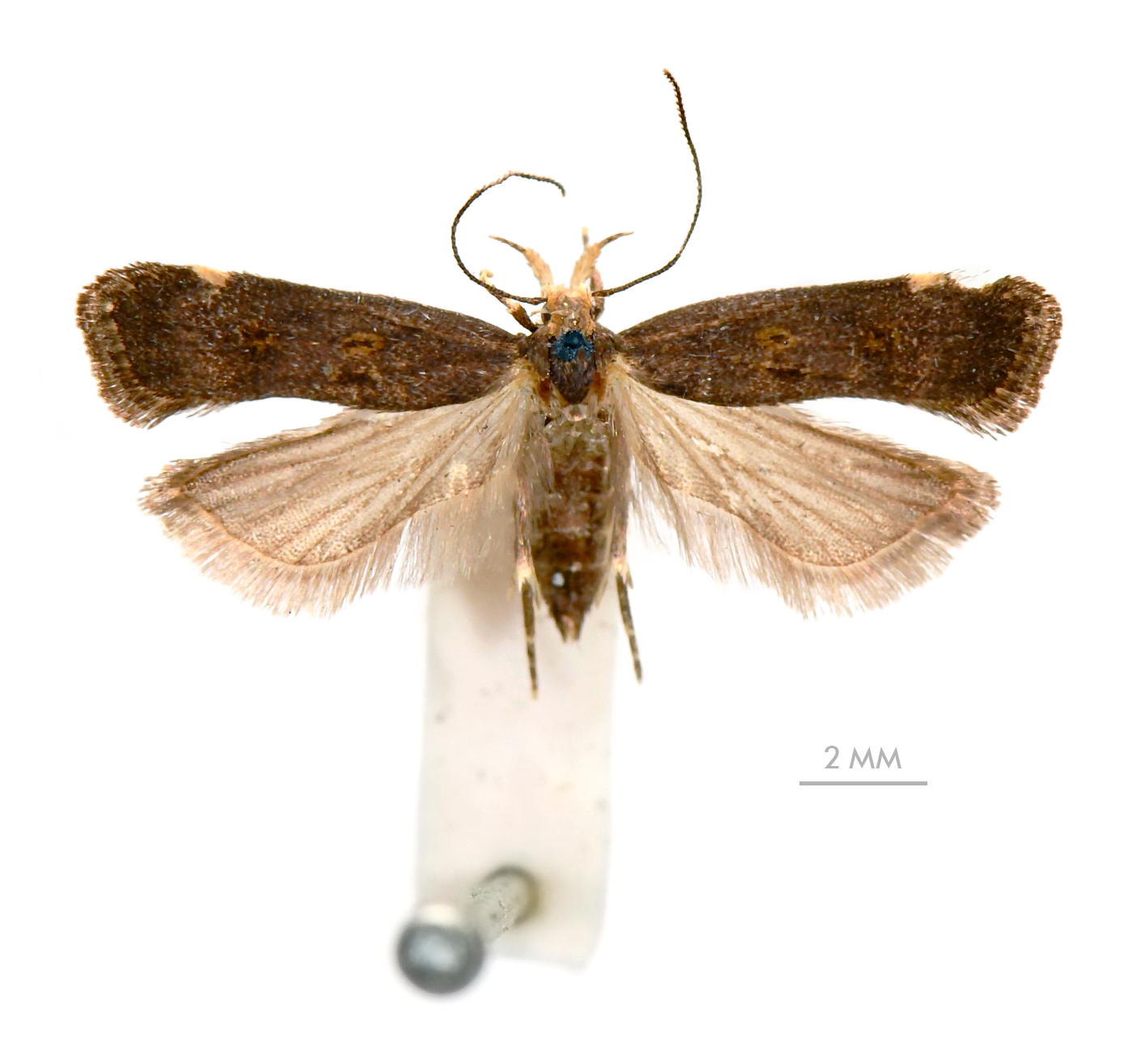
- Holotype

Scientific classification
- Domain: Eukaryota
- Kingdom: Animalia
- Phylum: Arthropoda
- Class: Insecta
- Order: Lepidoptera
- Family: Gelechiidae
- Genus: Helcystogramma
- Species: H. convolvuli

Binomial name
- Helcystogramma convolvuli (Walsingham, 1908)

Synonyms
- Trichotaphe convolvuli Walsingham, 1908; Brachmia convolvuli; Lecithocera convolvuli; Lecithocera emigrans Meyrick, 1921; Brachmia crypsilychna Meyrick, 1914; Lecithocera effera Meyrick, 1918; Brachmia dryadopa Meyrick, 1918

= Helcystogramma convolvuli =

Species of moth

Helcystogramma convolvuli, the sweet potato moth, sweetpotato webworm moth, sweetpotato leaf roller or black leaf folder, is a moth of the family Gelechiidae. It is mainly found in Asia and Africa, but there are also records from Oceania, the Middle East, the Caribbean and Florida in the United States. The species is also found on the Canary Islands and Madeira.

The wingspan is 13–15 mm. The forewings are dark tawny fuscous. The hindwings are brownish grey.

The larvae feed on Convolvulaceae species, including Ipomoea batatas, Convolvulus arvensis, Merremia quinquefolia, Ipomoea aquatica, Ipomoea cairica and Ipomoea alba.
