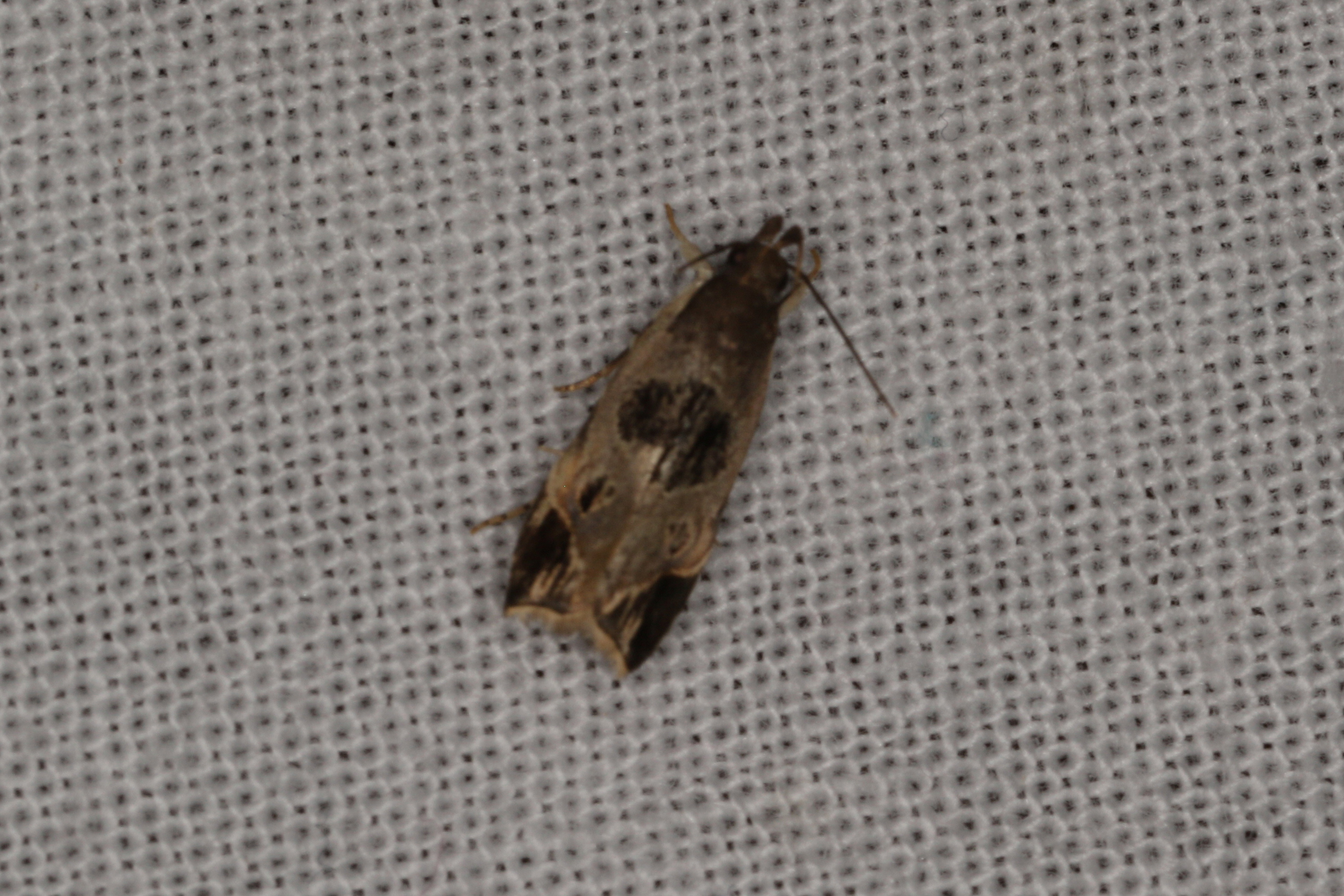

Scientific classification
- Kingdom: Animalia
- Phylum: Arthropoda
- Clade: Pancrustacea
- Class: Insecta
- Order: Lepidoptera
- Family: Gelechiidae
- Genus: Helcystogramma
- Species: H. hibisci

Binomial name
- Helcystogramma hibisci (Stainton, 1859)

Synonyms
- Gelechia hibisci Stainton, 1859; Onebala hibisci Meyrick, 1925; Gelechia obseratella Zeller, 1877; Croesophora eudela Turner, 1919

= Helcystogramma hibisci =

Species of insect

Helcystogramma hibisci is a moth in the family Gelechiidae. It was described by Stainton in 1859. It is known from China (Anhui, Guizhou, Hong Kong, Hubei, Xizang, Zhejiang), Taiwan, India, Thailand, Vietnam, Sri Lanka, Indonesia (Sumatra, Java) and Australia, where it has been recorded from the Northern Territory and Queensland.

The wingspan is about 15 mm. The forewings are pale brown with a dark brown pattern.

The larvae feed on Hibiscus (including Hibiscus heterophyllus) and Abelmoschus species.
