= Helcystogramma amethystium =

Scientific classification
- Kingdom: Animalia
- Phylum: Arthropoda
- Class: Insecta
- Order: Lepidoptera
- Family: Gelechiidae
- Genus: Helcystogramma
- Species: H. amethystium

Binomial name
- Helcystogramma amethystium (Meyrick, 1906)

Synonyms
- Zalithia amethystias Meyrick, 1906; Strobisia amethystias Meyrick, 1911; Tricyanaula amethystias Meyrick, 1925

Species of moth

Helcystogramma amethystium is a moth in the family Gelechiidae. It was described by Edward Meyrick in 1906. It is known from India and Sri Lanka.

The wingspan is about 10 mm. The forewings are dull ochreous orange sprinkled with fuscous. The markings are prismatic violet blue, partially edged with dark fuscous. There are narrow costal and median streaks from the base to one-third, an oblique mark from the costa before the middle, not reaching halfway across the wing and a short longitudinal mark beneath the disc before the middle. There is also a straight narrow fascia at two-thirds, interrupted above the middle. The apical fourth is blackish, except for a terminal line, with the anterior edge straight, near and parallel to preceding the fascia, including a small round violet-silvery-metallic spot on the costa and four others before the termen. The hindwings are dark fuscous, bronzy tinged.
