= Helcystogramma septella =

Scientific classification
- Kingdom: Animalia
- Phylum: Arthropoda
- Clade: Pancrustacea
- Class: Insecta
- Order: Lepidoptera
- Family: Gelechiidae
- Genus: Helcystogramma
- Species: H. septella

Binomial name
- Helcystogramma septella (Zeller, 1852)

Synonyms
- Gelechia (Nothris) septella Zeller, 1852; Brachmia septella; Onebala digitata Meyrick, 1914

Species of moth

Helcystogramma septella is a moth in the family Gelechiidae. It was described by Philipp Christoph Zeller in 1852. It is found in Malawi, South Africa, Tanzania and the Gambia.

The wingspan is about 15 mm (0.59 in). The forewings are fuscous suffused with whitish ochreous and with a whitish-ochreous streak from the costa near the base to beneath the costa before the middle, margined beneath with dark fuscous suffusion towards the base. There is a blackish blotch edged with ochreous whitish extending along the dorsum from near the base to beyond the middle, with the angles rounded, the upper edge sinuate and the posterior portion more prominent and reaching more than halfway across the wing. There is also a whitish-ochreous oblique streak from the costa before the middle, edged with dark fuscous posteriorly, nearly reaching the second discal stigma, which is blackish, edged with ochreous whitish. There is a whitish-ochreous line from three-fourths of the costa to the dorsum before the tornus, somewhat obtusely bent in the middle, followed on the costa by a triangular spot suffusedly marked with dark fuscous reaching one-third of the way across the wing. A triangular suffused whitish-ochreous patch occupies the apex and most of the termen. The hindwings are rather dark grey.
