= Helcystogramma augusta =

Scientific classification
- Kingdom: Animalia
- Phylum: Arthropoda
- Class: Insecta
- Order: Lepidoptera
- Family: Gelechiidae
- Genus: Helcystogramma
- Species: H. augusta

Binomial name
- Helcystogramma augusta (Meyrick, 1911)

Synonyms
- Strobisia augusta Meyrick, 1911; Tricyanaula augusta Meyrick, 1925

Species of moth

Helcystogramma augusta is a moth in the family Gelechiidae. It was described by Edward Meyrick in 1911. It is known from north-eastern India.

The wingspan is about 13 mm. The forewings are dark fuscous, anteriorly tinged and somewhat streaked towards the base with orange ochreous. The markings are pale violet blue metallic, dark edged and the costal and median streaks from the base to one-third. There is an oblique irregular streak from beyond the apex of the costal streak to the disc beyond the middle, followed by an oblique fulvous streak from the costa. There is also a spot above the dorsum before the middle and an oblique striga towards the dorsum beyond the middle, as well as a straight fascia before three-fourths, interrupted above the middle, followed by a transverse somewhat lighter fuscous line. The terminal area beyond this is tinged with fulvous and obscurely streaked longitudinally with blackish fuscous, the streaks terminated in irregular pale violet-blue-metallic spots before the margin. The hindwings are blackish-fuscous, somewhat lighter anteriorly.
