= Helcystogramma imagitrijunctum =

Scientific classification
- Kingdom: Animalia
- Phylum: Arthropoda
- Clade: Pancrustacea
- Class: Insecta
- Order: Lepidoptera
- Family: Gelechiidae
- Genus: Helcystogramma
- Species: H. imagitrijunctum

Binomial name
- Helcystogramma imagitrijunctum H.-H. Li & Zhen, 2011

Species of moth

Helcystogramma imagitrijunctum is a moth in the family Gelechiidae. It was described by Hou-Hun Li and Hui Zhen in 2011. It is found in Taiwan and the Chinese provinces of Guizhou, Jiangxi and Zhejiang.

The wingspan is 11–14 mm.
