= Helcystogramma xerastis =

Scientific classification
- Kingdom: Animalia
- Phylum: Arthropoda
- Class: Insecta
- Order: Lepidoptera
- Family: Gelechiidae
- Genus: Helcystogramma
- Species: H. xerastis

Binomial name
- Helcystogramma xerastis (Meyrick, 1905)

Synonyms
- Torodora xerastis Meyrick, 1905; Onebala xerastis Meyrick, 1905

Species of moth

Helcystogramma xerastis is a moth in the family Gelechiidae. It was described by Edward Meyrick in 1905. It is found in Pakistan.

The wingspan is 15–16 mm. The forewings are brownish ochreous, ferruginous tinged sometimes suffused with rather dark fuscous on the dorsal half anteriorly and on the veins posteriorly. The stigmata is ferruginous ochreous with some dark fuscous scales, partially edged with whitish, the plical elongate, dash like, rather before the first discal. There is a terminal series of fuscous or dark fuscous dots. The hindwings are pellucid (translucent), grey whitish, posteriorly and on the veins suffused with greyish ochreous.
