= Helcystogramma octophora =

Scientific classification
- Kingdom: Animalia
- Phylum: Arthropoda
- Class: Insecta
- Order: Lepidoptera
- Family: Gelechiidae
- Genus: Helcystogramma
- Species: H. octophora

Binomial name
- Helcystogramma octophora (Meyrick, 1918)

Synonyms
- Brachmia octophora Meyrick, 1918; Zalithia octophora

Species of moth

Helcystogramma octophora is a moth in the family Gelechiidae. It was described by Edward Meyrick in 1918. It is found in South Africa.

The wingspan is 11–12 mm. The forewings are shining leaden grey with an irregular outwards-oblique orange fascia from the base of the dorsum, not reaching the costa. There is a deep bronzy blackish-edged transverse blotch from the dorsum somewhat before the middle, broadest on the dorsum, reaching three-fourths of the way across the wing, the apex rounded and margined by a crescentic orange streak. There is also an 8-shaped orange patch filled up with fuscous, entirely crossing the wing beyond the middle from the costa to the dorsum, edged with blackish. There is also a rather curved orange line from four-fifths of the costa to just before the tornus, strongly indented in the middle, edged anteriorly with irregular black scales and posteriorly with blackish suffusion. There is also a black basal line, which is light grey beneath tornus. The hindwings are grey.
