= Helcystogramma lochistis =

Scientific classification
- Kingdom: Animalia
- Phylum: Arthropoda
- Class: Insecta
- Order: Lepidoptera
- Family: Gelechiidae
- Genus: Helcystogramma
- Species: H. lochistis

Binomial name
- Helcystogramma lochistis (Meyrick, 1911)

Synonyms
- Brachmia lochistis Meyrick, 1911

Species of moth

Helcystogramma lochistis is a moth in the family Gelechiidae. It was described by Edward Meyrick in 1911. Its range includes India and Sri Lanka.

The wingspan is 12–13 mm (0.47–0.51 in). The forewings are rather dark fuscous, faintly purple tinged. The stigmata is cloudy, blackish, with the plical beneath the first discal, larger, suffused, preceded by some white scales. There is a pale whitish-ochreous spot on the costa at three-fourths, and a terminal series of indistinct dark fuscous dots. The hindwings are grey.
