= Helcystogramma uedai =

Scientific classification
- Domain: Eukaryota
- Kingdom: Animalia
- Phylum: Arthropoda
- Class: Insecta
- Order: Lepidoptera
- Family: Gelechiidae
- Genus: Helcystogramma
- Species: H. uedai

Binomial name
- Helcystogramma uedai Rose and Pathania, 2003

Species of moth

Helcystogramma uedai is a moth in the family Gelechiidae. It was described by Rose and Pathania in 2003. It is endemic to India.
