= Helcystogramma symbolica =

Scientific classification
- Kingdom: Animalia
- Phylum: Arthropoda
- Class: Insecta
- Order: Lepidoptera
- Family: Gelechiidae
- Genus: Helcystogramma
- Species: H. symbolica

Binomial name
- Helcystogramma symbolica Meyrick, 1914

Species of moth

Helcystogramma symbolica is a moth in the family Gelechiidae. It was described by Edward Meyrick in 1914. It is found in Guyana.

The wingspan is 12–14 mm. The forewings are violet leaden grey, somewhat sprinkled with ochreous whitish and with a fine irregular dark fuscous streak above the middle from the base to near one-third, terminated with ochreous whitish. There is an irregularly rounded subtriangular blackish-whitish edged blotch extending on the dorsum from one-third to three-fifths and reaching halfway across the wing. There is also an ochreous-whitish line from the costa at one-third to the disc beyond the middle, edged posteriorly with dark fuscous suffusion, and terminated by a crescentic group of three blackish dots edged with whitish, the median largest. An ochreous-whitish line runs from two-thirds of the costa to the tornus, slightly bent in the middle and waved on the lower half, edged anteriorly with dark fuscous. The area beyond this is dark fuscous, including a thick curved submarginal leaden-grey shade, and marked on the costa with two or three ochreous-whitish dots, and on the termen with an ochreous-whitish pre-marginal line. The hindwings are dark fuscous.
