= Helcystogramma flavifuscum =

Scientific classification
- Kingdom: Animalia
- Phylum: Arthropoda
- Clade: Pancrustacea
- Class: Insecta
- Order: Lepidoptera
- Family: Gelechiidae
- Genus: Helcystogramma
- Species: H. flavifuscum

Binomial name
- Helcystogramma flavifuscum H.-H. Li & Zhen, 2011

Species of moth

Helcystogramma flavifuscum is a moth in the family Gelechiidae. It was described by Hou-Hun Li and Hui Zhen in 2011. It is found in Guangxi, China.

The wingspan is about 10.5 mm.
