= Helcystogramma flavescens =

Scientific classification
- Kingdom: Animalia
- Phylum: Arthropoda
- Clade: Pancrustacea
- Class: Insecta
- Order: Lepidoptera
- Family: Gelechiidae
- Genus: Helcystogramma
- Species: H. flavescens

Binomial name
- Helcystogramma flavescens Junnilainen, 2010

Species of moth

Helcystogramma flavescens is a moth of the family Gelechiidae. It is found in Russia (the southern Ural). The habitat consists of grassy steppes.

The wingspan is 18–19 mm. Adults are on wing in early June.
