= Helcystogramma deltophora =

Scientific classification
- Domain: Eukaryota
- Kingdom: Animalia
- Phylum: Arthropoda
- Class: Insecta
- Order: Lepidoptera
- Family: Gelechiidae
- Genus: Helcystogramma
- Species: H. deltophora

Binomial name
- Helcystogramma deltophora (Janse, 1954)

Synonyms
- Zalithia deltophora Janse, 1954

Species of moth

Helcystogramma deltophora is a moth in the family Gelechiidae. It was described by Anthonie Johannes Theodorus Janse in 1954. It is found in Namibia.
