= Helcystogramma heterotoma =

Scientific classification
- Kingdom: Animalia
- Phylum: Arthropoda
- Clade: Pancrustacea
- Class: Insecta
- Order: Lepidoptera
- Family: Gelechiidae
- Genus: Helcystogramma
- Species: H. heterotoma

Binomial name
- Helcystogramma heterotoma (Diakonoff, 1967)

Synonyms
- Brachmia heterotoma Diakonoff, 1967

Species of moth

Helcystogramma heterotoma is a moth in the family Gelechiidae. It was described by Alexey Diakonoff in 1967. It is known from the Philippines (Luzon).

The wingspan is about 11 mm. The forewings are black, partially dark grey and the dorsum with a rather broad, very pale ferruginous-white streak from the base to the tornus, slightly attenuated towards the extremities and with a small white tooth on the upper edge along the fold. There is a rather broad and straight, oblique white transverse fascia with parallel and well-defined edges. The lower third of this fascia is extended as a horizontal band posteriorly. About the apical sixth of the wing is white, containing a suffused grey-black rounded blotch, filling out the apex and connected with the ground color in the disc below the middle of the wing. The hindwings are light greyish fuscous.
