= Helcystogramma carycastis =

Scientific classification
- Domain: Eukaryota
- Kingdom: Animalia
- Phylum: Arthropoda
- Class: Insecta
- Order: Lepidoptera
- Family: Gelechiidae
- Genus: Helcystogramma
- Species: H. carycastis

Binomial name
- Helcystogramma carycastis Meyrick, 1922

Species of moth

Helcystogramma carycastis is a moth in the family Gelechiidae. It was described by Edward Meyrick in 1922. It is found in Guyana and Amazonas, Brazil.

The wingspan is 10–12 mm. The forewings are ferruginous or red brown with a white streak along the fold from the base to near the middle of the wing and with a streak of dark fuscous suffusion along the dorsum throughout. There are two light metallic-grey fasciae edged with blackish, the first from the middle of the costa, at first very broad and extended as a slender whitish streak to the base, rapidly narrowed to the dorsal suffusion at two-thirds, finely white edged anteriorly except towards the costa, and more strongly posteriorly expanding into a triangular white costal spot, the second at four-fifths, narrow, constricted in the middle, irregularly white edged, forming a white spot beneath the costa posteriorly. The costal edge towards the apex is white and there is a light metallic-grey triangular spot on the termen below the middle, and a slight mark at the apex. The hindwings are dark grey.
