= Helcystogramma balteatum =

Scientific classification
- Kingdom: Animalia
- Phylum: Arthropoda
- Class: Insecta
- Order: Lepidoptera
- Family: Gelechiidae
- Genus: Helcystogramma
- Species: H. balteatum

Binomial name
- Helcystogramma balteatum (Meyrick, 1911)

Synonyms
- Strobisia balteata Meyrick, 1911; Onebala balteata Meyrick, 1925

Species of moth

Helcystogramma balteatum is a moth in the family Gelechiidae. It was described by Edward Meyrick in 1911. It is known from north-eastern India.

The wingspan is 13–14 mm. The forewings are dark shining purplish leaden grey with a blackish-fuscous trapezoidal blotch on the dorsum before the middle, reaching two-thirds of the way across the wing, edged with whitish ochreous. There is an oblique whitish-ochreous strigula from the costa before the middle, edged posteriorly with dark fuscous. A second discal stigma is small, transverse linear and whitish ochreous and there is a nearly straight double whitish-ochreous streak from about three-fourths of the costa to the dorsum before the tornus, somewhat dilated on the costa, followed by a fascia of blackish-fuscous suffusion. There is also a whitish-ochreous streak round the apex and termen to near the tornus, thickened at the apex, edged with a blackish marginal line. The hindwings are blackish fuscous.
