= Helcystogramma trichocyma =

Scientific classification
- Kingdom: Animalia
- Phylum: Arthropoda
- Class: Insecta
- Order: Lepidoptera
- Family: Gelechiidae
- Genus: Helcystogramma
- Species: H. trichocyma

Binomial name
- Helcystogramma trichocyma (Meyrick, 1923)

Synonyms
- Brachmia trichocyma Meyrick, 1923

Species of moth

Helcystogramma trichocyma is a moth in the family Gelechiidae. It was described by Edward Meyrick in 1923. It is found in Guyana and Amazonas, Brazil.

The wingspan is about 15 mm. The forewings are rather dark fuscous with the plical and first discal stigmata represented by an indistinct somewhat 8-shaped brownish spot edged with some blackish scales and then anteriorly by a fine white waved line extended to the dorsum, the second discal minute, blackish, followed by a white dot, and beneath it a more or less developed oblique white strigula about the fold. There is also a small whitish spot on the costa at four-fifths, where a faint series of white scales crosses the wing. Indistinct small dark marginal dots are found around the apex and termen, sometimes separated by small white marks. The hindwings are dark grey.
