= Helcystogramma abortiva =

Scientific classification
- Kingdom: Animalia
- Phylum: Arthropoda
- Class: Insecta
- Order: Lepidoptera
- Family: Gelechiidae
- Genus: Helcystogramma
- Species: H. abortiva

Binomial name
- Helcystogramma abortiva (Walsingham, 1911)

Synonyms
- Dichomeris abortiva Walsingham, 1911

Species of moth

Helcystogramma abortiva is a moth in the family Gelechiidae. It was described by Thomas de Grey, 6th Baron Walsingham, in 1911. It is found in Guatemala.

The wingspan is about 14.5 mm. The forewings are brownish fuscous, faintly speckled with pale ochreous and with an outwardly angulate, narrow, pale ochreous line from the commencement of the costal to the beginning of the dorsal cilia. This is followed by a series of pale ochreous marginal spots around the apex and termen, each preceded by a short dark shade. There is an obscure whitish scale-spot on the cell, a little before the middle of the wing, followed by a pair of blackish spots surrounded by some whitish scales at the end of the cell, these are in the same line, and not one above the other. There is another whitish spot in the middle of the fold, followed by a short streak of blackish scales. The hindwings are greyish fuscous.
