= Helcystogramma bicuneum =

Scientific classification
- Kingdom: Animalia
- Phylum: Arthropoda
- Class: Insecta
- Order: Lepidoptera
- Family: Gelechiidae
- Genus: Helcystogramma
- Species: H. bicuneum

Binomial name
- Helcystogramma bicuneum (Meyrick, 1911)

Synonyms
- Strobisia bicunea Meyrick, 1911; Schemataspis bicunea Meyrick, 1925

Species of moth

Helcystogramma bicuneum is a moth in the family Gelechiidae. It was described by Edward Meyrick in 1911. It is known from north-eastern India and China (Anhui, Guizhou, Hainan, Hong Kong, Hubei, Hunan, Tibet, Yunnan).

The wingspan is 9–10 mm. The forewings are blackish fuscous with a somewhat arched yellow-ochreous subcostal streak from the base to the disc beyond the middle, edged beneath by a shorter leaden-grey streak not reaching either extremity. There are two oblique white streaks from the costa anteriorly running into the subcostal streak. There is an incurved yellow-ochreous line from one-third of the dorsum to before the apex of the leaden-grey streak, and a fine white S-shaped line from beyond the middle of dorsum to its apex, as well as an oblique leaden-grey line from the middle of the costa to beyond the apex of the subcostal streak, nearly obsolete at the origin, continued as a fine white S-shaped line parallel to the preceding one to the dorsum, between these parallel lines is a yellow-ochreous dot. There is also an oblique white striga from the costa beyond the middle, becoming yellow ochreous beneath, and two short direct white strigulae from the costa posteriorly. A straight leaden-metallic streak runs from the costa beyond these to the tornus, margined anteriorly below the middle by two wedge-shaped black marks surrounded with yellow-ochreous suffusion, and posteriorly above the middle by a small black spot reaching the termen. The remainder of the terminal area is yellow ochreous. The hindwings are grey whitish or whitish grey in males, darker posteriorly. The hindwings of the females are rather dark grey.
