= Helcystogramma archigrapha =

Scientific classification
- Kingdom: Animalia
- Phylum: Arthropoda
- Class: Insecta
- Order: Lepidoptera
- Family: Gelechiidae
- Genus: Helcystogramma
- Species: H. archigrapha

Binomial name
- Helcystogramma archigrapha (Meyrick, 1929)

Synonyms
- Onebala archigrapha Meyrick, 1929

Species of moth

Helcystogramma archigrapha is a moth in the family Gelechiidae. It was described by Edward Meyrick in 1929. It is found in Colombia.
