= Helcystogramma epicentra =

Scientific classification
- Kingdom: Animalia
- Phylum: Arthropoda
- Class: Insecta
- Order: Lepidoptera
- Family: Gelechiidae
- Genus: Helcystogramma
- Species: H. epicentra

Binomial name
- Helcystogramma epicentra (Meyrick, 1911)

Synonyms
- Strobisia epicentra Meyrick, 1911; Schemataspis epicentra Meyrick, 1925

Species of moth

Helcystogramma epicentra is a moth in the family Gelechiidae. It was described by Edward Meyrick in 1911. It is known from Sri Lanka and China (Fujian, Hong Kong, Hunan, Zhejiang).

The wingspan is 7–10 mm. The forewings are blackish fuscous with a fine white line immediately beneath the costal edge from the base almost to the middle and an irregular yellow-ochreous patch on the basal portion of the dorsum, sending a very oblique streak to the extremity of this line, receiving a yellow-ochreous line from the base above the middle, and continued to the upper extremity of a strongly inwards-oblique very elongate-oval yellow-ochreous ring in the disc beyond the middle, this latter portion edged beneath by a white streak. There are two oblique slightly curved yellow-ochreous streaks from the dorsum before the middle to the lower margin of this white streak, united at the tips by a bar, second followed by more or less white suffusion. There is also a yellow-ochreous streak from a white mark on costa at three-fourths to the dorsum before the tornus, obtusely angulated in the disc, separated on the upper half from the preceding markings by a white streak, and on the lower portion by more or less white suffusion, and followed by a slightly curved leaden-metallic streak running from three short whitish strigulae on the costa to the tornus. The terminal space beyond this is yellow ochreous, cut by three black bars, of which the median is thickest and the upper linear. The hindwings are grey or dark grey.
