= Helcystogramma cricopa =

Scientific classification
- Kingdom: Animalia
- Phylum: Arthropoda
- Class: Insecta
- Order: Lepidoptera
- Family: Gelechiidae
- Genus: Helcystogramma
- Species: H. cricopa

Binomial name
- Helcystogramma cricopa (Meyrick, 1911)

Synonyms
- Brachmia cricopa Meyrick, 1911

Species of moth

Helcystogramma cricopa is a moth in the family Gelechiidae. It was described by Edward Meyrick in 1911. It is found on the Seychelles, where it has been recorded from Mahé and Silhouette.

The wingspan is about 13 mm. The forewings are purplish fuscous with the discal stigmata represented by a few blackish scales surrounded by pale ochreous rings, the second larger, the plical reduced to a pale ochreous dot, slightly before the first discal. The hindwings are light grey.
