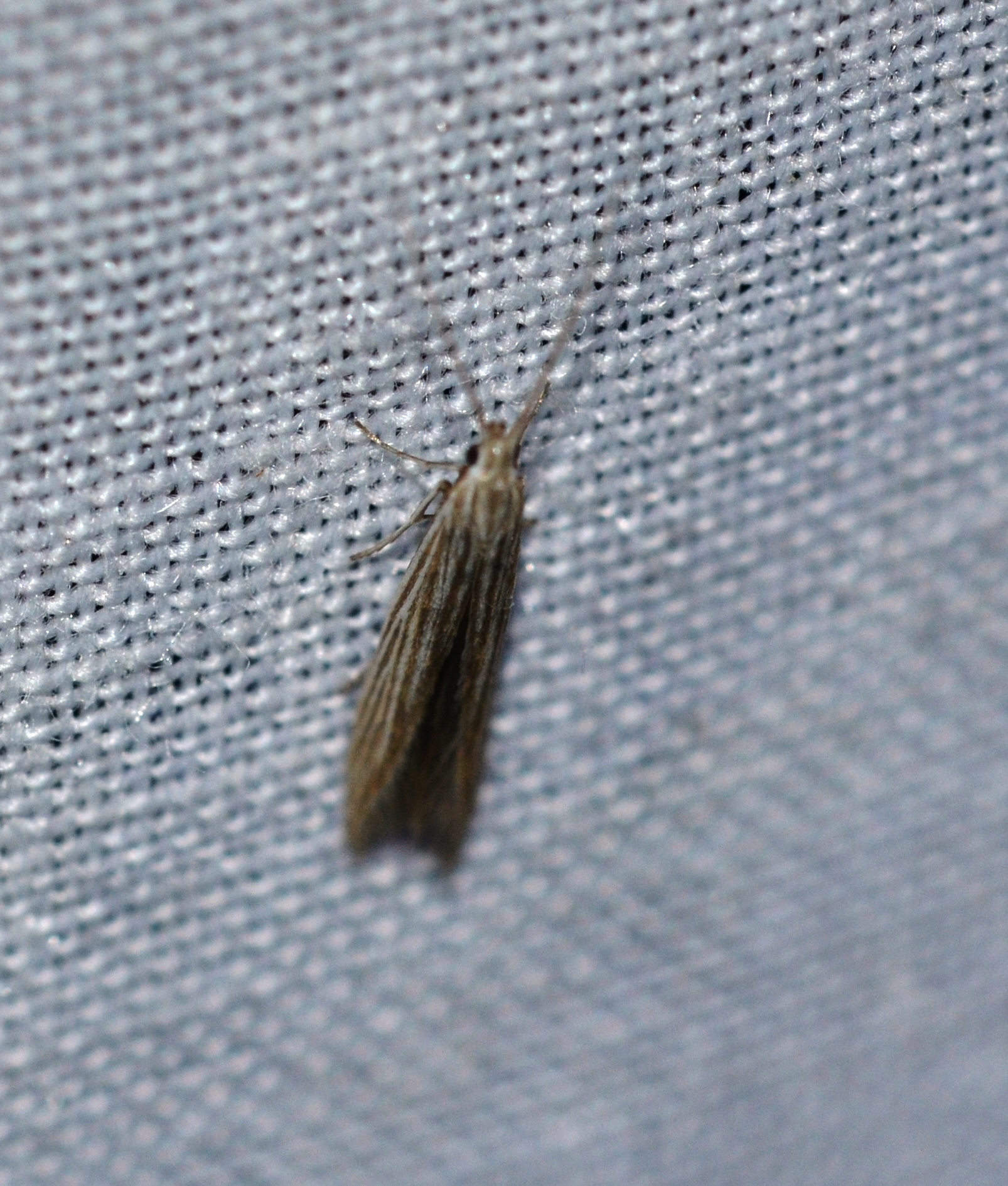

Scientific classification
- Domain: Eukaryota
- Kingdom: Animalia
- Phylum: Arthropoda
- Class: Insecta
- Order: Lepidoptera
- Family: Gelechiidae
- Genus: Helcystogramma
- Species: H. hystricella

Binomial name
- Helcystogramma hystricella (Braun, 1921)

Synonyms
- Brachmia hystricella Braun, 1921

= Helcystogramma hystricella =

Species of moth

Helcystogramma hystricella, the lanceolate helcystogramma moth, is a moth in the family Gelechiidae. It is found in the United States, where it has been recorded from Minnesota to Pennsylvania, south to Maryland and Kentucky, west to Oklahoma and Kansas.

The wingspan is 13–15 mm.

The larvae feed on grasses, including Elymus hystrix. They roll the leaves of their host plant. The species overwinters in the larval stage in a rolled leaf.

== Etymology ==
The species name refers to the former generic name of the host plant Hystrix patula (now known as Elymus hystrix).
