= Helcystogramma virescens =

Scientific classification
- Domain: Eukaryota
- Kingdom: Animalia
- Phylum: Arthropoda
- Class: Insecta
- Order: Lepidoptera
- Family: Gelechiidae
- Genus: Helcystogramma
- Species: H. virescens

Binomial name
- Helcystogramma virescens (Walsingham, 1911)

Synonyms
- Brachmia virescens Walsingham, 1911

Species of moth

Helcystogramma virescens is a moth in the family Gelechiidae. It was described by Thomas de Grey, 6th Baron Walsingham, in 1911. It is found in Mexico (Guerrero).

The wingspan is about 13 mm. The forewings are pale olivaceous greenish, with fuscous cloud-like spots. One at the base of the costa, reduplicated on the base of the cell, the lower portion stretching a little beyond the upper, one a little beyond the middle of the cell, reduplicated on the upper edge of the fold, below and a little beyond it, one on the costa before the cilia, and another, smaller and more clearly defined, a little before it on the end of the cell. The wing-surface is somewhat sprinkled with fuscous scales, and a series of fuscous spots along the middle of the terminal cilia is continued around the apex, with which exception the cilia are pale greenish ochreous. The hindwings are pale rosy grey.
