= Helcystogramma microsema =

Scientific classification
- Kingdom: Animalia
- Phylum: Arthropoda
- Class: Insecta
- Order: Lepidoptera
- Family: Gelechiidae
- Genus: Helcystogramma
- Species: H. microsema

Binomial name
- Helcystogramma microsema (Meyrick, 1911)

Synonyms
- Brachmia microsema Meyrick, 1911

Species of moth

Helcystogramma microsema is a moth in the family Gelechiidae. It was described by Edward Meyrick in 1911. It is found on the Seychelles, where it has been recorded from Mahé.

The wingspan is about 15 mm. The forewings are dark purplish fuscous, the stigmata black, with the plical beneath the first discal, edged anteriorly by a small whitish dot. There is an ochreous-whitish dot on the costa at three-fourths. The hindwings are grey.
