= Helcystogramma aruritis =

Scientific classification
- Kingdom: Animalia
- Phylum: Arthropoda
- Class: Insecta
- Order: Lepidoptera
- Family: Gelechiidae
- Genus: Helcystogramma
- Species: H. aruritis

Binomial name
- Helcystogramma aruritis (Meyrick, 1911)

Synonyms
- Brachmia aruritis Meyrick, 1911

Species of moth

Helcystogramma aruritis is a moth in the family Gelechiidae. It was described by Edward Meyrick in 1911. It is known from Sri Lanka.

The wingspan is 11–13 mm. The forewings are rather dark purplish fuscous, the veins marked by lines of black irroration (sprinkles), partially and variably edged with whitish-ochreous dashes and lines, especially subcostal and plical lines towards the base, and a subterminal series of dashes. The stigmata is obscure, blackish, partially edged with whitish ochreous, and the plical is elongate, all tending to be merged in the dark streaks. The hindwings are grey.
