= Helcystogramma phryganitis =

Scientific classification
- Kingdom: Animalia
- Phylum: Arthropoda
- Class: Insecta
- Order: Lepidoptera
- Family: Gelechiidae
- Genus: Helcystogramma
- Species: H. phryganitis

Binomial name
- Helcystogramma phryganitis (Meyrick, 1911)

Synonyms
- Brachmia phryganitis Meyrick, 1911; Onebala phryganitis Meyrick, 1911

Species of moth

Helcystogramma phryganitis is a moth in the family Gelechiidae. It was described by Edward Meyrick in 1911. It is found in Sri Lanka.

The wingspan is 16–18 mm. The forewings are ochreous whitish irregularly mixed with fuscous, suffusedly streaked with brown between the veins, these streaks in the disc and towards the base are marked with lines of black scales and there is a blackish dot towards the costa before the middle. The stigmata is black, with the discal connected by a black streak which is extended to the apex, thickest posteriorly, with the plical represented by an elongate mark. There is also a patch of blackish irroration (sprinkles) about the fold beyond the middle. The hindwings are pale grey.
