= Helcystogramma hapalyntis =

Scientific classification
- Kingdom: Animalia
- Phylum: Arthropoda
- Class: Insecta
- Order: Lepidoptera
- Family: Gelechiidae
- Genus: Helcystogramma
- Species: H. hapalyntis

Binomial name
- Helcystogramma hapalyntis (Meyrick, 1911)

Synonyms
- Brachmia hapalyntis Meyrick, 1911; Scieropepla hapalyntis

Species of moth

Helcystogramma hapalyntis is a moth of the family Gelechiidae. It was described by Turner in 1919. It is found in Australia, Sri Lanka and India.

The wingspan is 10–12 mm. The forewings are pale ochreous, irregularly clouded with brownish and sprinkled with dark fuscous. The hindwings are pale grey.
