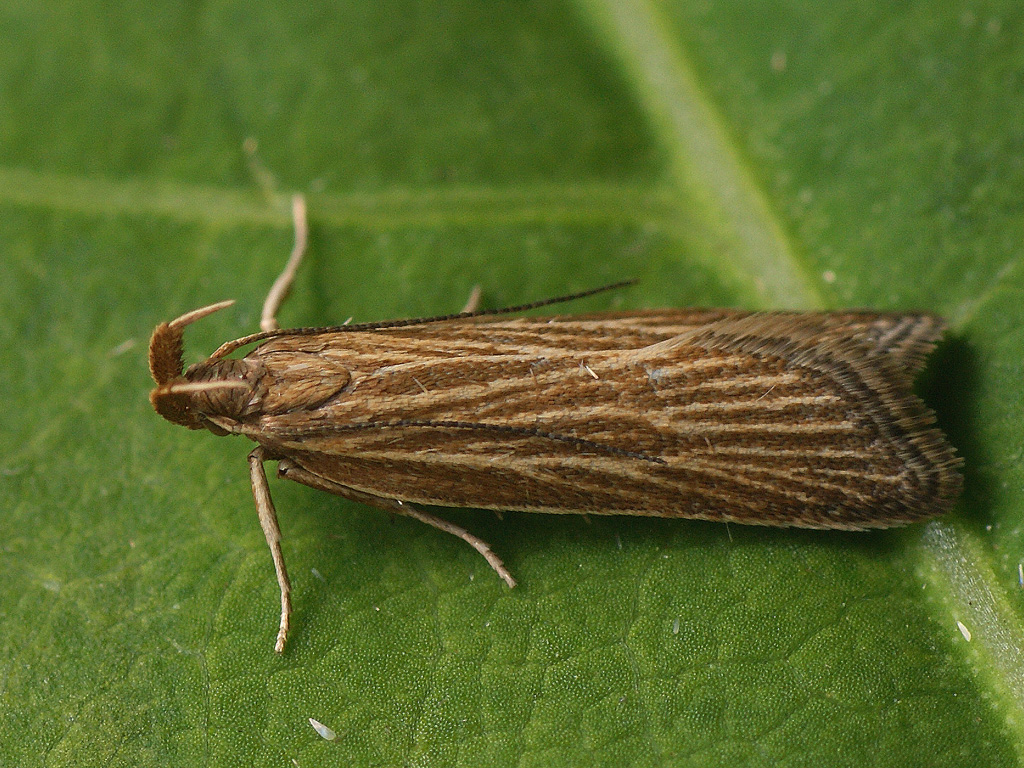

Scientific classification
- Domain: Eukaryota
- Kingdom: Animalia
- Phylum: Arthropoda
- Class: Insecta
- Order: Lepidoptera
- Family: Gelechiidae
- Genus: Helcystogramma
- Species: H. albinervis

Binomial name
- Helcystogramma albinervis (Gerasimov, 1929)

Synonyms
- Nothris albinervis Gerasimov, 1929

= Helcystogramma albinervis =

Species of moth

Helcystogramma albinervis is a moth in the family Gelechiidae. It was described by Aleksey Maksimovich Gerasimov in 1929. It is found in Hungary, Romania, Slovakia, Poland, Latvia, Ukraine and Russia.

The wingspan is about 15 mm.
