= Helcystogramma stellatella =

Scientific classification
- Kingdom: Animalia
- Phylum: Arthropoda
- Clade: Pancrustacea
- Class: Insecta
- Order: Lepidoptera
- Family: Gelechiidae
- Genus: Helcystogramma
- Species: H. stellatella

Binomial name
- Helcystogramma stellatella (Busck, 1914)

Synonyms
- Dichomeris stellatella Busck, 1914

Species of moth

Helcystogramma stellatella is a moth in the family Gelechiidae. It was described by August Busck in 1914. It is found in Panama.

The wingspan is about 9 mm. The forewings are dark brown suffused with metallic blue and with scattered single silvery and light blue scales, a few of these congregate to form an ill-defined costal spot at the apical third. The hindwings are dark brownish fuscous.
