= Helcystogramma engraptum =

Scientific classification
- Kingdom: Animalia
- Phylum: Arthropoda
- Class: Insecta
- Order: Lepidoptera
- Family: Gelechiidae
- Genus: Helcystogramma
- Species: H. engraptum

Binomial name
- Helcystogramma engraptum (Meyrick, 1918)

Synonyms
- Brachmia engrapta Meyrick, 1918

Species of moth

Helcystogramma engraptum is a moth in the family Gelechiidae. It was described by Edward Meyrick in 1918. It is known from Pakistan and India.

The wingspan is 12–14 mm. The forewings are brown, with the cell clouded fuscous and with suffused fuscous interneural streaks, in females two beneath the apex sprinkled with blackish. The stigmata is indicated by some darker suffusion, and the lateral margins are marked by small cloudy whitish dots, with the plical rather before the first discal. There is an obscure cloudy whitish dot on the costa at three-fourths, where a faint paler angulated shade crosses the wing. There are indications of dark fuscous marginal dots around the apex and termen. The hindwings are light grey.

The larvae feed on Ipomoea batatas.
