= Helcystogramma lithostrotum =

Scientific classification
- Kingdom: Animalia
- Phylum: Arthropoda
- Class: Insecta
- Order: Lepidoptera
- Family: Gelechiidae
- Genus: Helcystogramma
- Species: H. lithostrotum

Binomial name
- Helcystogramma lithostrotum Meyrick, 1916

Synonyms
- Helcystogramma lithostrota Meyrick, 1916; Onebala lithostrota Meyrick, 1925

Species of moth

Helcystogramma lithostrotum is a moth in the family Gelechiidae. It was described by Edward Meyrick in 1916. It is known from Malaysia.

The wingspan is about 17 mm. The forewings are shining leaden grey with a thick blackish streak above the middle from the base, reaching the costa at the base, terminated by a large irregular ochreous-orange blotch extending in the disc above middle from one-fourth to two-thirds and reaching the costa towards the middle, preceded and followed on the costa by some blackish suffusion. There is an elongate irregularly semi-oval blackish blotch extending along the dorsum from one-fourth to two-thirds and reaching halfway across the wing, abutting on the orange blotch. There is also a fine transverse whitish-ochreous line at four-fifths, very slightly angulated in the middle, edged with blackish suffusion which is considerably dilated towards the tornus. A pale greyish-ochreous streak follows this on the upper half, continued along the costa and termen to near the tornus. There is also a blackish marginal line round the posterior part of the costa and termen. The hindwings are dark fuscous.
