= Helcystogramma neurograpta =

Scientific classification
- Kingdom: Animalia
- Phylum: Arthropoda
- Class: Insecta
- Order: Lepidoptera
- Family: Gelechiidae
- Genus: Helcystogramma
- Species: H. neurograpta

Binomial name
- Helcystogramma neurograpta (Meyrick, 1921)

Synonyms
- Brachmia neurograpta Meyrick, 1921

Species of moth

Helcystogramma neurograpta is a moth in the family Gelechiidae. It was described by Edward Meyrick in 1921. It is found in Zimbabwe.

The wingspan is 12–13 mm. The forewings are dark violet grey, the veins and the fold are more or less streaked with black. A small obscure light brownish 8-shaped spot is found at the end of the cell, edged in the middle anteriorly and sometimes also posteriorly by a minute white dot. There are some small black marginal dots around the apex and termen, around the apex separated by minute whitish dots. The hindwings are grey.
