= Helcystogramma juventellus =

Scientific classification
- Kingdom: Animalia
- Phylum: Arthropoda
- Class: Insecta
- Order: Lepidoptera
- Family: Gelechiidae
- Genus: Helcystogramma
- Species: H. juventellus

Binomial name
- Helcystogramma juventellus (Walsingham, 1897)

Synonyms
- Ypsolophus juventellus Walsingham, 1897; Untomia horista Walsingham, 1911

Species of moth

Helcystogramma juventellus is a moth in the family Gelechiidae. It was described by Thomas de Grey, 6th Baron Walsingham, in 1897. It is found in Jamaica and Mexico (Tabasco).

The wingspan is about 7 mm. The forewings are whitish on the costal half towards the base, becoming greyish towards the dorsum and brownish ochreous about and beyond the end of the cell. There is a slender black streak at the extreme base of the costa, followed by a very short oblique black streak at one-fourth and a broader oblique black streak at the middle. This is separated by a narrow oblique white streak from an elongate blackish costal blotch, which is somewhat triangular and terminates in a curved reduplicated blackish line in the apical cilia. This blotch contains an outwardly oblique slender line, pointing to a small black spot in a white patch before the apex, another slender white line meeting it at an angle from the dorsum. There is a small pale space on the fold at about half the wing-length, containing a few blackish scales. The terminal cilia is hoary, speckled with greyish fuscous. The hindwings are greyish brown.
