= Helcystogramma musicopa =

Scientific classification
- Kingdom: Animalia
- Phylum: Arthropoda
- Class: Insecta
- Order: Lepidoptera
- Family: Gelechiidae
- Genus: Helcystogramma
- Species: H. musicopa

Binomial name
- Helcystogramma musicopa (Meyrick, 1908)

Synonyms
- Brachmia musicopa Meyrick, 1908

Species of moth

Helcystogramma musicopa is a moth in the family Gelechiidae. It was described by Edward Meyrick in 1908. It is found in North Kivu in the Democratic Republic of the Congo and Gauteng in South Africa.

The wingspan is 13–14 mm. The forewings are purplish grey, the veins marked with well-defined lines of black and brown irroration (sprinkles). There is a fine costal streak from the base to four-fifths, another subcostal from the base to the middle, and a more or less broad dorsal suffusion from the base to three-fourths, all ochreous whitish, sometimes partially tinged with yellowish. The second discal stigma is represented by a round whitish-yellowish spot, marked beneath or almost wholly suffused with ochreous brown, sometimes centred with dark fuscous. The hindwings are whitish grey.
