= Helcystogramma tegulella =

Scientific classification
- Domain: Eukaryota
- Kingdom: Animalia
- Phylum: Arthropoda
- Class: Insecta
- Order: Lepidoptera
- Family: Gelechiidae
- Genus: Helcystogramma
- Species: H. tegulella

Binomial name
- Helcystogramma tegulella (Walsingham, 1897)

Synonyms
- Trichotaphe tegulella Walsingham, 1897; Dichomeris servilis Walsingham, 1911

Species of moth

Helcystogramma tegulella is a moth in the family Gelechiidae. It was described by Thomas de Grey, 6th Baron Walsingham, in 1897. It is found in Panama, the West Indies and Guyana.

The wingspan is about 13 mm. The forewings are dark purplish fuscous, the dorsum narrowly streaked with ochreous sparsely sprinkled with fuscous, the upper edge of the ochreous dorsal streak throwing up two very slight angular projections, one before, and one just behind the middle. On the costa, at the point where it commences to be depressed to the apex, is a small whitish ochreous spot, giving rise to a slender faint line of pale ochreous scaling, which is continued straight across to the tornus, and to a series of about seven pale ochreous marginal dots continued also to the tornus. Beyond these spots the base of the pale dusky greyish cilia is indicated by a dark fuscous line. The hindwings are greyish fuscous.
