= Helcystogramma simplex =

Scientific classification
- Domain: Eukaryota
- Kingdom: Animalia
- Phylum: Arthropoda
- Class: Insecta
- Order: Lepidoptera
- Family: Gelechiidae
- Genus: Helcystogramma
- Species: H. simplex

Binomial name
- Helcystogramma simplex (Walsingham, 1900)

Synonyms
- Onebala simplex Walsingham, 1900

Species of moth

Helcystogramma simplex is a moth in the family Gelechiidae. It was described by Thomas de Grey, 6th Baron Walsingham, in 1900. It is found in Yemen (Socotra).

The wingspan is about 11.5 mm. The forewings are pale fawn-ochreous, slightly shaded with greyish fuscous, especially above the fold and before the apex and termen. There are three blackish spots, the first on the cell before the middle, another in the fold straight below it and the third at the end of the cell. There are also four or five blackish dentate spots along the termen at the base of the greyish ochreous cilia which have a paler basal line. The hindwings are pale greyish, the central portion slightly iridescent.
