= Helcystogramma tristellum =

Scientific classification
- Kingdom: Animalia
- Phylum: Arthropoda
- Class: Insecta
- Order: Lepidoptera
- Family: Gelechiidae
- Genus: Helcystogramma
- Species: H. tristellum

Binomial name
- Helcystogramma tristellum (Snellen, 1901)

Synonyms
- Ceratophora tristella Snellen, 1901; Brachmia tristella Snellen, 1901

Species of moth

Helcystogramma tristellum is a moth in the family Gelechiidae. It was described by Snellen in 1901. It is found in the Philippines and on Java.
