= Helcystogramma arulensis =

Scientific classification
- Domain: Eukaryota
- Kingdom: Animalia
- Phylum: Arthropoda
- Class: Insecta
- Order: Lepidoptera
- Family: Gelechiidae
- Genus: Helcystogramma
- Species: H. arulensis

Binomial name
- Helcystogramma arulensis (Rebel, 1929)

Synonyms
- Brachmia arulensis Rebel, 1929

Species of moth

Helcystogramma arulensis is a moth in the family Gelechiidae. It was described by Rebel in 1929. It is found in Italy, Switzerland, Austria, Hungary, the Czech Republic, Slovakia, Romania, Ukraine and Russia.

The wingspan is 13–14 mm.
