= Helcystogramma leucoplectum =

Scientific classification
- Kingdom: Animalia
- Phylum: Arthropoda
- Class: Insecta
- Order: Lepidoptera
- Family: Gelechiidae
- Genus: Helcystogramma
- Species: H. leucoplectum

Binomial name
- Helcystogramma leucoplectum (Meyrick, 1911)

Synonyms
- Strobisia leucoplecta Meyrick, 1911; Onebala leucoplecta Meyrick, 1925

Species of moth

Helcystogramma leucoplectum is a moth in the family Gelechiidae. It was described by Edward Meyrick in 1911. It is known from India, Java, Indonesia and Sri Lanka.

The wingspan is 8–9 mm. The forewings are olive ochreous suffusedly mixed with blackish, towards the posterior half of the costa and entire terminal area wholly suffused with blackish. The markings are leaden metallic edged with black and there is a broad streak along the costa from the base to the middle, thence continued across the wing to three-fourths of the dorsum, connected also at one-fourth with a blotch on the basal portion of the dorsum. There is a rounded-transverse white spot on the costa at three-fifths, touching a leaden-metallic spot in the disc beneath it. There is also an irregular thick transverse streak close before the termen, leaving the termen olive ochreous edged with a black marginal line. The hindwings are rather dark grey.
