= Helcystogramma sertigera =

Scientific classification
- Domain: Eukaryota
- Kingdom: Animalia
- Phylum: Arthropoda
- Class: Insecta
- Order: Lepidoptera
- Family: Gelechiidae
- Genus: Helcystogramma
- Species: H. sertigera

Binomial name
- Helcystogramma sertigera Meyrick, 1923

Species of moth

Helcystogramma sertigera is a moth in the family Gelechiidae. It was described by Edward Meyrick in 1923. It is found in Peru.

The wingspan is about 12 mm. The forewings are glossy blue leaden and with a streak of blackish suffusion on the fold from one-fifth to near the middle of the wing. There is a small yellow-ochreous spot in the disc at two-fifths, from which a streak of blackish suffusion runs to a broad irregular-edged yellow-ochreous transverse fascia at three-fourths, preceded by blackish suffusion and including an irregular blue-leaden blotch. The terminal area beyond this is chestnut brown, with three minute yellow-whitish dots on the costa. The hindwings are dark fuscous.
