= Helcystogramma lyrella =

Scientific classification
- Domain: Eukaryota
- Kingdom: Animalia
- Phylum: Arthropoda
- Class: Insecta
- Order: Lepidoptera
- Family: Gelechiidae
- Genus: Helcystogramma
- Species: H. lyrella

Binomial name
- Helcystogramma lyrella (Walsingham, 1911)

Synonyms
- Dichomeris lyrella Walsingham, 1911

Species of moth

Helcystogramma lyrella is a moth in the family Gelechiidae. It was described by Thomas de Grey, 6th Baron Walsingham, in 1911. It is found in Guatemala.

The wingspan is about 15 mm. The forewings are fawn-brown, with each vein distinctly marked with pale fawn-ochreous and with a small darker brown spot on the disc, before the middle of the wing. There is an elongate spot of the same colour straight below it in the fold, followed by another at the end of the cell. There is also a slender dark terminal line, more or less broken into spots. The hindwings are pale straw-grey.
