= Helcystogramma brevinodium =

Scientific classification
- Domain: Eukaryota
- Kingdom: Animalia
- Phylum: Arthropoda
- Class: Insecta
- Order: Lepidoptera
- Family: Gelechiidae
- Genus: Helcystogramma
- Species: H. brevinodium

Binomial name
- Helcystogramma brevinodium H.-H. Li & Zhen, 2011

Species of moth

Helcystogramma brevinodium is a moth in the family Gelechiidae. It was described by Hou-Hun Li and Hui Zhen in 2011. It is found in the Chinese provinces of Hebei and Tianjin.

The wingspan is about 15 mm.
