= Helcystogramma hemiopa =

Scientific classification
- Kingdom: Animalia
- Phylum: Arthropoda
- Class: Insecta
- Order: Lepidoptera
- Family: Gelechiidae
- Genus: Helcystogramma
- Species: H. hemiopa

Binomial name
- Helcystogramma hemiopa (Meyrick, 1921)

Synonyms
- Brachmia hemiopa Meyrick, 1921

Species of moth

Helcystogramma hemiopa is a moth in the family Gelechiidae. It was described by Edward Meyrick in 1921. It is found on the Seychelles and in South Africa and Zimbabwe.

The wingspan is 12–13 mm. The forewings are brown with the extreme costal edge ochreous whitish. The discal stigmata is hardly darker, edged above by crescentic whitish marks, with the plical rather obliquely before the first discal, cloudy, dark fuscous, edged on each side with white. There is a more or less obscurely indicated pale ochreous somewhat angulated shade from three-fourths of the costa to the tornus. The hindwings are rather light grey.
