= Helcystogramma nesidias =

Scientific classification
- Kingdom: Animalia
- Phylum: Arthropoda
- Class: Insecta
- Order: Lepidoptera
- Family: Gelechiidae
- Genus: Helcystogramma
- Species: H. nesidias

Binomial name
- Helcystogramma nesidias (Meyrick, 1911)

Synonyms
- Brachmia nesidias Meyrick, 1911

Species of moth

Helcystogramma nesidias is a moth in the family Gelechiidae. It was described by Edward Meyrick in 1911. It is found on the Seychelles, where it has been recorded from Mahé, Praslin and Silhouette.

The wingspan is 10–11 mm. The forewings are pale whitish ochreous, longitudinally streaked with ferruginous-brownish suffusion between the veins. The plical and first discal stigmata are indicated by a few longitudinally scattered dark fuscous scales, the second discal forming a distinct dark fuscous dot. There are some dark fuscous scales on the termen towards the apex. The hindwings are pale grey.
