= Helcystogramma chalyburga =

Scientific classification
- Kingdom: Animalia
- Phylum: Arthropoda
- Class: Insecta
- Order: Lepidoptera
- Family: Gelechiidae
- Genus: Helcystogramma
- Species: H. chalyburga

Binomial name
- Helcystogramma chalyburga Meyrick, 1922

Species of moth

Helcystogramma chalyburga is a moth in the family Gelechiidae. It was described by Edward Meyrick in 1922. It is found in Pará, Brazil.

The wingspan is about 13 mm. The forewings are brown with three shining dark blue-grey fasciae finely edged with blackish, the first basal, occupying one-third of the wing, the second moderate, rather irregular, from the middle of the costa to beyond the middle of the dorsum, the third subterminal, moderate, pointed beneath and not quite reaching the dorsum, the costal end marked anteriorly with a small white spot. The dorsum between these fasciae is suffused with dark fuscous. The terminal area is dark fuscous with a terminal series of minute blue-grey dots. The hindwings are dark fuscous.
