= Helcystogramma subvectella =

Scientific classification
- Kingdom: Animalia
- Phylum: Arthropoda
- Class: Insecta
- Order: Lepidoptera
- Family: Gelechiidae
- Genus: Helcystogramma
- Species: H. subvectella

Binomial name
- Helcystogramma subvectella (Walker, 1864)

Synonyms
- Gelechia subvectella Walker, 1864

Species of moth

Helcystogramma subvectella is a moth in the family Gelechiidae. It was described by Francis Walker in 1864. It is found in Amazonas, Brazil.

Adults are dark cupreous, the forewings with four chalybeous (steel-blue) bands, the first near the base and the fourth near the exterior border.
