= Helcystogramma crypsinomum =

Scientific classification
- Kingdom: Animalia
- Phylum: Arthropoda
- Class: Insecta
- Order: Lepidoptera
- Family: Gelechiidae
- Genus: Helcystogramma
- Species: H. crypsinomum

Binomial name
- Helcystogramma crypsinomum (Meyrick, 1929)

Synonyms
- Brachmia crypsinoma Meyrick, 1929

Species of moth

Helcystogramma crypsinomum is a moth in the family Gelechiidae. It was described by Edward Meyrick in 1929. It is known from Thailand.

The wingspan is about 15 mm. The forewings are rather dark fuscous, the stigmata cloudy, blackish fuscous, with the plical somewhat before the first discal. The hindwings are grey.
