= Helcystogramma spilopis =

Scientific classification
- Kingdom: Animalia
- Phylum: Arthropoda
- Class: Insecta
- Order: Lepidoptera
- Family: Gelechiidae
- Genus: Helcystogramma
- Species: H. spilopis

Binomial name
- Helcystogramma spilopis (Meyrick, 1927)

Synonyms
- Brachmia spilopis Meyrick, 1927

Species of moth

Helcystogramma spilopis is a moth in the family Gelechiidae. It was described by Edward Meyrick in 1927. It is found in Zimbabwe.

The wingspan is about 12 mm. The forewings are rather dark grey, slightly pale speckled and with some blackish scales on the veins. The plical and first discal stigmata are represented by small white dots, the plical obliquely posterior, the second discal represented by a transverse-oval pale ochreous spot edged laterally with white in the middle and containing two minute blackish dots placed longitudinally. There is a white dot on the costa before three-fourths and there are some minute white dots on the apical part of the costa and termen separated by blackish irroration (sprinkles). The hindwings are grey.
