= Helcystogramma meconitis =

Scientific classification
- Kingdom: Animalia
- Phylum: Arthropoda
- Class: Insecta
- Order: Lepidoptera
- Family: Gelechiidae
- Genus: Helcystogramma
- Species: H. meconitis

Binomial name
- Helcystogramma meconitis (Meyrick, 1913)

Synonyms
- Trichotaphe meconitis Meyrick, 1913

Species of moth

Helcystogramma meconitis is a moth in the family Gelechiidae. It was described by Edward Meyrick in 1913. It is found in Argentina.

The wingspan is about 14 mm. The forewings are fuscous, slightly purplish tinged with some whitish-ochreous suffusion towards the base of the dorsum, above which is a short dark fuscous dash. The discal stigmata are undefined, dark fuscous, each followed by a pale ochreous dot and the plical stigma is represented by an elongate blackish dash, edged beneath with whitish ochreous. The veins posteriorly are partially marked with ferruginous-brownish lines and scattered blackish scales and there is a patch of whitish-ochreous irroration (sprinkles) extending from the costa before the apex downwards to the disc. There is also a terminal series of cloudy blackish dots edged anteriorly with whitish ochreous. The hindwings are light fuscous.
