= Helcystogramma chalybea =

Scientific classification
- Domain: Eukaryota
- Kingdom: Animalia
- Phylum: Arthropoda
- Class: Insecta
- Order: Lepidoptera
- Family: Gelechiidae
- Genus: Helcystogramma
- Species: H. chalybea

Binomial name
- Helcystogramma chalybea (C. Felder, R. Felder & Rogenhofer, 1875)

Synonyms
- Simaethis chalybea Felder & Rogenhofer, 1875

Species of moth

Helcystogramma chalybea is a moth in the family Gelechiidae. It was described by Cajetan Felder, Rudolf Felder and Alois Friedrich Rogenhofer in 1875. It is found in Brazil.
