= Helcystogramma infibulatum =

Scientific classification
- Kingdom: Animalia
- Phylum: Arthropoda
- Class: Insecta
- Order: Lepidoptera
- Family: Gelechiidae
- Genus: Helcystogramma
- Species: H. infibulatum

Binomial name
- Helcystogramma infibulatum Meyrick, 1916

Synonyms
- Helcystogramma infibulata Meyrick, 1916; Onebala infibulata Meyrick, 1925

Species of moth

Helcystogramma infibulatum is a moth in the family Gelechiidae. It was described by Edward Meyrick in 1916. It is known from India and Sri Lanka.

The wingspan is about 10 mm (0.39 in). The forewings are dark brown with a thick light ochreous-brown streak along the dorsum from the base to three-fourths, the upper edge shortly prominent before the middle of the wing, edged with white from the base to this, the ground colour suffused with dark fuscous towards it. There is a broad grey postmedian band included between two rather oblique white lines, edged with dark fuscous anteriorly, first strongly suffused with white on the upper half posteriorly, second running to the tornus, enlarged into a white triangular spot on the costa, within this band is an elongate-oval dark fuscous finely white-edged blotch in the disc. There is also a white streak along the lower part of the termen, including two black linear dots, sometimes extended around the apex. The hindwings are light grey.
