= Helcystogramma helicopis =

Scientific classification
- Kingdom: Animalia
- Phylum: Arthropoda
- Class: Insecta
- Order: Lepidoptera
- Family: Gelechiidae
- Genus: Helcystogramma
- Species: H. helicopis

Binomial name
- Helcystogramma helicopis (Meyrick, 1922)

Synonyms
- Strobisia helicopis Meyrick, 1922

Species of moth

Helcystogramma helicopis is a moth in the family Gelechiidae. It was described by Edward Meyrick in 1922. It is found in Peru and Amazonas, Brazil.

The wingspan is 12–13 mm. The forewings are blackish with the extreme base grey and with a narrow irregular grey subbasal fascia, which is metallic blue on the costa. Beyond this is an irregular metallic-blue transverse line not reaching the costa. There is also an oblique metallic-blue streak from a white dot on the costa at two-fifths to the middle of the wing, as well as an irregular zigzag metallic-blue transverse line at three-fifths, not reaching the costa. A nearly straight grey line runs from a white dot on the costa at three-fifths to the dorsum at three-fourths and there is a pale iridescent-grey marginal line around the apex and termen, preceded by an irregular-edged narrow metallic-blue fascia. The hindwings are dark fuscous.
