= Helcystogramma rusticella =

Scientific classification
- Kingdom: Animalia
- Phylum: Arthropoda
- Class: Insecta
- Order: Lepidoptera
- Family: Gelechiidae
- Genus: Helcystogramma
- Species: H. rusticella

Binomial name
- Helcystogramma rusticella (Walker, 1864)

Synonyms
- Gelechia rusticella Walker, 1864

Species of moth

Helcystogramma rusticella is a moth in the family Gelechiidae. It was described by Francis Walker in 1864. It is found in Amazonas, Brazil.

Adults are cupreous, the forewings with a broad irregular speckled cinereous band and a slightly zigzag transverse line between the band and the base of the wing, as well as a few minute cinereous marks near the costa and continuous to a metallic-purple submarginal band. The hindwings are whitish along the costa.
