= Helcystogramma compositaepictum =

Scientific classification
- Domain: Eukaryota
- Kingdom: Animalia
- Phylum: Arthropoda
- Class: Insecta
- Order: Lepidoptera
- Family: Gelechiidae
- Genus: Helcystogramma
- Species: H. compositaepictum

Binomial name
- Helcystogramma compositaepictum (N. Omelko & M. Omelko, 1993)

Synonyms
- Schemataspis compositaepicta N. Omelko & M. Omelko, 1993

Species of moth

Helcystogramma compositaepictum is a moth in the family Gelechiidae. It was described by Natalia Viktorovna Omelko and Mikhail Mikhailovich Omelko in 1993. It is known from Russia, where it has been recorded from south-eastern Siberia.
