= Helcystogramma pantheropa =

Scientific classification
- Kingdom: Animalia
- Phylum: Arthropoda
- Class: Insecta
- Order: Lepidoptera
- Family: Gelechiidae
- Genus: Helcystogramma
- Species: H. pantheropa

Binomial name
- Helcystogramma pantheropa (Meyrick, 1913)

Synonyms
- Brachmia pantheropa Meyrick, 1913; Onebala pantheropa Meyrick, 1913

Species of moth

Helcystogramma pantheropa is a moth in the family Gelechiidae. It was described by Edward Meyrick in 1913. It is found in South Africa.

The wingspan is 12–13 mm. The forewings are dark ashy fuscous, slightly whitish sprinkled with a slight pale ochreous dash beneath the costa near the base and a pale yellow-ochreous transverse blotch representing the plical and first discal stigmata, reaching the dorsum, more or less brownish suffused except on the margins. There is also a blackish or dark brown spot representing the second discal, sometimes edged with pale yellow ochreous, as well as a triangular suffused pale yellow-ochreous spot on the costa at three-fourths, where a very fine indistinct angulated line of pale ochreous scales runs to the tornus. The hindwings are dark grey.
