= Helcystogramma trigonella =

Scientific classification
- Domain: Eukaryota
- Kingdom: Animalia
- Phylum: Arthropoda
- Class: Insecta
- Order: Lepidoptera
- Family: Gelechiidae
- Genus: Helcystogramma
- Species: H. trigonella

Binomial name
- Helcystogramma trigonella (Walsingham, 1892)

Synonyms
- Trichotaphe trigonella Walsingham, 1892

Species of moth

Helcystogramma trigonella is a moth in the family Gelechiidae. It was described by Thomas de Grey, 6th Baron Walsingham, in 1892. It is found in the West Indies.

The wingspan is about 11 mm. The forewings are greyish brown, with a small ferruginous spot at the end of the discal cell, margined on its upper and outer side with whitish-ochreous scales. There is a whitish-ochreous line from the base along the dorsal margin to the bulge of the wing, but not continued where the margin becomes straight. A faint whitish-ochreous spot or group of scales is found on the extreme costal margin at one-fifth from the apex. The hindwings are brownish grey, with a tuft of greyish-ochreous hairs above at the base.
