= Helcystogramma heterostigma =

Scientific classification
- Domain: Eukaryota
- Kingdom: Animalia
- Phylum: Arthropoda
- Class: Insecta
- Order: Lepidoptera
- Family: Gelechiidae
- Genus: Helcystogramma
- Species: H. heterostigma

Binomial name
- Helcystogramma heterostigma (Diakonoff, 1967)

Synonyms
- Hypatima heterostigma Diakonoff, 1967

Species of moth

Helcystogramma heterostigma is a moth in the family Gelechiidae. It was described by Alexey Diakonoff in 1967. It is known from the Philippines (Luzon).

The wingspan is 15–17 mm. The forewings are creamy, irrorated with light tawny, this irroration tending to form transverse bands. The extreme base of the costa has a small ferruginous mark and there is some slight purplish-black suffusion across the costa at one-sixth, as well as a large semi-oval brown spot along the costal excavation, slightly marbled with white, narrowly extended along the costa anteriorly. There are four light tawny costal dots before the apex becoming smaller posteriorly and a series of similar dots along the termen to the tornus The first discal stigma is large, circular and anthracite black, preceded by a transverse suffusion, an elongate spot below and slightly before the stigma and another smaller dot below this on the dorsum, all anthracite black. There is also an interrupted fuscous transverse streak forming a continuation of the anterior edge of the costal patch and an irregular, white-marbled roundish dark grey spot over the closing vein. A jet-black, anthracite oval spot is found at the apex with a small dot above, a larger one below this, on the wing margin. There is also a strongly curved transverse series of fuscous-suffused dots halfway between the cell and apex, suffused with pale fuscous tawny. The hindwings are light fuscous and glossy.
