= Helcystogramma cornuta =

Scientific classification
- Domain: Eukaryota
- Kingdom: Animalia
- Phylum: Arthropoda
- Class: Insecta
- Order: Lepidoptera
- Family: Gelechiidae
- Genus: Helcystogramma
- Species: H. cornuta

Binomial name
- Helcystogramma cornuta (Busck, 1914)

Synonyms
- Dichomeris cornuta Busck, 1914

Species of moth

Helcystogramma cornuta is a moth in the family Gelechiidae. It was described by August Busck in 1914. It is found in Panama.

The wingspan is about 13 mm. The forewings are light golden brown with the base of the costal edge and a large, triangular spot on the apical third of the costa dark brown, the edges of which are strongly iridescent. There is a dark brown spot at the end of the fold, surrounded by strongly iridescent scales. And there is a perpendicular, dark brown line at the apical fifth across the wing tip, edged exteriorly with a strongly iridescent patch of steel blue scales. The hindwings are dark fuscous.
