= Helcystogramma melantherella =

Scientific classification
- Kingdom: Animalia
- Phylum: Arthropoda
- Class: Insecta
- Order: Lepidoptera
- Family: Gelechiidae
- Genus: Helcystogramma
- Species: H. melantherella

Binomial name
- Helcystogramma melantherella (Busck, 1900)

Synonyms
- Trichotaphe melantherella Busck, 1900

Species of moth

Helcystogramma melantherella is a moth in the family Gelechiidae. It was described by August Busck in 1900. It is found in North America, where it has been recorded from North Carolina south to Florida and west to Texas and Arkansas.

== Appearance ==
The wingspan is 12.5–13 mm. The forewings are deep purplish brown, nearly black, with a satin luster. There is a short black streak before the middle of the wing, near the dorsal margin, edged anteriorly and posteriorly with a few white scales. There is also a small round black dot at the end of the cell, slightly edged posteriorly with white. A scarcely perceptible, outwardly angulated, narrow fascia of a paler shade is found at the apical fourth, terminating in a yellowish costal streak. The hindwings are dark purplish grey.

== Larvae ==
The larvae feed on Calyptocarpus vialis, Cynara scolymnus, Melanthera nivea and Xanthium strumarium.
