= Helcystogramma victrix =

Scientific classification
- Kingdom: Animalia
- Phylum: Arthropoda
- Class: Insecta
- Order: Lepidoptera
- Family: Gelechiidae
- Genus: Helcystogramma
- Species: H. victrix

Binomial name
- Helcystogramma victrix (Meyrick, 1911)

Synonyms
- Strobisia victrix Meyrick, 1911

Species of moth

Helcystogramma victrix is a moth in the family Gelechiidae. It was described by Edward Meyrick in 1911. It is found in southern India.

The wingspan is 10–12 mm. The forewings are blackish fuscous with violet-blue-metallic markings and with a streak along the costa from the base to one-third, then continued obliquely downwards to below the middle of the disc. There is a subdorsal streak from the base to near the middle and there is a spot on the dorsum at two-thirds, as well as a somewhat oblique slightly curved irregular fascia from two-thirds of the costa, reaching two-thirds of the way across the wing. There is an irregular fascia immediately before the termen, tending to be broken into three or four spots and the termen is tinged with fulvous, with a black marginal line. The hindwings are dark fuscous.
