= Helcystogramma conturbata =

Scientific classification
- Kingdom: Animalia
- Phylum: Arthropoda
- Class: Insecta
- Order: Lepidoptera
- Family: Gelechiidae
- Genus: Helcystogramma
- Species: H. conturbata

Binomial name
- Helcystogramma conturbata (Meyrick, 1933)

Synonyms
- Brachmia conturbata Meyrick, 1933

Species of moth

Helcystogramma conturbata is a moth in the family Gelechiidae. It was described by Edward Meyrick in 1933. It is found in Sierra Leone.
