= Helcystogramma brabylitis =

Scientific classification
- Kingdom: Animalia
- Phylum: Arthropoda
- Class: Insecta
- Order: Lepidoptera
- Family: Gelechiidae
- Genus: Helcystogramma
- Species: H. brabylitis

Binomial name
- Helcystogramma brabylitis (Meyrick, 1911)

Synonyms
- Strobisia brabylitis Meyrick, 1911; Onebala brabylitis Meyrick, 1925

Species of moth

Helcystogramma brabylitis is a moth in the family Gelechiidae. It was described by Edward Meyrick in 1911. It is known from south-eastern India and on Java in Indonesia.

The wingspan is about 12 mm. The forewings are bronzy blackish with leaden-bluish-metallic markings. There is a streak along the costa from the base to near the middle, as well as four rather narrow transverse fasciae, the first at one-third, expanded on the dorsum as a suffused patch to the base, the second oblique, from the extremity of the costal streak to the dorsum beyond the middle, the third from a triangular white spot on the costa at two-third, slightly curved, confluent with the second on the dorsum. The fourth is terminal. The hindwings are blackish fuscous.
