= Helcystogramma rhabduchum =

Scientific classification
- Kingdom: Animalia
- Phylum: Arthropoda
- Class: Insecta
- Order: Lepidoptera
- Family: Gelechiidae
- Genus: Helcystogramma
- Species: H. rhabduchum

Binomial name
- Helcystogramma rhabduchum (Meyrick, 1911)

Synonyms
- Strobisia rhabducha Meyrick, 1911; Schemataspis rhabducha Meyrick, 1911; Helcystogramma rhabducha (Meyrick, 1911)

Species of moth

Helcystogramma rhabduchum is a moth in the family Gelechiidae. It was described by Edward Meyrick in 1911. It is found in Sri Lanka and India.

The wingspan is 11–12 mm. The forewings are blackish fuscous with a pale grey supramedian streak from the base to beyond the middle, surmounted by an ochreous-yellow streak, both terminated by the upper portion of a strongly inwards-oblique elongate-oval ochreous-yellow ring. There are two oblique white streaks from the costa anteriorly running into the subcostal yellow streak, as well as an ochreous-yellow dash beneath the supramedian streak near the base. There is also an irregular oblique-transverse blotch of ground colour margined with ochreous yellow extending from the dorsum to the supramedian streak before the middle of the wing and the dorsal area before and beyond this is somewhat mixed with whitish, the area between the oblique discal ring and tornus suffused with white mixed with grey. There is a pale leaden-grey oblique streak from near the costa in the middle to the disc at two-thirds more or less edged on both sides with ochreous yellow, and a shorter white oblique streak from the costa adjacent to this posteriorly. Three short white strigulae are found on the costa posteriorly, from the third a straight leaden-metallic streak runs to the tornus, preceded on the lower two-thirds by four anteriorly confluent ochreous-yellowish longitudinal marks appearing to enclose three wedge-shaped marks of ground colour, and margined posteriorly by an ochreous-yellow terminal streak enclosing a black terminal line thickened beneath the apex. The hindwings are grey.
