= Helcystogramma chambersella =

Scientific classification
- Domain: Eukaryota
- Kingdom: Animalia
- Phylum: Arthropoda
- Class: Insecta
- Order: Lepidoptera
- Family: Gelechiidae
- Genus: Helcystogramma
- Species: H. chambersella

Binomial name
- Helcystogramma chambersella (Murtfeldt, 1874)

Synonyms
- Gelechia chambersella Murtfeldt, 1874; Gelechia subalbusella Chambers, 1874; Gelechia parvipulvella Chambers, 1874; Gelechia inaequepulvella Chambers, 1875; Brachmia subalbella Meyrick, 1925

Species of moth

Helcystogramma chambersella is a moth in the family Gelechiidae. It was described by Mary Murtfeldt in 1874. It is found in North America, where it has been recorded from Pennsylvania, Illinois, Ohio, South Carolina, Tennessee, Louisiana, Mississippi, Florida, Oklahoma, Missouri, Texas, Arizona and California.

The length of the forewings is 3.5–5 mm. Adults have been recorded on wing from April to September.

The larvae feed on Ambrosia artemisiifolia, Ambrosia confertifolia and Ambrosia ptilostachya.
