= Helcystogramma fernaldella =

Scientific classification
- Domain: Eukaryota
- Kingdom: Animalia
- Phylum: Arthropoda
- Class: Insecta
- Order: Lepidoptera
- Family: Gelechiidae
- Genus: Helcystogramma
- Species: H. fernaldella

Binomial name
- Helcystogramma fernaldella (Busck, 1903)

Synonyms
- Trichotaphe fernaldella Busck, 1903

Species of moth

Helcystogramma fernaldella, or Fernald's helcystogramma moth, is a moth in the family Gelechiidae. It was described by August Busck in 1903. It is found in North America, where it has been recorded from Alaska, Yukon and Alberta, east across Canada and the northern United States to New Brunswick and New England. The habitat consists of fields, meadows and grasslands.

The wingspan is 16–18 mm. Adults are mainly on wing from May to July.

The larvae feed on various grasses. The species overwinters in the larval stage.
