= Helcystogramma hoplophorum =

Scientific classification
- Kingdom: Animalia
- Phylum: Arthropoda
- Class: Insecta
- Order: Lepidoptera
- Family: Gelechiidae
- Genus: Helcystogramma
- Species: H. hoplophorum

Binomial name
- Helcystogramma hoplophorum Meyrick, 1916

Synonyms
- Helcystogramma hoplophora Meyrick, 1916; Onebala hoplophora Meyrick, 1925

Species of moth

Helcystogramma hoplophorum is a moth in the family Gelechiidae. It was described by Edward Meyrick in 1916. It is known from India, Sri Lanka, and Myanmar.

The wingspan is about 9 mm. The forewings are bronzy brown with violet-blue-metallic markings, somewhat edged with dark fuscous and with a streak along the costa from the base to beyond one-third, thence obliquely downwards to below the middle of the disc. There is a subdorsal streak from the base of the dorsum to beyond one-third and a transverse irregular streak at three-fifths. The costal extremity is white, the ground colour beyond this wholly dark fuscous. There is also an irregular waved streak just before the termen. The hindwings are dark fuscous.
