= Helcystogramma albilepidotum =

Scientific classification
- Domain: Eukaryota
- Kingdom: Animalia
- Phylum: Arthropoda
- Class: Insecta
- Order: Lepidoptera
- Family: Gelechiidae
- Genus: Helcystogramma
- Species: H. albilepidotum

Binomial name
- Helcystogramma albilepidotum H.-H. Li & Zhen, 2011

Species of moth

Helcystogramma albilepidotum is a moth in the family Gelechiidae. It was described by Hou-Hun Li and Hui Zhen in 2011. It is found in Sichuan, China.

The wingspan is about 15–16 mm.
