= Helcystogramma adaequata =

Scientific classification
- Domain: Eukaryota
- Kingdom: Animalia
- Phylum: Arthropoda
- Class: Insecta
- Order: Lepidoptera
- Family: Gelechiidae
- Genus: Helcystogramma
- Species: H. adaequata

Binomial name
- Helcystogramma adaequata Meyrick, 1914

Species of moth

Helcystogramma adaequata is a moth in the family Gelechiidae. It was described by Edward Meyrick in 1914. It is found in Guyana.

The wingspan is about 14 mm. The forewings are dark fuscous with a leaden-grey median streak from the base to the dorsal blotch. There is a large semi-oval blotch of ground colour partially suffused with ferruginous and finely edged with whitish, extending on the dorsum from one-fourth to three-fifths, its upper edge rather prominent in the middle and reaching two-thirds of the way across the wing. There is a thick blue-leaden-grey streak along the costa from the base to one-third, then continued along the posterior edge of the dorsal blotch to the dorsum, where it coalesces with a narrower slightly curved transverse streak from the costa beyond the middle, the space between these in the disc is occupied by two transversely placed oval spots of blackish-fuscous suffusion edged with whitish. There is also an oblique ochreous-whitish strigula from the costa at one-third, and a small spot on the costa at two-thirds, where a faint irregular line runs to the dorsum before the tornus. A blue-leaden-metallic line runs from the costa before the apex to the tornus, indented outwards and interrupted beneath the apex. There is also a black terminal line, edged with ochreous-whitish. The hindwings are dark fuscous.
