= Helcystogramma ribbeella =

Scientific classification
- Kingdom: Animalia
- Phylum: Arthropoda
- Clade: Pancrustacea
- Class: Insecta
- Order: Lepidoptera
- Family: Gelechiidae
- Genus: Helcystogramma
- Species: H. ribbeella

Binomial name
- Helcystogramma ribbeella (Zeller, 1877)

Synonyms
- Gelechia ribbeella Zeller, 1877; Dichomeris ribbeella

Species of moth

Helcystogramma ribbeella is a moth in the family Gelechiidae. It was described by Zeller in 1877. It is found in Panama.
