= Helcystogramma thesmiopa =

Scientific classification
- Kingdom: Animalia
- Phylum: Arthropoda
- Class: Insecta
- Order: Lepidoptera
- Family: Gelechiidae
- Genus: Helcystogramma
- Species: H. thesmiopa

Binomial name
- Helcystogramma thesmiopa (Meyrick, 1922)

Synonyms
- Dichomeris thesmiopa Meyrick, 1922

Species of moth

Helcystogramma thesmiopa is a moth in the family Gelechiidae. It was described by Edward Meyrick in 1922. It is found in Pará, Brazil.

The wingspan is about 12 mm. The forewings are violet grey with a transverse-oval blackish blotch, finely edged with white, resting on the middle of the dorsum and reaching three-fourths of the way across the wing, the anterior edge is prominent in the middle, and with the lower part of the blotch occupied (except for the margins) by a light grey irregular spot. There is a large black finely white-edged dot in disc at three-fifths and a fine slightly curved line of whitish irroration (sprinkles) from a wedge-shaped white mark on the costa at four-fifths to the dorsum before the tornus. There is a marginal series of white dots edged with blackish terminally around the posterior part of the costa and termen. The hindwings are rather dark grey.
