= Helcystogramma badia =

Scientific classification
- Domain: Eukaryota
- Kingdom: Animalia
- Phylum: Arthropoda
- Class: Insecta
- Order: Lepidoptera
- Family: Gelechiidae
- Genus: Helcystogramma
- Species: H. badia

Binomial name
- Helcystogramma badia (Braun, 1921)

Synonyms
- Brachmia badia Braun, 1921; Helcystogramma badium

Species of moth

Helcystogramma badia is a moth in the family Gelechiidae. It was described by Annette Frances Braun in 1921. It is found in North America, where it has been recorded from California and Nevada to southern British Columbia and Utah.

The wingspan is about 16 mm. The forewings are ocherous, the scales in the outer half of the wing tipped with a slightly deeper more reddish color. There is a dark brown discal dot in the middle of the cell, and a larger slightly transverse spot at the end of the cell, as well as a dark brown plical spot a little anterior to the first discal. The hindwings are whitish. Adults have been recorded on wing in July and August.
