= Helcystogramma hassenzanensis =

Scientific classification
- Kingdom: Animalia
- Phylum: Arthropoda
- Clade: Pancrustacea
- Class: Insecta
- Order: Lepidoptera
- Family: Gelechiidae
- Genus: Helcystogramma
- Species: H. hassenzanensis

Binomial name
- Helcystogramma hassenzanensis Park & Hodges, 1995

Species of moth

Helcystogramma hassenzanensis is a species of moth in the family Gelechiidae. It was described by Kyu-Tek Park and Ronald W. Hodges in 1995. It is known from China (Jiangxi, Sichuan) and Taiwan.

== Description ==
The length of the forewings is 6–7.5 mm. The forewings are grey brown. The hindwings are grey.
