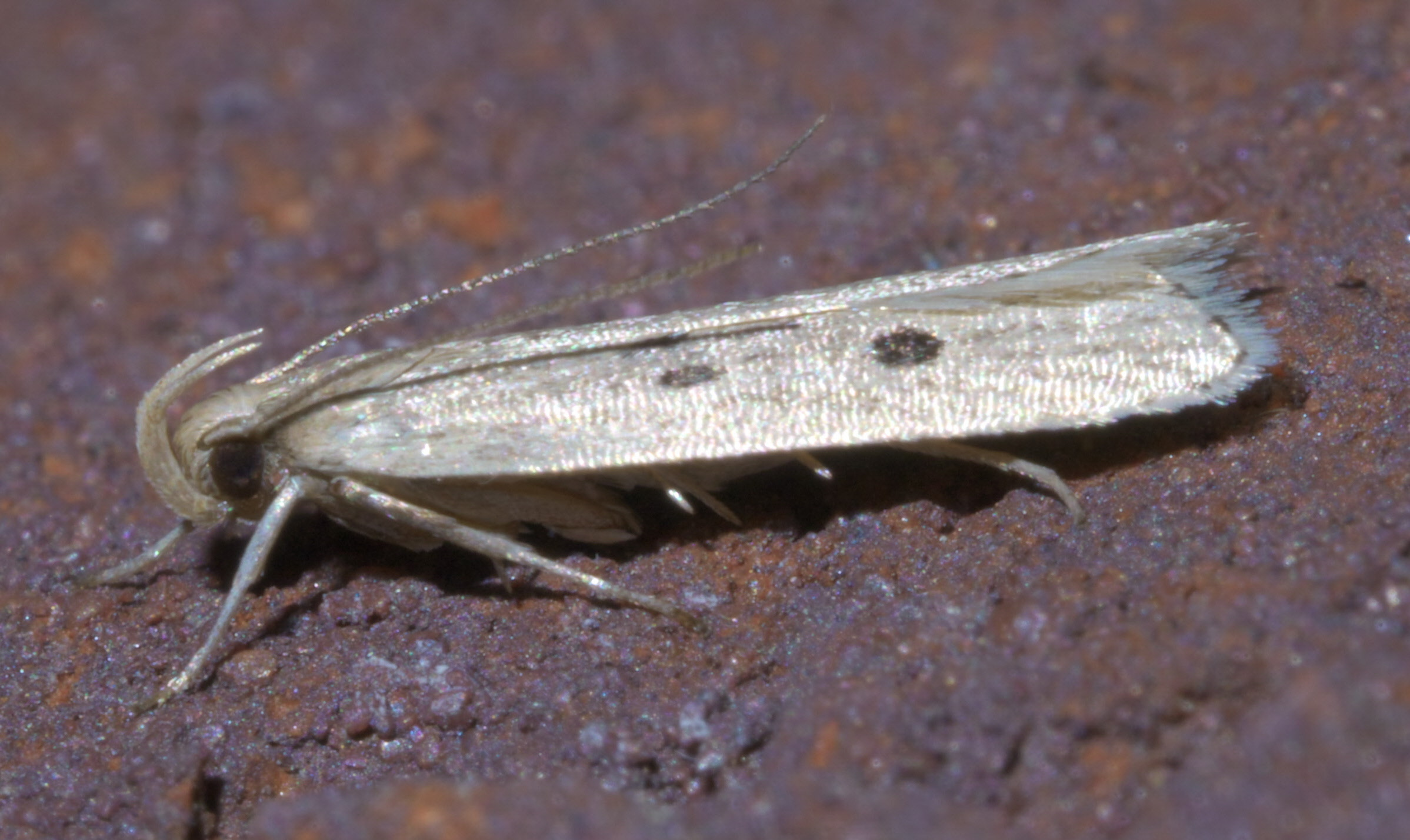

Scientific classification
- Kingdom: Animalia
- Phylum: Arthropoda
- Class: Insecta
- Order: Lepidoptera
- Family: Gelechiidae
- Genus: Helcystogramma
- Species: H. melanocarpa

Binomial name
- Helcystogramma melanocarpa (Meyrick, 1929)

Synonyms
- Brachmia melanocarpa Meyrick, 1929; Helcystogramma melanocarpum; Gelechia trimaculella Chambers, 1874 (preocc. Packard, 1867)

= Helcystogramma melanocarpa =

Species of moth

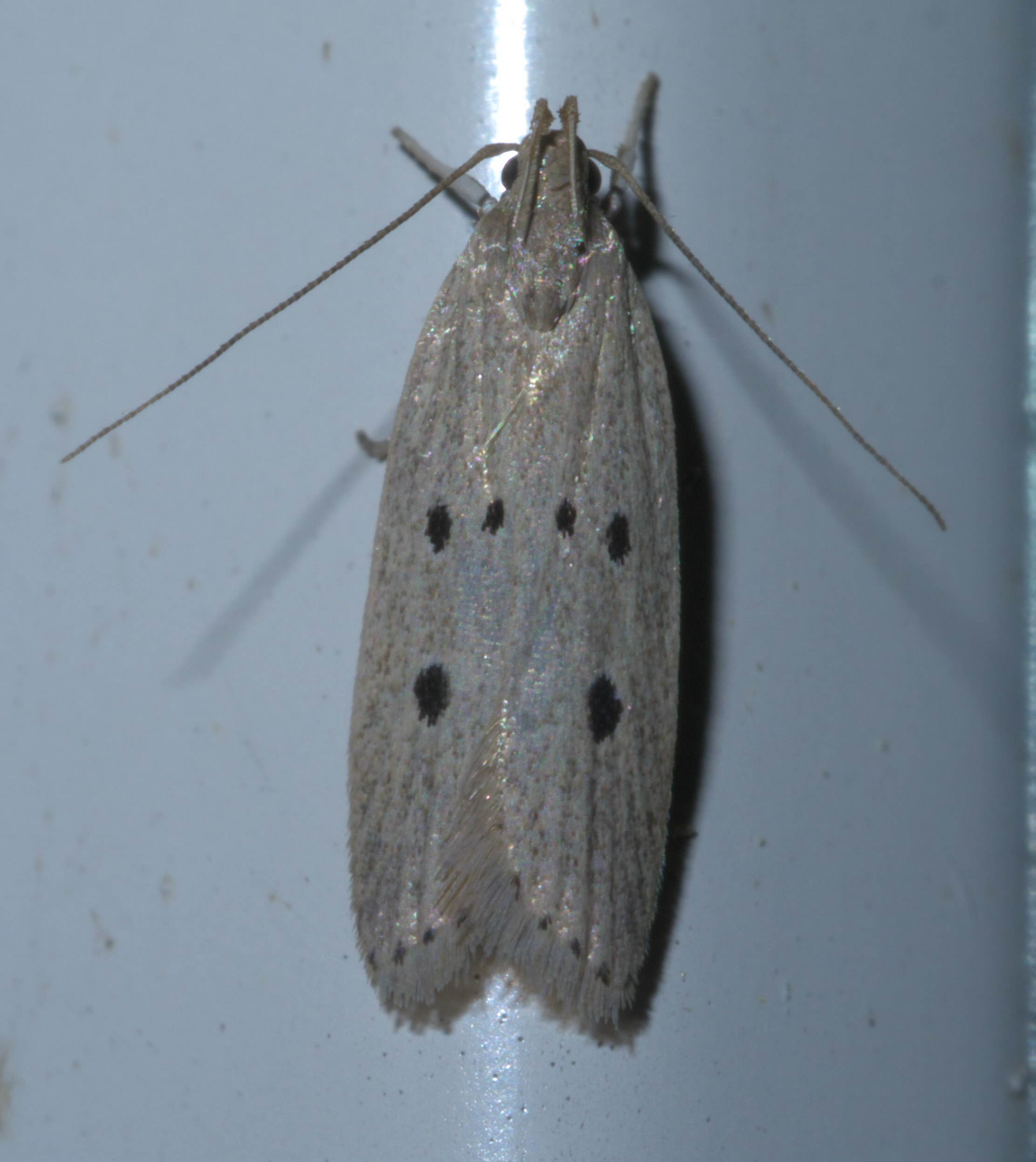

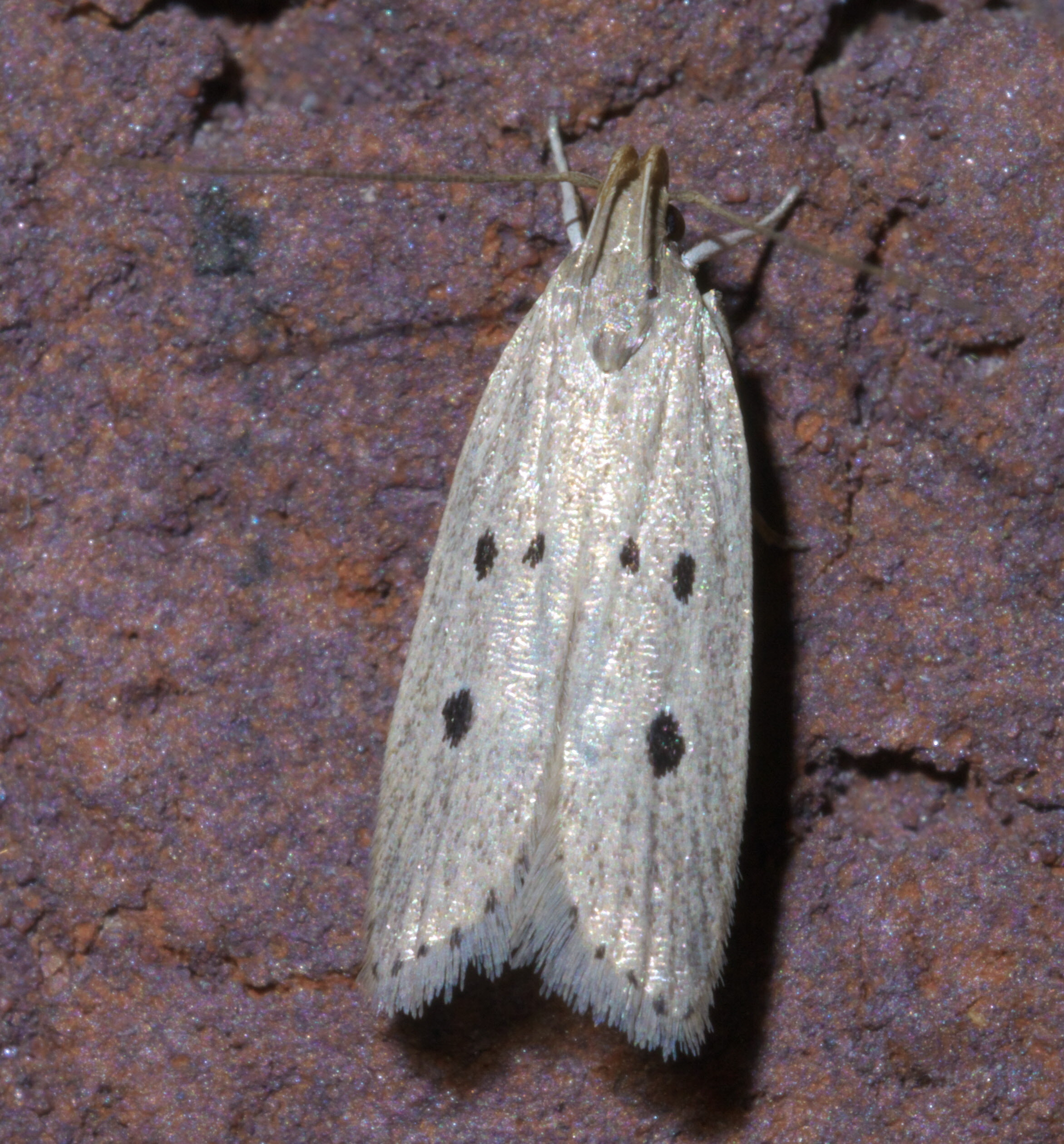

Helcystogramma melanocarpa is a moth in the family Gelechiidae. It was described by Edward Meyrick in 1929. It is found in North America, where it has been recorded from Nova Scotia to New Brunswick to South Carolina and to Texas.

The wingspan is about 11 mm. Adults are on wing from March to August.
