= Helcystogramma delocosma =

Scientific classification
- Kingdom: Animalia
- Phylum: Arthropoda
- Class: Insecta
- Order: Lepidoptera
- Family: Gelechiidae
- Genus: Helcystogramma
- Species: H. delocosma

Binomial name
- Helcystogramma delocosma (Meyrick, 1936)

Synonyms
- Onebala delocosma Meyrick, 1936

Species of moth

Helcystogramma delocosma is a moth in the family Gelechiidae. It was described by Edward Meyrick in 1936. It is known from Indonesia (Java).

The larvae feed on Micromelum pubescens.
