= Helcystogramma anthistis =

Scientific classification
- Kingdom: Animalia
- Phylum: Arthropoda
- Class: Insecta
- Order: Lepidoptera
- Family: Gelechiidae
- Genus: Helcystogramma
- Species: H. anthistis

Binomial name
- Helcystogramma anthistis (Meyrick, 1929)

Synonyms
- Tricyanaula anthistis Meyrick, 1929

Species of moth

Helcystogramma anthistis is a moth in the family Gelechiidae. It was described by Edward Meyrick in 1929. It is known from Sri Lanka.

The wingspan is about 8 mm.
