= Helcystogramma armatum =

Scientific classification
- Kingdom: Animalia
- Phylum: Arthropoda
- Class: Insecta
- Order: Lepidoptera
- Family: Gelechiidae
- Genus: Helcystogramma
- Species: H. armatum

Binomial name
- Helcystogramma armatum (Meyrick, 1911)

Synonyms
- Strobisia armata Meyrick, 1911; Onebala armata Meyrick, 1925

Species of moth

Helcystogramma armatum is a moth in the family Gelechiidae. It was described by Edward Meyrick in 1911. It is known from northeastern India.

The wingspan is 10–11 mm. The forewings are rather bright fulvous with bluish-leaden-metallic markings edged with blackish scales and with a streak from the base along the costa to one-third, thence obliquely across the wing to two-thirds of the dorsum, where it meets a slightly curved rather narrow fascia from three-fifths of the costa. There is a subdorsal streak from the base to two-fifths and a small white mark on the costa beyond the postmedian fascia. The posterior area beyond this fascia is wholly black, except for an irregular blue-leaden-metallic fascia close before the termen, leaving a fulvous black-edged terminal line. The hindwings are blackish fuscous.
