= Helcystogramma ceriochrantum =

Scientific classification
- Kingdom: Animalia
- Phylum: Arthropoda
- Class: Insecta
- Order: Lepidoptera
- Family: Gelechiidae
- Genus: Helcystogramma
- Species: H. ceriochrantum

Binomial name
- Helcystogramma ceriochrantum (Meyrick, 1939)

Synonyms
- Anathyrsotis ceriochranta Meyrick, 1939

Species of moth

Helcystogramma ceriochrantum is a moth in the family Gelechiidae. It is found in Sichuan, China.
