= Helcystogramma perceptella =

Scientific classification
- Domain: Eukaryota
- Kingdom: Animalia
- Phylum: Arthropoda
- Class: Insecta
- Order: Lepidoptera
- Family: Gelechiidae
- Genus: Helcystogramma
- Species: H. perceptella

Binomial name
- Helcystogramma perceptella (Busck, 1914)

Synonyms
- Dichomeris perceptella Busck, 1914

Species of moth

Helcystogramma perceptella is a moth in the family Gelechiidae. It was described by August Busck in 1914. It is found in Panama.

The wingspan is 14–15 mm. The forewings are blackish brown with a violet sheen and with three, large, conspicuous, reddish orange blotches occupying about half of the wing space. The first of these orange spots lies on the basal third of the costa and extends obliquely outward and downward over the cell beyond the fold, nearly, but not quite, to the dorsal edge, ending in a sharp point above the middle of the dorsum. The second ochreous spot lies on the apical third of the costa, is like the first, irregularly pentagonal, with a point toward but not reaching the dorsum and a sharp attenuated point toward the apex. The third smaller orange spot, on the costa, just before the apex is drop shaped and is continued as a submarginal yellow line along the termen and dorsum, ending between the two large orange spots. The hindwings are nearly black.
