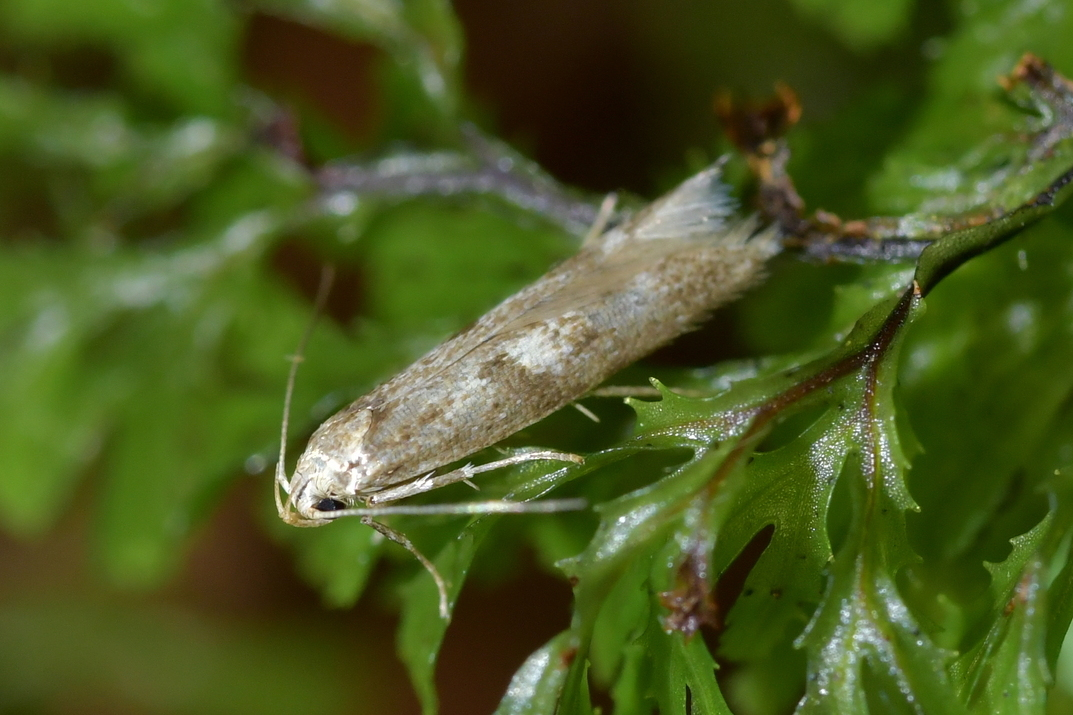

Scientific classification
- Kingdom: Animalia
- Phylum: Arthropoda
- Clade: Pancrustacea
- Class: Insecta
- Order: Lepidoptera
- Family: Gelechiidae
- Genus: Thiotricha
- Species: T. tetraphala

Binomial name
- Thiotricha tetraphala (Meyrick, 1885)

Synonyms
- Thistricha tetraphala Meyrick, 1885

= Thiotricha tetraphala =

Species of moth endemic to New Zealand

Thiotricha tetraphala, also known as the beech case moth, is a species of moth in the family Gelechiidae. It was first described by Edward Meyrick in 1885. It is endemic to New Zealand where it has been observed in the North and South Islands. T. tetraphala inhabits native forest including New Zealand beech forest. Larvae have been recorded as feeding on the leaves of Nothofagus fusca, Nothofagus menziesii, Lophomyrtus obcordata and Leptospermum scoparium. The larvae are case bearers. Pupation takes place within that case. Adults are on the wing from November until March.

== Taxonomy ==
This species was first described by Edward Meyrick in 1885 and originally named Thistricha tetraphala. In 1886 Meyrick placed this species in the genus Thiotricha and gave a fuller description of the species. In 1927 Alfred Philpott discussed and illustrated the male genitalia of this species. George Hudson discussed and illustrated this species under the name Thiotricha tetraphala in his 1928 book The butterflies and moths of New Zealand and again in his 1939 book A supplement to the butterflies and moths of New Zealand. In 1996 John S. Dugdale discussed and illustrated the larvae of this species. In 2021 a phylogenetic analysis was undertaken on species within the subfamily Thiotrichinae and the placement of T. tetraphala in the genus Thiotricha was confirmed. The male holotype, collected in Dunedin in February, is held at the Natural History Museum, London.

== Description ==
Live moth at rest.

Meyrick described the adult male of the species as follows:

Male. — 12 mm. Head, palpi, antennae, thorax, abdomen, and legs whitish-grey, somewhat shining; second joint of palpi dark grey , anterior legs dark grey. Forewings elongate, narrow, acutely pointed ; light grey, somewhat irrorated with grey-whitish in disc ; three dark grey spots ; first basal ; second triangular, in disc before middle ; third larger, oblong, beyond middle, resting on submedian fold : cilia grey-whitish, with a suffused interrupted grey line near base round apex. Hind-wings grey ; cilia whitish-grey.

Hudson described the larva of this species as follows:

The full-grown larva is about 1/4 inch in length, moderately stout, of fairly even thickness, slightly tapering towards posterior extremity; head reddish-brown; segment 2 with strong, dull brown, dorsal plate; rest of body dull greenishochreous, pinkish-tinged; a black anterior dorsal shade, indicating alimentary canal; five or six post thoracic segments broadly edged with dull pinkish-ochreous posteriorly; legs well developed greenish-ochreous; abdominal prolegs very small; anal proleg well developed.

=== Gallery of illustrations ===
Case made of beech leaves

Case made of L. obcordata leaves.

Larva

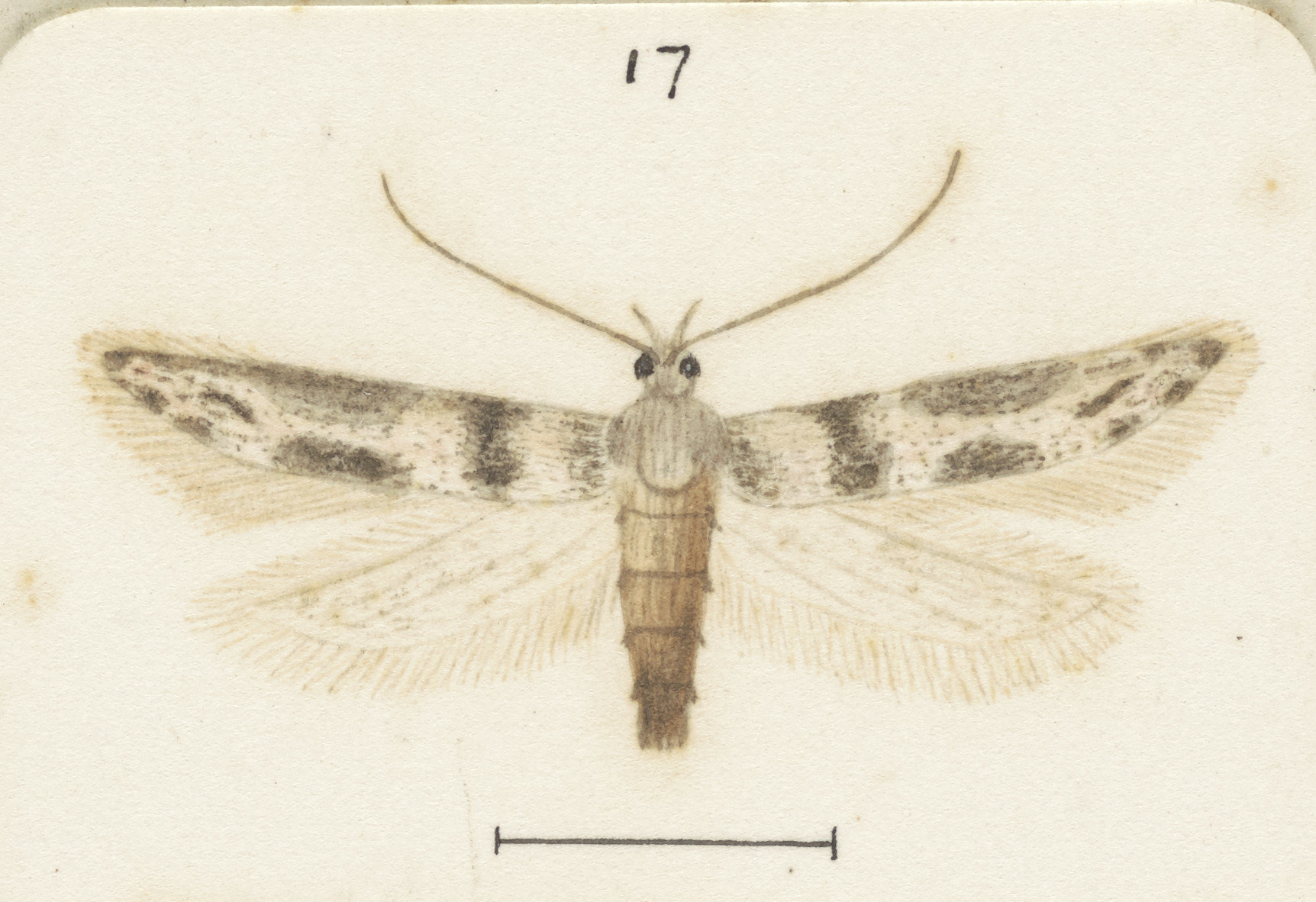
Adult

== Distribution ==
T. tetraphala is endemic to New Zealand. It has been observed in both the North and South Islands.

== Habitat and hosts ==
This species inhabits native forest including New Zealand beech forest. The larval host plants include the New Zealand beech species Nothofagus fusca and Nothofagus menziesii. Other larval hosts include Lophomyrtus obcordata and Leptospermum scoparium.

== Behaviour ==
The larva of this species is a case bearer and form the case by rolling leaf-pieces sourced from its host plant into a tube. It constructs its case by rolling flat leaves forming a tube shape at the bottom end portion of the case but the top end is much broader and is constructed with flat leaves joined together with silk. If the case is formed from beech leaves the top end broad portion is whitish-green and the cylindrical bottom end part is deep brown. When walking about half the body of the larva is projected from the case. Pupation takes place within that case, which the larva ties with silk to a leaf or twig of its host plant. Adults are on the wing from November until March.
