= Thiotricha cuneiformis =

Scientific classification
- Domain: Eukaryota
- Kingdom: Animalia
- Phylum: Arthropoda
- Class: Insecta
- Order: Lepidoptera
- Family: Gelechiidae
- Genus: Thiotricha
- Species: T. cuneiformis

Binomial name
- Thiotricha cuneiformis Meyrick, 1918

Species of moth

Thiotricha cuneiformis is a moth of the family Gelechiidae. It was described by Edward Meyrick in 1918. It is found in Kodagu district in southern India.

The wingspan is 9–11 mm. The forewings are shining white with the costal edge black from the base to a slight mark before the middle. There is an elongate dark fuscous spot on the dorsum before the middle and an oblique wedge-shaped black mark on the costa at about three-fourths, closely followed by a black strigula, from the apex of these a fine black line runs to the tornus, acutely indented on the fold and there is a black apical dot with a dark fuscous dot adjacent beneath. The hindwings are grey, paler in the disc anteriorly.
