= Thiotricha obvoluta =

Scientific classification
- Kingdom: Animalia
- Phylum: Arthropoda
- Class: Insecta
- Order: Lepidoptera
- Family: Gelechiidae
- Genus: Thiotricha
- Species: T. obvoluta

Binomial name
- Thiotricha obvoluta Meyrick, 1918

Species of moth

Thiotricha obvoluta is a moth of the family Gelechiidae. It was described by Edward Meyrick in 1918. It is found in Assam, India.

The wingspan measures approximately 11 mm. The forewings are fuscous, featuring an elongated dark fuscous patch that extends along the dorsum from the base to near the tornus. The upper edge has an oblique-triangular prominence before the middle of the wing, edged with a lighter suffusion both before and beyond this area. A slender dark fuscous longitudinal streak is present in the disc posteriorly, partially edged with a pale color beneath. Additionally, there is an oblique whitish strigula from the costa at four-fifths, along with traces of a fine leaden-metallic transverse line beyond it. Three whitish dots are separated by dark fuscous on the costa towards the apex, with the last one edging a black apical dot. The hindwings are dark grey.
