= Thiotricha animosella =

Scientific classification
- Kingdom: Animalia
- Phylum: Arthropoda
- Class: Insecta
- Order: Lepidoptera
- Family: Gelechiidae
- Genus: Thiotricha
- Species: T. animosella

Binomial name
- Thiotricha animosella (Walker, 1864)

Synonyms
- Gelechia animosella Walker, 1864; Thiotricha acrocelea Turner, 1919

Species of moth

Thiotricha animosella is a moth of the family Gelechiidae. It was described by Francis Walker in 1864. It is found in southern India, Sri Lanka and Australia, where it has been recorded from Queensland.

The wingspan is about 9 mm. The forewings are shining-white with the apical fourth bright orange from the costa to the termen. A suffused grey dorsal spot precedes the orange area and there is a black spot at the apex and a black dot on the termen above the middle, preceded by a white dot. The hindwings are pale grey, with the apical process ochreous tinged towards the extremities and a black dot on the extreme apex.
