= Thiotricha syncentritis =

Scientific classification
- Domain: Eukaryota
- Kingdom: Animalia
- Phylum: Arthropoda
- Class: Insecta
- Order: Lepidoptera
- Family: Gelechiidae
- Genus: Thiotricha
- Species: T. syncentritis

Binomial name
- Thiotricha syncentritis Meyrick, 1935

Species of moth

Thiotricha syncentritis is a moth of the family Gelechiidae. It was described by Edward Meyrick in 1935. It is found on Java in Indonesia.

The larvae feed in the shoots of Terminalia javanica.
