= Thiotricha hamulata =

Scientific classification
- Domain: Eukaryota
- Kingdom: Animalia
- Phylum: Arthropoda
- Class: Insecta
- Order: Lepidoptera
- Family: Gelechiidae
- Genus: Thiotricha
- Species: T. hamulata

Binomial name
- Thiotricha hamulata Meyrick, 1921

Species of moth

Thiotricha hamulata is a moth of the family Gelechiidae. It was described by Edward Meyrick in 1921. It is found on Java in Indonesia.

The wingspan is about 14 mm. The forewings are shining white with the costal edge dark fuscous towards the base and with a slight elongate dark fuscous mark on the dorsum at one-fourth. There is a slender very oblique dark fuscous streak from the middle of the dorsum, reaching nearly halfway across the wing and a small cloudy fuscous spot on the dorsum before the tornus, as well as a very oblique wedge-shaped dark fuscous mark from the costa towards the apex and a small irregular black apical spot. The hindwings are grey whitish.
