= Palumbina pylartis =

Scientific classification
- Domain: Eukaryota
- Kingdom: Animalia
- Phylum: Arthropoda
- Class: Insecta
- Order: Lepidoptera
- Family: Gelechiidae
- Genus: Palumbina
- Species: P. pylartis

Binomial name
- Palumbina pylartis (Meyrick, 1908)

Synonyms
- Thiotricha pylartis Meyrick, 1908

Species of moth

Palumbina pylartis is a moth of the family Gelechiidae. It was described by Edward Meyrick in 1908. It is found in Assam, India.

The wingspan is 11–13 mm. The forewings are ochreous whitish, with the markings dark slaty grey. There is a slender basal fascia, sometimes interrupted and there are two irregular zigzag sometimes interrupted lines from the costa at one-sixth and two-fifths, confluent towards the dorsum. Inwardly oblique fasciae are found at the middle and three-fourths, the first narrow, the second broader, sometimes not reaching the dorsum and often connected by a line in the disc. There is also a small spot or bar just before the apex. The hindwings are light grey, darker in females, thinly scaled towards the base.
