= Thiotricha orthiastis =

Scientific classification
- Domain: Eukaryota
- Kingdom: Animalia
- Phylum: Arthropoda
- Class: Insecta
- Order: Lepidoptera
- Family: Gelechiidae
- Genus: Thiotricha
- Species: T. orthiastis

Binomial name
- Thiotricha orthiastis Meyrick, 1905

Species of moth

Thiotricha orthiastis is a moth of the family Gelechiidae. It was described by Edward Meyrick in 1905. It is found in the Punjab region of what was British India.

The wingspan is about 13 mm. The forewings are dark fuscous with a broad ochreous-white streak occupying the costal half from the base, from the middle onwards gradually attenuated and leaving the costal edge, not quite reaching the apex. There is a fine white strigula between this and the apical fifth of the costa and there is a black apical mark. The hindwings are grey, darker posteriorly.
