= Thiotricha chrysopa =

Scientific classification
- Domain: Eukaryota
- Kingdom: Animalia
- Phylum: Arthropoda
- Class: Insecta
- Order: Lepidoptera
- Family: Gelechiidae
- Genus: Thiotricha
- Species: T. chrysopa

Binomial name
- Thiotricha chrysopa Meyrick, 1904

Species of moth

Thiotricha chrysopa is a moth of the family Gelechiidae. It was described by Edward Meyrick in 1904. It is found in Australia, where it has been recorded from Queensland.

The wingspan is about 10 mm (0.39 in). The forewings are shining pale grey, with brassy and purplish reflections and there is a pale ochreous-yellow patch occupying the apical fourth of the wing, the upper half suffused with orange, the anterior edge convex, enclosing a longitudinal dark grey median dash. There is also a black apical dot, connected with a dark grey mark along the upper part of the termen. The hindwings are grey.
