= Thiotricha glenias =

Scientific classification
- Domain: Eukaryota
- Kingdom: Animalia
- Phylum: Arthropoda
- Class: Insecta
- Order: Lepidoptera
- Family: Gelechiidae
- Genus: Thiotricha
- Species: T. glenias

Binomial name
- Thiotricha glenias Meyrick, 1908

Species of moth

Thiotricha glenias is a moth of the family Gelechiidae. It was described by Edward Meyrick in 1908. It is found in Sri Lanka.

The wingspan is 8–10 mm. The forewings are silvery white, more or less tinged with ochreous and with the apical two-fifths orange ochreous anteriorly suffused. There is a grey mark from the dorsum before the tornus, angulated inwards near the dorsum, then outwardly oblique, reaching more than halfway across the wing, a round black dot at the apex, and another on the termen, each preceded by a whitish dot. The hindwings are whitish grey, thinly scaled, the apex tinged with orange and with a blackish apical dot.
