= Thiotricha niphastis =

Scientific classification
- Domain: Eukaryota
- Kingdom: Animalia
- Phylum: Arthropoda
- Class: Insecta
- Order: Lepidoptera
- Family: Gelechiidae
- Genus: Thiotricha
- Species: T. niphastis

Binomial name
- Thiotricha niphastis Meyrick, 1904

Species of moth

Thiotricha niphastis is a moth of the family Gelechiidae. It was described by Edward Meyrick in 1904. It is found in Australia, where it has been recorded from Western Australia.

The wingspan is about 11 mm (0.43 in). The forewings are shining whitish, sprinkled with fuscous and a triangular fuscous spot on the base of the costa. The anterior half of the dorsum is suffused with pale grey. There is an irregular fuscous spot in the disc at one-fourth, one beneath the middle of the disc, one on tornus, and one on costa at two-thirds. There is some irregular fuscous marking towards the apex and a blackish apical dot. The hindwings are light grey.
