= Thiotricha acrantha =

Scientific classification
- Domain: Eukaryota
- Kingdom: Animalia
- Phylum: Arthropoda
- Class: Insecta
- Order: Lepidoptera
- Family: Gelechiidae
- Genus: Thiotricha
- Species: T. acrantha

Binomial name
- Thiotricha acrantha Meyrick, 1908

Species of moth

Thiotricha acrantha is a moth of the family Gelechiidae. It was described by Edward Meyrick in 1908. It is found in Assam, India.

The wingspan is about 10 mm. The forewings are shining ochreous whitish with an acutely angulated whitish line from four-fifths of the costa to the tornus, edged anteriorly on the upper half by a blackish streak, elsewhere indistinctly with fuscous, the angle nearly reaching the apex. The apex is faintly rosy tinged and there are small blackish dots at the apex and on the termen towards the apex. The hindwings are light grey, thinly scaled towards the base and with a dark grey apical dot.
