= Thiotricha xanthodora =

Scientific classification
- Domain: Eukaryota
- Kingdom: Animalia
- Phylum: Arthropoda
- Class: Insecta
- Order: Lepidoptera
- Family: Gelechiidae
- Genus: Thiotricha
- Species: T. xanthodora

Binomial name
- Thiotricha xanthodora Meyrick, 1923

Species of moth

Thiotricha xanthodora is a moth of the family Gelechiidae. It was described by Edward Meyrick in 1923. It is found in Myanmar.

The wingspan is about 8 mm. The forewings are light ochreous yellowish with subcostal, median, and dorsal streaks from the base to about one-third. There is a similar streak along the posterior part of the fold and an ochreous-orange blotch extending along the costa from three-fifths to near the apex, in the middle with a projection meeting a small spot on the tornus. The hindwings are rather dark fuscous.
