= Thiotricha pteropis =

Scientific classification
- Domain: Eukaryota
- Kingdom: Animalia
- Phylum: Arthropoda
- Class: Insecta
- Order: Lepidoptera
- Family: Gelechiidae
- Genus: Thiotricha
- Species: T. pteropis

Binomial name
- Thiotricha pteropis Meyrick, 1908

Species of moth

Thiotricha pteropis is a moth of the family Gelechiidae. It was described by Edward Meyrick in 1908. It is found in Sri Lanka and Assam, India.

The wingspan is 8–10 mm. The forewings are ochreous white or whitish ochreous with an elongate rounded-triangular leaden-grey spot finely edged with blackish extending along the termen from the tornus to the apex, broadest anteriorly. There is an oblique blackish line from three-fourths of the costa running into this before the apex, as well as a small triangular ochreous-brown costal mark before the apex, meeting the apex of the terminal spot. There is also a round black apical dot. The hindwings are grey.
