= Palumbina chelophora =

Scientific classification
- Domain: Eukaryota
- Kingdom: Animalia
- Phylum: Arthropoda
- Class: Insecta
- Order: Lepidoptera
- Family: Gelechiidae
- Genus: Palumbina
- Species: P. chelophora

Binomial name
- Palumbina chelophora (Meyrick, 1918)

Synonyms
- Thyrsostoma chelophora Meyrick, 1918

Species of moth

Palumbina chelophora is a moth of the family Gelechiidae. It was described by Edward Meyrick in 1918. It is found in Assam, India.

The wingspan is 12–13 mm. The forewings are dark fuscous, faintly violet tinged and with an inwardly-oblique white fascia at two-fifths, rather broad on the costa and narrowed downwards, sometimes extended as a slender streak on the dorsum to near the base. There is an elongate-triangular white blotch in the disc beyond the middle, the upper edge almost reaching the costa throughout and a small cloudy pale fuscous or whitish spot near the apex. The hindwings are rather dark grey.
