= Thiotricha obliquata =

Scientific classification
- Kingdom: Animalia
- Phylum: Arthropoda
- Clade: Pancrustacea
- Class: Insecta
- Order: Lepidoptera
- Family: Gelechiidae
- Genus: Thiotricha
- Species: T. obliquata

Binomial name
- Thiotricha obliquata (Matsumura, 1931)

Synonyms
- Oegoconiodes obliquata Matsumura, 1931; Polyhymno iphimacha Meyrick, 1933

Species of moth

Thiotricha obliquata is a moth of the family Gelechiidae. It was described by Shōnen Matsumura in 1931. It is found in Japan and Russia.
