= Thiotricha godmani =

Scientific classification
- Domain: Eukaryota
- Kingdom: Animalia
- Phylum: Arthropoda
- Class: Insecta
- Order: Lepidoptera
- Family: Gelechiidae
- Genus: Thiotricha
- Species: T. godmani

Binomial name
- Thiotricha godmani (Walsingham, [1892])

Synonyms
- Polyhymno godmani Walsingham, [1892]

Species of moth

Thiotricha godmani is a moth belonging to the family Gelechiidae. It was first described by Thomas de Grey in 1892. This species is primarily found in the West Indies.

The wingspan of Thiotricha godmani measures approximately 11 mm. The forewings are characterized by a shining pale reddish-grey colour, lacking any markings beyond the middle portion. Towards the apical region of the wing, there is a notable feature—a bright orange-yellow streak that starts slightly above the middle of the wing and extends to the costal margin before reaching a small jet-black apical spot. From this spot, two slender dark lines diverge downwards towards the anal angle. These lines are believed to be a result of the iridescent effect created by waved lines of scales, rather than being formed by dark scaling. Preceding the dark lines, there is a bright silvery-white space that runs obliquely backward, which also appears to be dark-margined. The forewings are further adorned by shining lilac metallic cilia, which gather into two distinct depressed points at the apex, giving the wing a falcate appearance. The hindwings, on the other hand, exhibit a shining pale grey color.
