= Palumbina diplobathra =

Scientific classification
- Domain: Eukaryota
- Kingdom: Animalia
- Phylum: Arthropoda
- Class: Insecta
- Order: Lepidoptera
- Family: Gelechiidae
- Genus: Palumbina
- Species: P. diplobathra

Binomial name
- Palumbina diplobathra (Meyrick, 1918)

Synonyms
- Thyrsostoma diplobathra Meyrick, 1918

Species of moth

Palumbina diplobathra is a moth of the family Gelechiidae. It was described by Edward Meyrick in 1918. It is found in Assam, India.

The wingspan is 10–11 mm. The forewings are grey with strong violet-blue reflections and white markings. There is a narrow inwardly oblique fascia at one-third and a subtriangular spot in the disc at two-thirds, as well as a spot crossing the wing near the apex. The hindwings are grey.
