= Thiotricha pontifera =

Scientific classification
- Domain: Eukaryota
- Kingdom: Animalia
- Phylum: Arthropoda
- Class: Insecta
- Order: Lepidoptera
- Family: Gelechiidae
- Genus: Thiotricha
- Species: T. pontifera

Binomial name
- Thiotricha pontifera Meyrick, 1934

Synonyms
- Polyhymno pontifera

Species of moth

Thiotricha pontifera is a moth of the family Gelechiidae. It was described by Edward Meyrick in 1934. It is found in Korea, Japan and Russia.
