= Thiotricha scotaea =

Scientific classification
- Domain: Eukaryota
- Kingdom: Animalia
- Phylum: Arthropoda
- Class: Insecta
- Order: Lepidoptera
- Family: Gelechiidae
- Genus: Thiotricha
- Species: T. scotaea

Binomial name
- Thiotricha scotaea Meyrick, 1908

Species of moth

Thiotricha scotaea is a moth of the family Gelechiidae. It was described by Edward Meyrick in 1908. It is found in Sri Lanka.

The wingspan is about 13 mm. The forewings are rather dark purplish fuscous with an oblique fuscous-whitish mark towards the apex and two minute whitish dots on the costa near the apex. There is a blackish apical dot, edged posteriorly with a few whitish scales. The hindwings are rather dark grey, thinly scaled in the disc.
