= Thiotricha pyrphora =

Scientific classification
- Domain: Eukaryota
- Kingdom: Animalia
- Phylum: Arthropoda
- Class: Insecta
- Order: Lepidoptera
- Family: Gelechiidae
- Genus: Thiotricha
- Species: T. pyrphora

Binomial name
- Thiotricha pyrphora Meyrick, 1918

Species of moth

Thiotricha pyrphora is a moth of the family Gelechiidae. It was described by Edward Meyrick in 1918. It is found in southern India.

The wingspan is 7–8 mm. The forewings are grey, the basal half suffused with shining whitish. There is a deep orange blotch occupying the apical third, the anterior edge indented below the middle by a projection of ground colour sometimes (in males) extended as a streak to the apical spots, or with a spot of grey suffusion on the termen (in females). There is a round black spot at the apex (smaller in females), and a dot beneath it. The hindwings are grey, towards the apex suffused with orange before a dark grey pre-apical bar and with a black apical dot.
