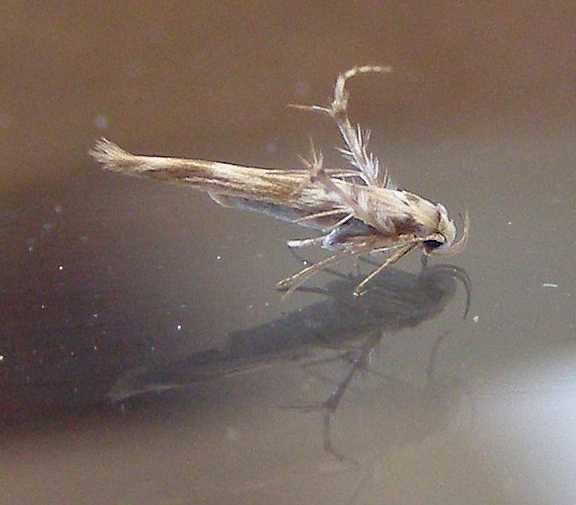

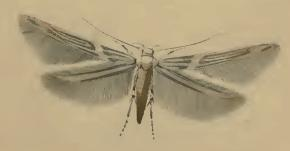

Scientific classification
- Kingdom: Animalia
- Phylum: Arthropoda
- Clade: Pancrustacea
- Class: Insecta
- Order: Lepidoptera
- Family: Gelechiidae
- Genus: Palumbina
- Species: P. guerinii

Binomial name
- Palumbina guerinii (Stainton, 1858)

Synonyms
- Stathmopoda guerinii Stainton, 1858; Thyrsostoma guerinii; Palumbina terebintella Rondani, 1876; Tinea pistaciae Anagnostopoulos, 1935

= Palumbina guerinii =

Species of moth

Palumbina guerinii is a moth of the family Gelechiidae. It is found in southern Europe, from the Iberian Peninsula north to France, east to Italy and Greece.

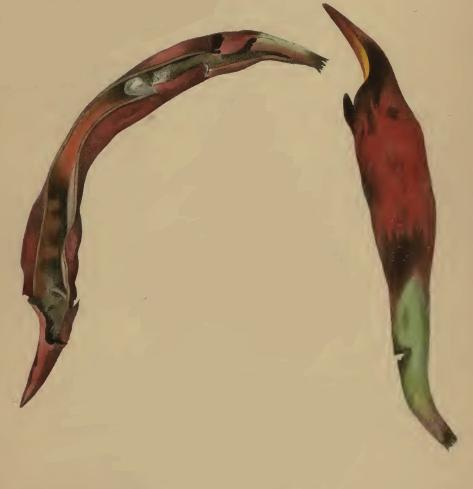
Pod-like galls formed by aphids on twigs of Pistacia terebinthus and inhabited by the larvae

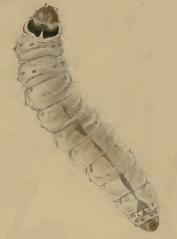
Larva

The wingspan is about 11 mm. The forewings are pale olive grey, a little darker posteriorly. Before the middle is an oblique whitish fascia, nearest the base of the wing on the inner margin, the whitish colour of this fascia runs along the edge of the costa and inner margin to the middle of the wing. Beyond the middle is a whitish blotch not reaching to the costa, and intersected by two dark olive-grey veins. The apex of the wing is whitish, streaked with grey. The hindwings are pale grey.

It is considered a pest on pistachio trees.
