= Thiotricha hemiphaea =

Scientific classification
- Domain: Eukaryota
- Kingdom: Animalia
- Phylum: Arthropoda
- Class: Insecta
- Order: Lepidoptera
- Family: Gelechiidae
- Genus: Thiotricha
- Species: T. hemiphaea

Binomial name
- Thiotricha hemiphaea Turner, 1919

Species of moth

Thiotricha hemiphaea is a moth of the family Gelechiidae. It was described by Alfred Jefferis Turner in 1919. It is found in Australia, where it has been recorded from Queensland.

The wingspan is about 10 mm. The forewings are grey, towards the base suffused with silvery white except for a long dorsal wedge, broadest at the base. There is a white costal dot at five-sixths and black dots on the apex and mid-termen, edged anteriorly with white. The hindwings are grey with an apical fuscous dot.
