= Thiotricha leucothona =

Scientific classification
- Domain: Eukaryota
- Kingdom: Animalia
- Phylum: Arthropoda
- Class: Insecta
- Order: Lepidoptera
- Family: Gelechiidae
- Genus: Thiotricha
- Species: T. leucothona

Binomial name
- Thiotricha leucothona Meyrick, 1904

Species of moth

Thiotricha leucothona is a moth of the family Gelechiidae. It was described by Edward Meyrick in 1904. It is found in Australia, where it has been recorded from New South Wales.

The wingspan is 9–11 mm (0.35–0.43 in). The forewings are shining white, with a faint ochreous tinge and with the costal edge dark fuscous towards the base. There is a crescentic wedge-shaped fuscous tornal mark reaching halfway across the wing and there are two rather suffused dark fuscous oblique streaks from the costa towards the apex. There is also a black apical dot, preceded by some fuscous suffusion. The hindwings are light grey.
