= Thiotricha complicata =

Scientific classification
- Domain: Eukaryota
- Kingdom: Animalia
- Phylum: Arthropoda
- Class: Insecta
- Order: Lepidoptera
- Family: Gelechiidae
- Genus: Thiotricha
- Species: T. complicata

Binomial name
- Thiotricha complicata Meyrick, 1918

Species of moth

Thiotricha complicata is a moth of the family Gelechiidae. It was described by Edward Meyrick in 1918. It is found in southern India and Australia, where it has been recorded from Queensland.

The wingspan is about 8 mm. The forewings are rather dark glossy purplish grey with an oblique white line, suffused in the disc with yellow, from above the tornus to the apical portion of the costa, on which it is trifurcate, and a whitish line between this and the termen. There are cloudy thick dots at the apex and on the termen near the apex. The hindwings are grey.
