= Palumbina triphona =

Scientific classification
- Domain: Eukaryota
- Kingdom: Animalia
- Phylum: Arthropoda
- Class: Insecta
- Order: Lepidoptera
- Family: Gelechiidae
- Genus: Palumbina
- Species: P. triphona

Binomial name
- Palumbina triphona (Meyrick, 1927)

Synonyms
- Thyrsostoma triphona Meyrick, 1927

Species of moth

Palumbina triphona is a moth of the family Gelechiidae. It was described by Edward Meyrick in 1927. It is found on Samoa.
