= Thiotricha pancratiastis =

Scientific classification
- Domain: Eukaryota
- Kingdom: Animalia
- Phylum: Arthropoda
- Class: Insecta
- Order: Lepidoptera
- Family: Gelechiidae
- Genus: Thiotricha
- Species: T. pancratiastis

Binomial name
- Thiotricha pancratiastis Meyrick, 1921

Species of moth

Thiotricha pancratiastis is a moth of the family Gelechiidae. It was described by Edward Meyrick in 1921. It is found in Japan and Assam, India.

The wingspan is about 10 mm. The forewings are white with dark fuscous markings. There is a line along the basal fourth of the costa, terminating in an irregular-edged blotch occupying the costal half of the wing to three-fourths, containing a very oblique white striga from the middle of the costa and a longitudinal white striga beneath it, and terminated by an oblique white dark-edged line from three-fourths of the costa to the middle of the termen, becoming pale metallic blue on the discal third and broken inwards beneath it. There is a subcostal line from the base almost reaching the costal blotch, one beneath this nearly from the base and one from the base above the fold, both running into the costal blotch. There are two oblique-triangular spots from the basal portion of the dorsum reaching the fold and there is a somewhat upcurved line from the middle of the dorsum to the tornus. A gradually attenuated streak is found from the middle of the fold to the blue discal portion of the posterior line and there is a short line along the apical portion of the fold, and an arrowhead above it terminated by the posterior line. The apical area beyond the posterior line is tawny fuscous on the costa with three very short whitish marks before the apex, the last limiting a round black apical dot preceded by a pale metallic-blue dot. The hindwings are grey with a blackish apical dot surrounded by whitish suffusion.
