= Thiotricha galenaea =

Scientific classification
- Domain: Eukaryota
- Kingdom: Animalia
- Phylum: Arthropoda
- Class: Insecta
- Order: Lepidoptera
- Family: Gelechiidae
- Genus: Thiotricha
- Species: T. galenaea

Binomial name
- Thiotricha galenaea Meyrick, 1908

Species of moth

Thiotricha galenaea is a moth of the family Gelechiidae. It was described by Edward Meyrick in 1908. It is found in Sri Lanka.

The wingspan is about 16 mm. The forewings are shining ochreous white with an indistinct grey very acutely angulated transverse line about three-fourths, not reaching either margin. There is some grey suffusion towards the termen and a white almost marginal line along the posterior part of the costa and termen, at the apex preceded by an orange dot and followed by a black dot, where a blackish line proceeds along the upper part of the termen. The hindwings are whitish grey, towards the apex whitish ochreous and with a blackish apical dot.
