= Thiotricha attenuata =

Scientific classification
- Domain: Eukaryota
- Kingdom: Animalia
- Phylum: Arthropoda
- Class: Insecta
- Order: Lepidoptera
- Family: Gelechiidae
- Genus: Thiotricha
- Species: T. attenuata

Binomial name
- Thiotricha attenuata M. Omelko, 1993

Species of moth

Thiotricha attenuata is a moth of the family Gelechiidae. It was described by Mikhail Mikhailovich Omelko in 1993. It is found in Japan.

The wingspan is about 12 mm.
