= Thiotricha saulotis =

Scientific classification
- Domain: Eukaryota
- Kingdom: Animalia
- Phylum: Arthropoda
- Class: Insecta
- Order: Lepidoptera
- Family: Gelechiidae
- Genus: Thiotricha
- Species: T. saulotis

Binomial name
- Thiotricha saulotis Meyrick, 1906

Species of moth

Thiotricha saulotis is a moth of the family Gelechiidae. It was described by Edward Meyrick in 1906. It is found in Sri Lanka.

The wingspan is about 11 mm. The forewings are shining white with an orange-ochreous spot towards the apex, connected by two indistinct oblique grey strigulae with the costa, beneath with two longer similar strigulae, the first reaching the fold and angulated on it to the margin, the second limited below by a yellowish mark. There is a blackish apical dot, more strongly marked on the under surface. The hindwings are pale grey with a minute blackish apical dot.
