= Thiotricha grammitis =

Scientific classification
- Domain: Eukaryota
- Kingdom: Animalia
- Phylum: Arthropoda
- Class: Insecta
- Order: Lepidoptera
- Family: Gelechiidae
- Genus: Thiotricha
- Species: T. grammitis

Binomial name
- Thiotricha grammitis Meyrick, 1908

Species of moth

Thiotricha grammitis is a moth of the family Gelechiidae. It was described by Edward Meyrick in 1908. It is found in Assam, India.

The wingspan is 10–11 mm. The forewings are pale whitish ochreous with an elongate black dot beneath the costa near the base and sometimes a dark fuscous dot beneath the costa at one-fifth. There is a short inwardly oblique blackish mark from the costa at two-fifths and the disc and dorsum are obscurely streaked with fuscous suffusion. There is a dark fuscous dot above the dorsum at one-third and an oblique dark fuscous mark from the dorsum at two-thirds, both sometimes almost obsolete. Four longitudinal dark fuscous lines are found on the posterior half of the wing, the first and third converging to near the apex, the second terminating at three-fourths, the fourth running to the tornus, between the third and fourth, there is an acutely inwards angulated line running from the termen to three-fourths and back to the termen. A silvery spot is found on the termen beneath the apex. The hindwings are grey, thinly scaled towards the base.
