= Thiotricha lindsayi =

Scientific classification
- Kingdom: Animalia
- Phylum: Arthropoda
- Clade: Pancrustacea
- Class: Insecta
- Order: Lepidoptera
- Family: Gelechiidae
- Genus: Thiotricha
- Species: T. lindsayi

Binomial name
- Thiotricha lindsayi Philpott, 1927

Species of moth

Thiotricha lindsayi is a moth of the family Gelechiidae. It was described by Philpott in 1927. It is found in New Zealand.

The wingspan is about 15 mm. The forewings are purplish-brown with a sprinkling of whitish scales, especially on the posterior half. The hindwings are fuscous.

Larvae cause beech defoliation.
