= Thiotricha hoplomacha =

Scientific classification
- Domain: Eukaryota
- Kingdom: Animalia
- Phylum: Arthropoda
- Class: Insecta
- Order: Lepidoptera
- Family: Gelechiidae
- Genus: Thiotricha
- Species: T. hoplomacha

Binomial name
- Thiotricha hoplomacha Meyrick, 1908

Species of moth

Thiotricha hoplomacha is a moth of the family Gelechiidae. It was described by Edward Meyrick in 1908. It is found in Assam, India.

The wingspan is about 15 mm. The forewings are whitish ochreous, with blackish-fuscous markings. There is a thick streak along the costa from the base, attenuated and becoming subcostal towards the middle, continued to the apex. There is also a very oblique streak from the costa about three-fourths, running into this and a very oblique curved wedge-shaped streak from the dorsum towards the base, not crossing the fold. A thick oblique streak is found from the dorsum about the middle, running into the subcostal streak, dilated on the dorsum. There is also a streak from the tornus before the termen to the apex, finely attenuated upwards. Finally, there is a blackish pale-edged apical dot. The hindwings are pale whitish grey.
