= Thiotricha sciurella =

Scientific classification
- Domain: Eukaryota
- Kingdom: Animalia
- Phylum: Arthropoda
- Class: Insecta
- Order: Lepidoptera
- Family: Gelechiidae
- Genus: Thiotricha
- Species: T. sciurella

Binomial name
- Thiotricha sciurella (Walsingham, 1897)

Synonyms
- Polyhymno sciurella Walsingham, 1897; Thiotricha argoxantha Meyrick, 1914

Species of moth

Thiotricha sciurella is a moth of the family Gelechiidae. It was described by Thomas de Grey in 1897. It is found on the West Indies and from Mexico to Brazil.

The wingspan is about 8 mm. The forewings are shining bluish white, with an elongate bright orange patch preceding the apex and reaching the costa but not the dorsum. This is preceded by a slight greyish shade, which does not extend along its upper edge and is followed by a strong black apical spot. Before and below the spot is an outwardly curved greyish shade, partly enclosing an elongate silver-white oblique streak along the tornus. Alternate orange and greyish-fuscous lines diverge downwards from the apex through the upper half of the cilia, which are plain greyish white about the tornus. The hindwings are pale blue-grey.
