= Thiotricha rhodopa =

Scientific classification
- Domain: Eukaryota
- Kingdom: Animalia
- Phylum: Arthropoda
- Class: Insecta
- Order: Lepidoptera
- Family: Gelechiidae
- Genus: Thiotricha
- Species: T. rhodopa

Binomial name
- Thiotricha rhodopa Meyrick, 1908

Species of moth

Thiotricha rhodopa is a moth of the family Gelechiidae. It was described by Edward Meyrick in 1908. It is found in Assam, India.

The wingspan is about 11 mm. The forewings are whitish ochreous with the base of the costa slenderly blackish and with a dark fuscous streak at the first, thick but rapidly attenuated rising from the dorsum near the base and running in a curve near the costa to the disc at four-fifths and a similar less curved streak from the middle of the dorsum, posteriorly coincident with the first. Between and beyond these, the dorsal half of the wing is mainly occupied by two white blotches and there is an acutely inwards angulated dark fuscous mark above the tornus, and a longitudinal mark beneath the costa opposite it. The apical area beyond these is mostly suffused with white, with a black dot beneath the apex. The hindwings are light grey, thinly scaled anteriorly.
