= Thiotricha gemmulans =

Scientific classification
- Domain: Eukaryota
- Kingdom: Animalia
- Phylum: Arthropoda
- Class: Insecta
- Order: Lepidoptera
- Family: Gelechiidae
- Genus: Thiotricha
- Species: T. gemmulans

Binomial name
- Thiotricha gemmulans Meyrick, 1931

Species of moth

Thiotricha gemmulans is a moth of the family Gelechiidae. It was described by Edward Meyrick in 1931. It is found in southern India.
