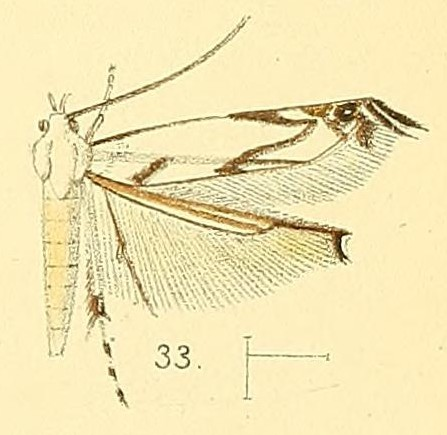

Scientific classification
- Domain: Eukaryota
- Kingdom: Animalia
- Phylum: Arthropoda
- Class: Insecta
- Order: Lepidoptera
- Family: Gelechiidae
- Genus: Thiotricha
- Species: T. tenuis

Binomial name
- Thiotricha tenuis (Walsingham, 1891)

Synonyms
- Polyhymno tenuis Walsingham, 1891; Thiotricha tenuis f. candidella Legrand, 1966

= Thiotricha tenuis =

Species of moth

Thiotricha tenuis is a moth of the family Gelechiidae. It was described by Thomas de Grey, 6th Baron Walsingham, in 1891. It is found on the Seychelles, Mauritius, Réunion, South Africa and Gambia.

The wingspan is 9–10 mm. The forewings are shining white, with the apex, one costal, and two dorsal oblique streaks, greyish brown. The first dorsal streak commences at one-fourth from the base, is short, stout, outwardly oblique, and reaches to the fold. The second dorsal streak commences about the middle of the dorsal margin, is wide at its base, tapering upwards in a very oblique outward direction, crossing the fold, and attenuated to a slender line in the direction of the apex, before which it meets the scarcely less oblique but much shorter costal streak, which commences at about one-third from the apex. Beyond and near the costal streak is a greyish brown shade extending to the apex and at the extreme apex is a dark brown spot narrowly set in white, to which two slender greyish brown streaks running through the white apical cilia give an eye-like effect. These streaks are bent downward at the apex, and, together with a large patch of brown scales in the subapical cilia, increase the falcate appearance to the wing-tip. They are distinctly visible on the under side. The hindwings are pale shining grey.

The larvae have been recorded feeding on Morinda citrifolia.

== Subspecies ==
- Thiotricha tenuis tenuis
- Thiotricha tenuis subtenuis Legrand, 1965 (Menai)
