= Thiotricha epiclista =

Scientific classification
- Domain: Eukaryota
- Kingdom: Animalia
- Phylum: Arthropoda
- Class: Insecta
- Order: Lepidoptera
- Family: Gelechiidae
- Genus: Thiotricha
- Species: T. epiclista

Binomial name
- Thiotricha epiclista Meyrick, 1908

Species of moth

Thiotricha epiclista is a moth of the family Gelechiidae. It was described by Edward Meyrick in 1908. It is found in Assam, India.

The wingspan is about 9 mm. The forewings are shining dark grey with an orange patch occupying the apical third of the wing, not reaching the margins except at the apex and tornus, enclosing a wedge-shaped blackish terminal streak, and with its anterior end indented by an acute triangular projection of ground colour. There is a blackish streak crossing this patch from near the lower anterior angle almost to the apex, and a blackish longitudinal dash above this. Three white dots are found on the costa posteriorly, and there is a black apical dot, as well as some indistinct whitish dots or strigulae on the dorsum posteriorly and at the termen. The hindwings are rather dark grey.
