= Thiotricha balanopa =

Scientific classification
- Domain: Eukaryota
- Kingdom: Animalia
- Phylum: Arthropoda
- Class: Insecta
- Order: Lepidoptera
- Family: Gelechiidae
- Genus: Thiotricha
- Species: T. balanopa

Binomial name
- Thiotricha balanopa Meyrick, 1918

Species of moth

Thiotricha balanopa is a moth of the family Gelechiidae. It was described by Edward Meyrick in 1918. It is found on Borneo and in Assam, India.

The wingspan is 8–11 mm. The forewings are shining white with a cloudy fuscous spot above the tornus emitting an oblique strigula. There are two oblique dark fuscous strigulte from the costa near the apex and an oval or elongate black apical spot. The hindwings are grey.
