= Thiotricha parthenica =

Scientific classification
- Domain: Eukaryota
- Kingdom: Animalia
- Phylum: Arthropoda
- Class: Insecta
- Order: Lepidoptera
- Family: Gelechiidae
- Genus: Thiotricha
- Species: T. parthenica

Binomial name
- Thiotricha parthenica Meyrick, 1904

Species of moth

Thiotricha parthenica is a moth of the family Gelechiidae. It was described by Edward Meyrick in 1904. It is found in Australia, where it has been recorded from New South Wales and Tasmania.

The wingspan is 13–14 mm (0.51–0.55 in). The forewings are rather deep ochreous yellow with the costal edge dark fuscous towards the base and with a minute black dot beneath the costa at one-third, and the stigmata minute and black, the plical obliquely before the first discal, but all these apparently sometimes absent. The hindwings are light grey.

The larvae are case bearing. The case is tolerably cylindrical, thick, rather curved and composed of withered fragments of leaf superposed in tiers. They feed on Grevillea punicea, boring holes into the undersurface and discolouring the uppersurface in small blotches.
