= Palumbina longipalpis =

Scientific classification
- Domain: Eukaryota
- Kingdom: Animalia
- Phylum: Arthropoda
- Class: Insecta
- Order: Lepidoptera
- Family: Gelechiidae
- Genus: Palumbina
- Species: P. longipalpis

Binomial name
- Palumbina longipalpis (Bradley, 1961)

Synonyms
- Thyrsostoma longipalpis Bradley, 1961

Species of moth

Palumbina longipalpis is a moth of the family Gelechiidae. It was described by John David Bradley in 1961. It is found on Guadalcanal in the Solomon Islands.
