= Thiotricha chrysantha =

Scientific classification
- Domain: Eukaryota
- Kingdom: Animalia
- Phylum: Arthropoda
- Class: Insecta
- Order: Lepidoptera
- Family: Gelechiidae
- Genus: Thiotricha
- Species: T. chrysantha

Binomial name
- Thiotricha chrysantha Meyrick, 1908

Species of moth

Thiotricha chrysantha is a moth of the family Gelechiidae. It was described by Edward Meyrick in 1908. It is found in Assam, India.

== Description ==
The wingspan is about 11 mm. The forewings are deep ochreous yellow, suffused with orange red on the margins of the dark markings. There are two pairs of very oblique dark fuscous streaks from the costa and the dorsum near the base and before the middle respectively, each pair meeting at a very acute angle, the first connected with the second in the disc by dark fuscous suffusion, the angle of the second extended as a blackish line to the termen beneath the apex. There are two white dorsal blotches between and beyond these streaks respectively, the second followed by a dot of dark fuscous suffusion. An oblique blackish wedge-shaped mark is found from the costa at three-fourths, edged with pink. The hindwings are blackish grey, thinly scaled towards the base.
