= Thiotricha xanthaspis =

Scientific classification
- Domain: Eukaryota
- Kingdom: Animalia
- Phylum: Arthropoda
- Class: Insecta
- Order: Lepidoptera
- Family: Gelechiidae
- Genus: Thiotricha
- Species: T. xanthaspis

Binomial name
- Thiotricha xanthaspis Meyrick, 1918

Species of moth

Thiotricha xanthaspis is a moth of the family Gelechiidae. It was described by Edward Meyrick in 1918. It is found in Assam, India.

The wingspan is about 11 mm. The forewings are shining white with an ochreous-orange suffused blotch extending along the apical third of the costa. There is a narrow irregular line from the costa rather inwards-oblique dark fuscous fascia at two-thirds, sometimes not quite reaching the margins. There is a small blackish dot just above the apex, and one on the termen slightly anterior. The hindwings are grey, the costa and termen are suffused with dark grey, the apex are pale orange.
