= Thiotricha oxygramma =

Scientific classification
- Domain: Eukaryota
- Kingdom: Animalia
- Phylum: Arthropoda
- Class: Insecta
- Order: Lepidoptera
- Family: Gelechiidae
- Genus: Thiotricha
- Species: T. oxygramma

Binomial name
- Thiotricha oxygramma Meyrick, 1918

Species of moth

Thiotricha oxygramma is a moth of the family Gelechiidae. It was described by Edward Meyrick in 1918. It is found in Assam, India.

The wingspan is about 12 mm. The forewings are light greyish ochreous with the extreme costal edge white towards the middle and with a very oblique whitish line, strongly edged with dark grey on both sides, from the costa at one-fifth, and one from the tornus, acutely angulated inwards on the fold, meeting it at an acute angle near the apex. There is a whitish mark on the middle of the termen and a black apical dot, edged anteriorly with whitish. The hindwings are grey, paler anteriorly, and with the extreme tip whitish.
