= Thiotricha fusca =

Scientific classification
- Domain: Eukaryota
- Kingdom: Animalia
- Phylum: Arthropoda
- Class: Insecta
- Order: Lepidoptera
- Family: Gelechiidae
- Genus: Thiotricha
- Species: T. fusca

Binomial name
- Thiotricha fusca M. Omelko, 1993

Synonyms
- Polyhymno fusca Ponomarenko, Park & Bae, 2006

Species of moth

Thiotricha fusca (Japanese: カギツマクロキバガ, romanized: Kagitsuma-kuro-kibaga) is a moth of the family Gelechiidae. It was described by Mikhail Mikhailovich Omelko in 1993. It is found in Japan, the Russian Far East (Primorye) and China (Jilin).
