= Thiotricha prosoestea =

Scientific classification
- Domain: Eukaryota
- Kingdom: Animalia
- Phylum: Arthropoda
- Class: Insecta
- Order: Lepidoptera
- Family: Gelechiidae
- Genus: Thiotricha
- Species: T. prosoestea

Binomial name
- Thiotricha prosoestea Turner, 1919

Species of moth

Thiotricha prosoestea is a moth of the family Gelechiidae. It was described by Alfred Jefferis Turner in 1919. It is found in Australia, where it has been recorded from Queensland.

The wingspan is about 8 mm. The forewings are shining white with some grey suffusion along the dorsum and a bright orange apical patch occupying the apical fifth of the wing, but separated from the termen by two white spots divided by grey. A broad grey fascia precedes the apical patch and there is a black apical dot continued along the upper part of the termen. The hindwings are pale-grey with a black dot at the apex.
