= Thiotricha atractodes =

Scientific classification
- Domain: Eukaryota
- Kingdom: Animalia
- Phylum: Arthropoda
- Class: Insecta
- Order: Lepidoptera
- Family: Gelechiidae
- Genus: Thiotricha
- Species: T. atractodes

Binomial name
- Thiotricha atractodes Meyrick, 1922

Species of moth

Thiotricha atractodes is a moth of the family Gelechiidae. It was described by Edward Meyrick in 1922. It is found in Australia, where it has been recorded from Queensland.

The wingspan is about 12 mm. The forewings are ochreous whitish with the dorsal area grey within a yellow-whitish streak along the fold, the dorsum whitish towards the base and the extreme costal edge dark fuscous anteriorly. There is a grey subcostal line from the base to a grey patch occupying the apical half of the wing, including a light orange upcurved streak from above the tornus to the apex, and a similar terminal streak meeting it at the extremities. There is also a round black apical dot preceded on the costa by a small white dot. The hindwings are grey with a small black apical dot preceded by whitish.
