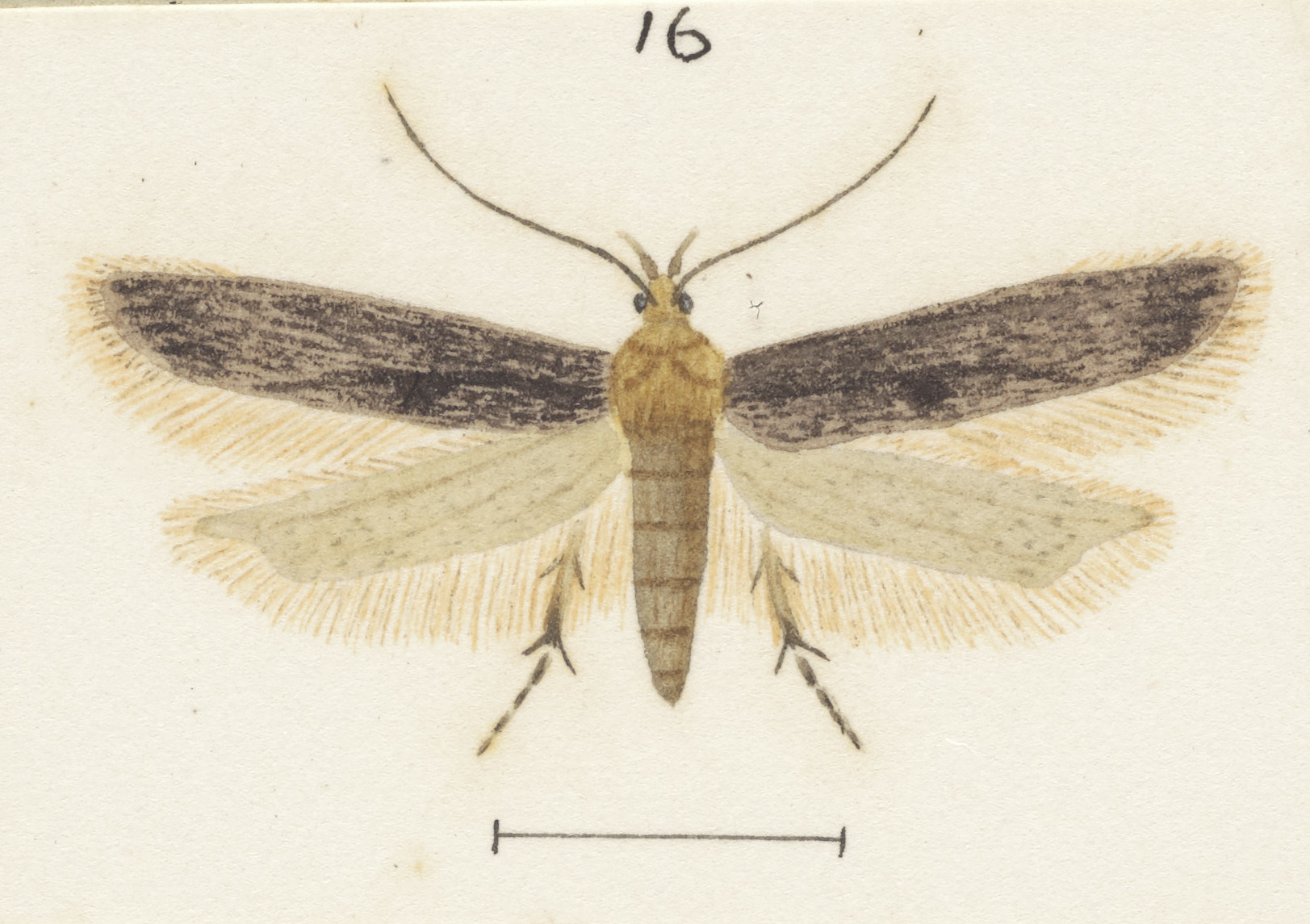

Scientific classification
- Kingdom: Animalia
- Phylum: Arthropoda
- Class: Insecta
- Order: Lepidoptera
- Family: Gelechiidae
- Genus: Thiotricha
- Species: T. thorybodes

Binomial name
- Thiotricha thorybodes (Meyrick, 1885)

Synonyms
- Thistricha thorybodes Meyrick, 1885

= Thiotricha thorybodes =

Species of moth

Thiotricha thorybodes is a species of moth in the family Gelechiidae. It was described by Edward Meyrick in 1885. It is endemic to New Zealand.

== Taxonomy ==
This species was first described by Edward Meyrick in 1885 and named Thistricha tyorybodes. in 1886 Meyrick gave a fuller description of this species under the name Thiotricha thorybodes.

== Description ==
The wingspan is 11–13 mm. The forewings are rather dark fuscous, irregularly irrorated with ochreous-whitish, more strongly in the disc. The costa is suffusedly darker, with a darker triangular patch before the middle, its apex reaching to the fold. There is an obscure dark fuscous dot in the disc slightly beyond the middle and a small whitish-ochreous spot, sometimes nearly obsolete, in the disc at three-fourths. The hindwings are grey-whitish or whitish-grey.
