= Thiotricha characias =

Scientific classification
- Domain: Eukaryota
- Kingdom: Animalia
- Phylum: Arthropoda
- Class: Insecta
- Order: Lepidoptera
- Family: Gelechiidae
- Genus: Thiotricha
- Species: T. characias

Binomial name
- Thiotricha characias Meyrick, 1918

Species of moth

Thiotricha characias is a moth of the family Gelechiidae. It was described by Edward Meyrick in 1918. It is found in southern India.

The wingspan is 13–14 mm. The forewings are pale greyish ochreous, with the dorsum in males slenderly suffused with fuscous. There is a slender very oblique blackish streak from near the dorsum in the middle, reaching two-thirds of the way across the wing. The apical fourth is more or less infuscated, browner towards the termen and there is a whitish wedge-shaped mark on the tornus, and a dot on the costa opposite. A snow-white dot is found before the apex, partially edged with blackish, and a whitish dot on the termen beneath it. The hindwings are light grey, thinly scaled anteriorly and with a blackish apical dot.
