= Palumbina fissilis =

Scientific classification
- Domain: Eukaryota
- Kingdom: Animalia
- Phylum: Arthropoda
- Class: Insecta
- Order: Lepidoptera
- Family: Gelechiidae
- Genus: Palumbina
- Species: P. fissilis

Binomial name
- Palumbina fissilis (Meyrick, 1918)

Synonyms
- Thyrsostoma fissilis Meyrick, 1918

Species of moth

Palumbina fissilis is a moth of the family Gelechiidae. It was described by Edward Meyrick in 1918. It is found in Assam, India.

The wingspan is about 8 mm. The forewings are grey with white markings and a narrow inwardly oblique fascia at one-third, as well as two transversely placed connected triangular spots in the disc at two-thirds. There is a spot crossing the wing near the apex. The hindwings are grey.
