= Thiotricha termanthes =

Scientific classification
- Domain: Eukaryota
- Kingdom: Animalia
- Phylum: Arthropoda
- Class: Insecta
- Order: Lepidoptera
- Family: Gelechiidae
- Genus: Thiotricha
- Species: T. termanthes

Binomial name
- Thiotricha termanthes Meyrick, 1929

Species of moth

Thiotricha termanthes is a moth of the family Gelechiidae. It was described by Edward Meyrick in 1929. It is found in Assam, India.

The wingspan is about 10 mm.
