= Thiotricha trapezoidella =

Scientific classification
- Domain: Eukaryota
- Kingdom: Animalia
- Phylum: Arthropoda
- Class: Insecta
- Order: Lepidoptera
- Family: Gelechiidae
- Genus: Thiotricha
- Species: T. trapezoidella

Binomial name
- Thiotricha trapezoidella (Caradja, 1920)

Synonyms
- Mystax trapezoidella Caradja, 1920; Polyhymno trapezoidella

Species of moth

Thiotricha trapezoidella is a moth of the family Gelechiidae. It was described by Aristide Caradja in 1920. It is found in the Russian Far East and Japan.
