= Thiotricha margarodes =

Scientific classification
- Domain: Eukaryota
- Kingdom: Animalia
- Phylum: Arthropoda
- Class: Insecta
- Order: Lepidoptera
- Family: Gelechiidae
- Genus: Thiotricha
- Species: T. margarodes

Binomial name
- Thiotricha margarodes Meyrick, 1904

Species of moth

Thiotricha margarodes is a moth of the family Gelechiidae. It was described by Edward Meyrick in 1904. It is found in Australia, where it has been recorded from Queensland.

The wingspan is 9–10 mm (0.35–0.39 in). The forewings are shining white, with a faint ochreous tinge and a semi-oval leaden-grey spot along the lower half of the termen, edged anteriorly with a dark fuscous line. There are two outwardly oblique dark fuscous lines from the costa towards the apex and a black apical dot, preceded by orange. The hindwings are light grey.
