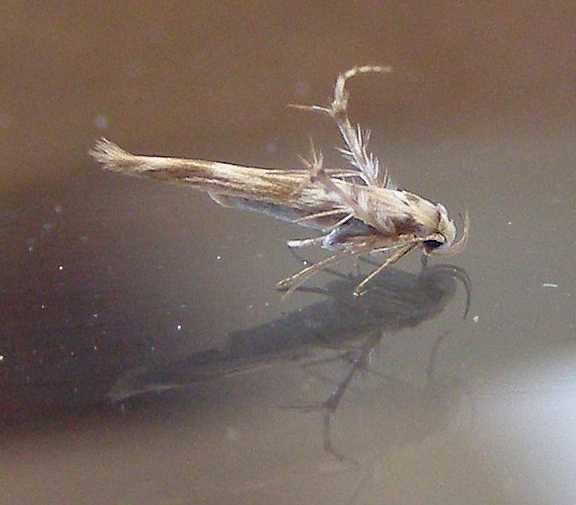
- Palumbina guerinii

Scientific classification
- Kingdom: Animalia
- Phylum: Arthropoda
- Clade: Pancrustacea
- Class: Insecta
- Order: Lepidoptera
- Family: Gelechiidae
- Subfamily: Thiotrichinae
- Genus: Palumbina; Rondani, 1876

Type species
- Palumbina guerinii (Stainton, 1858)

Synonyms
- Thyrsostoma Meyrick, 1907

= Palumbina =

Genus of moths

Palumbina is a genus of moths in the family Gelechiidae.

== Species ==
The species of this genus are:

- Palumbina albilustra Walia & Wadahawan, 2004 (from India)
- Palumbina chelophora (Meyrick, 1918) (from India)
- Palumbina diplobathra (Meyrick, 1918) (from India)
- Palumbina fissilis (Meyrick, 1918) (from India)
- Palumbina glaucitis Meyrick, 1907 (from India and Sri Lanka))
- Palumbina guerinii (Stainton, 1858) (Mediterranean & Kenya)
- Palumbina longipalpis Bradley, 1961 (from Guadalcanal)
- Palumbina macrodelta (Meyrick, 1918) (from India)
- Palumbina nephelochtha (Meyrick, 1927) (from Samoa)
- Palumbina nesoclera Meyrick, 1929
- Palumbina oxyprora (Meyrick, 1922) (from China)
- Palumbina pylartis (Meyrick, 1908) (from India)
- Palumbina shivai Walia & Wadahawan, 2004 (from India)
- Palumbina tanyrrhina (Meyrick, 1921) (from Java)
- Palumbina triphona (Meyrick, 1927) (from Samoa)
