= Thiotricha oxytheces =

Scientific classification
- Domain: Eukaryota
- Kingdom: Animalia
- Phylum: Arthropoda
- Class: Insecta
- Order: Lepidoptera
- Family: Gelechiidae
- Genus: Thiotricha
- Species: T. oxytheces

Binomial name
- Thiotricha oxytheces Meyrick, 1904

Species of moth

Thiotricha oxytheces is a moth of the family Gelechiidae. It was described by Edward Meyrick in 1904. It is found in Australia, where it has been recorded from New South Wales and Queensland.

The wingspan is 9–10 mm (0.35–0.39 in). The forewings are pale shining bronzy ochreous, more whitish towards the costa anteriorly. The costal edge is dark fuscous on the anterior half and there is a suffused fuscous mark along the dorsum from one-fifth to the middle and a suffused whitish streak along the posterior half of the dorsum, interrupted by an elongate fuscous mark on the submedian fold. An outwardly oblique white fuscous-edged mark is found above the tornus, and a white costal dot above its upper extremity. There is also a black apical dot. The hindwings are light grey with a minute black apical dot.
