= Thiotricha anticentra =

Scientific classification
- Domain: Eukaryota
- Kingdom: Animalia
- Phylum: Arthropoda
- Class: Insecta
- Order: Lepidoptera
- Family: Gelechiidae
- Genus: Thiotricha
- Species: T. anticentra

Binomial name
- Thiotricha anticentra Meyrick, 1904

Species of moth

Thiotricha anticentra is a moth of the family Gelechiidae. It was described by Edward Meyrick in 1904. It is found in Australia, where it has been recorded from Queensland.

The wingspan is about 13 mm (0.51 in). The forewings are whitish, sprinkled with fuscous and dark fuscous and with a moderate blackish dot on the base of the costa, as well as a blackish dash beneath the fold at one-fourth, and one beneath the costa at one-third. The stigmata are blackish, the plical dash like, obliquely before the first discal, which is in the middle. Minute blackish dots are found along the termen and apical part of the costa. The hindwings are grey.
