= Thiotricha janitrix =

Scientific classification
- Domain: Eukaryota
- Kingdom: Animalia
- Phylum: Arthropoda
- Class: Insecta
- Order: Lepidoptera
- Family: Gelechiidae
- Genus: Thiotricha
- Species: T. janitrix

Binomial name
- Thiotricha janitrix Meyrick, 1912

Species of moth

Thiotricha janitrix is a moth of the family Gelechiidae. It was described by Edward Meyrick in 1912. It is found in the Bengal region of what was British India.

The wingspan is about 8 mm. The forewings are shining ashy grey with elongate whitish marks along the dorsum before and beyond the middle, and a third on the tornus forming a very oblique wedge. There is an indistinct streak of whitish suffusion in the disc from beyond the middle to near the apex, where it meets a white oblique strigula from the costa, and a longer very oblique white striga from the apex of the tornal wedge-shaped mark. There is also a lunulate white mark before the apex, cutting off a small apical spot which is edged above and beneath with blackish. The apical area of the wing between and round these pale markings dark fuscous. The hindwings are grey with a blackish apical dot.
