= Palumbina oxyprora =

Scientific classification
- Domain: Eukaryota
- Kingdom: Animalia
- Phylum: Arthropoda
- Class: Insecta
- Order: Lepidoptera
- Family: Gelechiidae
- Genus: Palumbina
- Species: P. oxyprora

Binomial name
- Palumbina oxyprora (Meyrick, 1922)

Synonyms
- Thyrsostoma oxyprora Meyrick, 1922

Species of moth

Palumbina oxyprora is a moth of the family Gelechiidae. It was described by Edward Meyrick in 1922. It is found in Shanghai, China.

The wingspan is about 12 mm. The forewings are violet grey with whitish markings. There is a short streak on the base of the dorsum, reaching at the base halfway across the wing. A fine indistinct line runs along the fold and there is a narrow fascia before the middle inwards-oblique from the costa. There is a fine line above middle from one-fourth to three-fourths, a streak beneath it from one-half to two-thirds, and a short dorsal mark beneath the posterior part of this. There is also a streak from the middle of the termen to the costa just before the apex, irregularly dilated on the lower portion, fine above. The hindwings are grey.
