= Thiotricha chinochrysa =

Scientific classification
- Kingdom: Animalia
- Phylum: Arthropoda
- Clade: Pancrustacea
- Class: Insecta
- Order: Lepidoptera
- Family: Gelechiidae
- Genus: Thiotricha
- Species: T. chinochrysa

Binomial name
- Thiotricha chinochrysa Diakonoff, 1954

Species of moth

Thiotricha chinochrysa is a moth of the family Gelechiidae. It was described by Alexey Diakonoff in 1954. It is found in New Guinea.
