= Palumbina nesoclera =

Scientific classification
- Domain: Eukaryota
- Kingdom: Animalia
- Phylum: Arthropoda
- Class: Insecta
- Order: Lepidoptera
- Family: Gelechiidae
- Genus: Palumbina
- Species: P. nesoclera

Binomial name
- Palumbina nesoclera (Meyrick, 1929)

Synonyms
- Thyrsostoma nesoclera Meyrick, 1929

Species of moth

Palumbina nesoclera is a moth of the family Gelechiidae. It was described by Edward Meyrick in 1929. It is found in India's Andaman Islands.

The wingspan is about 12 mm.
