= Thiotricha clinopeda =

Scientific classification
- Domain: Eukaryota
- Kingdom: Animalia
- Phylum: Arthropoda
- Class: Insecta
- Order: Lepidoptera
- Family: Gelechiidae
- Genus: Thiotricha
- Species: T. clinopeda

Binomial name
- Thiotricha clinopeda Meyrick, 1918

Species of moth

Thiotricha clinopeda is a moth of the family Gelechiidae. It was described by Edward Meyrick in 1918. It is found in Sri Lanka and Kodagu district in southern India.

The wingspan is 9–11 mm. The forewings are shining white with a very oblique dark fuscous fasciate blotch from the dorsum at one-third, reaching more than halfway across the wing, dilated downwards. There is an oblique wedge-shaped dark fuscous spot from the dorsum at two-thirds, its apex confluent with the angle of the following line. A very oblique wedge-shaped dark fuscous streak is found from the costa at three-fourths, its apex sending a dark fuscous line to the tornus, thickened and acutely angulated inwards on the fold. There is also a fuscous spot on the costa near the apex and a dark fuscous spot on the termen beneath the apex, as well as a small black apical spot, preceded and followed by minute white dots. The hindwings are grey, paler in the disc anteriorly.
