= Thiotricha prunifolivora =

Scientific classification
- Domain: Eukaryota
- Kingdom: Animalia
- Phylum: Arthropoda
- Class: Insecta
- Order: Lepidoptera
- Family: Gelechiidae
- Genus: Thiotricha
- Species: T. prunifolivora

Binomial name
- Thiotricha prunifolivora Ueda & Fujiwara, 2005

Species of moth

Thiotricha prunifolivora is a moth of the family Gelechiidae. It was described by Ueda and Fujiwara in 2005. It is found in Japan (Honshu, Ryukyus).

The wingspan is 3-4.5 mm for males and 4.7–5 mm for females.

The larvae feed on Symplocos prunifolia.
