= Thiotricha synodonta =

Scientific classification
- Domain: Eukaryota
- Kingdom: Animalia
- Phylum: Arthropoda
- Class: Insecta
- Order: Lepidoptera
- Family: Gelechiidae
- Genus: Thiotricha
- Species: T. synodonta

Binomial name
- Thiotricha synodonta Meyrick, 1936

Species of moth

Thiotricha synodonta is a moth of the family Gelechiidae. It was described by Edward Meyrick in 1936. It is found in Korea and Japan.
