= Thiotricha arthrodes =

Scientific classification
- Domain: Eukaryota
- Kingdom: Animalia
- Phylum: Arthropoda
- Class: Insecta
- Order: Lepidoptera
- Family: Gelechiidae
- Genus: Thiotricha
- Species: T. arthrodes

Binomial name
- Thiotricha arthrodes Meyrick, 1904

Species of moth

Thiotricha arthrodes is a moth of the family Gelechiidae. It was described by Edward Meyrick in 1904. It is found in Australia, where it has been recorded from New South Wales.

The wingspan is 10–12 mm (0.39–0.47 in). The forewings are shining ochreous whitish, posteriorly suffused with pale brownish ochreous and with a short dark fuscous costal streak at the base. There is an elongate-triangular dark fuscous costal spot before the middle, reaching two-thirds of the way across the wing, as well as an ill-defined dark fuscous fascia beyond the middle, narrowed beneath. There is an ochreous-yellow streak along the submedian fold between these and there is also an apical spot of dark fuscous suffusion. The hindwings are grey.
