= Thiotricha galactaea =

Scientific classification
- Domain: Eukaryota
- Kingdom: Animalia
- Phylum: Arthropoda
- Class: Insecta
- Order: Lepidoptera
- Family: Gelechiidae
- Genus: Thiotricha
- Species: T. galactaea

Binomial name
- Thiotricha galactaea Meyrick, 1908

Species of moth

Thiotricha galactaea is a moth of the family Gelechiidae. It was described by Edward Meyrick in 1908. It is found in southern India.

The wingspan is 13–15 millimetres (0.51–0.59 in). The forewings are ochreous whitish with two elongate blackish dots obliquely placed towards the dorsum at about one-fourth and a very oblique blackish median streak reaching from near the dorsum to above the middle. There is a blackish longitudinal mark above the dorsum towards the tornus and the posterior fourth of the costa, and termen is more or less suffused with dark fuscous. A short oblique whitish streak is found from the costa at four-fifths, and a whitish streak almost along the termen. There is also a white dot before the apex, partially edged with black. The hindwings are pale grey, thinly scaled and with a dark grey dot at the apex.
