= Thiotricha laterestriata =

Scientific classification
- Domain: Eukaryota
- Kingdom: Animalia
- Phylum: Arthropoda
- Class: Insecta
- Order: Lepidoptera
- Family: Gelechiidae
- Genus: Thiotricha
- Species: T. laterestriata

Binomial name
- Thiotricha laterestriata (Walsingham, 1897)

Synonyms
- Polyhymno laterestriata Walsingham, 1897

Species of moth

Thiotricha laterestriata is a moth of the family Gelechiidae. It was described by Thomas de Grey in 1897. It is found on the West Indies.

The wingspan is about 10 mm. The forewings are shining silvery white, the extreme apical portion bright orange. There is a very oblique brownish-grey costal streak, followed by a scarcely less oblique white one, runs through the orange space nearly to a conspicuous white-margined black spot at the apex, and is met by a more slender oblique streak from the dorsum, also followed by a parallel white streak, wider than the one above it, and nearly divided at its middle by a slender dark line reverting from the tornus. The hindwings are whitish grey.
