= Thiotricha corylella =

Scientific classification
- Domain: Eukaryota
- Kingdom: Animalia
- Phylum: Arthropoda
- Class: Insecta
- Order: Lepidoptera
- Family: Gelechiidae
- Genus: Thiotricha
- Species: T. corylella

Binomial name
- Thiotricha corylella M. Omelko, 1993

Synonyms
- Polyhymno corylella

Species of moth

Thiotricha corylella is a moth of the family Gelechiidae. It was described by Mikhail Mikhailovich Omelko in 1993. It is found in Japan, the Russian Far East (Primorsky Krai) and China (Jilin).
