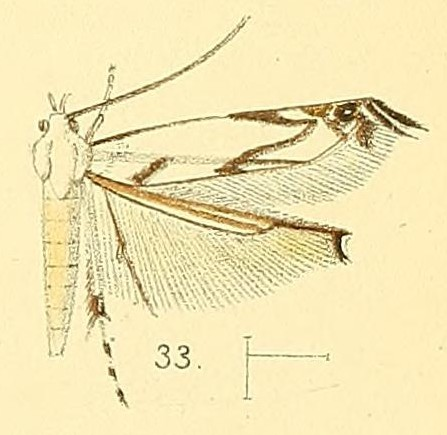
- Thiotricha tenuis

Scientific classification
- Domain: Eukaryota
- Kingdom: Animalia
- Phylum: Arthropoda
- Class: Insecta
- Order: Lepidoptera
- Family: Gelechiidae
- Subfamily: Thiotrichinae
- Genus: Thiotricha; Meyrick, 1885 [As Thistricha]

Synonyms
- Reuttia Hofmann, 1898; Mystax Caradja, 1920; Mistax Caradja, 1920

= Thiotricha =

Genus of moths

Thiotricha is a genus of moths in the family Gelechiidae, subfamily Thiotrichinae.

== Species ==
- Thiotricha acrantha Meyrick, 1908
- Thiotricha acronipha Turner, 1919
- Thiotricha acrophantis Meyrick, 1936
- Thiotricha albicephalata Walia and Wadhawan, 2004
- Thiotricha amphixysta Meyrick, 1929
- Thiotricha anarpastis Meyrick, 1927
- Thiotricha angelica Bradley, 1961 (Solomon Islands)
- Thiotricha animosella (Walker, 1864)
- Thiotricha anticentra Meyrick, 1904
- Thiotricha argyrea Turner, 1919
- Thiotricha arthrodes Meyrick, 1904
- Thiotricha attenuata Omelko, 1993
- Thiotricha atractodes Meyrick, 1922
- Thiotricha aucupatrix Meyrick, 1929
- Thiotricha balanopa Meyrick, 1918
- Thiotricha bullata Meyrick, 1904
- Thiotricha celata Omelko, 1993
- Thiotricha centritis Meyrick, 1908
- Thiotricha characias Meyrick, 1918
- Thiotricha chinochrysa Diakonoff, 1954
- Thiotricha chrysantha Meyrick, 1908
- Thiotricha chrysopa Meyrick, 1904
- Thiotricha cleodorella (Zeller, 1877)
- Thiotricha clepsidoxa Meyrick, 1929
- Thiotricha clidias Meyrick, 1908
- Thiotricha clinopeda Meyrick, 1918
- Thiotricha coleella (Constant, 1885)
- Thiotricha complicata Meyrick, 1918
- Thiotricha corylella Omelko, 1993
- Thiotricha crypsichlora Meyrick, 1927
- Thiotricha cuneiformis Meyrick, 1918
- Thiotricha delacma Meyrick, 1923
- Thiotricha dissobola Meyrick, 1935
- Thiotricha embolarcha Meyrick, 1929
- Thiotricha epiclista Meyrick, 1908
- Thiotricha eremita Bradley, 1961 (Solomon Islands)
- Thiotricha flagellatrix Meyrick, 1929
- Thiotricha fridaella Legrand, 1958 (from Seychelles)
- Thiotricha fusca Omelko, 1993
- Thiotricha galactaea Meyrick, 1908
- Thiotricha galenaea Meyrick, 1908
- Thiotricha gemmulans Meyrick, 1931
- Thiotricha glenias Meyrick, 1908
- Thiotricha godmani (Walsingham, [1892])
- Thiotricha grammitis Meyrick, 1908
- Thiotricha hamulata Meyrick, 1921
- Thiotricha hemiphaea Turner, 1919
- Thiotricha hexanesa Meyrick, 1929
- Thiotricha hoplomacha Meyrick, 1908
- Thiotricha indistincta Omelko, 1993
- Thiotricha janitrix Meyrick, 1912
- Thiotricha laterestriata (Walsingham, 1897)
- Thiotricha leucothona Meyrick, 1904
- Thiotricha lindsayi Philpott, 1927
- Thiotricha majorella (Rebel, 1910)
- Thiotricha margarodes Meyrick, 1904
- Thiotricha melanacma Bradley, 1961 (Solomon Islands)
- Thiotricha microrrhoda Meyrick, 1935
- Thiotricha nephelodesma Meyrick, 1926
- Thiotricha nephodesma Meyrick, 1918
- Thiotricha niphastis Meyrick, 1904
- Thiotricha obliquata (Matsumura, 1931)
- Thiotricha obvoluta Meyrick, 1918
- Thiotricha oleariae Hudson, 1928
- Thiotricha operaria Meyrick, 1918
- Thiotricha orthiastis Meyrick, 1905
- Thiotricha oxygramma Meyrick, 1918
- Thiotricha oxyopis Meyrick, 1927
- Thiotricha oxytheces Meyrick, 1904
- Thiotricha pancratiastis Meyrick, 1921
- Thiotricha panglycera Turner, 1919
- Thiotricha paraconta Meyrick, 1904
- Thiotricha parthenica Meyrick, 1904
- Thiotricha polyaula Meyrick, 1918
- Thiotricha pontifera Meyrick, 1932
- Thiotricha prosoestea Turner, 1919
- Thiotricha prunifolivora Ueda & Fujiwara, 2005
- Thiotricha pteropis Meyrick, 1908
- Thiotricha pyrphora Meyrick, 1918
- Thiotricha rabida Meyrick, 1929
- Thiotricha rhodomicta Meyrick, 1918
- Thiotricha rhodopa Meyrick, 1908
- Thiotricha saulotis Meyrick, 1906
- Thiotricha scioplecta Meyrick, 1918
- Thiotricha sciurella (Walsingham, 1897)
- Thiotricha scotaea Meyrick, 1908
- Thiotricha strophiacma Meyrick, 1927
- Thiotricha subocellea (Stephens, 1834)
- Thiotricha symphoracma Meyrick, 1927
- Thiotricha synacma Meyrick, 1918
- Thiotricha syncentritis Meyrick, 1935
- Thiotricha synodonta Meyrick, 1936
- Thiotricha tenuis (Walsingham, 1891) (The Gambia, Seychelles, South Africa)
- Thiotricha termanthes Meyrick, 1929
- Thiotricha tethela Bradley, 1961 (Solomon Islands)
- Thiotricha tetraphala Meyrick, 1885
- Thiotricha thorybodes Meyrick, 1885
- Thiotricha trapezoidella (Caradja, 1920)
- Thiotricha trichoma (Caradja, 1920)
- Thiotricha tylephora (Meyrick, 1935)
- Thiotricha wollastoni (Walsingham, 1894)
- Thiotricha xanthaspis Meyrick, 1918
- Thiotricha xanthodora Meyrick, 1923
