= Thiotricha argyrea =

Scientific classification
- Kingdom: Animalia
- Phylum: Arthropoda
- Clade: Pancrustacea
- Class: Insecta
- Order: Lepidoptera
- Family: Gelechiidae
- Genus: Thiotricha
- Species: T. argyrea

Binomial name
- Thiotricha argyrea Turner, 1919

Species of moth

Thiotricha argyrea is a moth of the family Gelechiidae. It was described by Alfred Jefferis Turner in 1919. It is found in Australia, where it has been recorded from Queensland.

The wingspan is about 12 mm. The forewings are shining-white with three suffused grey dorsal blotches, sub-basal, median and tornal. There is a short oblique grey streak from five-sixths of the costa, succeeded by a narrow parallel blackish streak. There is also a blackish apical dot. The hindwings are grey.
