= Thiotricha rhodomicta =

Scientific classification
- Domain: Eukaryota
- Kingdom: Animalia
- Phylum: Arthropoda
- Class: Insecta
- Order: Lepidoptera
- Family: Gelechiidae
- Genus: Thiotricha
- Species: T. rhodomicta

Binomial name
- Thiotricha rhodomicta Meyrick, 1918

Species of moth

Thiotricha rhodomicta is a moth of the family Gelechiidae. It was described by Edward Meyrick in 1918. It is found in Assam, India.

The wingspan is 12–16 mm. The forewings are brownish, more or less sprinkled with dark fuscous, sometimes partially suffused with carmine pink, sometimes mixed with ochreous whitish in the disc. There are dark fuscous dots towards the base near the costa and dorsum, and near the dorsum at one-fourth. There is a small suffused dark fuscous spot on or near the costa at one-third. The stigmata are suffused, dark fuscous or blackish, sometimes nearly obsolete, the plical obliquely before the first discal. Four or five ochreous-whitish lines converge to the apical projection posteriorly, one running along its lower edge. There is also a black subapical dot preceded by a silvery dot. The hindwings are grey, lighter anteriorly.
