= Thiotricha microrrhoda =

Scientific classification
- Domain: Eukaryota
- Kingdom: Animalia
- Phylum: Arthropoda
- Class: Insecta
- Order: Lepidoptera
- Family: Gelechiidae
- Genus: Thiotricha
- Species: T. microrrhoda

Binomial name
- Thiotricha microrrhoda Meyrick, 1935

Species of moth

Thiotricha microrrhoda is a moth of the family Gelechiidae. It was described by Edward Meyrick in 1935. It is found in Taiwan.
