= Thiotricha centritis =

Scientific classification
- Domain: Eukaryota
- Kingdom: Animalia
- Phylum: Arthropoda
- Class: Insecta
- Order: Lepidoptera
- Family: Gelechiidae
- Genus: Thiotricha
- Species: T. centritis

Binomial name
- Thiotricha centritis Meyrick, 1908

Species of moth

Thiotricha centritis is a moth of the family Gelechiidae. It was described by Edward Meyrick in 1908. It is found in southern India.

The wingspan is about 11 mm. The forewings are shining pale whitish ochreous with the apical third ochreous orange, anteriorly suffused. There is some grey suffusion on the dorsum before the tornus and on the middle of the termen and a large round black apical dot, edged with white in the cilia, which is otherwise whitish ochreous, around the apex with a grey median line. The hindwings are whitish grey, with the apex slightly tinged with orange and a blackish apical dot.
