= Thiotricha celata =

Scientific classification
- Domain: Eukaryota
- Kingdom: Animalia
- Phylum: Arthropoda
- Class: Insecta
- Order: Lepidoptera
- Family: Gelechiidae
- Genus: Thiotricha
- Species: T. celata

Binomial name
- Thiotricha celata M. Omelko, 1993

Synonyms
- Polyhymno celata

Species of moth

Thiotricha celata is a moth of the family Gelechiidae. It was described by Mikhail Mikhailovich Omelko in 1993. It is found in Korea, China (Jilin), Japan and the Russian Far East.
