= Thiotricha nephodesma =

Scientific classification
- Domain: Eukaryota
- Kingdom: Animalia
- Phylum: Arthropoda
- Class: Insecta
- Order: Lepidoptera
- Family: Gelechiidae
- Genus: Thiotricha
- Species: T. nephodesma

Binomial name
- Thiotricha nephodesma Meyrick, 1918

Species of moth

Thiotricha nephodesma is a moth of the family Gelechiidae. It was described by Edward Meyrick in 1918. It is found in Assam, India.

The wingspan is about 9 mm. The forewings are pale brownish ochreous with a very broad irregular-edged suffused somewhat oblique transverse dark fuscous band before the middle and a very fine fuscous median longitudinal line from this to near the apex. The apical third of the wing is suffused with whitish and the costal and terminal edges are shortly fuscous at about three-fourths. The hindwings are grey.
