= Thiotricha synacma =

Scientific classification
- Domain: Eukaryota
- Kingdom: Animalia
- Phylum: Arthropoda
- Class: Insecta
- Order: Lepidoptera
- Family: Gelechiidae
- Genus: Thiotricha
- Species: T. synacma

Binomial name
- Thiotricha synacma Meyrick, 1918

Species of moth

Thiotricha synacma is a moth of the family Gelechiidae. It was described by Edward Meyrick in 1918. It is found in Assam, India.

The wingspan is about 12 mm. The forewings are fuscous with ochreous-white markings. There is a broad pointed median streak from the base to near the apex and a streak from beneath this before the middle to the tornus. A line is found along the costa from the middle to a short oblique line from the costa terminating above the apex of the median streak and there is a very oblique line from above the tornus to beneath the apex of the median streak. A wedge-shaped streak is found along the lower half of the termen and a fine transverse blue-leaden-metallic line just beyond these markings before the apex. The apex is ochreous tinged and there is a small black apical dot preceded by a minute violet-silvery dot. The hindwings are grey, paler in the disc anteriorly.
