= Thiotricha albicephalata =

Scientific classification
- Domain: Eukaryota
- Kingdom: Animalia
- Phylum: Arthropoda
- Class: Insecta
- Order: Lepidoptera
- Family: Gelechiidae
- Genus: Thiotricha
- Species: T. albicephalata

Binomial name
- Thiotricha albicephalata Walia & Wadhawan, 2004

Species of moth

Thiotricha albicephalata is a moth of the family Gelechiidae. It was described by Walia and Wadhawan in 2004. It is found in northern India.
