= Thiotricha panglycera =

Scientific classification
- Domain: Eukaryota
- Kingdom: Animalia
- Phylum: Arthropoda
- Class: Insecta
- Order: Lepidoptera
- Family: Gelechiidae
- Genus: Thiotricha
- Species: T. panglycera

Binomial name
- Thiotricha panglycera Turner, 1919

Species of moth

Thiotricha panglycera is a moth of the family Gelechiidae. It was described by Alfred Jefferis Turner in 1919. It is found in Australia, where it has been recorded from Queensland.

The wingspan is 10–12 mm. The forewings are shining white with the apical two-fifths grey, the line of junction suffused. There is a broad orange subcostal streak from two-thirds to near the apex and a white dot between this and the costa at five-sixths. There is also an oblique white streak from the tornus to the centre of the orange mark, nearly confluent with a shorter white streak from the termen. A blackish dot separates this last from a white streak along the termen to the apex and there is a subapical blackish dot. The hindwings are pale-grey with the apical process ochreous-tinged with a blackish dot at the apex.
