= Thiotricha acronipha =

Scientific classification
- Domain: Eukaryota
- Kingdom: Animalia
- Phylum: Arthropoda
- Class: Insecta
- Order: Lepidoptera
- Family: Gelechiidae
- Genus: Thiotricha
- Species: T. acronipha

Binomial name
- Thiotricha acronipha Turner, 1919

Species of moth

Thiotricha acronipha is a moth of the family Gelechiidae. It was described by Alfred Jefferis Turner in 1919. It is found in Australia, where it has been recorded from Queensland.

The wingspan is about 11 mm. The forewings are whitish, towards the apex slightly ochreous-tinged and with a short longitudinal fuscous streak ending in the termen below the middle. From its anterior end a similar streak runs parallel to the termen and there is a short oblique streak from the costa at five-sixths, as well as an elongate clear white apical dot edged above with black beneath with fuscous. The hindwings are pale-grey with a minute fuscous apical dot.
