= Thiotricha fridaella =

Scientific classification
- Domain: Eukaryota
- Kingdom: Animalia
- Phylum: Arthropoda
- Class: Insecta
- Order: Lepidoptera
- Family: Gelechiidae
- Genus: Thiotricha
- Species: T. fridaella

Binomial name
- Thiotricha fridaella Legrand, 1958

Species of moth

Thiotricha fridaella is a moth of the family Gelechiidae. It was described by Henry Legrand in 1958. It is found on the Seychelles, where it has been recorded from Mahé and Silhouette.
