= Thiotricha nephelodesma =

Scientific classification
- Domain: Eukaryota
- Kingdom: Animalia
- Phylum: Arthropoda
- Class: Insecta
- Order: Lepidoptera
- Family: Gelechiidae
- Genus: Thiotricha
- Species: T. nephelodesma

Binomial name
- Thiotricha nephelodesma Meyrick, 1926

Species of moth

Thiotricha nephelodesma is a moth of the family Gelechiidae. It was described by Edward Meyrick in 1926. It is found on New Ireland in Papua New Guinea.

The wingspan is about 13 mm. The forewings are shining white with a moderate grey transverse fasciae in the middle and towards the apex, the costa and dorsum slenderly grey between these, the apex suffused with grey, confluent on the costa with the second fascia. The hindwings are grey.
