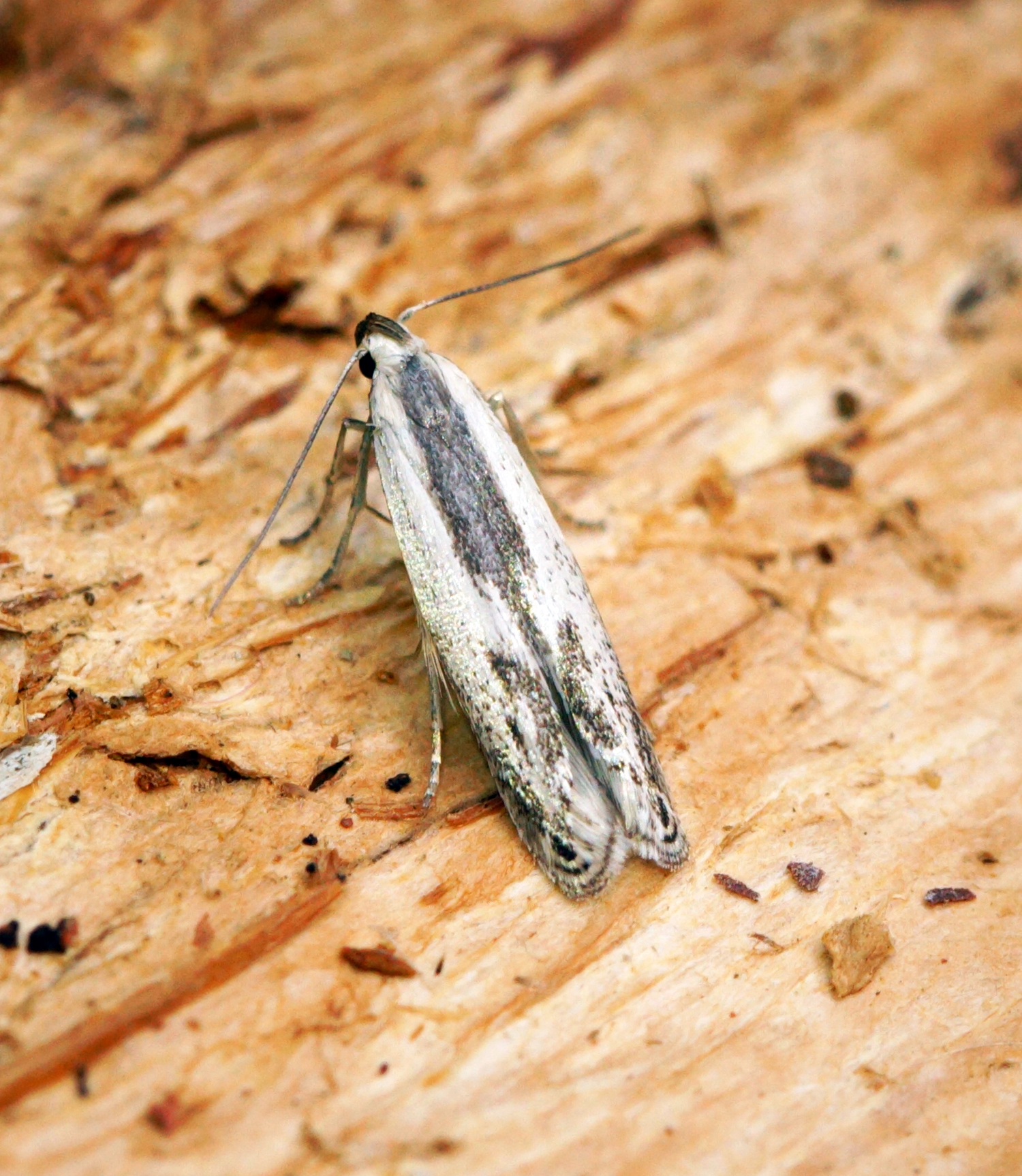

Scientific classification
- Domain: Eukaryota
- Kingdom: Animalia
- Phylum: Arthropoda
- Class: Insecta
- Order: Lepidoptera
- Family: Gelechiidae
- Genus: Thiotricha
- Species: T. subocellea

Binomial name
- Thiotricha subocellea (Stephens, 1834)

Synonyms
- Anacampsis subocellea Stephens, 1834; Gelechia internella Lienig & Zeller, 1846; Anacampsis dissonella Herrich-Schäffer, 1854; Gelechia subocellella Morris, 1870

= Thiotricha subocellea =

Species of moth

Thiotricha subocellea is a moth of the family Gelechiidae. It is found in most of Europe (except Ireland and most of the Balkan Peninsula), China (Gansu, Shaanxi, Jilin) and Japan.

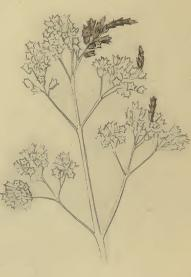
A sprig of Origanum vulgare bearing larval cases

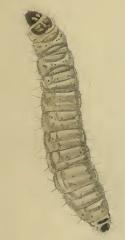
Larva

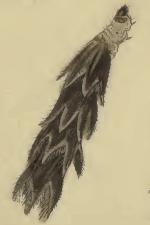
Larval case

The wingspan is 10–11 mm. They are on wing from July to August.
