= Thiotricha clidias =

Scientific classification
- Domain: Eukaryota
- Kingdom: Animalia
- Phylum: Arthropoda
- Class: Insecta
- Order: Lepidoptera
- Family: Gelechiidae
- Genus: Thiotricha
- Species: T. clidias

Binomial name
- Thiotricha clidias Meyrick, 1908

Species of moth

Thiotricha clidias is a moth of the family Gelechiidae. It was described by Edward Meyrick in 1908. It is found in Sri Lanka and Assam, India.

The wingspan is 8–11 millimetres (0.31–0.43 in). The forewings are ochreous whitish in males and pale greyish ochreous in females. The apical third is orange, anteriorly suffused and the costal edge is posteriorly blackish, marked towards the apex with three irregular white or whitish dots. In males, there are sometimes grey marks along the dorsum towards one-fourth and the middle. There are two blackish streaks from about the tornus, acutely angulated inwards near the dorsum, then very oblique outwards, reaching two-thirds of the way across the wing, separated with whitish. Beyond these is a whitish terminal dot, followed by a black dot connected by a line with a black apical dot. The hindwings are light grey, thinly scaled, the apex tinged with orange and with a blackish apical dot.
