= Palumbina shivai =

Scientific classification
- Domain: Eukaryota
- Kingdom: Animalia
- Phylum: Arthropoda
- Class: Insecta
- Order: Lepidoptera
- Family: Gelechiidae
- Genus: Palumbina
- Species: P. shivai

Binomial name
- Palumbina shivai (Walia & Wadahawan, 2004)

Synonyms
- Thyrsostoma shivai Walia & Wadahawan, 2004

Species of moth

Palumbina shivai is a moth of the family Gelechiidae. It was described by Walia and Wadahawan in 2004. It is found in northern India.
