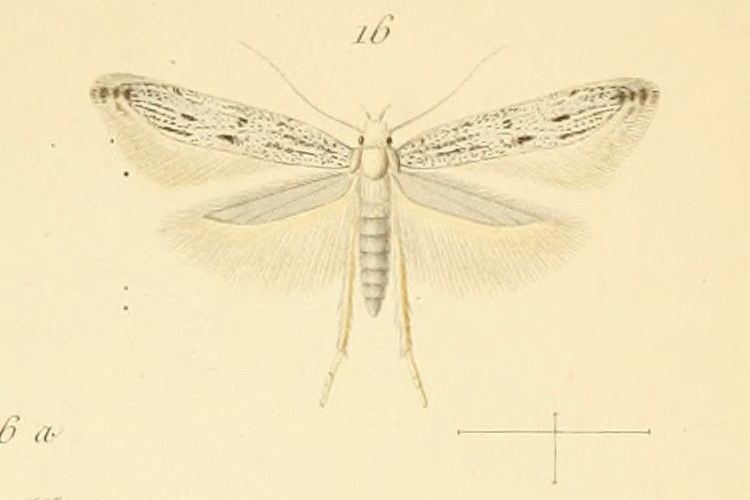

Scientific classification
- Domain: Eukaryota
- Kingdom: Animalia
- Phylum: Arthropoda
- Class: Insecta
- Order: Lepidoptera
- Family: Gelechiidae
- Genus: Thiotricha
- Species: T. coleella

Binomial name
- Thiotricha coleella (Constant, 1885)

Synonyms
- Ptocheuusa coleella Constant, 1885

= Thiotricha coleella =

Species of moth

Thiotricha coleella is a moth of the family Gelechiidae. It was described by Constant in 1885. It is found in the Alpes-Maritimes in southern France.
