= Thiotricha bullata =

Scientific classification
- Domain: Eukaryota
- Kingdom: Animalia
- Phylum: Arthropoda
- Class: Insecta
- Order: Lepidoptera
- Family: Gelechiidae
- Genus: Thiotricha
- Species: T. bullata

Binomial name
- Thiotricha bullata Meyrick, 1904

Species of moth

Thiotricha bullata is a moth of the family Gelechiidae. It was described by Edward Meyrick in 1904. It is found in Australia, where it has been recorded from New South Wales.

The wingspan is about 12 mm (0.47 in). The forewings are whitish, thinly sprinkled with dark grey and with a large roundish dark grey spot in the middle of the disc, and a smaller one at two-thirds. The hindwings are whitish grey.
