= Thiotricha trichoma =

Scientific classification
- Kingdom: Animalia
- Phylum: Arthropoda
- Clade: Pancrustacea
- Class: Insecta
- Order: Lepidoptera
- Family: Gelechiidae
- Genus: Thiotricha
- Species: T. trichoma

Binomial name
- Thiotricha trichoma (Caradja, 1920)

Synonyms
- Mystax trichoma Caradja, 1920; Polyhymno trichoma

Species of moth

Thiotricha trichoma is a moth of the family Gelechiidae. It was described by Aristide Caradja in 1920. It is found in the Russian Far East.
