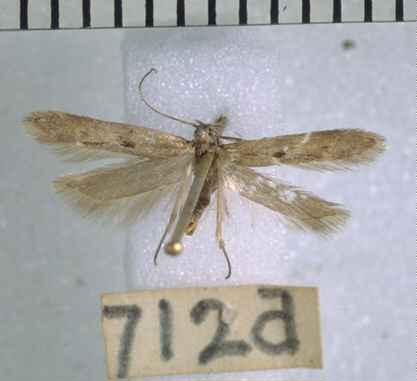
- male lectotype specimen

Scientific classification
- Kingdom: Animalia
- Phylum: Arthropoda
- Class: Insecta
- Order: Lepidoptera
- Family: Gelechiidae
- Genus: Thiotricha
- Species: T. oleariae

Binomial name
- Thiotricha oleariae Hudson, 1928

= Thiotricha oleariae =

Species of moth endemic to New Zealand

Thiotricha oleariae is a moth of the family Gelechiidae. It is endemic to in New Zealand, where it has been recorded from the central part of the North Island south down to Stewart Island. The species is found at altitudes of between sea-level up to 900 metres. The larvae live in a constructed case, are leaf miners and are active in November. The larval host species are within the genus Olearia. Adults are nocturnal and on the wing from November to March.

== Taxonomy ==
This species was first described by George Hudson in his publication, The butterflies and moths of New Zealand, in 1928 using a specimen collected by Stella Hudson at Days Bay in Wellington. Stella Hudson collected a larval specimen feeding on Olearia solandri and George Hudson reared it to maturity. The male lectotype is held at Te Papa. The lectotype specimen is held at Te Papa.

== Description ==
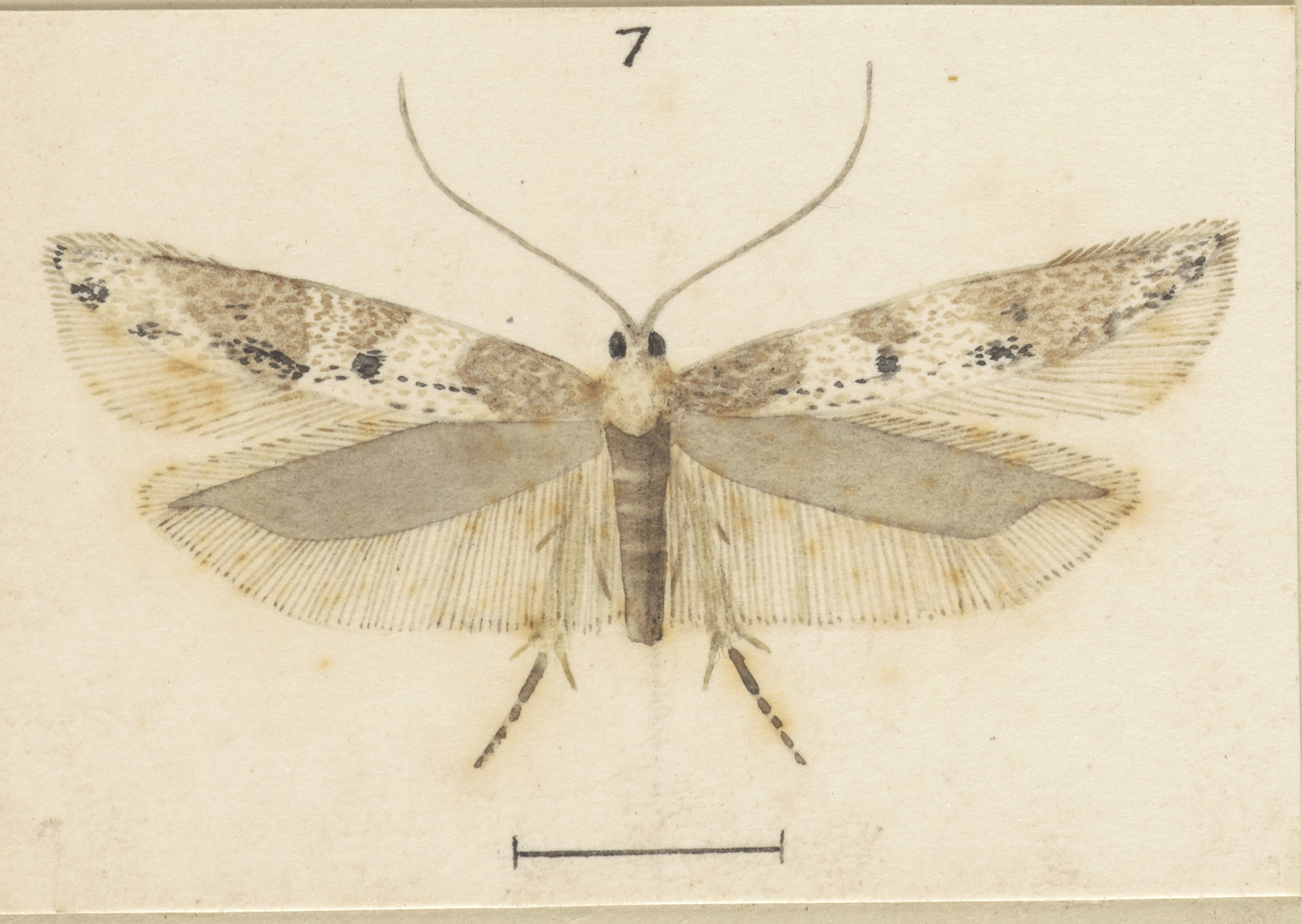
Illustration of adult T. oleariae by George Hudson

Larvae live in a constructed case.

Hudson described the larvae of this species as follows:

The enclosed larva is very stout greenish-brown, much wrinkled with the horny head, dorsal plate of second segment and legs blackish; minute prolegs are situated on segments 7-10. The last segment is horny with well developed anal prolegs which retain a firm hold on the case.

Hudson described the adult of the species as follows:

The expansion of the wings is slightly under 1/2 inch. The fore-wings are rather narrow, with the costa almost straight, the termen oblique and the dorsum nearly parallel with the costa; dull white, much sprinkled and clouded with pale brown on the basal fourth and on the costal region from about 1/3 to near the apex; there is a chain of black scales on the fold, terminating in a rather conspicuous black spot at about 1/3; clusters of black scales are usually present near the tornal region, in the middle of the termen, near the apex and sometimes in the disc. The hind-wings, which have the apex strongly produced, are dull greyish-ochreous; the cilia of all the wings are brownish-grey.

== Distribution ==
This species has been observed from the central part of the North Island south to Stewart Island. It is found at altitudes from sea-level up to 900 metres.

== Behaviour ==
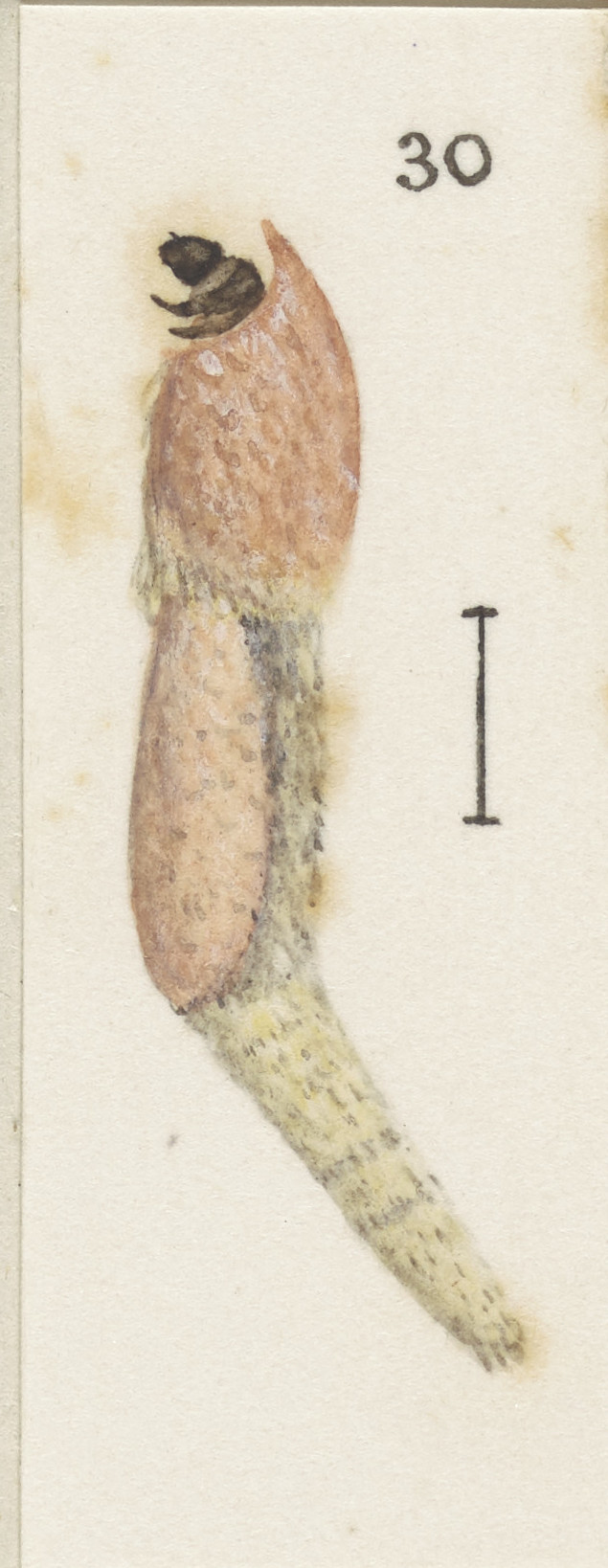
Larva & case

The larva of this species is active in November. It constructs a case approximately 1/4 inch in length. The posterior third of the case is strongly angled and is made up of three leaves. The angled portion of the case is the earlier formed portion, with the two subsequently formed parts of the case being more or less aligned. The adult of this species are nocturnal and are on the wing between November and March.

== Hosts ==
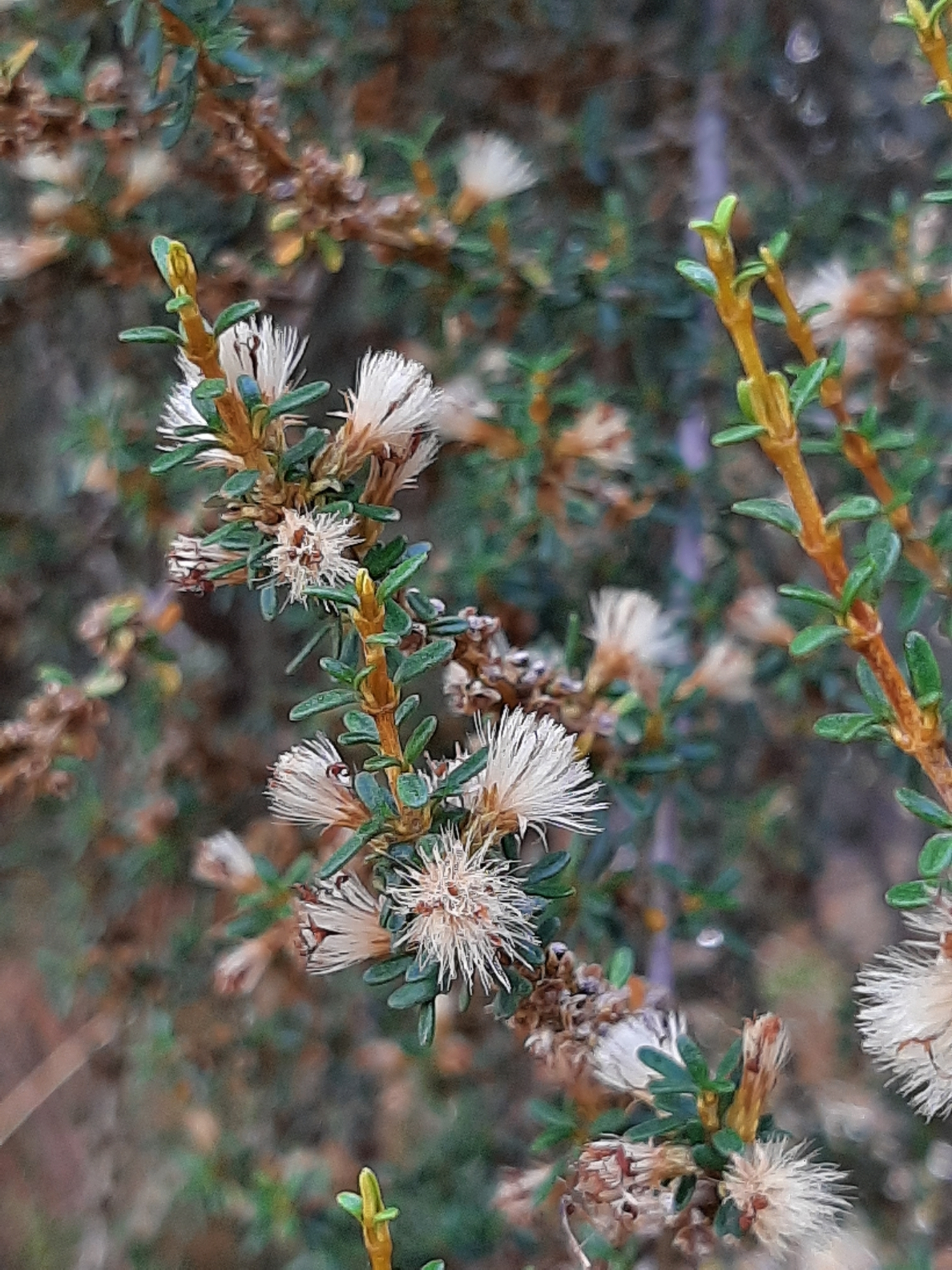
One of the larval host species, Olearia solandri.

The larvae feed on the foliage of Olearia species, including Olearia solandri from within their portable case. They mine and erode the leaves.
