= Thiotricha anarpastis =

Scientific classification
- Domain: Eukaryota
- Kingdom: Animalia
- Phylum: Arthropoda
- Class: Insecta
- Order: Lepidoptera
- Family: Gelechiidae
- Genus: Thiotricha
- Species: T. anarpastis

Binomial name
- Thiotricha anarpastis Meyrick, 1927

Species of moth

Thiotricha anarpastis is a moth of the family Gelechiidae. It was described by Edward Meyrick in 1927. It is found on Samoa.
