= Thiotricha delacma =

Scientific classification
- Domain: Eukaryota
- Kingdom: Animalia
- Phylum: Arthropoda
- Class: Insecta
- Order: Lepidoptera
- Family: Gelechiidae
- Genus: Thiotricha
- Species: T. delacma

Binomial name
- Thiotricha delacma Meyrick, 1923

Species of moth

Thiotricha delacma is a moth of the family Gelechiidae. It was described by Edward Meyrick in 1923. It is found in southern India.

The wingspan is 13–15 mm. The forewings are shining white, with faint brownish-ochreous tinge and with the extreme costal edge dark fuscous, becoming a dark brown streak on the apical third, towards the apex cut by an oblique wedge-shaped white mark, followed by two white dots edged black beneath, the last terminated by a black apical dot. There is a fuscous or brownish streak along the dorsum nearly from the base, becoming wider along the termen where it includes an oblique white streak before the tornus and a white mark or dot on the termen. The hindwings are grey.
