= Thiotricha scioplecta =

Scientific classification
- Domain: Eukaryota
- Kingdom: Animalia
- Phylum: Arthropoda
- Class: Insecta
- Order: Lepidoptera
- Family: Gelechiidae
- Genus: Thiotricha
- Species: T. scioplecta

Binomial name
- Thiotricha scioplecta Meyrick, 1918

Species of moth

Thiotricha scioplecta is a moth of the family Gelechiidae. It was described by Edward Meyrick in 1918. It is found in Assam, India.

The wingspan is about 14 mm. The forewings are pale glossy grey with an oblique triangular rather dark purplish-fuscous blotch extending on the dorsum from near the base to near the middle and reaching the fold. There is a dark purplish-fuscous streak just beneath the costa from one-third to near the apex, thick anteriorly and attenuated posteriorly. An oblique wedge-shaped dark purplish-fuscous mark is found from the costa at two-thirds running into this followed by violet-whitish strigula edged with dark fuscous. There is a pale streak edged with dark fuscous from the apex of this to the tornus, very acutely angled inwards on the fold. The apical area is ochreous, with a short violet-white dash terminating in the black apical dot. The hindwings are grey.
