= Thiotricha polyaula =

Scientific classification
- Domain: Eukaryota
- Kingdom: Animalia
- Phylum: Arthropoda
- Class: Insecta
- Order: Lepidoptera
- Family: Gelechiidae
- Genus: Thiotricha
- Species: T. polyaula

Binomial name
- Thiotricha polyaula Meyrick, 1918

Species of moth

Thiotricha polyaula is a moth of the family Gelechiidae. It was described by Edward Meyrick in 1918. It is found in Assam, India.

The wingspan is 12–13 mm. The forewings are rather dark brown with the markings ochreous white. There is a slender median streak from the base, branching at one-fourth into two lines, the upper running to five-sixths but more or less widely interrupted in the middle, the lower running to three-fifths. There is a narrow pointed streak below the fold from the base to one-third and short subdorsal and dorsal lines from the base, as well as a pointed costal streak on the basal third, sometimes partially obsolete. A suffused dark fuscous transverse spot is found from the dorsum before the middle, immediately followed by a white longitudinal streak beneath the fold to the tornus and there is a fine costal line from before the middle, becoming slightly divergent and terminated by a very oblique strigula at four-fifths. From beneath the apex of this a line to the tornus, acutely angulated inwards above the fold. Just beyond these markings is a fine obtusely-angulated blue-leaden-metallic transverse line and there are three indistinct marks on the costa towards the apex, the last edging a black apical dot preceded beneath by a minute blue-leaden-metallic dot. The hindwings are grey, paler in the disc anteriorly.
