= Palumbina tanyrrhina =

Scientific classification
- Domain: Eukaryota
- Kingdom: Animalia
- Phylum: Arthropoda
- Class: Insecta
- Order: Lepidoptera
- Family: Gelechiidae
- Genus: Palumbina
- Species: P. tanyrrhina

Binomial name
- Palumbina tanyrrhina (Meyrick, 1921)

Synonyms
- Thyrsostoma tanyrrhina Meyrick, 1921

Species of moth

Palumbina tanyrrhina is a moth of the family Gelechiidae. It was described by Edward Meyrick in 1921. It is found on Java in Indonesia.

The wingspan is 11–12 mm. The forewings are light violet grey in males, darker in females. The markings are ochreous white. There is a narrow irregular outwards-oblique fascia from the dorsum before the middle, hardly reaching the costa, tending to project on each side on the fold. An irregular-edged inverted-triangular spot is found on the tornus, with a fine dash above it. There is also a small cloudy spot on the termen near the apex. The hindwings are ochreous grey whitish in males and grey in females.
