= Thiotricha majorella =

Scientific classification
- Domain: Eukaryota
- Kingdom: Animalia
- Phylum: Arthropoda
- Class: Insecta
- Order: Lepidoptera
- Family: Gelechiidae
- Genus: Thiotricha
- Species: T. majorella

Binomial name
- Thiotricha majorella (Rebel, 1910)

Synonyms
- Ptocheuusa majorella Rebel, 1910

Species of moth

Thiotricha majorella is a moth of the family Gelechiidae. It was described by Hans Rebel in 1910. It is found in Italy, Croatia, Bosnia and Herzegovina, Serbia, Bulgaria and Greece.

The wingspan is about 12.5 mm. The forewings are shining white, with ill-defined brownish scales and with a brownish longitudinal streak from the base to the end of the middle cell, leaving the inner margin white. The hindwings are whitish-grey.
