= Thiotricha paraconta =

Scientific classification
- Domain: Eukaryota
- Kingdom: Animalia
- Phylum: Arthropoda
- Class: Insecta
- Order: Lepidoptera
- Family: Gelechiidae
- Genus: Thiotricha
- Species: T. paraconta

Binomial name
- Thiotricha paraconta Meyrick, 1904

Species of moth

Thiotricha paraconta is a moth of the family Gelechiidae. It was described by Edward Meyrick in 1904. It is found in Australia, where it has been recorded from New South Wales.

The wingspan is about 11 mm (0.43 in). The forewings are shining white, with a faint ochreous tinge and with the costal edge dark fuscous towards the base. There is a dark fuscous dorsal streak from one-fourth to before the tornus, then continued very obliquely upwards, reaching halfway across the wing. There are two rather suffused oblique dark fuscous streaks from the costa towards the apex and a black apical dot. The hindwings are grey.
