= Thiotricha operaria =

Scientific classification
- Domain: Eukaryota
- Kingdom: Animalia
- Phylum: Arthropoda
- Class: Insecta
- Order: Lepidoptera
- Family: Gelechiidae
- Genus: Thiotricha
- Species: T. operaria

Binomial name
- Thiotricha operaria Meyrick, 1918

Synonyms
- Palumbina operaria (Meyrick, 1918)

Species of moth

Thiotricha operaria is a moth of the family Gelechiidae. It was described by Edward Meyrick in 1918. It is found in Assam, India.

The wingspan is 13–14 mm. The forewings are light grey, obscurely darker streaked longitudinally and with the costal edge blackish towards the base. There is a blackish streak along the fold towards the base and an inwardly oblique blackish transverse line at one-third, dentate outwards beneath the costa, inwards in the disc, very sharply outwards on the fold, and inwards above the dorsum, strongly edged posteriorly with white. There are three variable irregular blackish spots beneath the middle of the disc, on the tornus, and before the apex respectively, separated by white suffusion. The apex is whitish. The hindwings are grey.
