= Palumbina glaucitis =

Scientific classification
- Domain: Eukaryota
- Kingdom: Animalia
- Phylum: Arthropoda
- Class: Insecta
- Order: Lepidoptera
- Family: Gelechiidae
- Genus: Palumbina
- Species: P. glaucitis

Binomial name
- Palumbina glaucitis (Meyrick, 1907)

Synonyms
- Thyrsostoma glaucitis Meyrick, 1907

Species of moth

Palumbina glaucitis is a moth of the family Gelechiidae. It was described by Edward Meyrick in 1907. It is found in southern India and Sri Lanka.

The wingspan is 12–13 mm. The forewings are grey with pale metallic-blue reflections and a narrow inwardly oblique whitish fascia at one-third. There is also an ill-defined irregular whitish discal spot at three-fifths. The hindwings are grey, towards the base paler and ochreous tinged.
