= Thiotricha wollastoni =

Scientific classification
- Domain: Eukaryota
- Kingdom: Animalia
- Phylum: Arthropoda
- Class: Insecta
- Order: Lepidoptera
- Family: Gelechiidae
- Genus: Thiotricha
- Species: T. wollastoni

Binomial name
- Thiotricha wollastoni (Walsingham, 1894)

Synonyms
- Anacampsis wollastoni Walsingham, 1894

Species of moth

Thiotricha wollastoni is a moth of the family Gelechiidae. It was described by Thomas de Grey, 6th Baron Walsingham, in 1894. It is found on Madeira.

The wingspan is 14–15 mm. The forewings are brown, with a narrow creamy-white streak along the dorsal margin extending to the apex and including the cilia, but interrupted beyond the anal angle by two oblique brown streaks, the first along the apical margin, the second, shorter, in the cilia. Beneath the apex a slight darkish line in the base of the cilia around the apex is preceded by a faint indication of a pale, very oblique line, commencing at the anterior extremity of the costal cilia and terminating below the apex of the wing. The hindwings are shining, pale grey.
