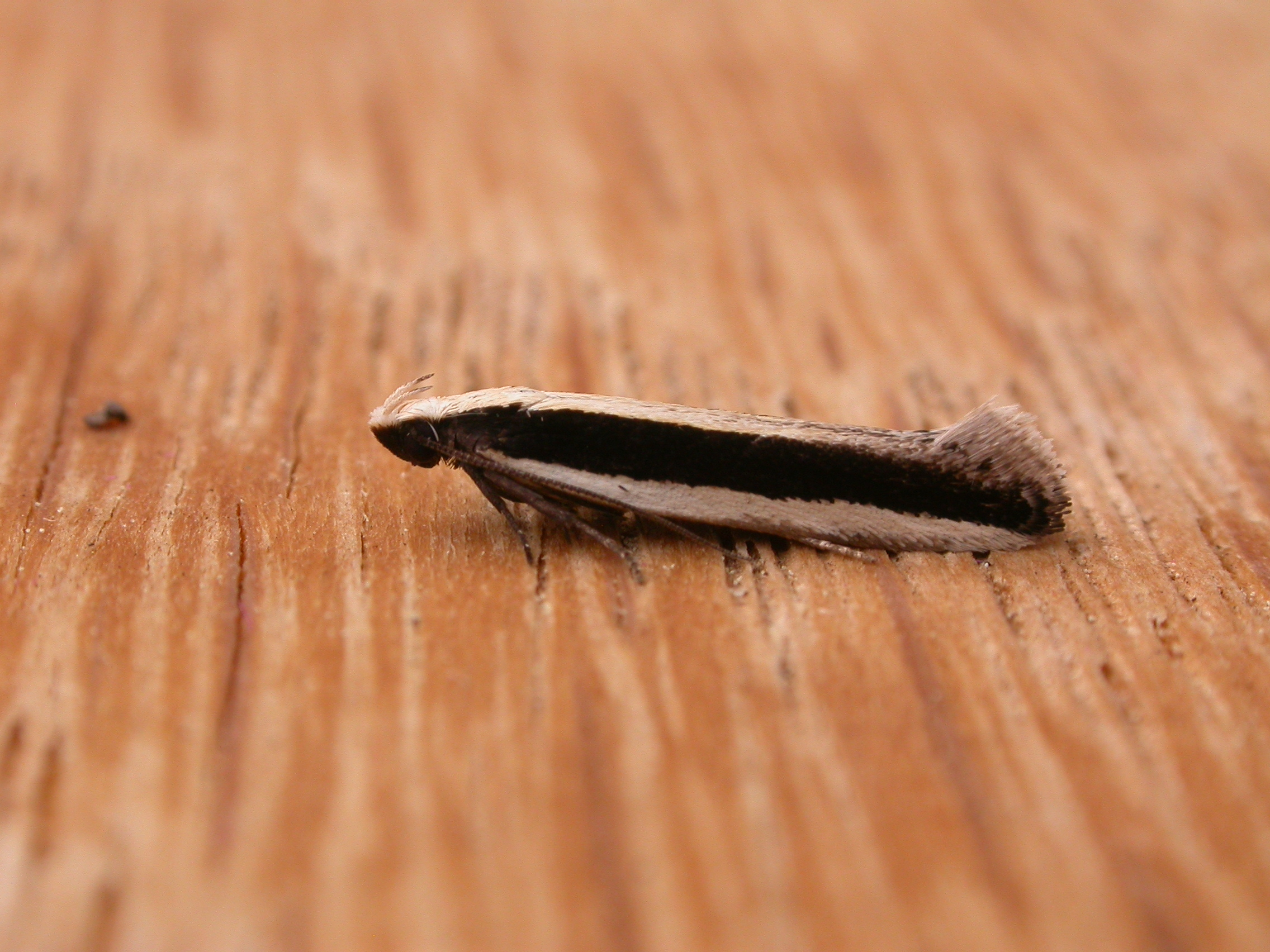
- Macrenches clerica

Scientific classification
- Kingdom: Animalia
- Phylum: Arthropoda
- Clade: Pancrustacea
- Class: Insecta
- Order: Lepidoptera
- Family: Gelechiidae
- Subfamily: Thiotrichinae; Karsholt, Mutanen, Lee & Kaila, 2013

= Thiotrichinae =

Subfamily of moths

Thiotrichinae is a subfamily of moths in the family Gelechiidae.

== Genera ==
- Macrenches Meyrick, 1904
- Palumbina Rondani, 1876
- Polyhymno Chambers, 1874
- Thiotricha Meyrick, 1886
