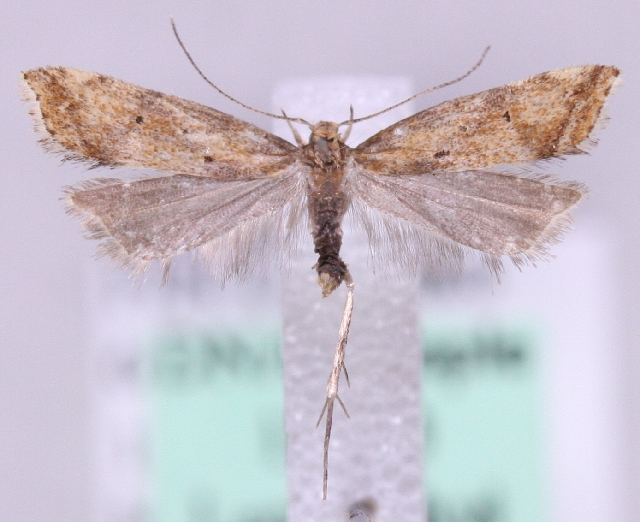

Scientific classification
- Kingdom: Animalia
- Phylum: Arthropoda
- Clade: Pancrustacea
- Class: Insecta
- Order: Lepidoptera
- Family: Gelechiidae
- Subfamily: Dichomeridinae
- Genus: Brachmia; Hübner, 1825

Species
- Many, see text

Synonyms
- See text

= Brachmia =

Genus of moths

Brachmia is a genus of the twirler moth family (Gelechiidae). Among these, it is mostly placed in the subfamily Dichomeridinae.

== Taxonomy ==
Other authors have used it as type genus of a distinct subfamily Brachmiinae. However, the "Brachmiinae" are considered an ill-defined assemblage of twirler moths whose relationships are not yet sufficiently determined, and the present genus is consequently sometimes placed incertae sedis within the Gelechiidae.

== Species ==
The species of Brachmia are:

- Brachmia alienella (Walker, 1864)
- Brachmia amphisticta Meyrick, 1914
- Brachmia anisopa (Meyrick, 1918)
- Brachmia antichroa Meyrick, 1918
- Brachmia apricata Meyrick, 1913
- Brachmia autonoma Meyrick, 1910
- Brachmia ballotellus (Amsel, 1935)
- Brachmia blandella (Fabricius, 1798)
- Brachmia brunnea (Bradley, 1961)
- Brachmia brunneolineata Legrand, 1966
- Brachmia carphodes (Meyrick, 1908)
- Brachmia cenchritis Meyrick, 1911
- Brachmia circumfusa Meyrick, 1922
- Brachmia consummata Meyrick, 1923
- Brachmia craterospila Meyrick, 1923
- Brachmia custos Meyrick, 1911
- Brachmia deltopis Meyrick, 1920
- Brachmia dilutiterminella (Gerasimov, 1930)
- Brachmia dimidiella (Denis & Schiffermüller, 1775)
- Brachmia ditemenitis Meyrick, 1934
- Brachmia dolosa Meyrick, 1911
- Brachmia dryotyphla Meyrick, 1937
- Brachmia episticta (Meyrick, 1905)
- Brachmia elaeophanes Meyrick, 1930
- Brachmia fuscogramma Janse, 1960
- Brachmia hedemanni Caradja, 1920
- Brachmia infixa Meyrick, 1938
- Brachmia infuscatella Rebel, 1940
- Brachmia inornatella (Douglas, 1850)
- Brachmia inspersa Meyrick, 1921
- Brachmia insuavis Meyrick, 1914
- Brachmia insulsa Meyrick, 1914
- Brachmia ioplaca Meyrick, 1934
- Brachmia japonicella (Zeller, 1877)
- Brachmia juridica Meyrick, 1911
- Brachmia leucopla Meyrick, 1938
- Brachmia leucospora Meyrick, 1938
- Brachmia liberta Meyrick, 1926
- Brachmia melicephala Meyrick, 1918
- Brachmia metoeca (Meyrick, 1908)
- Brachmia monotona Caradja, 1927
- Brachmia murinula Turati, 1930
- Brachmia neuroplecta Meyrick, 1938
- Brachmia obtrectata Meyrick, 1922
- Brachmia officiosa Meyrick, 1918
- Brachmia opaca Meyrick, 1927
- Brachmia orthomastix Meyrick, 1931
- Brachmia perumbrata Meyrick, 1918
- Brachmia philochersa Meyrick, 1938
- Brachmia philodema Meyrick, 1938
- Brachmia planicola Meyrick, 1932
- Brachmia procursella Rebel, 1903
- Brachmia ptochodryas Meyrick, 1923
- Brachmia purificata (Meyrick, 1931)
- Brachmia quassata Meyrick, 1930
- Brachmia radiosella (Erschoff, 1874)
- Brachmia resoluta Meyrick, 1918
- Brachmia sigillatrix Meyrick, 1910
- Brachmia sitiens Meyrick, 1918
- Brachmia stactopis Meyrick, 1931
- Brachmia strigosa Meyrick, 1910
- Brachmia subsignata Diakonoff, 1954
- Brachmia superans (Meyrick, 1926)
- Brachmia syntonopis Meyrick, 1923
- Brachmia tepidata Meyrick, 1922
- Brachmia tholeromicta Meyrick, 1931
- Brachmia torva Meyrick, 1914
- Brachmia triophthalma (Meyrick, 1910)
- Brachmia vecors Meyrick, 1918
- Brachmia velitaris Meyrick, 1913
- Brachmia xeronoma Meyrick, 1935

== Status unknown ==
- Brachmia robustella Rebel, 1910, described from Herzegovina

== Former species ==
- Brachmia ceramochroa (Turner, 1919)
- Brachmia convolvuli Walsingham, 1907
- Brachmia craticula Meyrick, 1921
- Brachmia fiscinata Meyrick, 1918
- Brachmia graphicodes Meyrick, 1914
- Brachmia hemiopa Meyrick, 1921
- Brachmia malacogramma Meyrick, 1909
- Brachmia musicopa Meyrick, 1908
- Brachmia nesidias Meyrick, 1911
- Brachmia neurograpta Meyrick, 1921
- Brachmia obfuscata Meyrick, 1921
- Brachmia pantheropa Meyrick, 1913
- Brachmia septella (Zeller, 1852)
- Brachmia spilopis Meyrick, 1927
- Brachmia trinervis (Meyrick, 1904)
- Brachmia verberata Meyrick, 1911

== Synonyms ==
Invalid scientific names (junior synonyms and others) of Brachmia are:

- Apethistis Meyrick, 1908
- Aulacomima Meyrick, 1904
- Braclunia Stephens, 1834 (unjustified emendation)
- Brahmia (lapsus)
- Cerathophora (lapsus)
- Ceratophora Heinemann, [1870] (non Gray, [1825]: preoccupied)
- Cladodes Heinemann, 1870 (non Solier, 1849: preoccupied)
- Eudodacles Snellen van Vollenhoven, 1889
