= Brachmia deltopis =

Scientific classification
- Domain: Eukaryota
- Kingdom: Animalia
- Phylum: Arthropoda
- Class: Insecta
- Order: Lepidoptera
- Family: Gelechiidae
- Genus: Brachmia
- Species: B. deltopis

Binomial name
- Brachmia deltopis Meyrick, 1920

Species of moth

Brachmia deltopis is a moth in the family Gelechiidae. It was described by Edward Meyrick in 1920. It is found in Kenya and Uganda.

The larvae feed on Hibiscus micranthus.
