= Brachmia dryotyphla =

Scientific classification
- Domain: Eukaryota
- Kingdom: Animalia
- Phylum: Arthropoda
- Class: Insecta
- Order: Lepidoptera
- Family: Gelechiidae
- Genus: Brachmia
- Species: B. dryotyphla

Binomial name
- Brachmia dryotyphla Meyrick, 1937

Species of moth

Brachmia dryotyphla is a moth in the family Gelechiidae. It was described by Edward Meyrick in 1937. It is found in Mumbai, India.
