= Brachmia perumbrata =

Scientific classification
- Domain: Eukaryota
- Kingdom: Animalia
- Phylum: Arthropoda
- Class: Insecta
- Order: Lepidoptera
- Family: Gelechiidae
- Genus: Brachmia
- Species: B. perumbrata

Binomial name
- Brachmia perumbrata Meyrick, 1918

Species of moth

Brachmia perumbrata is a moth in the family Gelechiidae. It was described by Edward Meyrick in 1918. It is found in the Bengal region of what was then British India.

The wingspan is about 18 mm. The forewings are pale fuscous, with indistinct streaks of dark fuscous irroration (speckles) in the disc and between the veins. The hindwings are whitish fuscous.
