= Brachmia murinula =

Scientific classification
- Domain: Eukaryota
- Kingdom: Animalia
- Phylum: Arthropoda
- Class: Insecta
- Order: Lepidoptera
- Family: Gelechiidae
- Genus: Brachmia
- Species: B. murinula

Binomial name
- Brachmia murinula Turati, 1930

Species of moth

Brachmia murinula is a moth in the family Gelechiidae. It was described by Turati in 1930. It is found in Libya.
