= Brachmia brunneolineata =

Scientific classification
- Domain: Eukaryota
- Kingdom: Animalia
- Phylum: Arthropoda
- Class: Insecta
- Order: Lepidoptera
- Family: Gelechiidae
- Genus: Brachmia
- Species: B. brunneolineata

Binomial name
- Brachmia brunneolineata Legrand, 1966

Species of moth

Brachmia brunneolineata is a moth in the family Gelechiidae. It was described by Henry Legrand in 1966. It is found on the Seychelles, where it has been recorded from Mahé and Silhouette.

The larvae feed on Calophyllum inophyllum.
