= Brachmia insulsa =

Scientific classification
- Domain: Eukaryota
- Kingdom: Animalia
- Phylum: Arthropoda
- Class: Insecta
- Order: Lepidoptera
- Family: Gelechiidae
- Genus: Brachmia
- Species: B. insulsa

Binomial name
- Brachmia insulsa Meyrick, 1914

Synonyms
- Apethistis insulsa (Meyrick, 1914)

Species of moth

Brachmia insulsa is a moth in the family Gelechiidae. It was described by Edward Meyrick in 1914. It is found in the Bengal region of what was then British India and the United Arab Emirates.

The wingspan is 12–16 mm. The forewings are light greyish ochreous with the stigmata dark fuscous, the plical slightly before the first discal. There are some cloudy dark-fuscous dots around the apex and termen, sometimes almost obsolete. The hindwings are ochreous-grey whitish.
