= Brachmia subsignata =

Scientific classification
- Kingdom: Animalia
- Phylum: Arthropoda
- Class: Insecta
- Order: Lepidoptera
- Family: Gelechiidae
- Genus: Brachmia
- Species: B. subsignata

Binomial name
- Brachmia subsignata Diakonoff, 1954

Species of moth

Brachmia subsignata is a moth in the family Gelechiidae. It was described by Alexey Diakonoff in 1954. It is found in New Guinea.
