= Brachmia custos =

Scientific classification
- Domain: Eukaryota
- Kingdom: Animalia
- Phylum: Arthropoda
- Class: Insecta
- Order: Lepidoptera
- Family: Gelechiidae
- Genus: Brachmia
- Species: B. custos

Binomial name
- Brachmia custos Meyrick, 1911

Species of moth

Brachmia custos is a moth in the family Gelechiidae. It was described by Edward Meyrick in 1911. It is found in southern India.

The wingspan is about 19 mm. The forewings are dull ochreous brown with a basal fascia of rather dark fuscous suffusion and with the costa infuscated from this to beyond the middle. There is a broad fascia of rather dark fuscous suffusion beyond the middle, the second discal stigma forming a small round dark fuscous spot on the inner edge of this. The hindwings are grey.
