= Brachmia anisopa =

Scientific classification
- Kingdom: Animalia
- Phylum: Arthropoda
- Class: Insecta
- Order: Lepidoptera
- Family: Gelechiidae
- Genus: Brachmia
- Species: B. anisopa

Binomial name
- Brachmia anisopa (Meyrick, 1918)

Synonyms
- Anacampsis anisopa Meyrick, 1918

Species of moth

Brachmia anisopa is a moth in the family Gelechiidae. It was described by Edward Meyrick in 1918. It is found in Colombia.

== Appearance ==
The wingspan is about 15 mm. The forewings are dark purplish grey with two ochreous-brown discal spots finely edged with blackish, representing the stigmata, the first before the middle, larger, transverse oval, connected with the dorsum by a subquadrate spot of blackish suffusion edged laterally with whitish, the second at three-fifths, round, partially edged finely whitish.

There is a small whitish spot on the costa at four-fifths, with indications of a transverse series of minute whitish dots beneath it. There is also a marginal series of minute blackish dots around the apex and termen, edged anteriorly by minute white dots. The hindwings are grey.
