= Brachmia dolosa =

Scientific classification
- Domain: Eukaryota
- Kingdom: Animalia
- Phylum: Arthropoda
- Class: Insecta
- Order: Lepidoptera
- Family: Gelechiidae
- Genus: Brachmia
- Species: B. dolosa

Binomial name
- Brachmia dolosa Meyrick, 1911

Synonyms
- Apethistis dolosa (Meyrick, 1911)

Species of moth

Brachmia dolosa is a moth in the family Gelechiidae. It was described by Edward Meyrick in 1911. It is found in Sri Lanka.

The wingspan is 10–12 mm. The forewings are whitish ochreous, more or less sprinkled with brownish and dark fuscous. The stigmata is formed of blackish irroration (speckles), the plical rather obliquely before the first discal. There is a small transverse spot of blackish irroration on the dorsum somewhat before the second discal and an acutely angulated series of cloudy black dots close before the posterior third of the costa and termen. The hindwings are light grey.
