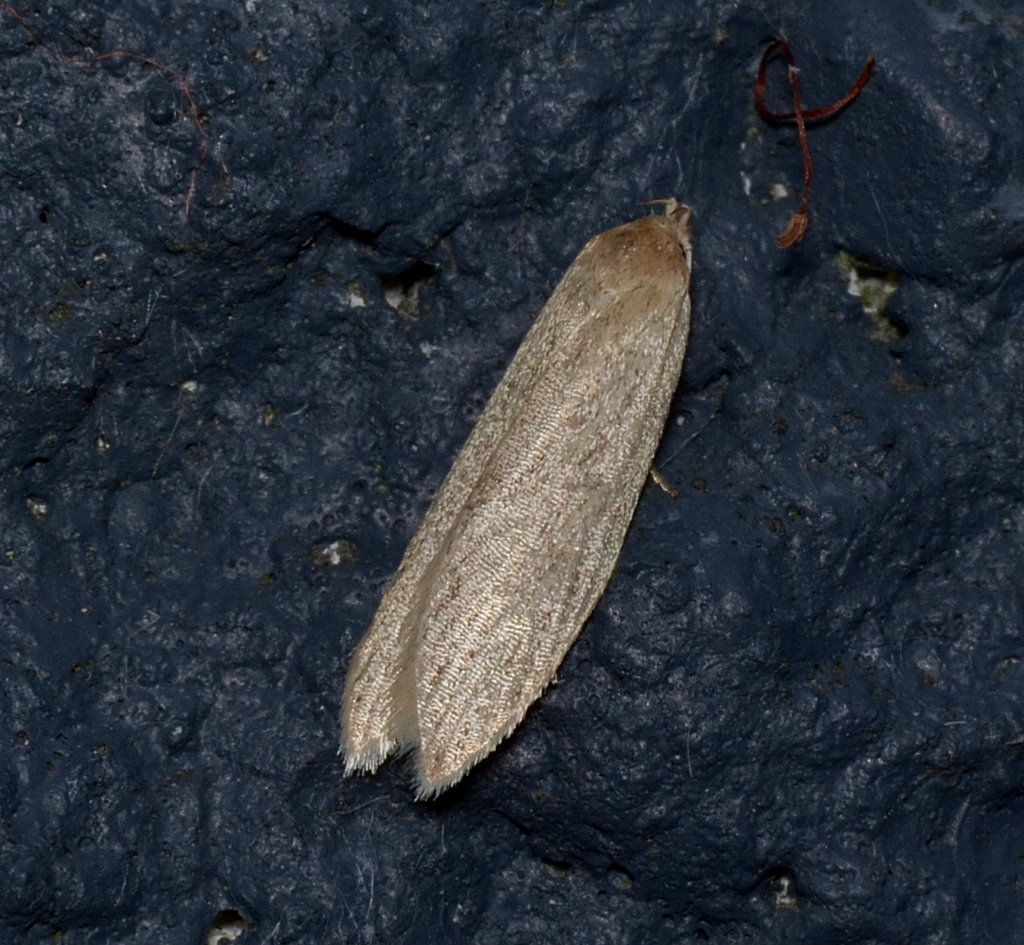

Scientific classification
- Kingdom: Animalia
- Phylum: Arthropoda
- Class: Insecta
- Order: Lepidoptera
- Family: Gelechiidae
- Genus: Scieropepla
- Species: S. typhicola

Binomial name
- Scieropepla typhicola Meyrick, 1885

Synonyms
- Scieropepla typicola

= Scieropepla typhicola =

Species of moth

Scieropepla typhicola is a moth of the family Oecophoridae. It was described by Edward Meyrick in 1885. It is found in Australia (the Australian Capital Territory, New South Wales and Queensland) and New Zealand.

The larvae bore in the flower heads of Typha species (including Typha angustifolia).
