= Brachmia strigosa =

Scientific classification
- Domain: Eukaryota
- Kingdom: Animalia
- Phylum: Arthropoda
- Class: Insecta
- Order: Lepidoptera
- Family: Gelechiidae
- Genus: Brachmia
- Species: B. strigosa

Binomial name
- Brachmia strigosa Meyrick, 1910

Species of moth

Brachmia strigosa is a moth in the family Gelechiidae. It was described by Edward Meyrick in 1910. It is found on Borneo.

The wingspan is 9–11 mm. The forewings are pale yellow ochreous, sprinkled with ferruginous points, especially on the dorsal half. There is a black dot near the base towards the costa, sometimes one on the base of the fold, and a small spot on the base of the dorsum. The stigmata is black, the plical somewhat obliquely before the first discal. There is a cloudy blackish dot on the dorsum beneath the second discal and a row of submarginal black dots around the posterior half of the costa and termen. The hindwings are grey.
