= Brachmia antichroa =

Scientific classification
- Domain: Eukaryota
- Kingdom: Animalia
- Phylum: Arthropoda
- Class: Insecta
- Order: Lepidoptera
- Family: Gelechiidae
- Genus: Brachmia
- Species: B. antichroa

Binomial name
- Brachmia antichroa Meyrick, 1918

Species of moth

Brachmia antichroa is a moth in the family Gelechiidae. It was described by Edward Meyrick in 1918. It is found in Sri Lanka.

The wingspan is about 20 mm. The forewings are brownish ochreous and the hindwings are grey.
