= Brachmia superans =

Scientific classification
- Domain: Eukaryota
- Kingdom: Animalia
- Phylum: Arthropoda
- Class: Insecta
- Order: Lepidoptera
- Family: Gelechiidae
- Genus: Brachmia
- Species: B. superans

Binomial name
- Brachmia superans (Meyrick, 1926)

Synonyms
- Apethistis superans Meyrick, 1926

Species of moth

Brachmia superans is a moth in the family Gelechiidae. It was described by Edward Meyrick in 1926. It is found in north-eastern India.

The wingspan is 19–20 mm. The forewings are fuscous, the bases of the scales tinged with whitish. The stigmata is small, blackish, the plical somewhat obliquely before the first discal and beneath the second discal is a transverse streak of blackish irroration (speckles) from the dorsum not reaching it. Beyond the cell is some scattered blackish irroration obscurely indicating a curved transverse band. There is also a submarginal series of rather large dots of blackish irroration around the posterior fourth of the costa and termen. The hindwings are light grey.
