= Brachmia syntonopis =

Scientific classification
- Domain: Eukaryota
- Kingdom: Animalia
- Phylum: Arthropoda
- Class: Insecta
- Order: Lepidoptera
- Family: Gelechiidae
- Genus: Brachmia
- Species: B. syntonopis

Binomial name
- Brachmia syntonopis Meyrick, 1923

Species of moth

Brachmia syntonopis is a moth in the family Gelechiidae. It was described by Edward Meyrick in 1923. It is found in Mumbai, India.

The wingspan is about 14 mm. The forewings are light ochreous with blackish markings, partly with raised scales. There is a spot above the base of the dorsum, a slender streak along the basal half of the costa and an oblique fascia from the base of the costa to the fold, terminating in two lobes representing the plical and the first discal stigmata, the former somewhat anterior. There is a posterior projection from the fascia towards the costa and a rather large irregular spot on the middle of the costa, as well as an excurved-crescentic spot from the dorsum before the tornus, touching a broad transverse fascia from the costa at three-fourths, not reaching the tornus. There is also an irregular interrupted streak along the termen. The hindwings are grey.
