= Brachmia brunnea =

Scientific classification
- Domain: Eukaryota
- Kingdom: Animalia
- Phylum: Arthropoda
- Class: Insecta
- Order: Lepidoptera
- Family: Gelechiidae
- Genus: Brachmia
- Species: B. brunnea

Binomial name
- Brachmia brunnea (Bradley, 1961)

Synonyms
- Apethistis brunnea Bradley, 1961

Species of moth

Brachmia brunnea is a moth in the family Gelechiidae. It was described by John David Bradley in 1961. It is found on Guadalcanal.

The wingspan is 8–9 mm.
