= Brachmia fuscogramma =

Scientific classification
- Domain: Eukaryota
- Kingdom: Animalia
- Phylum: Arthropoda
- Class: Insecta
- Order: Lepidoptera
- Family: Gelechiidae
- Genus: Brachmia
- Species: B. fuscogramma

Binomial name
- Brachmia fuscogramma Janse, 1960

Species of moth

Brachmia fuscogramma is a moth in the family Gelechiidae. It was described by Anthonie Johannes Theodorus Janse in 1960. It is found in Réunion, South Africa and Zimbabwe.
