= Brachmia leucospora =

Scientific classification
- Kingdom: Animalia
- Phylum: Arthropoda
- Class: Insecta
- Order: Lepidoptera
- Family: Gelechiidae
- Genus: Brachmia
- Species: B. leucospora

Binomial name
- Brachmia leucospora Meyrick, 1938

Species of moth

Brachmia leucospora is a moth in the family Gelechiidae. It was described by Edward Meyrick in 1938. It is found in the Democratic Republic of Congo (North Kivu).
