= Brachmia cenchritis =

Scientific classification
- Kingdom: Animalia
- Phylum: Arthropoda
- Clade: Pancrustacea
- Class: Insecta
- Order: Lepidoptera
- Family: Gelechiidae
- Genus: Brachmia
- Species: B. cenchritis

Binomial name
- Brachmia cenchritis Meyrick, 1911

Species of moth

Brachmia cenchritis is a moth in the family Gelechiidae. It was described by Edward Meyrick in 1911. It is found in Assam, India.

The wingspan of B. cenchritis is about 16 mm. The forewings are off-white, irregularly strewn with brown scales with black tips. The stigmata are represented by clusters of similar scales, the first discal being round and the second being large and roundish, with the plical elongate somewhat before the first discal. There are four small spots of similar scales on the posterior half of the costa, and a suffused streak close before the termen. The hindwings are off-white, mixed with grey scales, especially towards the apex.
