= Brachmia episticta =

Scientific classification
- Domain: Eukaryota
- Kingdom: Animalia
- Phylum: Arthropoda
- Class: Insecta
- Order: Lepidoptera
- Family: Gelechiidae
- Genus: Brachmia
- Species: B. episticta

Binomial name
- Brachmia episticta (Meyrick, 1905)

Synonyms
- Torodora episticta Meyrick, 1905

Species of moth

Brachmia episticta is a moth in the family Gelechiidae. It was described by Edward Meyrick in 1905. It is found in Sri Lanka.

The wingspan is about 18 mm. The forewings are whitish ochreous, with a few scattered grey and blackish scales and a black dot on the base of the costa, and one beneath the costa near the base, as well as a dark grey dorsal dot near the base. The stigmata is rather large, blackish, the plical rather beyond the first discal and there is an almost marginal series of undefined blackish dots beneath the posterior half of the costa and around the termen. The hindwings are ochreous whitish.
