= Brachmia sigillatrix =

Scientific classification
- Domain: Eukaryota
- Kingdom: Animalia
- Phylum: Arthropoda
- Class: Insecta
- Order: Lepidoptera
- Family: Gelechiidae
- Genus: Brachmia
- Species: B. sigillatrix

Binomial name
- Brachmia sigillatrix Meyrick, 1910

Species of moth

Brachmia sigillatrix is a moth in the family Gelechiidae. It was described by Edward Meyrick in 1910. It is found in southern India.

The wingspan is 11–12 mm. The forewings are deep ochreous yellow, irregularly mixed with light brown suffusion. The stigmata is black, edged with white, the plical obliquely before the first discal. The hindwings are ochreous-whitish.
