= Brachmia vecors =

Scientific classification
- Domain: Eukaryota
- Kingdom: Animalia
- Phylum: Arthropoda
- Class: Insecta
- Order: Lepidoptera
- Family: Gelechiidae
- Genus: Brachmia
- Species: B. vecors

Binomial name
- Brachmia vecors Meyrick, 1918

Species of moth

Brachmia vecors is a moth in the family Gelechiidae. It was described by Edward Meyrick in 1918. It is found in southern India.

The wingspan is 13–16 mm. The forewings are fuscous. The stigmata is dark fuscous (in females cloudy), with the plical beneath or hardly before the first discal. There is a small indistinct spot of darker suffusion on the dorsum before the tornus. The hindwings are grey.
