= Brachmia purificata =

Scientific classification
- Domain: Eukaryota
- Kingdom: Animalia
- Phylum: Arthropoda
- Class: Insecta
- Order: Lepidoptera
- Family: Gelechiidae
- Genus: Brachmia
- Species: B. purificata

Binomial name
- Brachmia purificata (Meyrick, 1931)

Synonyms
- Apethistis purificata Meyrick, 1931

Species of moth

Brachmia purificata is a moth in the family Gelechiidae. It was described by Edward Meyrick in 1931. It is found in Sikkim, India.
