= Brachmia neuroplecta =

Scientific classification
- Domain: Eukaryota
- Kingdom: Animalia
- Phylum: Arthropoda
- Class: Insecta
- Order: Lepidoptera
- Family: Gelechiidae
- Genus: Brachmia
- Species: B. neuroplecta

Binomial name
- Brachmia neuroplecta Meyrick, 1938

Species of moth

Brachmia neuroplecta is a moth in the family Gelechiidae. It was described by Edward Meyrick in 1938. It is found in the former Orientale Province of the Democratic Republic of the Congo.
