= Brachmia radiosella =

Scientific classification
- Domain: Eukaryota
- Kingdom: Animalia
- Phylum: Arthropoda
- Class: Insecta
- Order: Lepidoptera
- Family: Gelechiidae
- Genus: Brachmia
- Species: B. radiosella

Binomial name
- Brachmia radiosella (Erschoff, 1874)

Synonyms
- Ceratophora radiosella Erschoff, 1874

Species of moth

Brachmia radiosella is a moth in the family Gelechiidae. It was described by Nikolay Grigoryevich Erschoff in 1874. It is found in Turkestan.
