= Brachmia orthomastix =

Scientific classification
- Domain: Eukaryota
- Kingdom: Animalia
- Phylum: Arthropoda
- Class: Insecta
- Order: Lepidoptera
- Family: Gelechiidae
- Genus: Brachmia
- Species: B. orthomastix

Binomial name
- Brachmia orthomastix Meyrick, 1931

Species of moth

Brachmia orthomastix is a moth in the family Gelechiidae. It was described by Edward Meyrick in 1931. It is found in Kenya.
