= Brachmia philodema =

Scientific classification
- Domain: Eukaryota
- Kingdom: Animalia
- Phylum: Arthropoda
- Class: Insecta
- Order: Lepidoptera
- Family: Gelechiidae
- Genus: Brachmia
- Species: B. philodema

Binomial name
- Brachmia philodema Meyrick, 1938

Species of moth

Brachmia philodema is a moth in the family Gelechiidae. It was described by Edward Meyrick in 1938. It is found in Yunnan, China.
