= Brachmia carphodes =

Scientific classification
- Domain: Eukaryota
- Kingdom: Animalia
- Phylum: Arthropoda
- Class: Insecta
- Order: Lepidoptera
- Family: Gelechiidae
- Genus: Brachmia
- Species: B. carphodes

Binomial name
- Brachmia carphodes (Meyrick, 1908)

Synonyms
- Apethistis carphodes Meyrick, 1908

Species of moth

Brachmia carphodes is a moth in the family Gelechiidae. It was described by Edward Meyrick in 1908. It is found in Assam, India.

The wingspan is 15–16 mm. The forewings are whitish-ochreous yellowish, irregularly sprinkled with deeper ochreous-yellow scales tipped with dark fuscous. There are blackish dots at the base of the costa and dorsum, and a short blackish dash beneath the costa near the base. The stigmata are blackish, the plical rather obliquely before the first discal, both moderate, the second discal large and round. There are patches of fuscous suffusion sprinkled with blackish towards the costa at about three-fourths and beneath the second discal stigma, varying much in development. There is also a blackish dot on the dorsum before the tornus and an almost marginal series of undefined blackish dots along the posterior part of the costa and termen, not reaching the tornus. The hindwings are grey.
