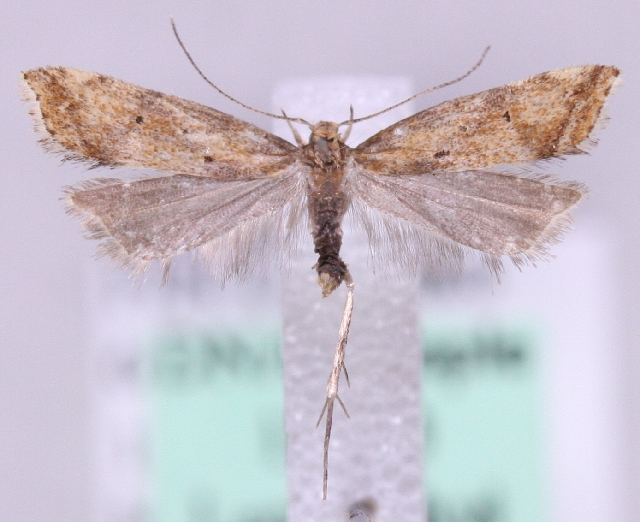

Scientific classification
- Kingdom: Animalia
- Phylum: Arthropoda
- Class: Insecta
- Order: Lepidoptera
- Family: Gelechiidae
- Genus: Brachmia
- Species: B. blandella

Binomial name
- Brachmia blandella (Fabricius, 1798)

Synonyms
- Tinea blandella Fabricius, 1798; Gelechia gerronella Zeller, 1850

= Brachmia blandella =

Gorse crest

Species of moth

Brachmia blandella, the gorse crest, is a moth of the family Gelechiidae. It is found in most of Europe, except Ireland, Slovenia and Croatia. The habitat consists of woodland margins and heath.

The wingspan is 12–14 mm. Adults are on wing from June to August. There is one generation per year.

The larvae feed on Ulex europaeus. The species overwinters as a young larva in a slight spinning on the host plant. Pupation takes place in early June.
