= Brachmia liberta =

Scientific classification
- Domain: Eukaryota
- Kingdom: Animalia
- Phylum: Arthropoda
- Class: Insecta
- Order: Lepidoptera
- Family: Gelechiidae
- Genus: Brachmia
- Species: B. liberta

Binomial name
- Brachmia liberta Meyrick, 1926

Species of moth

Brachmia liberta is a moth in the family Gelechiidae. It was described by Edward Meyrick in 1926. It is found on Madagascar.

The wingspan is 9–10 mm. The forewings are pale ochreous, with some scattered dark fuscous specks. The stigmata is moderate, dark fuscous, the plical obliquely beyond the first discal. There is an almost marginal series of irregular dark fuscous dots around the posterior part of the costa and termen. The hindwings are ochreous whitish.
