= Brachmia circumfusa =

Scientific classification
- Domain: Eukaryota
- Kingdom: Animalia
- Phylum: Arthropoda
- Class: Insecta
- Order: Lepidoptera
- Family: Gelechiidae
- Genus: Brachmia
- Species: B. circumfusa

Binomial name
- Brachmia circumfusa Meyrick, 1922

Species of moth

Brachmia circumfusa is a moth in the family Gelechiidae. It was described by Edward Meyrick in 1922. It is found in Guinea.

The wingspan is 12–13 mm. The forewings are pale violet fuscous, the costal and terminal edge are ochreous yellow and the discal stigmata small and blackish, the second somewhat larger. There is a pre-marginal series of small blackish dots around the posterior part of the costa and termen. The hindwings are grey.
