= Brachmia velitaris =

Scientific classification
- Domain: Eukaryota
- Kingdom: Animalia
- Phylum: Arthropoda
- Class: Insecta
- Order: Lepidoptera
- Family: Gelechiidae
- Genus: Brachmia
- Species: B. velitaris

Binomial name
- Brachmia velitaris Meyrick, 1913

Species of moth

Brachmia velitaris is a moth in the family Gelechiidae. It was described by Edward Meyrick in 1913. It is found in South Africa.

The wingspan is about 19 mm. The forewings are whitish ochreous with the costal edge dark fuscous towards the base and with a small flattened-triangular dark fuscous spot on the costa beyond the middle. The hindwings are pale ochreous yellowish.
