= Brachmia metoeca =

Scientific classification
- Domain: Eukaryota
- Kingdom: Animalia
- Phylum: Arthropoda
- Class: Insecta
- Order: Lepidoptera
- Family: Gelechiidae
- Genus: Brachmia
- Species: B. metoeca

Binomial name
- Brachmia metoeca (Meyrick, 1908)

Synonyms
- Apethistis metoeca Meyrick, 1908

Species of moth

Brachmia metoeca is a moth in the family Gelechiidae. It was described by Edward Meyrick in 1908. It is found in Sri Lanka.

The wingspan is 14–16 mm. The forewings are fuscous, irregularly sprinkled with paler and dark fuscous, appearing grey. The costa is anteriorly suffusedly irrorated (sprinkled) with dark fuscous, with a short dark fuscous dash beneath the costa near the base. The stigmata is moderate, dark fuscous, the plical obliquely before the first discal. There is a streak of fuscous suffusion irrorated with dark fuscous from four-fifths of the costa to above the second discal stigma and there is a spot of dark fuscous suffusion on the dorsum before the tornus, as well as an almost marginal series of undefined dark fuscous dots along the posterior fourth of the costa and termen. The hindwings are grey.
