= Brachmia craterospila =

Scientific classification
- Domain: Eukaryota
- Kingdom: Animalia
- Phylum: Arthropoda
- Class: Insecta
- Order: Lepidoptera
- Family: Gelechiidae
- Genus: Brachmia
- Species: B. craterospila

Binomial name
- Brachmia craterospila Meyrick, 1923

Species of moth

Brachmia craterospila is a moth in the family Gelechiidae. It was described by Edward Meyrick in 1923. It is found in Assam, India.

The wingspan is about 13 mm. The forewings are ochreous whitish, with a few grey specks and a blackish-grey spot on the base of the costa, as well as a small spot on the dorsum near the base. The stigmata is large and blackish, the plical slightly before the first discal, the second discal larger, forming a round spot. There is a small blackish spot on the dorsum towards the tornus and a pre-marginal series of cloudy blackish dots around the posterior part of the costa and termen. The hindwings are light grey.
