= Brachmia hedemanni =

Scientific classification
- Domain: Eukaryota
- Kingdom: Animalia
- Phylum: Arthropoda
- Class: Insecta
- Order: Lepidoptera
- Family: Gelechiidae
- Genus: Brachmia
- Species: B. hedemanni

Binomial name
- Brachmia hedemanni Caradja, 1920

Species of moth

Brachmia hedemanni is a moth in the family Gelechiidae. It was described by Aristide Caradja in 1920. It is found in Darjeeling, India.
