= Brachmia monotona =

Scientific classification
- Domain: Eukaryota
- Kingdom: Animalia
- Phylum: Arthropoda
- Class: Insecta
- Order: Lepidoptera
- Family: Gelechiidae
- Genus: Brachmia
- Species: B. monotona

Binomial name
- Brachmia monotona Caradja, 1927

Species of moth

Brachmia monotona is a moth in the family Gelechiidae. It was described by Aristide Caradja in 1927. It is found in China.
