= Brachmia infuscatella =

Scientific classification
- Kingdom: Animalia
- Phylum: Arthropoda
- Class: Insecta
- Order: Lepidoptera
- Family: Gelechiidae
- Genus: Brachmia
- Species: B. infuscatella

Binomial name
- Brachmia infuscatella Rebel, 1940

Species of moth

Brachmia infuscatella is a moth of the family Gelechiidae. It is found on the Azores.
