= Brachmia tholeromicta =

Scientific classification
- Domain: Eukaryota
- Kingdom: Animalia
- Phylum: Arthropoda
- Class: Insecta
- Order: Lepidoptera
- Family: Gelechiidae
- Genus: Brachmia
- Species: B. tholeromicta

Binomial name
- Brachmia tholeromicta Meyrick, 1931

Species of moth

Brachmia tholeromicta is a moth in the family Gelechiidae. It was described by Edward Meyrick in 1931. It is found in Sierra Leone.
