= Brachmia tepidata =

Scientific classification
- Domain: Eukaryota
- Kingdom: Animalia
- Phylum: Arthropoda
- Class: Insecta
- Order: Lepidoptera
- Family: Gelechiidae
- Genus: Brachmia
- Species: B. tepidata

Binomial name
- Brachmia tepidata Meyrick, 1922

Species of moth

Brachmia tepidata is a moth in the family Gelechiidae. It was described by Edward Meyrick in 1922. It is found in Shanghai, China.

The wingspan is about 18 mm. The forewings are ochreous brown, the costa and dorsum suffused with dark brown. The stigmata is dark brown, the plical rather beyond the first discal. There is a rather narrow suffused dark fuscous terminal fascia, with the extreme terminal edge whitish. The hindwings are grey.
