= Brachmia ptochodryas =

Scientific classification
- Domain: Eukaryota
- Kingdom: Animalia
- Phylum: Arthropoda
- Class: Insecta
- Order: Lepidoptera
- Family: Gelechiidae
- Genus: Brachmia
- Species: B. ptochodryas

Binomial name
- Brachmia ptochodryas Meyrick, 1923

Species of moth

Brachmia ptochodryas is a moth in the family Gelechiidae. It was described by Edward Meyrick in 1923. It is found in Assam, India.

The wingspan is about 12 mm. The forewings are light brownish ochreous speckled with fuscous, with the stigmata dark fuscous, the plical little marked, somewhat before the first discal. There is an undefined spot of dark fuscous suffusion on the dorsal before the second discal and a pre-marginal series of cloudy dark fuscous dots around the posterior part of the costa and termen. The hindwings are grey.
