= Brachmia planicola =

Scientific classification
- Domain: Eukaryota
- Kingdom: Animalia
- Phylum: Arthropoda
- Class: Insecta
- Order: Lepidoptera
- Family: Gelechiidae
- Genus: Brachmia
- Species: B. planicola

Binomial name
- Brachmia planicola Meyrick, 1932

Species of moth

Brachmia planicola is a moth in the family Gelechiidae. It was described by Edward Meyrick in 1932. It is found in Tamil Nadu, India.
