= Brachmia torva =

Scientific classification
- Domain: Eukaryota
- Kingdom: Animalia
- Phylum: Arthropoda
- Class: Insecta
- Order: Lepidoptera
- Family: Gelechiidae
- Genus: Brachmia
- Species: B. torva

Binomial name
- Brachmia torva Meyrick, 1914

Species of moth

Brachmia torva is a moth in the family Gelechiidae. It was described by Edward Meyrick in 1914. It is found in Malawi.

The wingspan is about 16 mm. The forewings are leaden grey with yellow-ochreous markings, centrally tinged with brownish and edged with black. There is a short slender mark on the dorsum towards the base and there are four moderate irregular fasciae, the first three oblique, the first from the costa near the base, not reaching the dorsum, the second before the middle, not reaching the costa and broadest on the dorsum, the third from the middle of the costa, prominent in the disc posteriorly, not reaching the dorsum and the fourth from four-fifths of the costa to the dorsum before the tornus, almost interrupted in the disc. The hindwings are grey.
