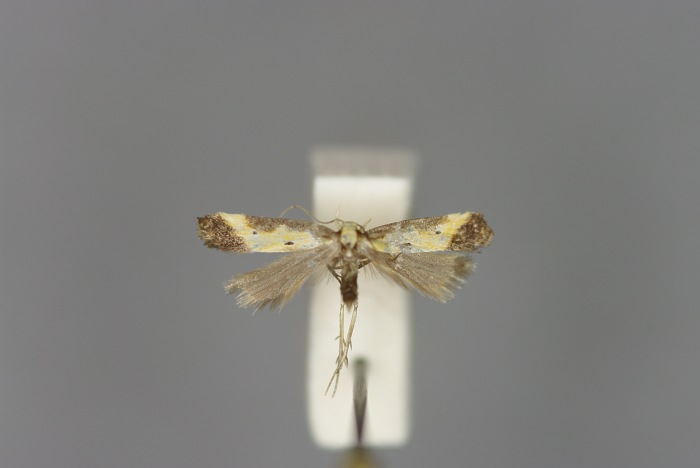

Scientific classification
- Domain: Eukaryota
- Kingdom: Animalia
- Phylum: Arthropoda
- Class: Insecta
- Order: Lepidoptera
- Family: Gelechiidae
- Genus: Brachmia
- Species: B. dimidiella

Binomial name
- Brachmia dimidiella (Denis & Schiffermüller, 1775)

Synonyms
- Tinea dimidiella Denis & Schiffermüller, 1775; Gelechia costiguttella Lienig & Zeller, 1846; Brachmia kneri Nowicki, 1865

= Brachmia dimidiella =

Species of moth

Brachmia dimidiella is a moth of the family Gelechiidae. It is found in most of Europe (except Ireland, Great Britain, Portugal, Croatia and Greece), east to Japan.

The wingspan is 10–11 mm. Adults are on wing from June to August.
