= Brachmia amphisticta =

Scientific classification
- Domain: Eukaryota
- Kingdom: Animalia
- Phylum: Arthropoda
- Class: Insecta
- Order: Lepidoptera
- Family: Gelechiidae
- Genus: Brachmia
- Species: B. amphisticta

Binomial name
- Brachmia amphisticta Meyrick, 1914

Synonyms
- Thubana amphisticta Meyrick, 1914

Species of moth

Brachmia amphisticta is a moth in the family Gelechiidae. It was described by Edward Meyrick in 1914. It is found in Mozambique.

The wingspan is 13–14 mm. The forewings are dark fuscous with the stigmata obscurely darker and the plical beneath the first discal, all edged posteriorly and the second discal also anteriorly with ochreous-whitish dots. The hindwings are dark grey.
