= Brachmia obtrectata =

Scientific classification
- Domain: Eukaryota
- Kingdom: Animalia
- Phylum: Arthropoda
- Class: Insecta
- Order: Lepidoptera
- Family: Gelechiidae
- Genus: Brachmia
- Species: B. obtrectata

Binomial name
- Brachmia obtrectata Meyrick, 1922

Species of moth

Brachmia obtrectata is a moth in the family Gelechiidae. It was described by Edward Meyrick in 1922. It is found in Shanghai, China.

The wingspan is about 11 mm (0.43 in). The forewings are whitish ochreous speckled with fuscous and the stigmata is dark fuscous, the plical beneath the first discal. There is a pre-marginal series of cloudy dark fuscous dots around the posterior part of the costa and termen. The hindwings are pale whitish grey.
