= Brachmia japonicella =

Scientific classification
- Kingdom: Animalia
- Phylum: Arthropoda
- Clade: Pancrustacea
- Class: Insecta
- Order: Lepidoptera
- Family: Gelechiidae
- Genus: Brachmia
- Species: B. japonicella

Binomial name
- Brachmia japonicella (Zeller, 1877)

Synonyms
- Gelechia (Ceratophora?) japonicella Zeller, 1877; Cymotricha japonicella

Species of moth

Brachmia japonicella is a moth in the family Gelechiidae. It was described by Philipp Christoph Zeller in 1877. It is found in Japan and Korea.

The wingspan is 15–19 mm.
