= Brachmia juridica =

Scientific classification
- Domain: Eukaryota
- Kingdom: Animalia
- Phylum: Arthropoda
- Class: Insecta
- Order: Lepidoptera
- Family: Gelechiidae
- Genus: Brachmia
- Species: B. juridica

Binomial name
- Brachmia juridica Meyrick, 1911

Synonyms
- Apethistis juridica (Meyrick, 1911)

Species of moth

Brachmia juridica is a moth in the family Gelechiidae. It was described by Edward Meyrick in 1911. It is found in Sri Lanka.

The wingspan is 13–17 mm. The forewings are purplish grey, sprinkled with dark fuscous, more strongly in females. The stigmata are dark fuscous, the plical somewhat before the first discal. There is a spot of dark fuscous suffusion on the dorsum before the tornus. The hindwings are grey, darker in females.
