= Scieropepla =

Scientific classification
- Kingdom: Animalia
- Phylum: Arthropoda
- Class: Insecta
- Order: Lepidoptera
- Family: Gelechiidae
- Subfamily: Dichomeridinae
- Genus: Scieropepla; Meyrick, 1886

Synonyms
- Aulacomima Meyrick, 1904

Genus of moths

Scieropepla is a genus of moths in the family Oecophoridae.

== Species ==
- Scieropepla acrates Meyrick, 1890
- Scieropepla argoloma Lower, 1897
- Scieropepla byblinopa Meyrick, 1925 (from Madagascar)
- Scieropepla ceramochroa (Turner, 1919)
- Scieropepla gibeauxella Viette, 1986 (from Madagascar)
- Scieropepla liophanes Meyrick, 1890
- Scieropepla megadelpha Lower, 1899
- Scieropepla minetorum Viette, 1987 (from Madagascar)
- Scieropepla monoides Turner, 1906
- Scieropepla nephelocentra Meyrick, 1933 (from Madagascar)
- Scieropepla obfuscata Meyrick, 1921
- Scieropepla orthosema (Lower, 1893)
- Scieropepla oxyptera Meyrick, 1890
- Scieropepla photinodes (Lower, 1897)
- Scieropepla peyrierasella Viette, 1986 (from Madagascar)
- Scieropepla polioleuca (Turner, 1919)
- Scieropepla polyxesta Meyrick, 1890
- Scieropepla ptilosticta Meyrick, 1915
- Scieropepla reversella (Walker, 1864)
- Scieropepla rimata Meyrick, 1890
- Scieropepla serica (Turner, 1944)
- Scieropepla serina Meyrick, 1890
- Scieropepla trinervis (Meyrick, 1904)
- Scieropepla typhicola Meyrick, 1886
