= Brachmia autonoma =

Scientific classification
- Domain: Eukaryota
- Kingdom: Animalia
- Phylum: Arthropoda
- Class: Insecta
- Order: Lepidoptera
- Family: Gelechiidae
- Genus: Brachmia
- Species: B. autonoma

Binomial name
- Brachmia autonoma Meyrick, 1910

Species of moth

Brachmia autonoma is a moth in the family Gelechiidae. It was described by Edward Meyrick in 1910. It is found on the Chagos Archipelago in the Indian Ocean.

The wingspan is about 12 mm. The forewings are pale yellow ochreous suffusedly mixed with light brownish. The stigmata is dark fuscous, the plical somewhat before the first discal and there is a small cloudy fuscous spot on the dorsum beneath the second discal, as well as a row of dark fuscous dots around the posterior part of the costa and termen. The hindwings are pale greyish.
