= Brachmia triophthalma =

Scientific classification
- Domain: Eukaryota
- Kingdom: Animalia
- Phylum: Arthropoda
- Class: Insecta
- Order: Lepidoptera
- Family: Gelechiidae
- Genus: Brachmia
- Species: B. triophthalma

Binomial name
- Brachmia triophthalma (Meyrick, 1910)

Synonyms
- Lecithocera triophthalma Meyrick, 1910

Species of moth

Brachmia triophthalma is a moth in the family Gelechiidae. It was described by Edward Meyrick in 1910. It is found in southern India.

The wingspan is about 11 mm. The forewings are rather dark fuscous, somewhat mixed with whitish ochreous. The stigmata is represented by round blackish spots edged with whitish ochreous, the plical beneath the first discal. There is an indistinct whitish-ochreous subterminal line, indented beneath the costa, forming a wedge-shaped inwardly oblique mark on the costa. The hindwings are pale fuscous.
