= Brachmia ballotellus =

Scientific classification
- Domain: Eukaryota
- Kingdom: Animalia
- Phylum: Arthropoda
- Class: Insecta
- Order: Lepidoptera
- Family: Gelechiidae
- Genus: Brachmia
- Species: B. ballotellus

Binomial name
- Brachmia ballotellus (Amsel, 1935)

Synonyms
- Hypsolophus ballotellus Amsel, 1935

Species of moth

Brachmia ballotellus is a moth in the family Gelechiidae. It was described by Hans Georg Amsel in 1935. It is found in Palestine.
