= Brachmia leucopla =

Scientific classification
- Domain: Eukaryota
- Kingdom: Animalia
- Phylum: Arthropoda
- Class: Insecta
- Order: Lepidoptera
- Family: Gelechiidae
- Genus: Brachmia
- Species: B. leucopla

Binomial name
- Brachmia leucopla Meyrick, 1938

Species of moth

Brachmia leucopla is a moth in the family Gelechiidae. It was described by Edward Meyrick in 1938. It is found in North Kivu province of the Democratic Republic of the Congo.
