= Brachmia elaeophanes =

Scientific classification
- Domain: Eukaryota
- Kingdom: Animalia
- Phylum: Arthropoda
- Class: Insecta
- Order: Lepidoptera
- Family: Gelechiidae
- Genus: Brachmia
- Species: B. elaeophanes

Binomial name
- Brachmia elaeophanes Meyrick, 1930

Species of moth

Brachmia elaeophanes is a moth in the family Gelechiidae. It was described by Edward Meyrick in 1930. It is found in China.
