= Brachmia resoluta =

Scientific classification
- Domain: Eukaryota
- Kingdom: Animalia
- Phylum: Arthropoda
- Class: Insecta
- Order: Lepidoptera
- Family: Gelechiidae
- Genus: Brachmia
- Species: B. resoluta

Binomial name
- Brachmia resoluta Meyrick, 1918

Species of moth

Brachmia resoluta is a moth in the family Gelechiidae. It was described by Edward Meyrick in 1918. It is found in the Bengal region of what was then British India.

The wingspan is about 13 mm. The forewings are light greyish ochreous irrorated (sprinkled) with fuscous and with a dark fuscous dot on the base of the costa. The stigmata is dark fuscous, the plical beneath the first discal and there are almost marginal cloudy, dark fuscous dots around the posterior part of the costa and termen. The hindwings are pale grey.
