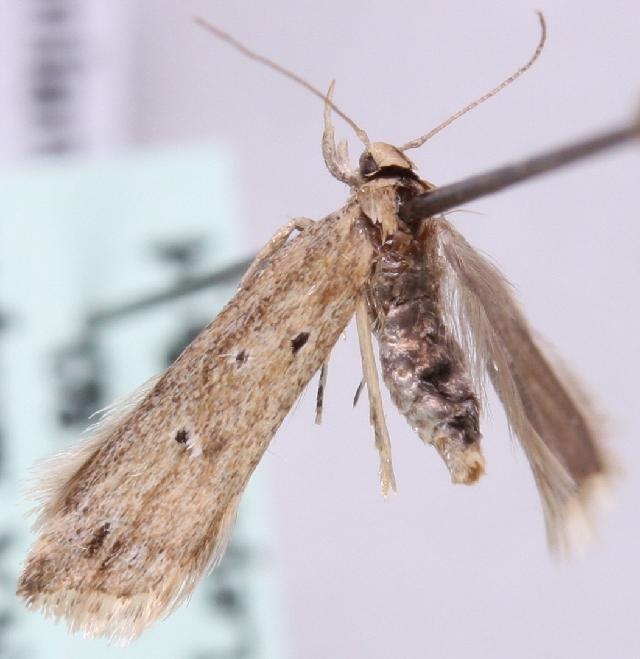

Scientific classification
- Domain: Eukaryota
- Kingdom: Animalia
- Phylum: Arthropoda
- Class: Insecta
- Order: Lepidoptera
- Family: Gelechiidae
- Genus: Brachmia
- Species: B. inornatella

Binomial name
- Brachmia inornatella (Douglas, 1850)

Synonyms
- Gelechia inornatella Douglas, 1850

= Brachmia inornatella =

Fen crest

Species of moth

Brachmia inornatella, the fen crest, is a moth of the family Gelechiidae. It is found in large parts of Europe, except Ireland, Norway, Lithuania and most of southern Europe.

The wingspan is 14–16 mm. Adults have been recorded on wing from May to August.

The larvae feed on various grasses, including Phragmites australis. They probably feed internally in the stems.
