= Brachmia apricata =

Scientific classification
- Domain: Eukaryota
- Kingdom: Animalia
- Phylum: Arthropoda
- Class: Insecta
- Order: Lepidoptera
- Family: Gelechiidae
- Genus: Brachmia
- Species: B. apricata

Binomial name
- Brachmia apricata Meyrick, 1913

Species of moth

Brachmia apricata is a moth in the family Gelechiidae. It was described by Edward Meyrick in 1913. It is found in South Africa.

The wingspan is 14–16 mm. The forewings are deep yellow, slightly ferruginous tinged. The hindwings are grey.
