= Brachmia dilutiterminella =

Scientific classification
- Domain: Eukaryota
- Kingdom: Animalia
- Phylum: Arthropoda
- Class: Insecta
- Order: Lepidoptera
- Family: Gelechiidae
- Genus: Brachmia
- Species: B. dilutiterminella

Binomial name
- Brachmia dilutiterminella (Gerasimov, 1930)

Synonyms
- Cladodes dilutiterminella Gerasimov, 1930

Species of moth

Brachmia dilutiterminella is a moth in the family Gelechiidae. It was described by Aleksey Maksimovich Gerasimov in 1930. It is found in Uzbekistan.
