= Brachmia insuavis =

Scientific classification
- Domain: Eukaryota
- Kingdom: Animalia
- Phylum: Arthropoda
- Class: Insecta
- Order: Lepidoptera
- Family: Gelechiidae
- Genus: Brachmia
- Species: B. insuavis

Binomial name
- Brachmia insuavis Meyrick, 1914

Species of moth

Brachmia insuavis is a moth in the family Gelechiidae. It was described by Edward Meyrick in 1914. It is found in Taiwan.
