= Brachmia procursella =

Scientific classification
- Kingdom: Animalia
- Phylum: Arthropoda
- Class: Insecta
- Order: Lepidoptera
- Family: Gelechiidae
- Genus: Brachmia
- Species: B. procursella

Binomial name
- Brachmia procursella Rebel, 1903

Species of moth

Brachmia procursella is a moth of the family Gelechiidae. It is found in Austria, Switzerland, Italy, Hungary, Romania and Russia.
