= Brachmia xeronoma =

Scientific classification
- Domain: Eukaryota
- Kingdom: Animalia
- Phylum: Arthropoda
- Class: Insecta
- Order: Lepidoptera
- Family: Gelechiidae
- Genus: Brachmia
- Species: B. xeronoma

Binomial name
- Brachmia xeronoma Meyrick, 1935

Species of moth

Brachmia xeronoma is a moth in the family Gelechiidae. It was described by Edward Meyrick in 1935. It is found on Java in Indonesia.
