= Brachmia melicephala =

Scientific classification
- Domain: Eukaryota
- Kingdom: Animalia
- Phylum: Arthropoda
- Class: Insecta
- Order: Lepidoptera
- Family: Gelechiidae
- Genus: Brachmia
- Species: B. melicephala

Binomial name
- Brachmia melicephala Meyrick, 1918

Species of moth

Brachmia melicephala is a moth in the family Gelechiidae. It was described by Edward Meyrick in 1918. It is found in Myanmar.

The wingspan is about 13 mm. The forewings are pale fuscous irrorated (sprinkled) darker, the costa anteriorly suffused darker and the second discal stigma obscurely darker. The hindwings are light grey.
