= Brachmia philochersa =

Scientific classification
- Domain: Eukaryota
- Kingdom: Animalia
- Phylum: Arthropoda
- Class: Insecta
- Order: Lepidoptera
- Family: Gelechiidae
- Genus: Brachmia
- Species: B. philochersa

Binomial name
- Brachmia philochersa Meyrick, 1938

Species of moth

Brachmia philochersa is a moth in the family Gelechiidae. It was described by Edward Meyrick in 1938. It is found in Papua New Guinea.
