= Brachmia ioplaca =

Scientific classification
- Domain: Eukaryota
- Kingdom: Animalia
- Phylum: Arthropoda
- Class: Insecta
- Order: Lepidoptera
- Family: Gelechiidae
- Genus: Brachmia
- Species: B. ioplaca

Binomial name
- Brachmia ioplaca Meyrick, 1934

Species of moth

Brachmia ioplaca is a moth in the family Gelechiidae. It was described by Edward Meyrick in 1934. It is found in Taiwan.
