= Brachmia alienella =

Scientific classification
- Kingdom: Animalia
- Phylum: Arthropoda
- Class: Insecta
- Order: Lepidoptera
- Family: Gelechiidae
- Genus: Brachmia
- Species: B. alienella

Binomial name
- Brachmia alienella (Walker, 1864)

Synonyms
- Gelechia alienella Walker, 1864

Species of moth

Brachmia alienella is a moth in the family Gelechiidae. It was described by Francis Walker in 1864. It is found in Sri Lanka.

Adults are pale cinereous (ash gray) fawn, the forewings speckled with brown along the costa and exterior border. There are two blackish points in the disc, one before the middle and the other beyond the middle. The exterior border is very oblique. The hindwings are cinereous.
