= Scieropepla obfuscata =

Scientific classification
- Kingdom: Animalia
- Phylum: Arthropoda
- Class: Insecta
- Order: Lepidoptera
- Family: Gelechiidae
- Genus: Scieropepla
- Species: S. obfuscata

Binomial name
- Scieropepla obfuscata (Meyrick, 1921)

Synonyms
- Brachmia obfuscata Meyrick, 1921

Species of moth

Scieropepla obfuscata is a moth of the family Oecophoridae. It was described by Edward Meyrick in 1921. It is found in Queensland, Australia.

The wingspan is about 10 mm. The forewings are purplish fuscous, obscurely speckled with ochreous whitish. The stigmata is large, dark fuscous, accompanied with two or three whitish scales on the sides and with the plical slightly before the first discal, an additional cloudy spot is located midway between the first discal and the base and there is an obscure pale obtusely angulated subterminal line, indented above the middle. The hindwings are grey, lighter and bluish tinged in the disc.
