= Scieropepla ceramochroa =

Scientific classification
- Domain: Eukaryota
- Kingdom: Animalia
- Phylum: Arthropoda
- Class: Insecta
- Order: Lepidoptera
- Family: Gelechiidae
- Genus: Scieropepla
- Species: S. ceramochroa

Binomial name
- Scieropepla ceramochroa (Turner, 1919)

Synonyms
- Aulacomima ceramochroa Turner, 1919; Brachmia ceramochroa

Species of moth

Scieropepla ceramochroa is a moth of the family Oecophoridae. It was described by Alfred Jefferis Turner in 1919. It is found in Queensland.

The wingspan is about 12 mm. The forewings are whitish-brown, suffused with pale fuscous, except towards the base. There is a short dark fuscous streak surrounded by ochreous on the fold before the middle. There is also an ochreous spot in the disc before the middle and another shortly beyond the middle, sometimes connected by a fuscous streak. A similar longitudinal streak precedes the first spot, and there may be another on the costal side of that spot. The hindwings are pale grey.
