= Scieropepla trinervis =

Scientific classification
- Kingdom: Animalia
- Phylum: Arthropoda
- Clade: Pancrustacea
- Class: Insecta
- Order: Lepidoptera
- Family: Gelechiidae
- Genus: Scieropepla
- Species: S. trinervis

Binomial name
- Scieropepla trinervis (Meyrick, 1904)

Synonyms
- Aulacomima trinervis Meyrick, 1904; Brachmia trinervis

Species of moth

Scieropepla trinervis is a moth of the family Oecophoridae. It was described by Edward Meyrick in 1904. It is found in the Australian states of New South Wales, Queensland, South Australia and Victoria.

The wingspan is about 13 mm. The forewings are pale fuscous, suffusedly mixed with dark fuscous, forming interneural streaks towards the costa posteriorly. The hindwings are whitish grey, but paler towards the base. Adults have been recorded on wing in December and February.

The larvae bore in old flower spikes of Banksia species, including Banksia ericifolia.
