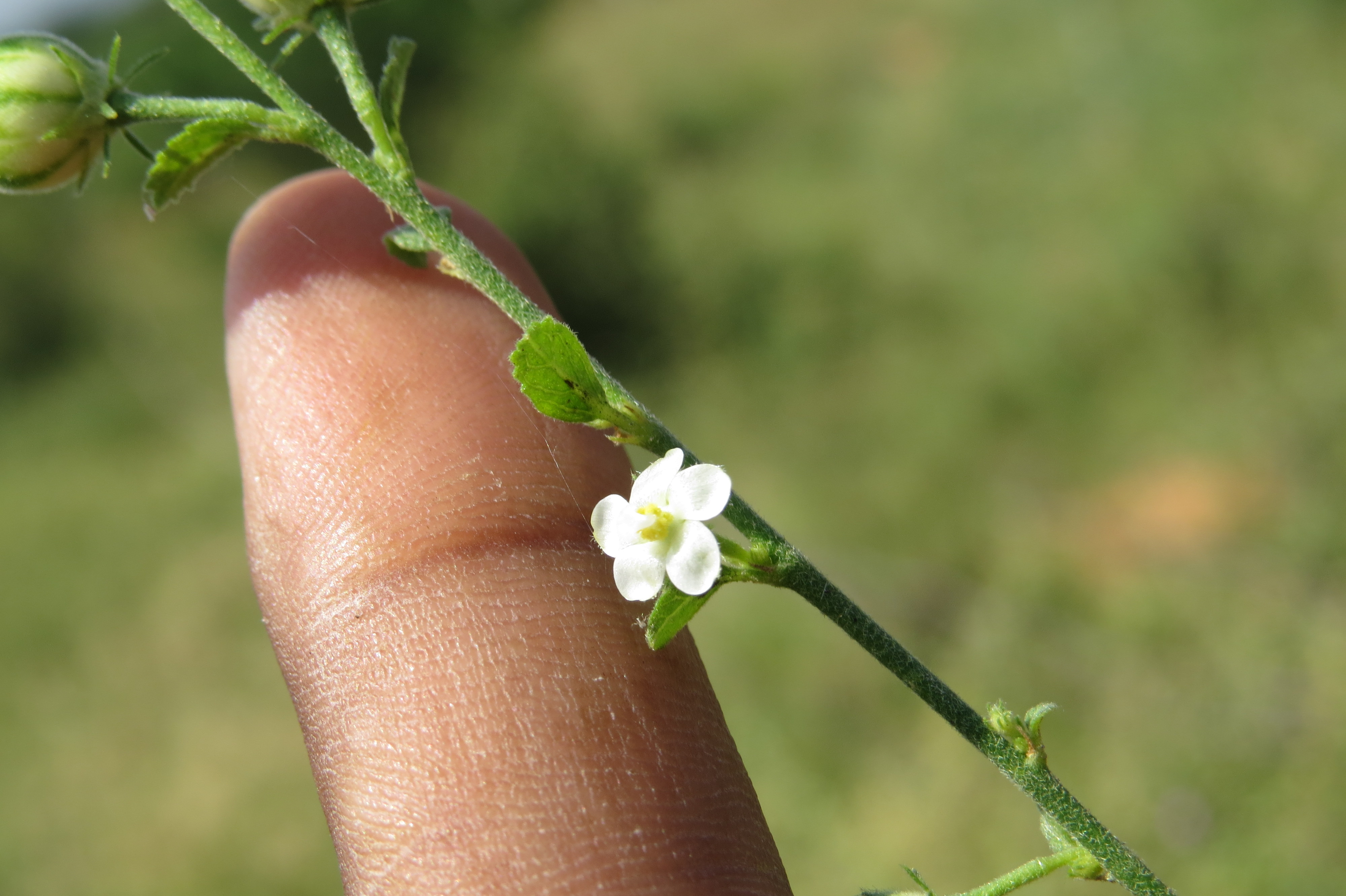
- Flower with human finger for scale
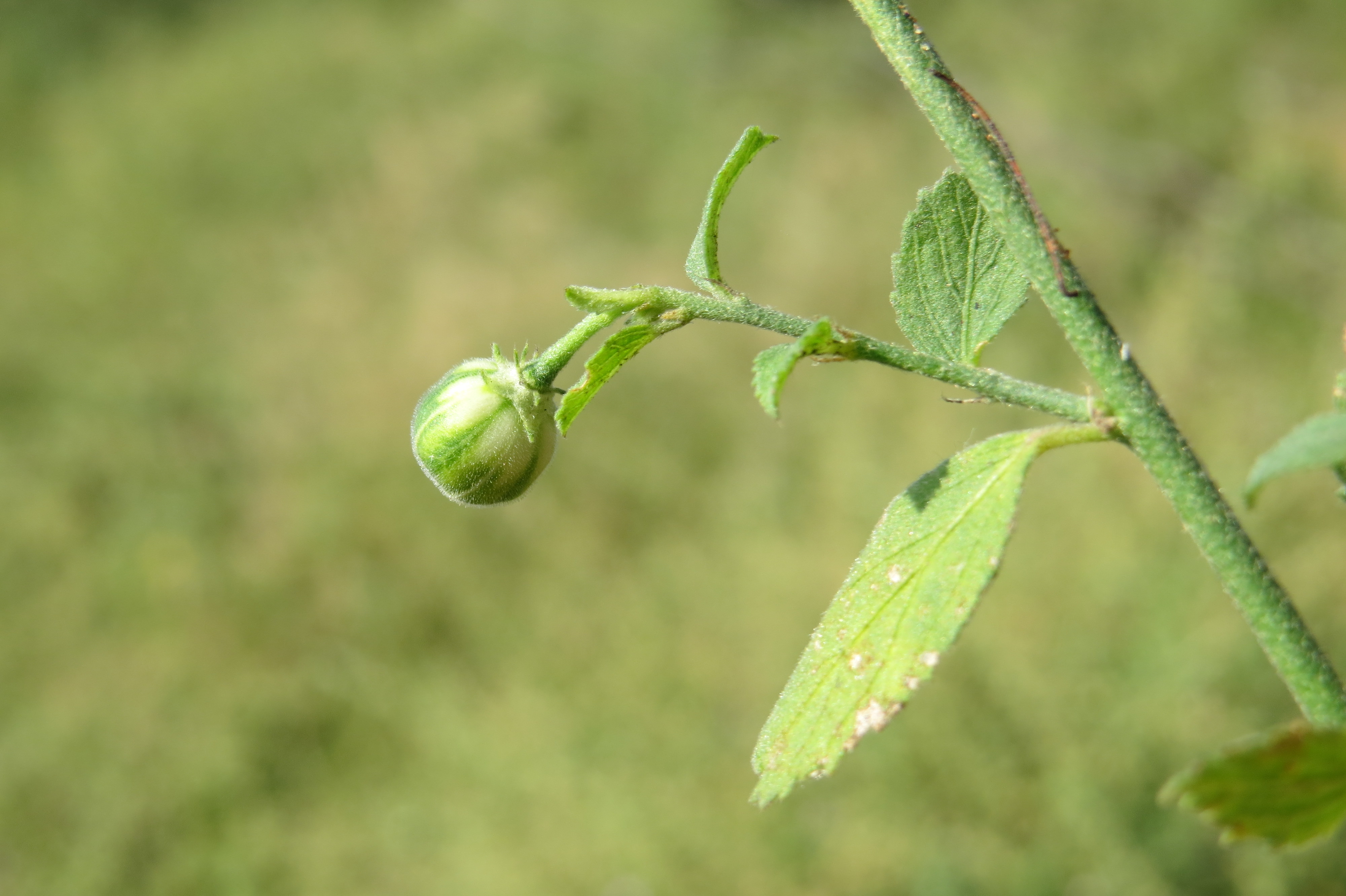
- Flower bud and leaves

Scientific classification
- Kingdom: Plantae
- Clade: Tracheophytes
- Clade: Angiosperms
- Clade: Eudicots
- Clade: Rosids
- Order: Malvales
- Family: Malvaceae
- Genus: Hibiscus
- Species: H. micranthus

Binomial name
- Hibiscus micranthus L.f.

Synonyms
- List: Hibiscus capillipes Mattei; Hibiscus clandestinus Cav.; Hibiscus intermedius Hochst. ex T.Anderson; Hibiscus micranthus var. alii Abedin; Hibiscus micranthus var. asper Cufod.; Hibiscus micranthus var. hermanniifolius (Hochst. ex Hochr.) Cufod.; Hibiscus micranthus var. lepineyi Sauvage; Hibiscus micranthus var. rigidus (L.f.) Cufod.; Hibiscus micranthus var. subclandestinus Maire; Hibiscus parvifolius Hochst. ex T.Anderson; Hibiscus pavoniformis Baill.; Hibiscus rigidus L.f.; Hibiscus suborbiculatus Wall.

= Hibiscus micranthus =

Species of plant

Hibiscus micranthus, the tiny flower hibiscus, is a widespread species of flowering plant in the family Malvaceae. A shrub, it is native to seasonally dry tropical areas of Africa, Madagascar, the Arabian Peninsula, Iran, the Indian Subcontinent, and Myanmar. It is used in traditional medicines.
