= Trichembola segnis =

Scientific classification
- Kingdom: Animalia
- Phylum: Arthropoda
- Class: Insecta
- Order: Lepidoptera
- Family: Gelechiidae
- Genus: Trichembola
- Species: T. segnis

Binomial name
- Trichembola segnis Meyrick, 1918

Species of moth

Trichembola segnis is a moth in the family Gelechiidae. It was described by Edward Meyrick in 1918. It is found in southern India and Assam.

The wingspan is 15–18 mm. The forewings are pale ochreous speckled with fuscous. The stigmata are dark fuscous, with the plical very obliquely before the first discal. The hindwings are pale grey.
