= Trichembola fuscata =

Scientific classification
- Kingdom: Animalia
- Phylum: Arthropoda
- Class: Insecta
- Order: Lepidoptera
- Family: Gelechiidae
- Genus: Trichembola
- Species: T. fuscata

Binomial name
- Trichembola fuscata Meyrick, 1918

Species of moth

Trichembola fuscata is a moth in the family Gelechiidae. It was described by Edward Meyrick in 1918. It is found in Sri Lanka.

The wingspan is 15–16 mm. The forewings are brown or fuscous, sprinkled with dark fuscous. The plical and second discal stigmata are darker and obscure, with the plical linear. There is a very oblique indistinct darker cloudy line from one-third of the costa to the lower angle of the cell. The hindwings are dark grey.
