= Trichembola unimaculata =

Scientific classification
- Domain: Eukaryota
- Kingdom: Animalia
- Phylum: Arthropoda
- Class: Insecta
- Order: Lepidoptera
- Family: Gelechiidae
- Genus: Trichembola
- Species: T. unimaculata

Binomial name
- Trichembola unimaculata M. Omelko & N. Omelko, 1993

Species of moth

Trichembola unimaculata is a moth in the family Gelechiidae. It was described by Mikhail Mikhailovich Omelko and Natalia Viktorovna Omelko in 1993. It is found in Korea and the Russian Far East.
