= Trichembola epichorda =

Scientific classification
- Kingdom: Animalia
- Phylum: Arthropoda
- Class: Insecta
- Order: Lepidoptera
- Family: Gelechiidae
- Genus: Trichembola
- Species: T. epichorda

Binomial name
- Trichembola epichorda Meyrick, 1918

Species of moth

Trichembola epichorda is a moth in the family Gelechiidae. It was described by Edward Meyrick in 1918. It is found in Assam, India.

The wingspan is about 17 mm. The forewings are whitish ochreous, slightly sprinkled with dark fuscous towards the margins and with a line of blackish sprinkles along vein 12. There are three longitudinal lines of black sprinkles in the disc, the uppermost posteriorly forked and running to the apex and beneath it, the median obsolescent posteriorly, lowest along the fold. There is an irregular oblique brown streak from one-third of the costa, and some suffused brown marking connecting these lines in the middle of the disc and along the termen. The hindwings are rather dark grey.
