= Trichembola palynata =

Scientific classification
- Kingdom: Animalia
- Phylum: Arthropoda
- Class: Insecta
- Order: Lepidoptera
- Family: Gelechiidae
- Genus: Trichembola
- Species: T. palynata

Binomial name
- Trichembola palynata Ghesquière, 1940

Species of moth

Trichembola palynata is a moth in the family Gelechiidae. It was described by Jean Ghesquière in 1940. It is found in the area of the former province Équateur in the Democratic Republic of the Congo.
