= Trichembola idiarcha =

Scientific classification
- Kingdom: Animalia
- Phylum: Arthropoda
- Class: Insecta
- Order: Lepidoptera
- Family: Gelechiidae
- Genus: Trichembola
- Species: T. idiarcha

Binomial name
- Trichembola idiarcha Meyrick, 1931

Species of moth

Trichembola idiarcha is a moth in the family Gelechiidae. It was described by Edward Meyrick in 1931. It is found in Brazil.
