= Trichembola opisthopa =

Scientific classification
- Kingdom: Animalia
- Phylum: Arthropoda
- Class: Insecta
- Order: Lepidoptera
- Family: Gelechiidae
- Genus: Trichembola
- Species: T. opisthopa

Binomial name
- Trichembola opisthopa Meyrick, 1918

Species of moth

Trichembola opisthopa is a moth in the family Gelechiidae. It was described by Edward Meyrick in 1918. It is found in southern India.

The wingspan is about 10 mm. The forewings are ochreous whitish becoming pale ochreous towards the apex, sprinkled with dark fuscous specks. The second discal stigma is blackish found at three-fourths. The hindwings are pale greyish.
