= Trichembola oreia =

Scientific classification
- Kingdom: Animalia
- Phylum: Arthropoda
- Class: Insecta
- Order: Lepidoptera
- Family: Gelechiidae
- Genus: Trichembola
- Species: T. oreia

Binomial name
- Trichembola oreia Ghesquière, 1940

Species of moth

Trichembola oreia is a moth in the family Gelechiidae. It was described by Jean Ghesquière in 1940. It is found in North Kivu in the Democratic Republic of the Congo.
