= Trichembola =

Scientific classification
- Domain: Eukaryota
- Kingdom: Animalia
- Phylum: Arthropoda
- Class: Insecta
- Order: Lepidoptera
- Family: Gelechiidae
- Subfamily: Gelechiinae
- Genus: Trichembola; Meyrick, 1918

Genus of moths

Trichembola is a genus of moths in the family Gelechiidae.

== Species ==
- Trichembola epichorda Meyrick, 1918
- Trichembola fuscata Meyrick, 1918
- Trichembola idiarcha Meyrick, 1931
- Trichembola opisthopa Meyrick, 1918
- Trichembola oreia Ghesquière, 1940
- Trichembola palynata Ghesquière, 1940
- Trichembola unimaculata Omelko & Omelko, 1993
- Trichembola segnis Meyrick, 1918
