= Aristotelia sticheris =

Scientific classification
- Kingdom: Animalia
- Phylum: Arthropoda
- Clade: Pancrustacea
- Class: Insecta
- Order: Lepidoptera
- Family: Gelechiidae
- Genus: Aristotelia
- Species: A. sticheris

Binomial name
- Aristotelia sticheris Turner, 1919

Species of moth

Aristotelia sticheris is a moth of the family Gelechiidae. It was described by Alfred Jefferis Turner in 1919. It is found in Australia, where it has been recorded from Queensland.

The wingspan is about 12 mm. The forewings are pale-grey with some fuscous irroration and a fine blackish streak along the fold from the base, and another from the base beneath the costa to one-fifth. A blackish dot is found in the middle of the disc at three-fifths, connected by a fine line with another at four-fifths. The hindwings are pale-grey.
