= Aristotelia tetracosma =

Scientific classification
- Kingdom: Animalia
- Phylum: Arthropoda
- Clade: Pancrustacea
- Class: Insecta
- Order: Lepidoptera
- Family: Gelechiidae
- Genus: Aristotelia
- Species: A. tetracosma

Binomial name
- Aristotelia tetracosma Meyrick, 1904

Species of moth

Aristotelia tetracosma is a moth of the family Gelechiidae. It was described by Edward Meyrick in 1904. It is found in Australia, where it has been recorded from Western Australia.

The wingspan is about 14 mm (0.55 in). The forewings are dark fuscous, with a faint purplish tinge and with an ochreous-white subtriangular blotch on the costa at one-fourth, reaching more than half across the wing. A similar smaller spot is found on the costa before three-fourths, reaching half across the wing. The hindwings are grey, darker posteriorly.
