= Aristotelia zetetica =

Scientific classification
- Kingdom: Animalia
- Phylum: Arthropoda
- Clade: Pancrustacea
- Class: Insecta
- Order: Lepidoptera
- Family: Gelechiidae
- Genus: Aristotelia
- Species: A. zetetica

Binomial name
- Aristotelia zetetica Meyrick, 1934

Species of moth

Aristotelia zetetica is a moth of the family Gelechiidae. It was described by Edward Meyrick in 1934. It is found in southern India.
