= Aristotelia leonhardi =

Scientific classification
- Kingdom: Animalia
- Phylum: Arthropoda
- Clade: Pancrustacea
- Class: Insecta
- Order: Lepidoptera
- Family: Gelechiidae
- Genus: Aristotelia
- Species: A. leonhardi

Binomial name
- Aristotelia leonhardi Krone, 1907

Species of moth

Aristotelia leonhardi is a moth of the family Gelechiidae. It is known from Austria.

The wingspan is about 10 mm. The forewings are leather-yellow. Adults have been recorded on wing in June.
