= Aristotelia articulata =

Scientific classification
- Kingdom: Animalia
- Phylum: Arthropoda
- Clade: Pancrustacea
- Class: Insecta
- Order: Lepidoptera
- Family: Gelechiidae
- Genus: Aristotelia
- Species: A. articulata

Binomial name
- Aristotelia articulata Meyrick, 1918

Species of moth

Aristotelia articulata is a moth of the family Gelechiidae. It was described by Edward Meyrick in 1918. It is found in southern India.

The wingspan is about 10 mm (0.39 in). The forewings are fuscous, the base whitish sprinkled and with a pale ochreous line along the fold, posteriorly suffused into the ground colour. There is an oblique white fascia sprinkled fuscous at one-fourth and a broader oblique white median fascia irrorated (sprinkled) with fuscous, both edges indented in the middle, the space between this and the preceding darker fuscous except dorsally. A short slender longitudinal black streak is found in the disc beyond this and there is a marginal series of white dots on the costa towards the apex and termen. The hindwings are light grey.
