= Aristotelia subrosea =

Scientific classification
- Kingdom: Animalia
- Phylum: Arthropoda
- Clade: Pancrustacea
- Class: Insecta
- Order: Lepidoptera
- Family: Gelechiidae
- Genus: Aristotelia
- Species: A. subrosea

Binomial name
- Aristotelia subrosea Meyrick, 1914

Species of moth

Aristotelia subrosea is a moth of the family Gelechiidae. It was described by Edward Meyrick in 1914. It is found in Guyana.

The wingspan is about 8 mm. The forewings are dark slaty grey with three oblique black streaks from the costa near the base, at one-sixth, and one-third respectively, reaching three-fourths across the wing, the third strongest, the second and third connected beneath by an irregular subdorsal brownish-ochreous streak, its extremities terminated with rosy whitish. The discal stigmata are elongate and black, the second edged above and beneath by small round ochreous spots. There is a spot of blackish suffusion on the costa at two-thirds and a whitish-rosy spot on the tornus and a smaller one on the costa beyond it, connected in the disc by a longitudinal black dash. The hindwings are grey.
