= Aristotelia saturnina =

Scientific classification
- Kingdom: Animalia
- Phylum: Arthropoda
- Clade: Pancrustacea
- Class: Insecta
- Order: Lepidoptera
- Family: Gelechiidae
- Genus: Aristotelia
- Species: A. saturnina

Binomial name
- Aristotelia saturnina Meyrick, 1917

Species of moth

Aristotelia saturnina is a moth of the family Gelechiidae. It was described by Edward Meyrick in 1917. It is found in Peru.

The wingspan is 11–12 mm. The forewings are rather dark fuscous, sometimes whitish speckled, the dorsal area is more or less suffused or marked with ochreous. There are obscure darker oblique bars from the costa at one-sixth and one-third to the fold, marked with black on the fold, more or less edged with whitish towards one another. The discal stigmata are blackish with a suffused brownish-ochreous streak beneath them and there is a suffused pale brownish-ochreous spot on the costa at four-fifths. The hindwings are grey.
