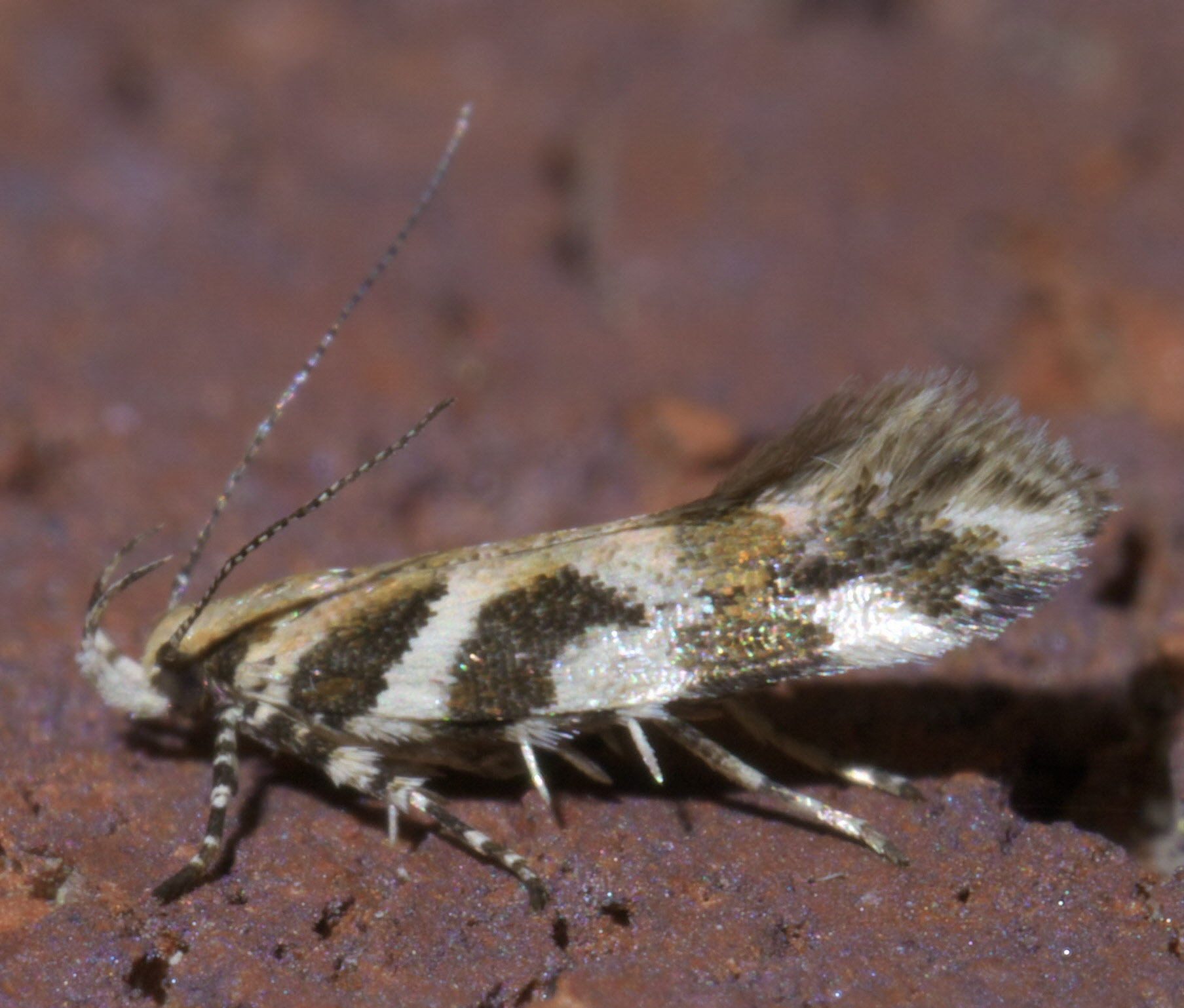
- Aristotelia devexella

Scientific classification
- Kingdom: Animalia
- Phylum: Arthropoda
- Clade: Pancrustacea
- Class: Insecta
- Order: Lepidoptera
- Family: Gelechiidae
- Genus: Aristotelia
- Species: A. devexella

Binomial name
- Aristotelia devexella Braun, 1925

= Aristotelia devexella =

Species of moth

Aristotelia devexella is a moth of the family Gelechiidae. It was described by Annette Frances Braun in 1925. It is found in North America, where it has been recorded from Alberta, Arizona and Oklahoma.
