= Aristotelia tyttha =

Scientific classification
- Kingdom: Animalia
- Phylum: Arthropoda
- Clade: Pancrustacea
- Class: Insecta
- Order: Lepidoptera
- Family: Gelechiidae
- Genus: Aristotelia
- Species: A. tyttha

Binomial name
- Aristotelia tyttha Falkovitsh & Bidzilya, 2003

Species of moth

Aristotelia tyttha is a moth of the family Gelechiidae. It was described by Mark I. Falkovitsh and Oleksiy V. Bidzilya in 2003. It is found in Uzbekistan.

The larvae feed on Atraphaxis spinosa.
