= Aristotelia dasypoda =

Scientific classification
- Kingdom: Animalia
- Phylum: Arthropoda
- Clade: Pancrustacea
- Class: Insecta
- Order: Lepidoptera
- Family: Gelechiidae
- Genus: Aristotelia
- Species: A. dasypoda

Binomial name
- Aristotelia dasypoda Walsingham, 1910

Species of moth

Aristotelia dasypoda is a moth of the family Gelechiidae. It was described by Thomas de Grey, 6th Baron Walsingham, in 1910. It is found in Mexico (Tabasco) and Jamaica.

The wingspan is about 11 mm. The forewings are ferruginous, with some black scaling, and three outwardly oblique white streaks from the costa, all more or less mixed with shining steely scales. The first, at about one-fifth, is reduplicated, margined, on its inner side with black scales which become concentrated in a spot resting on the fold, and reaches with its lustrous steely apex nearly to the dorsum at one-third. The second, single, reaching to a blackish spot on the fold and produced again below it in shining steel-grey to the dorsum beyond the middle. The third, from a little beyond the middle of the costa, passes on the outer side of a black dot at the end of the cell, to which the steel-grey scaling of the second streak extends, where it meets the apex of a fourth, similar, but inverted oblique white streak, coming from the costal cilia. Beyond this again is some black scaling extending outward to the apex. A small detached steely streak above the flexus, and a few steely scales above the tornus complete the rather confused pattern. The hindwings are rather pale greyish fuscous.
