= Aristotelia ouedella =

Scientific classification
- Kingdom: Animalia
- Phylum: Arthropoda
- Clade: Pancrustacea
- Class: Insecta
- Order: Lepidoptera
- Family: Gelechiidae
- Genus: Aristotelia
- Species: A. ouedella

Binomial name
- Aristotelia ouedella (Chrétien, 1908)

Synonyms
- Apodia ouedella Chrétien, 1908; Aristotelia vallicola Meyrick, 1925

Species of moth

Aristotelia ouedella is a moth of the family Gelechiidae. It was described by Pierre Chrétien in 1908. It is found in Algeria.
