= Aristotelia staticella =

Scientific classification
- Kingdom: Animalia
- Phylum: Arthropoda
- Clade: Pancrustacea
- Class: Insecta
- Order: Lepidoptera
- Family: Gelechiidae
- Genus: Aristotelia
- Species: A. staticella

Binomial name
- Aristotelia staticella (Millière, 1876)

Synonyms
- Ergatis (Gelechia) staticella Millière, 1876

Species of moth

Aristotelia staticella is a moth of the family Gelechiidae. It is found in France, Portugal and Ukraine, as well as on Sardinia.
