= Aristotelia incitata =

Scientific classification
- Kingdom: Animalia
- Phylum: Arthropoda
- Clade: Pancrustacea
- Class: Insecta
- Order: Lepidoptera
- Family: Gelechiidae
- Genus: Aristotelia
- Species: A. incitata

Binomial name
- Aristotelia incitata Meyrick, 1918

Species of moth

Aristotelia incitata is a moth of the family Gelechiidae. It was described by Edward Meyrick in 1918. It is found in Japan and Assam, India.

The wingspan is about 12 mm. The forewings are pale whitish-grey ochreous irrorated (sprinkled) with dark fuscous, more or less suffused whitish in the disc and with blackish dots beneath the costa near the base and before one-third, and beneath the fold at one-fifth. The stigmata are black, the plical obliquely before the first discal. There are also cloudy dark fuscous dots along the costa posteriorly and the termen. The hindwings are grey.
