= Aristotelia benedenii =

Scientific classification
- Kingdom: Animalia
- Phylum: Arthropoda
- Clade: Pancrustacea
- Class: Insecta
- Order: Lepidoptera
- Family: Gelechiidae
- Genus: Aristotelia
- Species: A. benedenii

Binomial name
- Aristotelia benedenii (Weyenbergh, 1873)

Synonyms
- Gelechia benedenii Weyenbergh, 1873

Species of moth

Aristotelia benedenii is a moth of the family Gelechiidae. It was described by Hendrik Weyenbergh Jr. in 1873. It was described from St. Vincente in Cape Verde.

The wingspan is about 10 mm. The forewings are dark grey, with very little black points. By flowing together, several of these points form an oblong, black spot about the tip of the wing, the hinder margin of the wing is also a little black. The sharp, lancet-form hindwing is pale grey. The fringe of the wings is also grey, in the forewings darker than in the hindwings.
