= Aristotelia themerastis =

Scientific classification
- Kingdom: Animalia
- Phylum: Arthropoda
- Clade: Pancrustacea
- Class: Insecta
- Order: Lepidoptera
- Family: Gelechiidae
- Genus: Aristotelia
- Species: A. themerastis

Binomial name
- Aristotelia themerastis Turner, 1919

Species of moth

Aristotelia themerastis is a moth of the family Gelechiidae. It was described by Alfred Jefferis Turner in 1919. It is found in Australia, where it has been recorded from New South Wales.

The wingspan is 12–13 mm. The forewings are pale-grey irrorated with darker grey and with four fuscous discal dots, often partly obsolete, the first at one-third, the second on the fold obliquely beyond the first, the third at two-thirds and the fourth beneath and beyond the third. There is a slight blackish irroration at the apex and along the termen. The hindwings are grey-whitish.
