= Aristotelia leucophanta =

Scientific classification
- Kingdom: Animalia
- Phylum: Arthropoda
- Clade: Pancrustacea
- Class: Insecta
- Order: Lepidoptera
- Family: Gelechiidae
- Genus: Aristotelia
- Species: A. leucophanta

Binomial name
- Aristotelia leucophanta Meyrick, 1908

Species of moth

Aristotelia leucophanta is a moth of the family Gelechiidae. It was described by Edward Meyrick in 1908. It is found in Assam, India.

The wingspan is about 10 mm. The forewings are brown, more or less suffused irregularly with dark fuscous and with a small oval white spot beneath the fold at two-fifths, and an oblique linear white mark beneath the costa at two-fifths, as well as a few scattered white scales in the middle of the disc. There is an irregular, sometimes interrupted white line from four-fifths of the costa to before the tornus, double on the median third and enclosing a blackish mark. Some whitish dots are found along the termen. The hindwings are dark fuscous, thinly scaled anteriorly.
