= Aristotelia callirrhoda =

Scientific classification
- Kingdom: Animalia
- Phylum: Arthropoda
- Clade: Pancrustacea
- Class: Insecta
- Order: Lepidoptera
- Family: Gelechiidae
- Genus: Aristotelia
- Species: A. callirrhoda

Binomial name
- Aristotelia callirrhoda Meyrick, 1923

Species of moth

Aristotelia callirrhoda is a moth of the family Gelechiidae. It was described by Edward Meyrick in 1923. It is found in North America, where it has been recorded from North Carolina.

The wingspan is 9–10 mm. The forewings are deep brown, the base suffused whitish and with an oblique white fascia at one-fourth, rosy tinged towards the dorsum, edged anteriorly by a few black scales. There is an angulated rosy-white median fascia sprinkled grey, and the plical and first discal stigmata form black dots on its anterior edge. There are white opposite spots more or less suffused rose pink on the costa at three-fourths and the tornus, separated by a short black dash in the disc. Between this and the apex there are three white marks on the costa separated with black. The hindwings are grey.
