= Aristotelia adceanotha =

Scientific classification
- Kingdom: Animalia
- Phylum: Arthropoda
- Clade: Pancrustacea
- Class: Insecta
- Order: Lepidoptera
- Family: Gelechiidae
- Genus: Aristotelia
- Species: A. adceanotha

Binomial name
- Aristotelia adceanotha Keifer, 1935

Species of moth

Aristotelia adceanotha is a moth of the family Gelechiidae. It was described by Keifer in 1935. It is found in North America, where it has been recorded from California and Washington.

The wingspan is 11–12 mm. The basal area of the forewings is dark fuscous brown or blackish-brown on the costal side of the fold and bright brown on the dorsal side, the extreme base orange-roseate. The first fascia is a white band obliquely outward from the costal one-fifth with dark edging on the inner side, this fascia orange-roseate and somewhat obscure on the dorsum reaching the dorsal edge at one-fourth. The area beyond, the same as basal area, except the dorsum somewhat orange-roseate. The central fascia is widest, whitish costally with slight fuscous infusion, fading to orange-roseate on the dorsal side of the fold and with a sharp wedge of dark colour projecting nearly across the center of this fascia. There is dark costal colouring from this fascia on, limited to a line from the center of four-fifths of the wing, where it meets a bright orange-roseate tornal spot on the midline where they are more or less interrupted by a black spot. The apex and some spots on the outer margin are orange-roseate. The hindwings are whitish, somewhat infuscated.

The larvae feed on Ceanothus cuneatus. The larvae have a whitish head, lined and blotched with dark purple-fuscous. The body is dark fuscous-brown, slightly purplish. They reach a length of about 8 mm when full-grown.
