= Aristotelia flavicapitella =

Scientific classification
- Kingdom: Animalia
- Phylum: Arthropoda
- Clade: Pancrustacea
- Class: Insecta
- Order: Lepidoptera
- Family: Gelechiidae
- Genus: Aristotelia
- Species: A. flavicapitella

Binomial name
- Aristotelia flavicapitella (Chrétien, 1915)

Synonyms
- Xystophora flavicapitella Chrétien, 1915

Species of moth

Aristotelia flavicapitella is a moth of the family Gelechiidae. It was described by Pierre Chrétien in 1915. It is found in Algeria.
