= Aristotelia citrocosma =

Scientific classification
- Kingdom: Animalia
- Phylum: Arthropoda
- Clade: Pancrustacea
- Class: Insecta
- Order: Lepidoptera
- Family: Gelechiidae
- Genus: Aristotelia
- Species: A. citrocosma

Binomial name
- Aristotelia citrocosma Meyrick, 1908

Species of moth

Aristotelia citrocosma is a moth of the family Gelechiidae. It was described by Edward Meyrick in 1908. It is found in Sri Lanka and Assam, India.

The wingspan is 7–9 mm. The forewings are fuscous, darker irrorated (sprinkled) and with brassy-yellow markings. There is a very oblique fascia near the base and a thick streak running from one-fourth of the costa to near the dorsum about the middle, then curved upwards to the disc beyond the middle, again angulated downwards to the tornus and continued along the termen to the apex. There is also an oblique strigula on the costa beyond the origin of this, and another at three-fourths. The hindwings are grey, thinly scaled in the disc.
