= Aristotelia squamigera =

Scientific classification
- Kingdom: Animalia
- Phylum: Arthropoda
- Clade: Pancrustacea
- Class: Insecta
- Order: Lepidoptera
- Family: Gelechiidae
- Genus: Aristotelia
- Species: A. squamigera

Binomial name
- Aristotelia squamigera Walsingham, 1909

Species of moth

Aristotelia squamigera is a moth of the family Gelechiidae. It was described by Thomas de Grey, 6th Baron Walsingham, in 1909. It is found in Mexico (Guerrero).

The wingspan is 10–12 mm. The forewings are rosy white, profusely sprinkled with brownish fuscous. There is an olivaceous brown patch at the base, much wider on the dorsum than on the costa, its outer edge oblique and somewhat clearly defined, its surface sprinkled, especially towards the base, with whitish scales. At about one-third a strong olivaceous brown costal patch, dilated obliquely outward and downward to the fold, is terminated at its outer extremity by a blackish spot. Beyond the middle a triangular olive-brown costal patch is terminated by a line of blackish scales truncating its apex on the cell, where it is joined by a fawn-ochreous patch extending to the dorsum, but sprinkled about the end of the fold with olive-brown scaling. A short blackish dash cuts the pale fascia beyond the end of the cell, the terminal area being sprinkled with olive-brown leading up to some blackish marginal spots at the base of the greyish ochreous cilia through which run two curved shade-lines enclosing the white apex. There is a small brownish ochreous streak below the fold adjoining the lower edge of the second dark patch. The hindwings are rather shining brassy grey, the dorsal half profusely dusted with elongate greyish fuscous scales.
