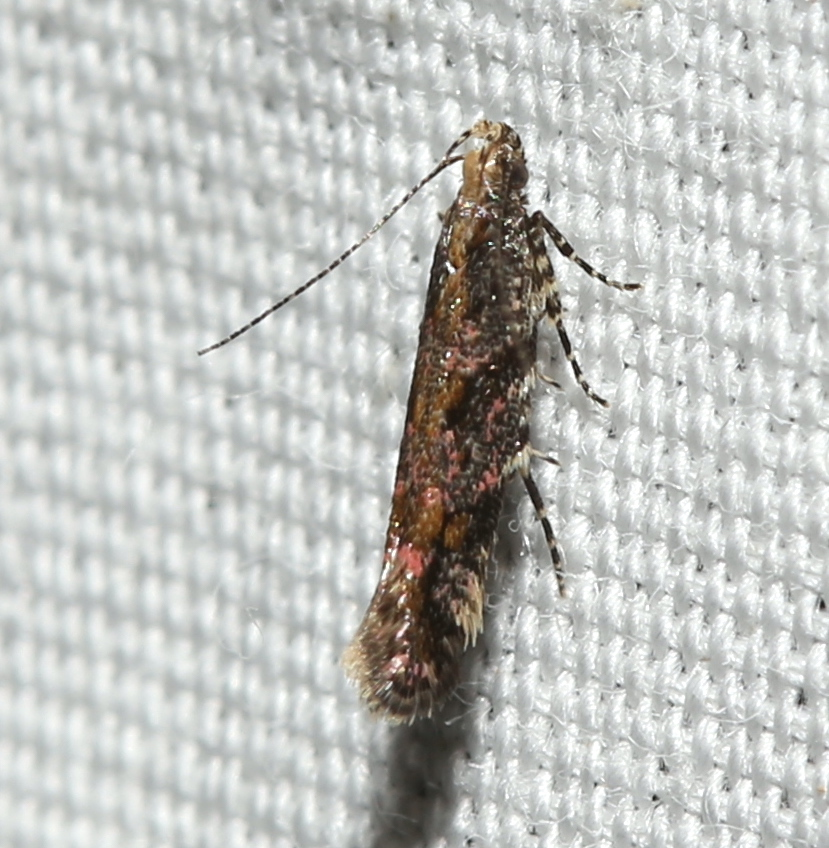

Scientific classification
- Kingdom: Animalia
- Phylum: Arthropoda
- Clade: Pancrustacea
- Class: Insecta
- Order: Lepidoptera
- Family: Gelechiidae
- Genus: Aristotelia
- Species: A. rubidella

Binomial name
- Aristotelia rubidella (Clemens, 1860)

Synonyms
- Gelechia rubidella Clemens, 1860; Gelechia rubensella Chambers, 1872

= Aristotelia rubidella =

Species of moth

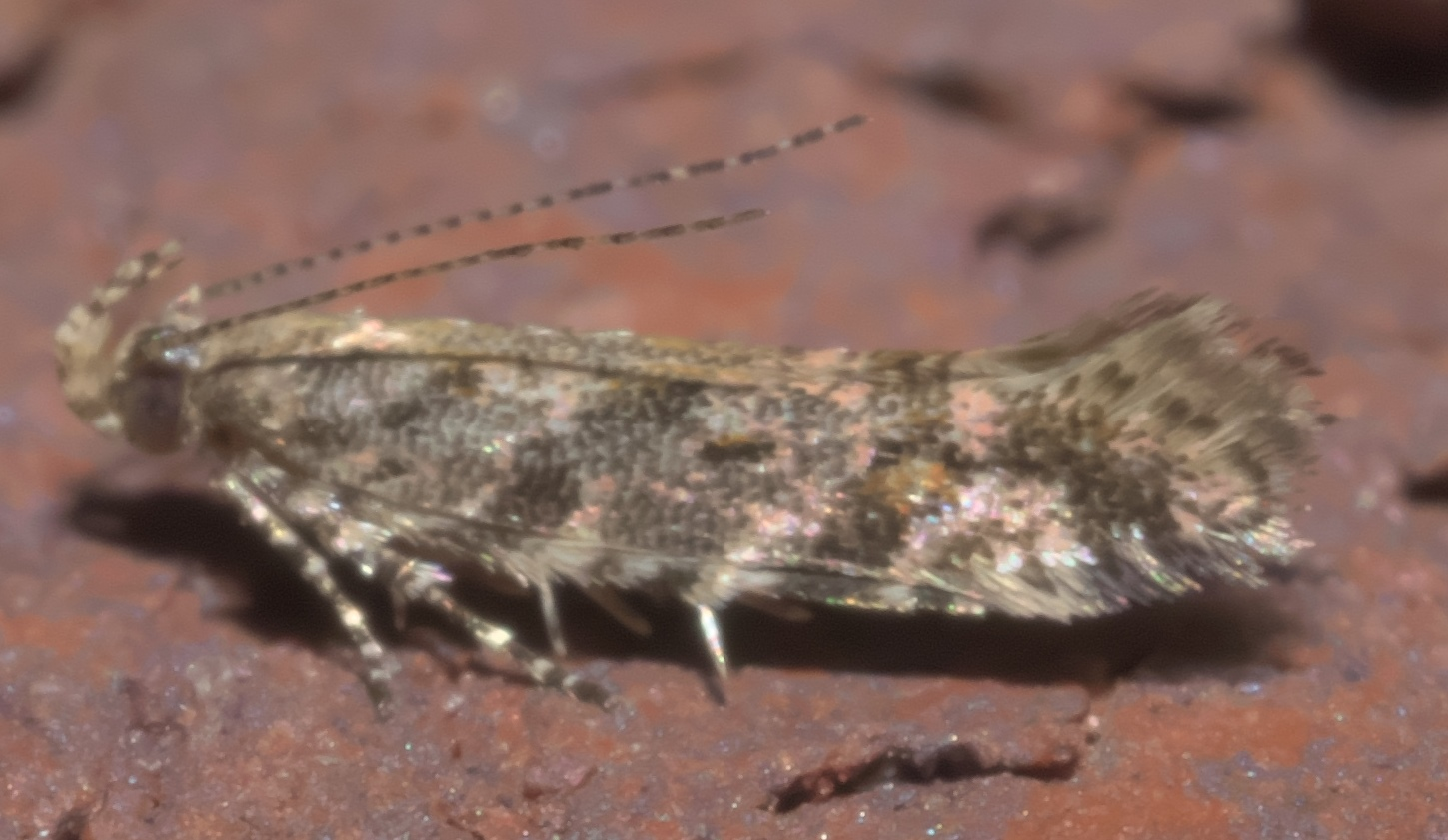
Aristotelia rubidella, Hodges #1762, Size: 4.3 mm

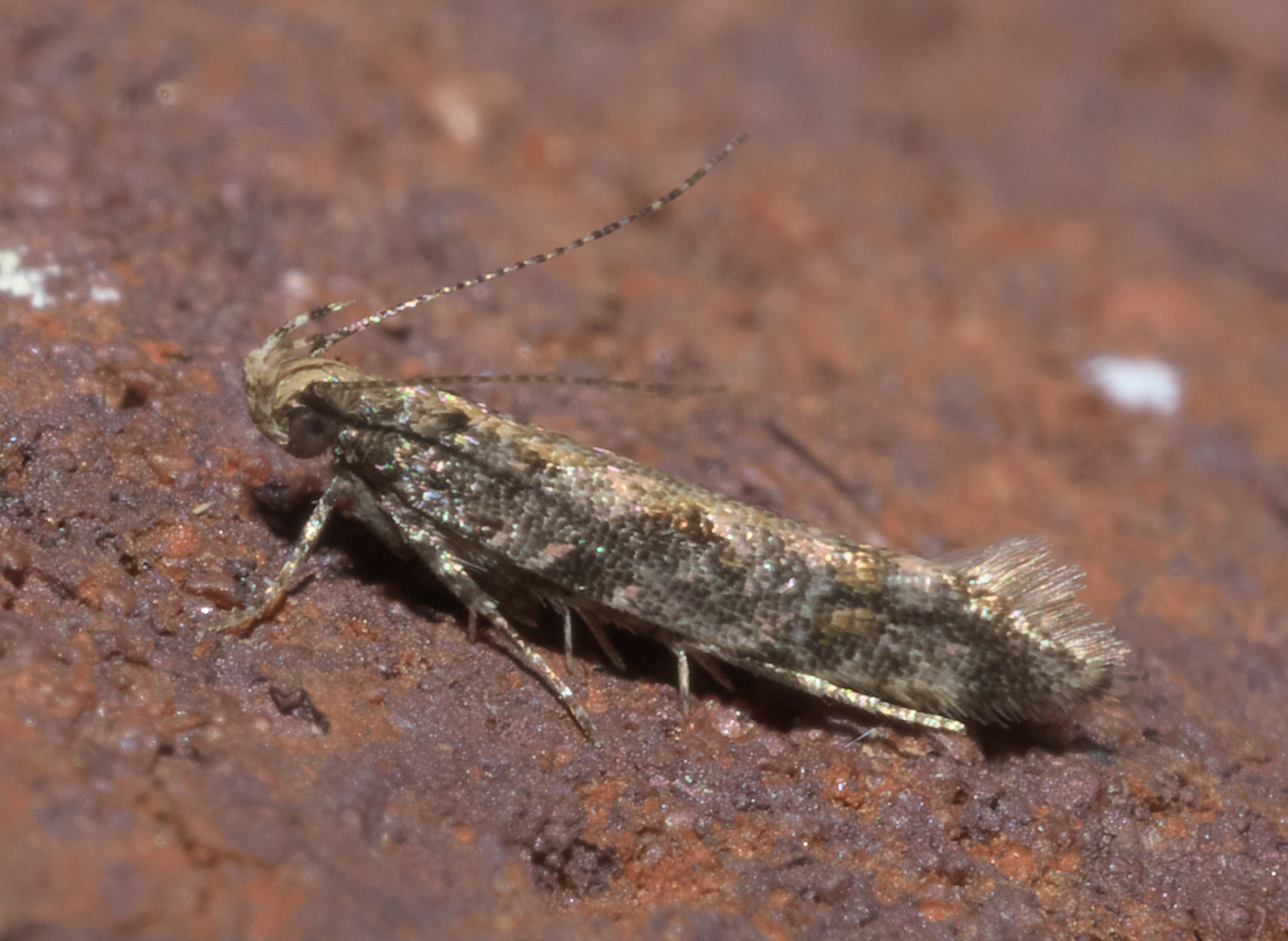
Aristotelia rubidella, Hodges #1762, Size: 5.0 mm

Aristotelia rubidella is a moth of the family Gelechiidae. It was described by James Brackenridge Clemens in 1860. It is found in North America, where it has been recorded from Alabama, Alberta, Arkansas, British Columbia, California, Florida, Georgia, Illinois, Indiana, Iowa, Kentucky, Louisiana, Maine, Manitoba, Maryland, Massachusetts, Michigan, Mississippi, New Jersey, North Carolina, Ohio, Oklahoma, Ontario, Quebec, South Carolina, Tennessee, Texas, Virginia, Washington, West Virginia and Wisconsin.

The forewings are roseate, dusted with deep fuscous, with a brownish-ocherous streak along the inner margin from the base to nearly the middle of the wing, and interrupted about its middle by a roseate hue. At the basal third of the wing is an oblique deep fuscous band, extending from the costa to the fold, and beyond the middle of the costa is a spot of the same hue, joined toward the inner margin by a brownish-ocherous spot. The apical portion of the wing much dusted with deep fuscous. The hindwings are blackish gray.
