= Aristotelia pantalaena =

Scientific classification
- Kingdom: Animalia
- Phylum: Arthropoda
- Clade: Pancrustacea
- Class: Insecta
- Order: Lepidoptera
- Family: Gelechiidae
- Genus: Aristotelia
- Species: A. pantalaena

Binomial name
- Aristotelia pantalaena (Walsingham, 1911)

Synonyms
- Untomia pantalaena Walsingham, 1911

Species of moth

Aristotelia pantalaena is a moth of the family Gelechiidae. It was described by Thomas de Grey, 6th Baron Walsingham, in 1911. It is found in Mexico (Tabasco).

The wingspan is about 10 mm. The forewings are brownish ochreous, paler along the costa, with a tawny suffusion spreading from the base below the middle to the apex and dorsum, and minutely speckled with blackish scales. At the commencement of the costal cilia is a blackish spot. There is a smaller one in the middle of the fold and a very small one at the base of the costa, and a faint indication of another a little beyond the end of the cell. A few blackish scales are distributed around the obtuse apex and obliquely rounded termen before the brownish ochreous cilia. The hindwings are dull brownish fuscous.
