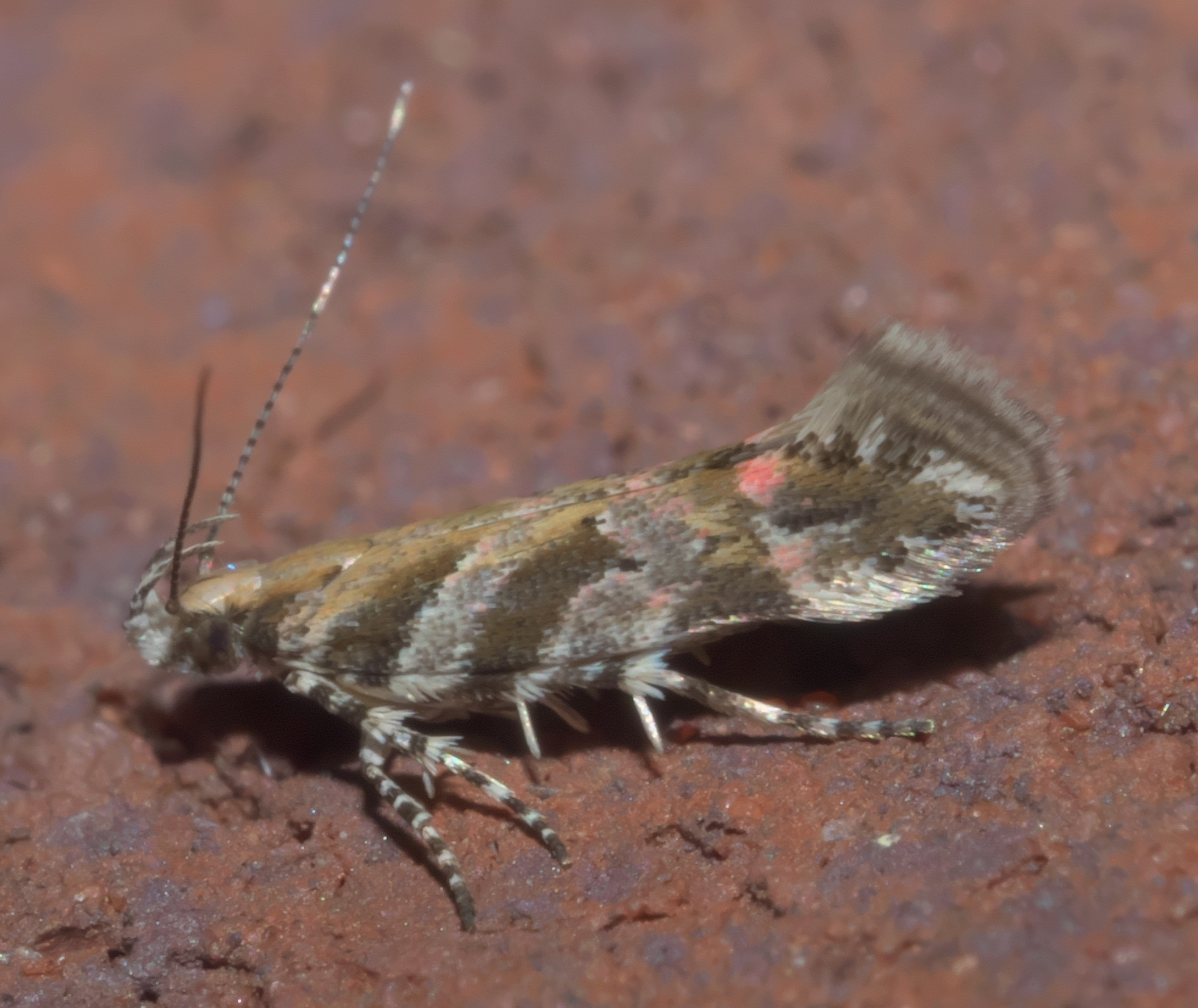
- Aristotelia lespedezae, Oklahoma

Scientific classification
- Kingdom: Animalia
- Phylum: Arthropoda
- Clade: Pancrustacea
- Class: Insecta
- Order: Lepidoptera
- Family: Gelechiidae
- Genus: Aristotelia
- Species: A. lespedezae

Binomial name
- Aristotelia lespedezae Braun, 1930

= Aristotelia lespedezae =

Species of moth

Aristotelia lespedezae is a moth of the family Gelechiidae. It was described by Annette Frances Braun in 1930. It is found in the United States, east of the Rocky Mountains.

Adults are on wing from late May to October in Kentucky.

The larvae probably feed on Lespedeza species.
