= Aristotelia trematias =

Scientific classification
- Kingdom: Animalia
- Phylum: Arthropoda
- Clade: Pancrustacea
- Class: Insecta
- Order: Lepidoptera
- Family: Gelechiidae
- Genus: Aristotelia
- Species: A. trematias

Binomial name
- Aristotelia trematias Meyrick, 1913

Species of moth

Aristotelia trematias is a moth of the family Gelechiidae. It was described by Edward Meyrick in 1913. It is found in South Africa, where it has been recorded from Mpumalanga.

The wingspan is about 12 mm. The forewings are light fuscous irrorated (sprinkled) with dark fuscous. The stigmata are rather large, blackish, the plical obliquely before the first discal, these two elongate. The hindwings are light grey.
