= Aristotelia ochrostephana =

Scientific classification
- Kingdom: Animalia
- Phylum: Arthropoda
- Clade: Pancrustacea
- Class: Insecta
- Order: Lepidoptera
- Family: Gelechiidae
- Genus: Aristotelia
- Species: A. ochrostephana

Binomial name
- Aristotelia ochrostephana Turner, 1933

Species of moth

Aristotelia ochrostephana is a moth of the family Gelechiidae. It was described by Alfred Jefferis Turner in 1933. It is found in Australia, where it has been recorded from South Australia.
