= Aristotelia trossulella =

Scientific classification
- Kingdom: Animalia
- Phylum: Arthropoda
- Clade: Pancrustacea
- Class: Insecta
- Order: Lepidoptera
- Family: Gelechiidae
- Genus: Aristotelia
- Species: A. trossulella

Binomial name
- Aristotelia trossulella Walsingham, 1897

Species of moth

Aristotelia trossulella is a moth of the family Gelechiidae. It was described by Thomas de Grey, 6th Baron Walsingham, in 1897. It is found in Jamaica and Haiti.

The wingspan is about 10 mm. The forewings are bright olive-brown, from the extreme base an oblique leaden-grey line extends downwards to the dorsum at one-fifth. Beyond it an oblique black line leaving the costa at one-fifth reaches nearly to the dorsum, accompanied throughout on its outer edge by a pinkish-ochreous line followed by steel-grey scales. A patch of steel-grey scales a little before the middle of the costa scarcely reaches beyond the upper margin of the cell, and is followed beyond the middle by a small pinkish-ochreous costal dot connected by some steel-grey scales with an inwardly oblique pinkish-ochreous line reverting towards the middle of the dorsum, black-margined on its inner edge and with steel-grey scales externally. Some spots of steel-grey scales lie a little above the tornus, others being scattered around the termen and the inner extremities of a series of pinkish ochreous spots which, to the number of about seven, follow the margin of the wing at the base of the costal and terminal cilia and are separated by some dark fuscous scales. The hindwings are grey.
