= Aristotelia melanaphra =

Scientific classification
- Kingdom: Animalia
- Phylum: Arthropoda
- Clade: Pancrustacea
- Class: Insecta
- Order: Lepidoptera
- Family: Gelechiidae
- Genus: Aristotelia
- Species: A. melanaphra

Binomial name
- Aristotelia melanaphra Meyrick, 1923

Species of moth

Aristotelia melanaphra is a moth of the family Gelechiidae. It was described by Edward Meyrick in 1923. It is found in North America, where it has been recorded from California.

The wingspan is about 11 mm. The forewings are rather dark violet grey with the stigmata faintly darker, the plical obliquely before the first discal. There is a cloudy white dot on the costa at two-thirds, and a fainter one on the tornus hardly before it. The apical area has blackish reflections. The hindwings are bluish grey.
