= Aristotelia palamota =

Scientific classification
- Kingdom: Animalia
- Phylum: Arthropoda
- Clade: Pancrustacea
- Class: Insecta
- Order: Lepidoptera
- Family: Gelechiidae
- Genus: Aristotelia
- Species: A. palamota

Binomial name
- Aristotelia palamota Meyrick, 1926

Species of moth

Aristotelia palamota is a moth of the family Gelechiidae. It was described by Edward Meyrick in 1926. It is found in what was then Bengal.

The wingspan is about 8 mm. The forewings are leaden grey sprinkled dark fuscous, with a broad irregular ochreous dorsal stripe from the base to the tornus, on the anterior half partially suffused with grey whitish and interrupted by an irregular pale silvery spot posteriorly. There is a small blackish spot on the base of the costa and an oblique dark fuscous spot above the dorsal stripe towards the base, and an oblique dark fuscous fasciate streak from the costa at one-third, terminating in an indentation of the dorsal stripe, black at the apex and white-edged posteriorly (plical stigma). The discal stigmata are black, approximated, the first obliquely beyond the plical, the dorsal stripe reaching these, a spot of silvery suffusion between the discal stigmata, and an ochreous-fulvous spot above the second, above this some dark fuscous suffusion along the costa. There is a black mark before the apex, preceded by a small ochreous-fulvous spot, some indistinct irregular silvery marking around these and dots on the apical and terminal margin. The hindwings are slaty grey.
