= Aristotelia aphiltra =

Scientific classification
- Kingdom: Animalia
- Phylum: Arthropoda
- Clade: Pancrustacea
- Class: Insecta
- Order: Lepidoptera
- Family: Gelechiidae
- Genus: Aristotelia
- Species: A. aphiltra

Binomial name
- Aristotelia aphiltra Meyrick, 1917

Species of moth

Aristotelia aphiltra is a moth of the family Gelechiidae. It was described by Edward Meyrick in 1917. It is found in Peru, Colombia and Ecuador.

The wingspan is 10–12 mm. The forewings are grey sprinkled with dark fuscous and whitish, the dorsal area suffused with brownish ochreous. There are oblique dark fuscous bars from the costa at one-sixth and one-third to the fold, the space between these sometimes more mixed with white. There is also a dark fuscous trapezoidal blotch narrowed downwards on the costa about two-thirds, edged beneath by a brownish-ochreous spot, beyond this a white spot on the costa, produced along the margin of the blotch, followed by a dark fuscous apical blotch. The hindwings are grey.
