= Aristotelia ptilastis =

Scientific classification
- Kingdom: Animalia
- Phylum: Arthropoda
- Clade: Pancrustacea
- Class: Insecta
- Order: Lepidoptera
- Family: Gelechiidae
- Genus: Aristotelia
- Species: A. ptilastis

Binomial name
- Aristotelia ptilastis Meyrick, 1909

Species of moth

Aristotelia ptilastis is a moth of the family Gelechiidae. It was described by Edward Meyrick in 1909. It is found in South Africa, where it has been recorded from the Western Cape.

The wingspan is about 11 mm. The forewings are rather dark fuscous irrorated (sprinkled) with white and with a dark fuscous dot towards the costa near the base. There are four costal spots of brown suffusion irrorated with black, becoming larger posteriorly, the first very small, the fourth ante-apical and large. Obliquely beyond the first three of these are three subdorsal tufts of scales, mixed with black anteriorly, white posteriorly, the third preceded by a yellow-ochreous spot and the second and third costal spots edged beneath by yellow-ochreous spots. There is also a small yellow-ochreous spot with two or three raised black scales in the middle of the disc. The hindwings are light grey.
