= Aristotelia balanocentra =

Scientific classification
- Kingdom: Animalia
- Phylum: Arthropoda
- Clade: Pancrustacea
- Class: Insecta
- Order: Lepidoptera
- Family: Gelechiidae
- Genus: Aristotelia
- Species: A. balanocentra

Binomial name
- Aristotelia balanocentra Meyrick, 1914

Species of moth

Aristotelia balanocentra is a moth of the family Gelechiidae. It was described by Edward Meyrick in 1914. It is found in South Africa, where it has been recorded from KwaZulu-Natal.

The wingspan is 11 to 12 millimetres (0.43 to 0.47 in). The forewings are fuscous irregularly mixed with dark fuscous and with a blackish dot beneath the costa at one-sixth, one obliquely beneath and beyond it, a larger one beneath the costa beyond one-third, a black dash on the fold beneath this, and an elongate dot in the disc at two-thirds. The hindwings are pale grey.
