= Aristotelia veteranella =

Scientific classification
- Kingdom: Animalia
- Phylum: Arthropoda
- Clade: Pancrustacea
- Class: Insecta
- Order: Lepidoptera
- Family: Gelechiidae
- Genus: Aristotelia
- Species: A. veteranella

Binomial name
- Aristotelia veteranella (Zeller, 1877)

Synonyms
- Gelechia (Tachyptilia) veteranella Zeller, 1877

Species of moth

Aristotelia veteranella is a moth of the family Gelechiidae. It was described by Philipp Christoph Zeller in 1877. It is found in Central America.
