= Aristotelia cynthia =

Scientific classification
- Kingdom: Animalia
- Phylum: Arthropoda
- Clade: Pancrustacea
- Class: Insecta
- Order: Lepidoptera
- Family: Gelechiidae
- Genus: Aristotelia
- Species: A. cynthia

Binomial name
- Aristotelia cynthia Meyrick, 1917

Species of moth

Aristotelia cynthia is a moth of the family Gelechiidae. It was described by Edward Meyrick in 1917. It is found in Peru.

The wingspan is 10–12 mm. The forewings are white irrorated (sprinkled) with dark fuscous, the dorsal half suffused with grey and partially mixed with ochreous. There are broad blackish-fuscous oblique bars from the costa at one-sixth and one-third to the fold, the second margined beneath by a brownish-ochreous mark. A subtriangular dark fuscous blotch is found on the costa beyond the middle, termmated beneath by a brownish-ochreous mark. There is also a suffused dark fuscous apical blotch, sometimes connected with preceding in the disc but separated from it on the costa by a whitish spot. The hindwings are dark slaty grey, pale in the cell.
