= Aristotelia vicana =

Scientific classification
- Kingdom: Animalia
- Phylum: Arthropoda
- Clade: Pancrustacea
- Class: Insecta
- Order: Lepidoptera
- Family: Gelechiidae
- Genus: Aristotelia
- Species: A. vicana

Binomial name
- Aristotelia vicana Meyrick, 1917

Species of moth

Aristotelia vicana is a moth of the family Gelechiidae. It was described by Edward Meyrick in 1917. It is found in Peru.

The wingspan is 10–11 mm. The forewings are light grey irrorated (sprinkled) with dark fuscous and with oblique dark fuscous bars from the costa at one-sixth and one-third terminated by black marks on the fold, the space between these suffused with white. There is a fascia of irregular white suffusion crossing the wing in the middle. The discal stigmata are black, the second forming an elongate mark, edged beneath by an elongate yellow-ochreous spot. There is an inwardly oblique triangular white spot on the costa at four-fifths, and a mark on tornus sometimes connected with it. Some undefined ochreous marking is found before the tornus and along the termen and there are two or three white margmal dots around the apex. The hindwings are grey.
