= Aristotelia coeruleopictella =

Scientific classification
- Kingdom: Animalia
- Phylum: Arthropoda
- Clade: Pancrustacea
- Class: Insecta
- Order: Lepidoptera
- Family: Gelechiidae
- Genus: Aristotelia
- Species: A. coeruleopictella

Binomial name
- Aristotelia coeruleopictella (Caradja, 1920)

Synonyms
- Xystophora coeruleopictella Caradja, 1920; Aristotelia calloptera Omelko, 1999

Species of moth

Aristotelia coeruleopictella is a moth of the family Gelechiidae. It is found in the Russian Far East.
