= Aristotelia aphthoropa =

Scientific classification
- Kingdom: Animalia
- Phylum: Arthropoda
- Clade: Pancrustacea
- Class: Insecta
- Order: Lepidoptera
- Family: Gelechiidae
- Genus: Aristotelia
- Species: A. aphthoropa

Binomial name
- Aristotelia aphthoropa Turner, 1939

Species of moth

Aristotelia aphthoropa is a moth of the family Gelechiidae. It was described by Alfred Jefferis Turner in 1939. It is found in Australia, where it has been recorded from Tasmania.

The wingspan is 12–13 mm.
