= Aristotelia antipala =

Scientific classification
- Kingdom: Animalia
- Phylum: Arthropoda
- Clade: Pancrustacea
- Class: Insecta
- Order: Lepidoptera
- Family: Gelechiidae
- Genus: Aristotelia
- Species: A. antipala

Binomial name
- Aristotelia antipala Meyrick, 1904

Species of moth

Aristotelia antipala is a moth of the family Gelechiidae. It was described by Edward Meyrick in 1904. It is found in Australia, where it has been recorded from New South Wales.

The wingspan is about 7 mm (0.28 in). The forewings are shining dark fuscous, slightly bronzy tinged and with a straight narrow whitish transverse fascia at two-thirds, constricted and just interrupted in the middle. The hindwings are dark fuscous.
