= Aristotelia aphromorpha =

Scientific classification
- Kingdom: Animalia
- Phylum: Arthropoda
- Clade: Pancrustacea
- Class: Insecta
- Order: Lepidoptera
- Family: Gelechiidae
- Genus: Aristotelia
- Species: A. aphromorpha

Binomial name
- Aristotelia aphromorpha Meyrick, 1923

Species of moth

Aristotelia aphromorpha is a moth of the family Gelechiidae. It was described by Edward Meyrick in 1923. It is found in Myanmar.

The wingspan is about 12 mm. The forewings are white irregularly sprinkled with grey and with markings of dark grey suffusion partially mixed black. There is a small spot on the costa near the base, a trapezoidal blotch on the dorsum about one-third reaching beyond the fold, a blotch on the costa before the middle, a very irregular fascia from the middle of the dorsum to three-fifths of the costa, and a flattened-triangular blotch on the tornus almost confluent with an apical blotch. The hindwings are grey.
