= Aristotelia molestella =

Scientific classification
- Kingdom: Animalia
- Phylum: Arthropoda
- Clade: Pancrustacea
- Class: Insecta
- Order: Lepidoptera
- Family: Gelechiidae
- Genus: Aristotelia
- Species: A. molestella

Binomial name
- Aristotelia molestella (Zeller, 1873)

Synonyms
- Gelechia (Ergatis) molestella Zeller, 1873

Species of moth

Aristotelia molestella is a moth of the family Gelechiidae. It was described by Philipp Christoph Zeller in 1873. It is found in North America, where it has been recorded from Texas.
