= Aristotelia macrothecta =

Scientific classification
- Kingdom: Animalia
- Phylum: Arthropoda
- Clade: Pancrustacea
- Class: Insecta
- Order: Lepidoptera
- Family: Gelechiidae
- Genus: Aristotelia
- Species: A. macrothecta

Binomial name
- Aristotelia macrothecta Meyrick, 1904

Species of moth

Aristotelia macrothecta is a moth of the family Gelechiidae. It was described by Edward Meyrick in 1904. It is found in Australia, where it has been recorded from New South Wales.

The wingspan is about 14 mm (0.55 in). The forewings are light bronzy fuscous, irrorated (sprinkled) with dark fuscous and with a dark fuscous dot on the base of the costa, two beneath the costa at one-sixth and one-third, and three on the fold obliquely beyond these respectively. There is an undefined longitudinal dark fuscous suffusion from between the last subcostal and plical dots beneath the middle of the disc to the apex, the upper edge with two dark fuscous prominences representing the discal stigmata. The hindwings are pale grey.
