= Aristotelia perfossa =

Scientific classification
- Kingdom: Animalia
- Phylum: Arthropoda
- Clade: Pancrustacea
- Class: Insecta
- Order: Lepidoptera
- Family: Gelechiidae
- Genus: Aristotelia
- Species: A. perfossa

Binomial name
- Aristotelia perfossa Meyrick, 1917

Synonyms
- Aristotelia radicata Meyrick, 1917

Species of moth

Aristotelia perfossa is a moth of the family Gelechiidae. It was described by Edward Meyrick in 1917. It is found in Colombia, Ecuador and Peru.

The wingspan is 10–12 mm. The forewings are whitish irrorated (sprinkled) with dark grey and with oblique bars of blackish suffusion from the costa at one-sixth and one-third, just crossing the fold, the plical stigma forming an elongate black mark on the end of the second. The discal stigmata are black, the first obliquely beyond the plical, the second indistinctly edged with ochreous beneath. There is a suffused white spot on the costa at four-fifths and there is sometimes some indistinct ochreous marking near the tornus. The hindwings are grey.
