= Aristotelia salicifungiella =

Scientific classification
- Kingdom: Animalia
- Phylum: Arthropoda
- Clade: Pancrustacea
- Class: Insecta
- Order: Lepidoptera
- Family: Gelechiidae
- Genus: Aristotelia
- Species: A. salicifungiella

Binomial name
- Aristotelia salicifungiella (Clemens, 1865)

Synonyms
- Gelechia salicifungiella Clemens, 1865

Species of moth

Aristotelia salicifungiella is a moth of the family Gelechiidae. It was described by James Brackenridge Clemens in 1865. It is found in North America, where it has been recorded from California, Illinois, Ohio and Ontario.

The forewings are red, irregularly marked with whitish. Near the base is a whitish band powdered with dark fuscous, which curves across the fold, including the inner margin, and reaches the middle of the wing. The part beneath the fold is tinged with reddish and sometimes with pale brownish. Adjoining this band exteriorly, is a dark brownish-red, curved band, which does not cross the fold. On the costa are three small white spots, one near the tip, one about the middle and one exterior to the brownish-red band. The margin of the wing is powdered with dark fuscous. The hindwings are dark grey.
