= Aristotelia psoraleae =

Scientific classification
- Kingdom: Animalia
- Phylum: Arthropoda
- Clade: Pancrustacea
- Class: Insecta
- Order: Lepidoptera
- Family: Gelechiidae
- Genus: Aristotelia
- Species: A. psoraleae

Binomial name
- Aristotelia psoraleae Braun, 1930

Species of moth

Aristotelia psoraleae is a moth of the family Gelechiidae. It was described by Annette Frances Braun in 1930. It is found in North America, where it has been recorded from California, Kentucky, Montana and Ohio.
