= Aristotelia chalybeiochroa =

Scientific classification
- Kingdom: Animalia
- Phylum: Arthropoda
- Clade: Pancrustacea
- Class: Insecta
- Order: Lepidoptera
- Family: Gelechiidae
- Genus: Aristotelia
- Species: A. chalybeiochroa

Binomial name
- Aristotelia chalybeiochroa (Walsingham, 1897)

Synonyms
- Eucatoptus chalybeiochroa Walsingham, 1897

Species of moth

Aristotelia chalybeiochroa is a moth of the family Gelechiidae. It was described by Thomas de Grey, 6th Baron Walsingham, in 1897. It is found in West Indies, where it has been recorded from St. Thomas.

The wingspan is about 9 mm. The forewings are brownish cinereous, with a steely gloss throughout and some ferruginous scaling, especially on the outer half. At the extreme base of the costa is a small dark fuscous spot, narrowly connected with an oblique narrow broken fascia of the same colour, extending outwards to the dorsum, which it reaches at about one-fourth the wing-length. Beyond this is a minute black spot on the outer half of the fold, the remainder of the wing to the apex being speckled with black scales, some preceded by whitish and on the costa before the apex is an elongate shining whitish spot, followed by black speckling around the base of the terminal cilia which partake of the wing-colour, but tending to pale grey at the tornus, with a dark shade running around their extreme tips. The hindwings are shining pale steel-grey.
