= Aristotelia eurypsola =

Scientific classification
- Kingdom: Animalia
- Phylum: Arthropoda
- Clade: Pancrustacea
- Class: Insecta
- Order: Lepidoptera
- Family: Gelechiidae
- Genus: Aristotelia
- Species: A. eurypsola

Binomial name
- Aristotelia eurypsola Turner, 1919

Species of moth

Aristotelia eurypsola is a moth of the family Gelechiidae. It was described by Alfred Jefferis Turner in 1919. It is found in Australia, where it has been recorded from New South Wales.

The wingspan is about 16 mm. The forewings are fuscous with dark-fuscous markings and an oblique line from the costa near the base to the fold, as well as a costal dot at one-fourth, an irregular discal blotch before the middle, limited beneath by the fold and another blotch at the tornus. There is also a costal dot at two-thirds, and an apical suffusion. The hindwings are dark-grey.
