= Aristotelia epicharta =

Scientific classification
- Kingdom: Animalia
- Phylum: Arthropoda
- Clade: Pancrustacea
- Class: Insecta
- Order: Lepidoptera
- Family: Gelechiidae
- Genus: Aristotelia
- Species: A. epicharta

Binomial name
- Aristotelia epicharta Turner, 1919

Species of moth

Aristotelia epicharta is a moth of the family Gelechiidae. It was described by Alfred Jefferis Turner in 1919. It is found in Australia, where it has been recorded from New South Wales.

The wingspan is about 9 mm. The forewings are whitish sparsely irrorated with fuscous and with an ochreous streak irrorated with fuscous on the costa from the middle to three-fourths, giving off at its extremity a transverse fascia to the tornus, interrupted in the middle. There is also an ochreous terminal line and the terminal edge is irrorated with blackish. A blackish dot is found at the apex. The hindwings are whitish-grey.
