= Aristotelia swierstrae =

Scientific classification
- Kingdom: Animalia
- Phylum: Arthropoda
- Clade: Pancrustacea
- Class: Insecta
- Order: Lepidoptera
- Family: Gelechiidae
- Genus: Aristotelia
- Species: A. swierstrae

Binomial name
- Aristotelia swierstrae Janse, 1950

Species of moth

Aristotelia swierstrae is a moth of the family Gelechiidae. It was described by Anthonie Johannes Theodorus Janse in 1950. It is found in Mozambique.
