= Aristotelia lindanella =

Scientific classification
- Kingdom: Animalia
- Phylum: Arthropoda
- Clade: Pancrustacea
- Class: Insecta
- Order: Lepidoptera
- Family: Gelechiidae
- Genus: Aristotelia
- Species: A. lindanella

Binomial name
- Aristotelia lindanella Barnes & Busck, 1920

Species of moth

Aristotelia lindanella is a moth of the family Gelechiidae. It was described by William Barnes and August Busck in 1920. It is found in North America, where it has been recorded from California.

The wingspan is 10–11 mm. The forewings are yellowish white with the extreme base of the costa black. There is a broad blackish-brown transverse fascia at the basal third, slightly nearer the base at the costa than on the dorsal edge. A similar broader fascia is found at the apical third, strongly overlaid with brick red on the dorsal half and touching on the dorsal edge a third broad fascia across the tip of the wing, which is nearly all brick red with only the costal end blackish brown. The tip of the wing is white with a few scattered brown scales. The hindwings are light whitish fuscous.
