= Aristotelia resinosa =

Scientific classification
- Kingdom: Animalia
- Phylum: Arthropoda
- Clade: Pancrustacea
- Class: Insecta
- Order: Lepidoptera
- Family: Gelechiidae
- Genus: Aristotelia
- Species: A. resinosa

Binomial name
- Aristotelia resinosa Meyrick, 1918

Species of moth

Aristotelia resinosa is a moth of the family Gelechiidae. It was described by Edward Meyrick in 1918. It is found in Assam, India.

The wingspan is about 12 mm. The forewings are deep fuscous purple with the dorsal edge shortly ochreous yellow near the base and with a slender ochreous-yellow streak mixed ferruginous brown along the fold throughout. A blackish dot is found on the lower edge of this at one-fifth of the wing, and one beneath the costa before one-third, finely edged with yellowish posteriorly. The stigmata are black, the plical obliquely before the first discal, the discal connected by a slender ochreous-yellow streak continued along the termen to the apex. Two or three small undefined yellowish dots are found on the costa posteriorly. The hindwings are grey.
