= Aristotelia sarcodes =

Scientific classification
- Kingdom: Animalia
- Phylum: Arthropoda
- Clade: Pancrustacea
- Class: Insecta
- Order: Lepidoptera
- Family: Gelechiidae
- Genus: Aristotelia
- Species: A. sarcodes

Binomial name
- Aristotelia sarcodes Walsingham, 1910

Species of moth

Aristotelia sarcodes is a moth of the family Gelechiidae. It was described by Thomas de Grey, 6th Baron Walsingham, in 1910. It is found in Panama and on the Galapagos Islands.

The wingspan is about 10 mm. The forewings are yellowish brown, or light rust-brown, with white and shining silvery costal and dorsal streaks, more or less confluent on the wing-middle, and with two, noticeable, rosy flesh-coloured, short length-streaks, one at the upper edge of the outer end of the cell, the other wider, beyond the end of the cell. There is a rather oblique white costal streak, at one-fifth, with a few black scales along its inner edge, its outer half touched with shining silvery. This meets the apex of a short silvery dorsal streak, at about one-fourth, and is followed by a second, shorter, silvery and white costal streak to which there is no corresponding dorsal one. A third, silvery and white costal streak, is scarcely beyond the middle, and is interrupted by the first rosy flesh-coloured streak before joining a longer silvery oblique streak from the middle of the dorsum; beyond this again are four short white costal streaks before the apex, the first two sometimes confluent, and both tipped with silvery, the second rosy flesh-coloured length-streak separating them from a long silvery dorsal streak arising obliquely outward from near the tornus. There are also a few silvery scales on the termen below the outer white costal streak which occupies the apex and apical cilia. The terminal cilia is whitish, touched with brown on the middle of the termen and at the tornus. The hindwings are dark slaty grey, with a strong rosy iridescence.
