= Aristotelia epacria =

Scientific classification
- Kingdom: Animalia
- Phylum: Arthropoda
- Clade: Pancrustacea
- Class: Insecta
- Order: Lepidoptera
- Family: Gelechiidae
- Genus: Aristotelia
- Species: A. epacria

Binomial name
- Aristotelia epacria Bradley, 1965

Species of moth

Aristotelia epacria is a moth of the family Gelechiidae. It was described by John David Bradley in 1965 and is found in Uganda.
