= Aristotelia billii =

Scientific classification
- Kingdom: Animalia
- Phylum: Arthropoda
- Clade: Pancrustacea
- Class: Insecta
- Order: Lepidoptera
- Family: Gelechiidae
- Genus: Aristotelia
- Species: A. billii

Binomial name
- Aristotelia billii Varenne & J. Nel, 2013

Species of moth

Aristotelia billii is a moth of the family Gelechiidae. It is found in France.
