= Aristotelia furtiva =

Scientific classification
- Kingdom: Animalia
- Phylum: Arthropoda
- Clade: Pancrustacea
- Class: Insecta
- Order: Lepidoptera
- Family: Gelechiidae
- Genus: Aristotelia
- Species: A. furtiva

Binomial name
- Aristotelia furtiva Meyrick, 1904

Species of moth

Aristotelia furtiva is a moth of the family Gelechiidae. It was described by Edward Meyrick in 1904. It is found in Australia, where it has been recorded from eastern mainland Australia and Tasmania.

The wingspan is 11–12 mm (0.43–0.47 in). The forewings are fuscous, slightly purplish tinged, sprinkled with dark fuscous and with a dark fuscous spot on the fold at one-fourth, and one beneath the costa at one-third. The stigmata are moderate, dark fuscous, the plical very obliquely before the first discal, which is in the middle. The hindwings are light grey.
