= Aristotelia schistopa =

Scientific classification
- Kingdom: Animalia
- Phylum: Arthropoda
- Clade: Pancrustacea
- Class: Insecta
- Order: Lepidoptera
- Family: Gelechiidae
- Genus: Aristotelia
- Species: A. schistopa

Binomial name
- Aristotelia schistopa Diakonoff, 1954

Synonyms
- Xystophora schistopa

Species of moth

Aristotelia schistopa is a moth of the family Gelechiidae. It was described by Alexey Diakonoff in 1954. It is found in New Guinea.
