= Aristotelia aquosa =

Scientific classification
- Kingdom: Animalia
- Phylum: Arthropoda
- Clade: Pancrustacea
- Class: Insecta
- Order: Lepidoptera
- Family: Gelechiidae
- Genus: Aristotelia
- Species: A. aquosa

Binomial name
- Aristotelia aquosa Meyrick, 1925

Synonyms
- Gelechia suffusella Chambers, 1872 (preocc. Douglas, 1850)

Species of moth

Aristotelia aquosa is a moth of the family Gelechiidae. It was described by Edward Meyrick in 1925. It is found in North America, where it has been recorded from Kentucky.

The forewings are pale ochreous, suffused near the base with pale fuscous, behind which is an oblique pale band across the wing, and behind that an oblique fuscous band, behind which the wing is paler again, with another large pale fuscous patch before the beginning of the costal cilia, and the apex dusted with fuscous. The whole wing is suffused, according to the light, with roseate, silvery, pale golden or pale green. The golden tinge is most distinct along the dorsal margin.
