= Aristotelia achyrobathra =

Scientific classification
- Kingdom: Animalia
- Phylum: Arthropoda
- Clade: Pancrustacea
- Class: Insecta
- Order: Lepidoptera
- Family: Gelechiidae
- Genus: Aristotelia
- Species: A. achyrobathra

Binomial name
- Aristotelia achyrobathra Meyrick, 1933

Species of moth

Aristotelia achyrobathra is a moth of the family Gelechiidae. It was described by Edward Meyrick in 1933. It is found in the Democratic Republic of the Congo (Katanga).
