= Aristotelia crypsixantha =

Scientific classification
- Kingdom: Animalia
- Phylum: Arthropoda
- Clade: Pancrustacea
- Class: Insecta
- Order: Lepidoptera
- Family: Gelechiidae
- Genus: Aristotelia
- Species: A. crypsixantha

Binomial name
- Aristotelia crypsixantha Turner, 1919

Species of moth

Aristotelia crypsixantha is a moth of the family Gelechiidae. It was described by Alfred Jefferis Turner in 1919. It is found in Australia, where it has been recorded from New South Wales.

The wingspan is 12–13 mm. The forewings are grey with obscure ochreous streaks from the base beneath the costa to one-third, along the fold, and in the middle from one-third to the termen. There is a short blackish streak on the fold near the base and a blackish discal dot at one-third and sometimes another at two-thirds. Some blackish scales are found at the apex. The hindwings are grey.
