= Aristotelia calens =

Scientific classification
- Kingdom: Animalia
- Phylum: Arthropoda
- Clade: Pancrustacea
- Class: Insecta
- Order: Lepidoptera
- Family: Gelechiidae
- Genus: Aristotelia
- Species: A. calens

Binomial name
- Aristotelia calens Meyrick, 1923

Species of moth

Aristotelia calens is a moth of the family Gelechiidae. It was described by Edward Meyrick in 1923. It is found in North America, where it has been recorded from California.

The wingspan is about 11 mm. The forewings are brown, at one-fourth an oblique white fascia is suffusedly irrorated (sprinkled) with grey, preceded by small black spots on the costa and fold, a black streak on the fold connecting this with a very irregular angulated white median fascia irrorated grey, widest on the costa, its angle edged anteriorly by a black dot (the first discal stigma). The costa is suffused dark grey between this and a white dark-centred spot at three-fourths, where a narrow irregular inwards-oblique fascia of white and grey irroration runs to the tornus. The hindwings are grey.
