= Aristotelia eupatoriella =

Scientific classification
- Kingdom: Animalia
- Phylum: Arthropoda
- Clade: Pancrustacea
- Class: Insecta
- Order: Lepidoptera
- Family: Gelechiidae
- Genus: Aristotelia
- Species: A. eupatoriella

Binomial name
- Aristotelia eupatoriella Busck, [1934]

Species of moth

Aristotelia eupatoriella is a moth of the family Gelechiidae. It was described by August Busck in 1934. It is found in Cuba.

The larvae feed on Eupatorium species, including Eupatorium villosum.
