= Aristotelia condensata =

Scientific classification
- Kingdom: Animalia
- Phylum: Arthropoda
- Clade: Pancrustacea
- Class: Insecta
- Order: Lepidoptera
- Family: Gelechiidae
- Genus: Aristotelia
- Species: A. condensata

Binomial name
- Aristotelia condensata Meyrick, 1928

Species of moth

Aristotelia condensata is a moth of the family Gelechiidae. It was described by Edward Meyrick in 1928. It is found in the Atlas Mountains.
