= Aristotelia montarcella =

Scientific classification
- Kingdom: Animalia
- Phylum: Arthropoda
- Clade: Pancrustacea
- Class: Insecta
- Order: Lepidoptera
- Family: Gelechiidae
- Genus: Aristotelia
- Species: A. montarcella

Binomial name
- Aristotelia montarcella A. Schmidt, 1941

Species of moth

Aristotelia montarcella is a moth of the family Gelechiidae. It is found in Spain.
