= Aristotelia rhamnina =

Scientific classification
- Kingdom: Animalia
- Phylum: Arthropoda
- Clade: Pancrustacea
- Class: Insecta
- Order: Lepidoptera
- Family: Gelechiidae
- Genus: Aristotelia
- Species: A. rhamnina

Binomial name
- Aristotelia rhamnina Keifer, 1933

Species of moth

Aristotelia rhamnina is a moth of the family Gelechiidae. It was described by Keifer in 1933. It is found in North America, where it has been recorded from California.
