= Aristotelia howardi =

Scientific classification
- Kingdom: Animalia
- Phylum: Arthropoda
- Clade: Pancrustacea
- Class: Insecta
- Order: Lepidoptera
- Family: Gelechiidae
- Genus: Aristotelia
- Species: A. howardi

Binomial name
- Aristotelia howardi Walsingham, 1909

Species of moth

Aristotelia howardi is a moth of the family Gelechiidae. It was described by Walsingham in 1909. It is found in Mexico (Sonora) and California.

The wingspan is about 13.5 mm. The forewings are milk-white, tinged with rosy pink along the costa, except at the base and along the dorsum beyond the middle. At the base is a tawny-red patch, wider on the dorsum than on the costa, narrowly darkened to black along its oblique outer margin. After an oblique fascia of the white ground-colour, which is produced outward along the dorsum, where it is tinged with bright ochreous, a rather oblique, mixed black and reddish-grey streak descends from the costa at one-fourth, crossing the cell, and bent outward and upward at its lower extremity enclosing above it a patch of the ground-colour profusely stippled with pale rosy grey, bounded on its outer side by a darker, tawny reddish grey quadrangular costal spot, extending downward to an almost circular ochreous spot at the end of the cell. The terminal area is thickly sprinkled with rust-brown, and contains some black spots, notably two on the costa before the apex, in strong contrast to the rosy pink by which they are separated and partially surrounded. The hindwings are shining, steel-grey, with a bright rosy iridescence.
