= Aristotelia eldorada =

Scientific classification
- Kingdom: Animalia
- Phylum: Arthropoda
- Clade: Pancrustacea
- Class: Insecta
- Order: Lepidoptera
- Family: Gelechiidae
- Genus: Aristotelia
- Species: A. eldorada

Binomial name
- Aristotelia eldorada Keifer, 1936

Species of moth

Aristotelia eldorada is a moth of the family Gelechiidae. It was described by Keifer in 1936. It is found in North America, where it has been recorded from California.
