= Aristotelia hemisarca =

Scientific classification
- Kingdom: Animalia
- Phylum: Arthropoda
- Clade: Pancrustacea
- Class: Insecta
- Order: Lepidoptera
- Family: Gelechiidae
- Genus: Aristotelia
- Species: A. hemisarca

Binomial name
- Aristotelia hemisarca Lower, 1916

Species of moth

Aristotelia hemisarca is a moth of the family Gelechiidae. It was described by Oswald Bertram Lower in 1916. It is found in Australia, where it has been recorded from New South Wales.

The wingspan is about 16 mm. The forewings are dull fuscous with obscure markings. There is a moderately broad outwardly oblique transverse whitish-ochreous fascia, from the costa at one-sixth to the dorsum at one-fifth, where it becomes confluent with a moderate ochreous-whitish dorsal streak, somewhat suffused, from near the base to the tornus. There is an obscurely-edged ochreous-whitish transverse fascia, from the costa at five-sixths to the tornus, separated from the dorsal streak by a patch of ground colour. There are four or five quadrate spots of ochreous white on the costa, between the posterior edge of the previous fascia and the apex, separated by similar-sized spots of ground colour. The hindwings are pale greyish.
