= Aristotelia erycina =

Scientific classification
- Kingdom: Animalia
- Phylum: Arthropoda
- Clade: Pancrustacea
- Class: Insecta
- Order: Lepidoptera
- Family: Gelechiidae
- Genus: Aristotelia
- Species: A. erycina

Binomial name
- Aristotelia erycina Meyrick, 1917

Species of moth

Aristotelia erycina is a moth of the family Gelechiidae. It was described by Edward Meyrick in 1917. It is found in Ecuador and Peru.

The wingspan is 9–10 mm. The forewings are pale greyish, suffusedly irrorated (sprinkled) with dark fuscous, irregularly tinged and spotted with light rose pink. There is a very oblique suffused blackish streak across the fold about one-fifth, and an oblique blackish streak from the costa to the plical stigma, the space between these and towards the dorsum anteriorly sometimes suffused with pale ochreous. The stigmata are black, rather elongate, the plical obliquely before the first discal. Two or three small pale marks are found on the costa towards the apex and there is a more or less developed longitudinal blackish streak from the second discal stigma. The hindwings are grey, in males with a streak of very fine blackish-grey striation along the submedian groove.
