= Aristotelia mirandella =

Scientific classification
- Kingdom: Animalia
- Phylum: Arthropoda
- Clade: Pancrustacea
- Class: Insecta
- Order: Lepidoptera
- Family: Gelechiidae
- Genus: Aristotelia
- Species: A. mirandella

Binomial name
- Aristotelia mirandella (Chrétien, 1908)

Synonyms
- Anacampsis mirandella Chrétien, 1908

Species of moth

Aristotelia mirandella is a species of moth in the family Gelechiidae. It was described by Pierre Chrétien in 1908. It is found in Algeria and has also been reported from Greece.
