= Aristotelia comis =

Scientific classification
- Kingdom: Animalia
- Phylum: Arthropoda
- Clade: Pancrustacea
- Class: Insecta
- Order: Lepidoptera
- Family: Gelechiidae
- Genus: Aristotelia
- Species: A. comis

Binomial name
- Aristotelia comis Meyrick, 1913

Species of moth

Aristotelia comis is a moth of the family Gelechiidae. It was described by Edward Meyrick in 1913. It is found in South Africa, where it has been recorded from Mpumalanga, Gauteng, Limpopo and KwaZulu-Natal.

The wingspan is about 11 mm. The forewings are grey irrorated (sprinkled) with whitish and blackish and with a small ochreous-brown spot in the disc near the base. There is an irregular blackish interrupted line crossing the wing near beyond this and there are two moderate ochreous-brown fasciae about one-third and two-thirds, edged with whitish, and irrorated with blackish towards the costa, the first oblique, its posterior edge with a strong prominence below the middle, surmounted by a black dot, the second direct, dilated towards the costa. A black longitudinal mark is found in the disc beyond this and there is an ochreous-brown apical spot, its angles produced along the costa and termen. The hindwings are grey.
