= Aristotelia pachnopis =

Scientific classification
- Kingdom: Animalia
- Phylum: Arthropoda
- Clade: Pancrustacea
- Class: Insecta
- Order: Lepidoptera
- Family: Gelechiidae
- Genus: Aristotelia
- Species: A. pachnopis

Binomial name
- Aristotelia pachnopis Meyrick, 1939

Species of moth

Aristotelia pachnopis is a moth of the family Gelechiidae. It was described by Edward Meyrick in 1939. It is found in Java, Indonesia.
