= Aristotelia frankeniae =

Scientific classification
- Kingdom: Animalia
- Phylum: Arthropoda
- Clade: Pancrustacea
- Class: Insecta
- Order: Lepidoptera
- Family: Gelechiidae
- Genus: Aristotelia
- Species: A. frankeniae

Binomial name
- Aristotelia frankeniae Walsingham, 1898

Species of moth

Aristotelia frankeniae is a moth of the family Gelechiidae. It is found in Spain and on Corsica.

The wingspan is 8–9 mm. Adults have been recorded on wing from mid May to the end of June.

The larvae have been recorded feeding on the shoots of Frankenia pulverulenta. They feed from within a web.
