= Aristotelia pamphaea =

Scientific classification
- Kingdom: Animalia
- Phylum: Arthropoda
- Clade: Pancrustacea
- Class: Insecta
- Order: Lepidoptera
- Family: Gelechiidae
- Genus: Aristotelia
- Species: A. pamphaea

Binomial name
- Aristotelia pamphaea Meyrick, 1904

Species of moth

Aristotelia pamphaea is a moth of the family Gelechiidae. It was described by Edward Meyrick in 1904. It is found in Australia, where it has been recorded from New South Wales.

The wingspan is 9–10 mm (0.35–0.39 in). The forewings are bronzy fuscous, irrorated (sprinkled) with dark fuscous. The hindwings are rather dark fuscous.
