= Aristotelia ochroxysta =

Scientific classification
- Kingdom: Animalia
- Phylum: Arthropoda
- Clade: Pancrustacea
- Class: Insecta
- Order: Lepidoptera
- Family: Gelechiidae
- Genus: Aristotelia
- Species: A. ochroxysta

Binomial name
- Aristotelia ochroxysta Meyrick, 1929

Species of moth

Aristotelia ochroxysta is a moth of the family Gelechiidae. It was described by Edward Meyrick in 1929. It is found in North America, where it has been recorded from Texas.

The wingspan is about 10 mm.
