= Aristotelia epimetalla =

Scientific classification
- Kingdom: Animalia
- Phylum: Arthropoda
- Clade: Pancrustacea
- Class: Insecta
- Order: Lepidoptera
- Family: Gelechiidae
- Genus: Aristotelia
- Species: A. epimetalla

Binomial name
- Aristotelia epimetalla Meyrick, 1904

Species of moth

Aristotelia epimetalla is a moth of the family Gelechiidae. It was described by Edward Meyrick in 1904. It is found in Australia, where it has been recorded from New South Wales.

The wingspan is 7–8 mm (0.28–0.31 in). The forewings are bright shining golden bronze with shining violet-bluish-silvery markings. There is a spot on the costa at one-fifth, reaching half across the wing and a spot on the discal fold before the middle, one beneath the costa beyond the middle, and one on the tornus. There is also an elongate spot on the costa about three-fourths. The hindwings are dark fuscous.
