= Aristotelia galeotis =

Scientific classification
- Kingdom: Animalia
- Phylum: Arthropoda
- Clade: Pancrustacea
- Class: Insecta
- Order: Lepidoptera
- Family: Gelechiidae
- Genus: Aristotelia
- Species: A. galeotis

Binomial name
- Aristotelia galeotis Meyrick, 1908

Species of moth

Aristotelia galeotis is a moth of the family Gelechiidae. It was described by Edward Meyrick in 1908. It is found in Sri Lanka and South Africa.

The wingspan is 7–8 mm. The forewings are brownish ochreous or yellow ochreous, paler towards the base, irregularly sprinkled with black and with a small round spot of black irroration (speckles) on the fold at one-third, another in the disc about the middle, a third on the costa at three-fifths, and a fourth rather larger and more triangular on the tornus. The hindwings are rather dark grey, thinly scaled in the disc.
