= Aristotelia paterata =

Scientific classification
- Kingdom: Animalia
- Phylum: Arthropoda
- Clade: Pancrustacea
- Class: Insecta
- Order: Lepidoptera
- Family: Gelechiidae
- Genus: Aristotelia
- Species: A. paterata

Binomial name
- Aristotelia paterata Meyrick, 1914

Species of moth

Aristotelia paterata is a moth of the family Gelechiidae. It was described by Edward Meyrick in 1914. It is found in Guyana and Peru.

The wingspan is 9–10 mm. The forewings are ochreous brown with the costal edge suffused with dark fuscous and with a small basal patch of grey irroration (speckles), with the edge oblique. There are two oblique fasciae of grey irroration edged with ochreous whitish from one-fourth and the middle of the costa, the first edged anteriorly with some black scales on the upper two-thirds, the second suffusedly connected with the first on the dorsum, its anterior edge with a central emargination (notches) bearing the black first discal stigma. The second discal stigma is elongate, black, edged beneath with white, connecting the preceding fascia with the anterior angle of an inwards-oblique rhomboidal pale ochreous blotch on the costa towards the apex, followed on the costa by a blackish dot. The apical and terminal edge are marked with several undefined whitish dots separated with some blackish scales. The hindwings are dark grey.
