= Aristotelia primipilana =

Scientific classification
- Kingdom: Animalia
- Phylum: Arthropoda
- Clade: Pancrustacea
- Class: Insecta
- Order: Lepidoptera
- Family: Gelechiidae
- Genus: Aristotelia
- Species: A. primipilana

Binomial name
- Aristotelia primipilana Meyrick, 1923

Species of moth

Aristotelia primipilana is a moth of the family Gelechiidae. It was described by Edward Meyrick in 1923. It is found in North America, where it has been recorded from Florida and Ontario.

The wingspan is 9–10 mm. The forewings are fulvous, with the costal edge infuscated, towards the apex blackish. There is a white basal dot beneath the costa and there are three slender silver-metallic fasciae becoming snow white towards the costa, the first at one-fourth, hardly curved, oblique and sometimes obsolescent on the dorsum, the second median, straight, and the third slightly incurved, from beyond three-fourths of the costa rather inwards-oblique to the tornus, with indistinct small black dots representing the stigmata, the plical on the anterior edge of the second fascia, the discal on the posterior edge of the second and the anterior edge of the third. The hindwings are rather dark grey.
