= Aristotelia centrosema =

Scientific classification
- Kingdom: Animalia
- Phylum: Arthropoda
- Clade: Pancrustacea
- Class: Insecta
- Order: Lepidoptera
- Family: Gelechiidae
- Genus: Aristotelia
- Species: A. centrosema

Binomial name
- Aristotelia centrosema (Lower, 1893)

Synonyms
- Gelechia centrosema Lower, 1893

Species of moth

Aristotelia centrosema is a moth of the family Gelechiidae. It was described by Oswald Bertram Lower in 1893. It is found in Australia, where it has been recorded from Tasmania, New South Wales and Victoria.

The wingspan is 10–14 mm (0.39–0.55 in). The forewings are ochreous bronzy, sometimes golden tinged, the costal half usually more or less pale, the dorsal half more or less suffused with fuscous. The costal edge is ochreous whitish from about one-fourth to three-fourths and there is a rather narrow ochreous-white median longitudinal streak from the base to the apex. The hindwings are grey.
