= Aristotelia adenostomae =

Scientific classification
- Kingdom: Animalia
- Phylum: Arthropoda
- Clade: Pancrustacea
- Class: Insecta
- Order: Lepidoptera
- Family: Gelechiidae
- Genus: Aristotelia
- Species: A. adenostomae

Binomial name
- Aristotelia adenostomae Keifer, 1933

Species of moth

Aristotelia adenostomae is a moth of the family Gelechiidae. It was described by Keifer in 1933. It is found in North America, where it has been recorded from California.

The length of the forewings is 4.3–6 mm.

The larvae feed on Adenostoma fasciculatum.
