= Aristotelia sinistra =

Scientific classification
- Kingdom: Animalia
- Phylum: Arthropoda
- Clade: Pancrustacea
- Class: Insecta
- Order: Lepidoptera
- Family: Gelechiidae
- Genus: Aristotelia
- Species: A. sinistra

Binomial name
- Aristotelia sinistra Meyrick, 1904

Species of moth

Aristotelia sinistra is a moth of the family Gelechiidae. It was described by Edward Meyrick in 1904. It is found in Australia, where it has been recorded from New South Wales.

The wingspan is 10–12 mm (0.39–0.47 in). The forewings are ashy fuscous, purplish tinged, sometimes irrorated (sprinkled) with dark fuscous and with the markings blackish mixed with deep golden bronzy. There is an obsolete dorsal spot near the base and a subcostal spot at one-sixth, and one on the fold slightly beyond it. An outwardly oblique bar is found from beneath the costa at one-third to the fold and a spot in the middle of the disc, and one at two-thirds (representing the stigmata). There are also indistinct opposite costal and tornal whitish spots at two-thirds. The hindwings are grey.
