= Aristotelia rhoisella =

Scientific classification
- Kingdom: Animalia
- Phylum: Arthropoda
- Clade: Pancrustacea
- Class: Insecta
- Order: Lepidoptera
- Family: Gelechiidae
- Genus: Aristotelia
- Species: A. rhoisella

Binomial name
- Aristotelia rhoisella Busck, 1934

Species of moth

Aristotelia rhoisella is a moth of the family Gelechiidae. It was described by August Busck in 1934. It is found in North America, where it has been recorded from California.
