= Aristotelia crassicornis =

Scientific classification
- Kingdom: Animalia
- Phylum: Arthropoda
- Clade: Pancrustacea
- Class: Insecta
- Order: Lepidoptera
- Family: Gelechiidae
- Genus: Aristotelia
- Species: A. crassicornis

Binomial name
- Aristotelia crassicornis Walsingham, 1897

Species of moth

Aristotelia crassicornis is a moth of the family Gelechiidae. It was described by Thomas de Grey, 6th Baron Walsingham, in 1897. It is found on the Virgin Islands, where it has been recorded from St. Jan.

The wingspan is about 8 mm. The forewings are hoary whitish, sprinkled with greyish-fuscous scaling and with numerous short, slender, dark fuscous longitudinal streaklets accompanied by a few ferruginous scales, these have a tendency to follow the lines of the cell and of the fold, being only indicated on the costa by a minute streak at the base and two spots, one before the other behind the middle. The hindwings are shining, pale grey.
