= Aristotelia calculatrix =

Scientific classification
- Kingdom: Animalia
- Phylum: Arthropoda
- Clade: Pancrustacea
- Class: Insecta
- Order: Lepidoptera
- Family: Gelechiidae
- Genus: Aristotelia
- Species: A. calculatrix

Binomial name
- Aristotelia calculatrix Meyrick, 1923

Species of moth

Aristotelia calculatrix is a moth of the family Gelechiidae. It was described by Edward Meyrick in 1923. It is found in the Brazilian states of Pará and Amazonas.

The wingspan is 7–9 mm. The forewings are light greyish ochreous irregularly irrorated (sprinkled) with dark fuscous and with an oblique dark fuscous fascia from the costa at one-third not reaching the dorsum, the lower portion forming an angular prominence posteriorly. There is an oblique fascia from the costa at two-thirds reaching two-thirds across the wing, the upper part dark fuscous, the lower ochreous brown. There is also an inwardly oblique dark fuscous spot on the costa before the apex, edged whitish anteriorly, more or less connected beneath by a dark fuscous dash in the disc with the preceding. The hindwings are rather dark grey.
