= Aristotelia mesoxysta =

Scientific classification
- Kingdom: Animalia
- Phylum: Arthropoda
- Clade: Pancrustacea
- Class: Insecta
- Order: Lepidoptera
- Family: Gelechiidae
- Genus: Aristotelia
- Species: A. mesoxysta

Binomial name
- Aristotelia mesoxysta Meyrick, 1913

Species of moth

Aristotelia mesoxysta is a moth of the family Gelechiidae. It was described by Edward Meyrick in 1913. It is found in Tunisia.
