= Aristotelia dryonota =

Scientific classification
- Kingdom: Animalia
- Phylum: Arthropoda
- Clade: Pancrustacea
- Class: Insecta
- Order: Lepidoptera
- Family: Gelechiidae
- Genus: Aristotelia
- Species: A. dryonota

Binomial name
- Aristotelia dryonota Meyrick, 1926

Species of moth

Aristotelia dryonota is a moth of the family Gelechiidae. It was described by Edward Meyrick in 1926. It is found in South Africa, where it has been recorded from the Western Cape.

The wingspan is about 14 mm. The forewings are grey irrorated (sprinkled) with blackish, irregularly mixed blue leaden and with an irregular brownish-ochreous dorsal stripe from the base to the apex, occupying about one-third of the wing, posteriorly somewhat interrupted. The discal stigmata are rather large, black, and edged laterally with a few white scales, the first preceded by a slender, indistinct ochreous dash. The plical is less marked, resting on the edge of the dorsal stripe very obliquely before the first discal. The hindwings are slaty grey.
