= Aristotelia eumeris =

Scientific classification
- Kingdom: Animalia
- Phylum: Arthropoda
- Clade: Pancrustacea
- Class: Insecta
- Order: Lepidoptera
- Family: Gelechiidae
- Genus: Aristotelia
- Species: A. eumeris

Binomial name
- Aristotelia eumeris Meyrick, 1923

Species of moth

Aristotelia eumeris is a moth of the family Gelechiidae. It was described by Edward Meyrick in 1923. It is found in North America, where it has been recorded from California and Arizona.

The wingspan is about 12 mm. The forewings are rather light brown, near the dorsum faintly rosy tinged. There is an oblique white fascia at one-fourth, slightly sprinkled with grey, anteriorly edged with blackish. There is also a moderate white grey-sprinkled median fascia, with the outer edge convex, and with a black dot in the middle, the inner acutely indented in the middle, the space between this and the preceding fascia blackish from the costa to the fold. Beyond this is a blackish costal blotch extending to a white spot at three-fourths, grey sprinkled beneath and imperfectly separated by an elongate blackish spot in the disc from a cloudy whitish erect spot on the tornus. There is some dark grey costal suffusion between this and the apex. The hindwings are grey.
