= Aristotelia pulicella =

Scientific classification
- Kingdom: Animalia
- Phylum: Arthropoda
- Clade: Pancrustacea
- Class: Insecta
- Order: Lepidoptera
- Family: Gelechiidae
- Genus: Aristotelia
- Species: A. pulicella

Binomial name
- Aristotelia pulicella Walsingham, 1897

Synonyms
- Recurvaria hippurista Meyrick, 1932

Species of moth

Aristotelia pulicella is a moth of the family Gelechiidae. It was described by Thomas de Grey, 6th Baron Walsingham, in 1897. It is found in West Indies, where it has been recorded from St. Thomas.

The wingspan is about 7 mm. The forewings are whitish grey, shaded with greyish fuscous, especially along the costal third. This is interrupted on the costa by a pale median space and some pale speckling before the apex. Some minute blackish dots are scattered along the line of the fold, with one on the disc before the middle and a few black scales beneath the apex at the base of the yellowish-grey cilia. The hindwings are brownish grey.
