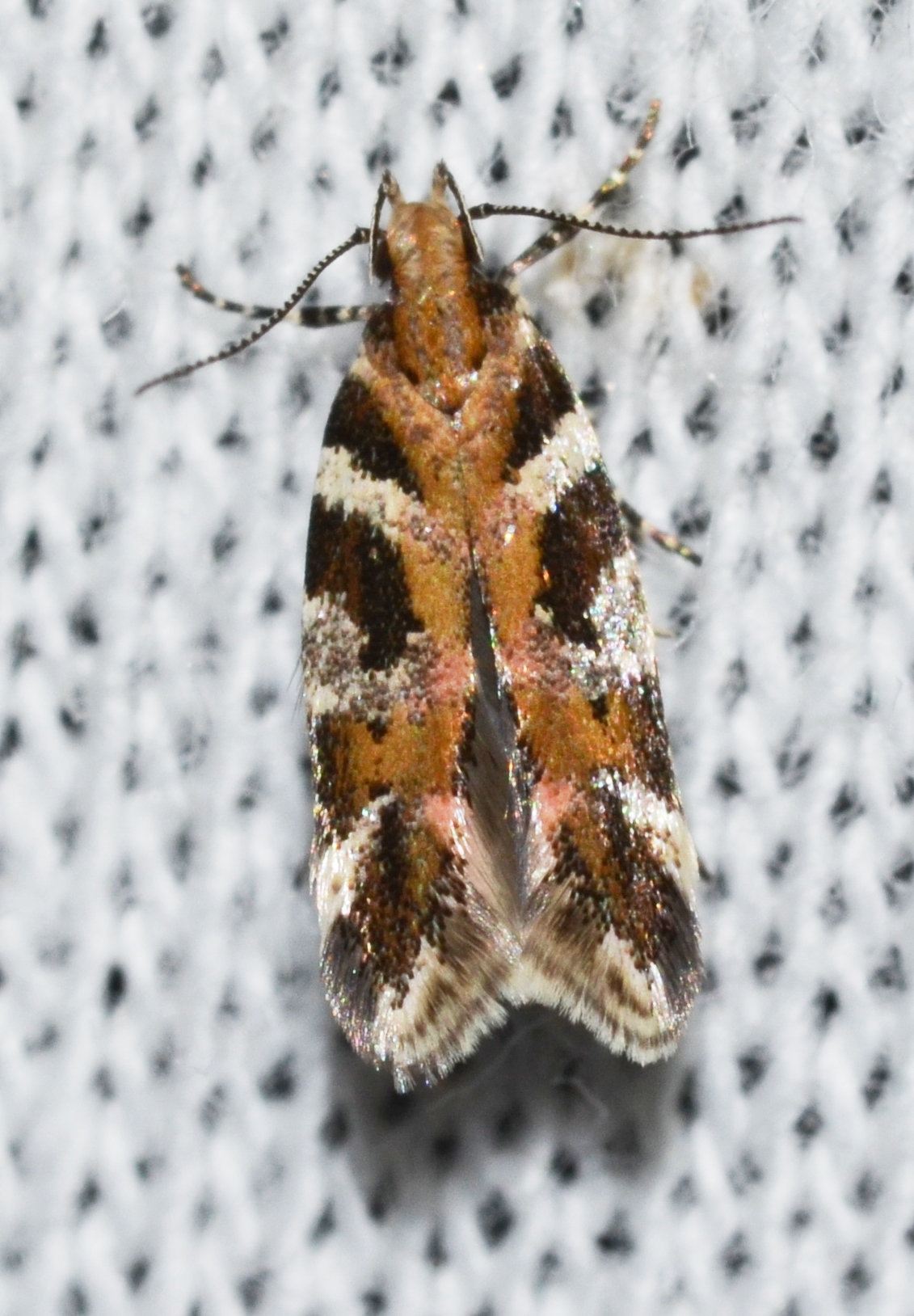
- Aristotelia roseosuffusella

Scientific classification
- Kingdom: Animalia
- Phylum: Arthropoda
- Clade: Pancrustacea
- Class: Insecta
- Order: Lepidoptera
- Family: Gelechiidae
- Subfamily: Anomologinae
- Genus: Aristotelia; Hübner, 1825

Synonyms
- Ergatis Heinemann, 1870 (junior homonym of Ergatis Blackwall, 1841 - Replacement name : Aristotelia); Eucatoptus Walsingham, 1897; Tsochasta Meyrick, 1885; Isochasta Meyrick, 1886

= Aristotelia (moth) =

Genus of moths

Aristotelia is a genus of moths in the family Gelechiidae. Well-known species are food plant specialists, and diverse hosts are used – Salicaceae, Solanaceae, Rosaceae, Fagaceae, Fabaceae, Asteraceae.

== Species ==
- Aristotelia achyrobathra Meyrick, 1933
- Aristotelia adceanotha Keifer, 1935
- Aristotelia adenostomae Keifer, 1933
- Aristotelia amelanchierella Braun, 1925
- Aristotelia antipala Meyrick, 1904
- Aristotelia aphiltra Meyrick, 1917
- Aristotelia aphthoropa Turner, 1939
- Aristotelia aphromorpha Meyrick, 1923
- Aristotelia aquosa Meyrick, 1925
- Aristotelia argentifera Busck, 1903
- Aristotelia argodecta Meyrick, 1918
- Aristotelia argyractis Meyrick, 1923
- Aristotelia articulata Meyrick, 1918
- Aristotelia avanica Piskunov & Emelyanov, 1982
- Aristotelia balanocentra Meyrick, 1914
- Aristotelia baltica A. Sulcs & I. Sulcs, 1983
- Aristotelia benedenii (Weyenbergh, 1873)
- Aristotelia bicomis Bippus, 2020
- Aristotelia bifasciella Busck, 1903
- Aristotelia billii Varenne & J. Nel, 2013
- Aristotelia brizella (Treitschke, 1833)
- Aristotelia brochodesma Meyrick, 1908
- Aristotelia calastomella (Christoph, 1873)
- Aristotelia calculatrix Meyrick, 1923
- Aristotelia calens Meyrick, 1923
- Aristotelia callirrhoda Meyrick, 1923
- Aristotelia callyntrophora Rebel, 1899
- Aristotelia centrosema (Lower, 1893)
- Aristotelia citrocosma Meyrick, 1908
- Aristotelia chalybeiochroa (Walsingham, 1897)
- Aristotelia chlorographa Meyrick, 1914
- Aristotelia clavata Meyrick, 1914
- Aristotelia coeruleopictella (Caradja, 1920)
- Aristotelia comis Meyrick, 1913
- Aristotelia condensata Meyrick, 1928
- Aristotelia corallina Walsingham, 1909
- Aristotelia cosmographa Meyrick, 1917
- Aristotelia crassicornis Walsingham, 1897
- Aristotelia crypsixantha Turner, 1919
- Aristotelia cynthia Meyrick, 1917
- Aristotelia cytheraea Meyrick, 1917
- Aristotelia dasypoda Walsingham, 1910
- Aristotelia decoratella (Staudinger, 1879)
- Aristotelia decurtella (Hubner, 1813)
- Aristotelia devexella Braun, 1925
- Aristotelia diolcella Forbes, 1931
- Aristotelia dryonota Meyrick, 1926
- Aristotelia elachistella (Zeller, 1877)
- Aristotelia eldorada Keifer, 1936
- Aristotelia elegantella (Chambers, 1874)
- Aristotelia epacria Bradley, 1965
- Aristotelia epimetalla Meyrick, 1904
- Aristotelia epicharta Turner, 1919
- Aristotelia ericinella (Zeller, 1839)
- Aristotelia erycina Meyrick, 1917
- Aristotelia eupatoriella Busck, [1934]
- Aristotelia eumeris Meyrick, 1923
- Aristotelia euprepella Zerny, 1934
- Aristotelia eurypsola Turner, 1919
- Aristotelia flavicapitella (Chrétien, 1915)
- Aristotelia frankeniae Walsingham, 1898
- Aristotelia fungivorella (Clemens, 1865)
- Aristotelia furtiva Meyrick, 1904
- Aristotelia galeotis Meyrick, 1908
- Aristotelia heliacella (Herrich-Schaffer, 1854)
- Aristotelia hemisarca Lower, 1916
- Aristotelia hexacopa Meyrick, 1929
- Aristotelia hieroglyphica Walsingham, 1909
- Aristotelia howardi Walsingham, 1909
- Aristotelia iomarmara Meyrick, 1921
- Aristotelia iospora Meyrick, 1929
- Aristotelia isopelta Meyrick, 1929
- Aristotelia ivae Busck, 1900
- Aristotelia leonhardi Krone, 1907
- Aristotelia lespedezae Braun, 1930
- Aristotelia leucophanta Meyrick, 1908
- Aristotelia lignicolora Forbes, 1931
- Aristotelia lindanella Barnes & Busck, 1920
- Aristotelia macrothecta Meyrick, 1904
- Aristotelia melanaphra Meyrick, 1923
- Aristotelia mesoxysta Meyrick, 1913
- Aristotelia mirabilis (Christoph, 1888)
- Aristotelia mirandella (Chretien, 1908)
- Aristotelia modulatrix Meyrick, 1938
- Aristotelia molestella (Zeller, 1873)
- Aristotelia monilella Barnes & Busck, 1920
- Aristotelia montarcella A. Schmidt, 1941
- Aristotelia naxia Meyrick, 1926
- Aristotelia nesiotatos Park, 2014
- Aristotelia ochreella (Rebel, 1927)
- Aristotelia ochrostephana Turner, 1933
- Aristotelia ochroxysta Meyrick, 1929
- Aristotelia oribatis Meyrick, 1917
- Aristotelia ouedella (Chrétien, 1908)
- Aristotelia pachnopis Meyrick, 1939
- Aristotelia palamota Meyrick, 1926
- Aristotelia pamphaea Meyrick, 1904
- Aristotelia pancaliella (Staudinger, 1871)
- Aristotelia pantalaena (Walsingham, 1911)
- Aristotelia paphia Meyrick, 1917
- Aristotelia paradesma (Meyrick, 1885)
- Aristotelia parephoria Clarke, 1951
- Aristotelia paterata Meyrick, 1914
- Aristotelia penicillata (Walsingham, 1897)
- Aristotelia perfossa Meyrick, 1917
- Aristotelia perplexa Clarke, 1951
- Aristotelia planitia Braun, 1925
- Aristotelia primipilana Meyrick, 1923
- Aristotelia probolopis Meyrick, 1923
- Aristotelia psoraleae Braun, 1930
- Aristotelia ptilastis Meyrick, 1909
- Aristotelia pudibundella (Zeller, 1873)
- Aristotelia pulicella Walsingham, 1897
- Aristotelia pulvera Braun, 1923
- Aristotelia pyrodercia Walsingham, 1910
- Aristotelia resinosa Meyrick, 1918
- Aristotelia rhamnina Keifer, 1933
- Aristotelia rhoisella Busck, 1934
- Aristotelia roseosuffusella (Clemens, 1860)
- Aristotelia rubidella (Clemens, 1860)
- Aristotelia rufinotella (Chrétien, 1922)
- Aristotelia salicifungiella (Clemens, 1865)
- Aristotelia sarcodes Walsingham, 1910
- Aristotelia saturnina Meyrick, 1917
- Aristotelia schematias Meyrick, 1911
- Aristotelia schistopa Diakonoff, 1954
- Aristotelia sinistra Meyrick, 1904
- Aristotelia sphenomorpha Meyrick, 1930
- Aristotelia squamigera Walsingham, 1909
- Aristotelia staticella Milliere, 1876
- Aristotelia sticheris Turner, 1919
- Aristotelia subdecurtella (Stainton, 1859)
- Aristotelia subericinella (Duponchel, 1843)
- Aristotelia subrosea Meyrick, 1914
- Aristotelia swierstrae Janse, 1950
- Aristotelia tetracosma Meyrick, 1904
- Aristotelia thalamitis Meyrick, 1908
- Aristotelia themerastis Turner, 1919
- Aristotelia thetica Meyrick, 1904
- Aristotelia transfilata Meyrick, 1927
- Aristotelia trematias Meyrick, 1913
- Aristotelia triclasma Diakonoff, 1954
- Aristotelia trossulella Walsingham, 1897
- Aristotelia turbida Turner, 1919
- Aristotelia tyttha Falkovitsh & Bidzilya, 2003
- Aristotelia urbaurea Keifer, 1933
- Aristotelia vagabundella Forbes, 1931
- Aristotelia veteranella (Zeller, 1877)
- Aristotelia vicana Meyrick, 1917
- Aristotelia zetetica Meyrick, 1934

== Status unclear ==
- Aristotelia chrysometra Meyrick, 1926
- Aristotelia impunctella (Caradja, 1920), described as Xystophora impunctella (nom. nud.)
- Aristotelia incitata Meyrick, 1918
- Aristotelia notatella Dyar, 1904 (nom. nud.)

== Former species ==
- Aristotelia brizelloides Amsel, 1935
- Aristotelia interstratella (Christoph, 1872)
- Aristotelia leptocrossa Meyrick, 1926
- Aristotelia sardicolella (Schawerda, 1936)
