= Aristotelia pyrodercia =

Scientific classification
- Kingdom: Animalia
- Phylum: Arthropoda
- Clade: Pancrustacea
- Class: Insecta
- Order: Lepidoptera
- Family: Gelechiidae
- Genus: Aristotelia
- Species: A. pyrodercia

Binomial name
- Aristotelia pyrodercia Walsingham, 1910

Species of moth

Aristotelia pyrodercia is a moth of the family Gelechiidae. It was described by Thomas de Grey, 6th Baron Walsingham, in 1910. It is found in Mexico (Guerrero).

== Physical Characteristics ==
The wingspan of aristotelia pyrodercia is about 12 mm. The forewings are yellowish brown, crossed by oblique whitish streaks mixed with shining steel-like metallic scales, some minute blackish scales intermixed along their margins. A slender steely line, commencing at the base of the costa, crosses the fold obliquely outward to the dorsum, beyond it is a broader whitish costal streak, also crossing the fold obliquely outward, but scarcely reaching the dorsum. A third steely streak, from the costa before the middle, tending obliquely outward, is enlarged at the lower end of the cell and reverts to the middle of the dorsum, it is preceded by a pale plical spot margined on its inner side by black scales. Beyond this, about the middle of the costa, an oblique whitish streak tends outward to the end of the cell where it meets a more conspicuous white streak inverted from the costal cilia, both mixed with pale steel and blackish scales. Beyond the last white costal streak the costal cilia are greyish fuscous, with two inverted whitish streaklets at their base, a third shining white streak following the termen at the base of the whitish cilia through which run two dark shade-lines terminating before the tornus where a yellowish white line in the tornal cilia interrupts them. Near the base of this is a luminous steely spot, with some minute black scales along the margin. The hindwings and cilia are tawny greyish.
