= Aristotelia oribatis =

Scientific classification
- Kingdom: Animalia
- Phylum: Arthropoda
- Clade: Pancrustacea
- Class: Insecta
- Order: Lepidoptera
- Family: Gelechiidae
- Genus: Aristotelia
- Species: A. oribatis

Binomial name
- Aristotelia oribatis Meyrick, 1917

Species of moth

Aristotelia oribatis is a moth of the family Gelechiidae. It was described by Edward Meyrick in 1917. It is found in Peru.

The wingspan is about 14 mm. The forewings are blackish fuscous with a suffused brownish-ochreous streak along the dorsum from the base to the apex, occupying about one-third of the wing, partially confluent with a brownish-ochreous longitudinal streak above it from before the middle to three-fourths, which is partially edged with white above. There is an oblique white bar from the costa at one-fifth, almost reaching the dorsal streak, and a similar inwardly oblique white bar from the costa at four-fifths. There is also a white apical dot. The hindwings are light violet grey.
