= Aristotelia cytheraea =

Scientific classification
- Kingdom: Animalia
- Phylum: Arthropoda
- Clade: Pancrustacea
- Class: Insecta
- Order: Lepidoptera
- Family: Gelechiidae
- Genus: Aristotelia
- Species: A. cytheraea

Binomial name
- Aristotelia cytheraea Meyrick, 1917

Species of moth

Aristotelia cytheraea is a moth of the family Gelechiidae. It was described by Edward Meyrick in 1917. It is found in Colombia.

The wingspan is 8–10 mm. The forewings are pale greyish ochreous suffusedly irrorated (sprinkled) with dark fuscous, more or less tinged with rosy crimson, especially posteriorly. The stigmata are strong, blackish, somewhat elongate, more or less accompanied with spots of yellow-ochreous suffusion beneath and the second discal also above, the plical obliquely before the first discal, an oblique suffused dark fuscous streak from the costa to the plical. There are two small pale spots on the costa at five-sixths. The hindwings are grey, in males with expansible fringe of long grey-whitish hairs from the costa near the base.
