= Aristotelia bifasciella =

Scientific classification
- Kingdom: Animalia
- Phylum: Arthropoda
- Clade: Pancrustacea
- Class: Insecta
- Order: Lepidoptera
- Family: Gelechiidae
- Genus: Aristotelia
- Species: A. bifasciella

Binomial name
- Aristotelia bifasciella Busck, 1903

Species of moth

Aristotelia bifasciella is a moth of the family Gelechiidae. It was described by August Busck in 1903. It is found in North America, where it has been recorded from California, Arizona and Utah.

The wingspan is 14–16 mm. The forewings are dirty yellowish white, with two conspicuous dark brown fascite. The first oblique from the basal third of the costa to the middle of the dorsal edge, while the other is broader and nearly perpendicular on the costal edge at the apical third. Both are shaded with lighter yellowish brown toward the dorsal edge. Just before apex is a dark brown costal spot, continued in a very light yellowish area across the wing. The extreme base of the costa is blackish brown. The hindwings are light fuscous.
