= Aristotelia thetica =

Scientific classification
- Kingdom: Animalia
- Phylum: Arthropoda
- Clade: Pancrustacea
- Class: Insecta
- Order: Lepidoptera
- Family: Gelechiidae
- Genus: Aristotelia
- Species: A. thetica

Binomial name
- Aristotelia thetica Meyrick, 1904

Species of moth

Aristotelia thetica is a moth belonging to the family Gelechiidae. It was described by Edward Meyrick in 1904. It is found in Australia, where it has been recorded from New South Wales and Tasmania.

The wingspan is 11–13 mm (0.43–0.51 in). The forewings are light bronzy fuscous sprinkled with dark fuscous, sometimes with some whitish scales and with a dark fuscous spot on the fold at one-fourth, and one beneath the costa at one-third. The stigmata are moderate, dark fuscous, sometimes more or less surrounded with whitish, the plical very obliquely before the first discal, which is in the middle. The hindwings are pale grey.
