= Aristotelia planitia =

Scientific classification
- Kingdom: Animalia
- Phylum: Arthropoda
- Clade: Pancrustacea
- Class: Insecta
- Order: Lepidoptera
- Family: Gelechiidae
- Genus: Aristotelia
- Species: A. planitia

Binomial name
- Aristotelia planitia Braun, 1925

Species of moth

Aristotelia planitia is a moth of the family Gelechiidae. It was described by Annette Frances Braun in 1925. It is found in North America, where it has been recorded from Utah.

The wingspan is 13.5–14 mm.

The larvae probably feed on Salix species.
