= Aristotelia callyntrophora =

Scientific classification
- Kingdom: Animalia
- Phylum: Arthropoda
- Clade: Pancrustacea
- Class: Insecta
- Order: Lepidoptera
- Family: Gelechiidae
- Genus: Aristotelia
- Species: A. callyntrophora

Binomial name
- Aristotelia callyntrophora Rebel, 1899

Species of moth

Aristotelia callyntrophora is a moth of the family Gelechiidae. It was described by Hans Rebel in 1899. It is found in Yemen.

The wingspan is about 10 mm. The inner margin of the hindwings is densely covered with black scales.
