= Aristotelia elachistella =

Scientific classification
- Kingdom: Animalia
- Phylum: Arthropoda
- Clade: Pancrustacea
- Class: Insecta
- Order: Lepidoptera
- Family: Gelechiidae
- Genus: Aristotelia
- Species: A. elachistella

Binomial name
- Aristotelia elachistella (Zeller, 1877)

Synonyms
- Gelechia (Procheuusa) elachistella Zeller, 1877

Species of moth

Aristotelia elachistella is a moth of the family Gelechiidae. It was described by Philipp Christoph Zeller in 1877. It is found in Colombia.
