= Aristotelia paphia =

Scientific classification
- Kingdom: Animalia
- Phylum: Arthropoda
- Clade: Pancrustacea
- Class: Insecta
- Order: Lepidoptera
- Family: Gelechiidae
- Genus: Aristotelia
- Species: A. paphia

Binomial name
- Aristotelia paphia Meyrick, 1917

Species of moth

Aristotelia paphia is a moth of the family Gelechiidae. It was described by Edward Meyrick in 1917. It is found in Peru.

The wingspan is 10–12 mm. The forewings are rather dark grey, the dorsal area more or less mixed suffusedly with light crimson pink and sometimes with light ochreous. There are blackish oblique bars from the costa at one-sixth and one-third, just crossing the fold, the first posteriorly and the second on both sides more or less distinctly edged with whitish tinged with crimson pink. There is a rosy-white mark on the middle of the costa. The discal stigmata are black, the first sometimes connected with the apex of the preceding bar, the second larger, edged beneath by a light yellow-ochreous spot. A pale rose-pink spot is found on the costa at four-fifths, white on the costal edge. The hindwings are grey.
