= Aristotelia sphenomorpha =

Scientific classification
- Kingdom: Animalia
- Phylum: Arthropoda
- Clade: Pancrustacea
- Class: Insecta
- Order: Lepidoptera
- Family: Gelechiidae
- Genus: Aristotelia
- Species: A. sphenomorpha

Binomial name
- Aristotelia sphenomorpha Meyrick, 1930

Species of moth

Aristotelia sphenomorpha is a moth of the family Gelechiidae. It was described by Edward Meyrick in 1930. It is found in northern Vietnam.
