= Aristotelia turbida =

Scientific classification
- Kingdom: Animalia
- Phylum: Arthropoda
- Clade: Pancrustacea
- Class: Insecta
- Order: Lepidoptera
- Family: Gelechiidae
- Genus: Aristotelia
- Species: A. turbida

Binomial name
- Aristotelia turbida Turner, 1919

Species of moth

Aristotelia turbida is a moth of the family Gelechiidae. It was described by Alfred Jefferis Turner in 1919. It is found in Australia, where it has been recorded from Queensland.

The wingspan is about 10 mm. The forewings are ochreous-whitish irrorated with dark-fuscous and with a dark-fuscous dot near the base above the fold and a discal dot at one-third confluent with another beneath it on the fold to form an irregular spot. There is a spot above the middle before half, and another beneath the middle beyond half. The hindwings are pale-grey.
