= Aristotelia probolopis =

Scientific classification
- Kingdom: Animalia
- Phylum: Arthropoda
- Clade: Pancrustacea
- Class: Insecta
- Order: Lepidoptera
- Family: Gelechiidae
- Genus: Aristotelia
- Species: A. probolopis

Binomial name
- Aristotelia probolopis Meyrick, 1923

Species of moth

Aristotelia probolopis is a moth of the family Gelechiidae. It was described by Edward Meyrick in 1923. It is found in Peru and Amazonas, Brazil.

The wingspan is 9–10 mm (0.35–0.39 in). The forewings are bronzy brown, sometimes partially suffused with pale ochreous towards the dorsum and with the markings variable in development, dark brown partially mixed with blackish on the margins and the dorsum, irregularly edged whitish, between them some blue-leaden mixture. There is a moderately broad basal fascia, with the edge oblique. There is a moderate less oblique antemedian fascia, its posterior edge forming a sharply defined irregular upwards-oblique pointed projection in the disc and there is also a flattened-triangular blotch extending on the costa from the middle to three-fourths, the apex blackish, narrowly separated by ochreous whitish from a fasciate blotch along the upper half of the termen. The hindwings are dark grey.
