= Aristotelia perplexa =

Scientific classification
- Kingdom: Animalia
- Phylum: Arthropoda
- Clade: Pancrustacea
- Class: Insecta
- Order: Lepidoptera
- Family: Gelechiidae
- Genus: Aristotelia
- Species: A. perplexa

Binomial name
- Aristotelia perplexa Clarke, 1951

Species of moth

Aristotelia perplexa is a moth of the family Gelechiidae. It was described by Clarke in 1951. It is found in Argentina.
