= Aristotelia schematias =

Scientific classification
- Kingdom: Animalia
- Phylum: Arthropoda
- Clade: Pancrustacea
- Class: Insecta
- Order: Lepidoptera
- Family: Gelechiidae
- Genus: Aristotelia
- Species: A. schematias

Binomial name
- Aristotelia schematias Meyrick, 1911

Species of moth

Aristotelia schematias is a moth of the family Gelechiidae. It was described by Edward Meyrick in 1911. It is found on Mahé and Silhouette in the Seychelles.

The wingspan is about 10 mm. The forewings are brown suffused with dark fuscous irroration (sprinkles) and with an oblique ochreous-white fascia towards the base, as well as an oblique whitish streak from the costa at one-third, running into a rather narrow somewhat curved whitish postmedian fascia, both these somewhat mixed with blue grey. The stigmata are indistinct, formed by blackish irroration, the discal approximated, the plical before the first discal, a curved white line running from the postmedian fascia around the upper edge of the first discal and then direct beyond the plical to the dorsum. There is a white spot on the costa at five-sixths, where a blue-grey line edged anteriorly with white and containing a blackish dot in the disc runs to the tornus. There are also three minute white dots on the termen extending into the cilia. The hindwings are light grey.
