= Aristotelia thalamitis =

Scientific classification
- Kingdom: Animalia
- Phylum: Arthropoda
- Clade: Pancrustacea
- Class: Insecta
- Order: Lepidoptera
- Family: Gelechiidae
- Genus: Aristotelia
- Species: A. thalamitis

Binomial name
- Aristotelia thalamitis Meyrick, 1908

Species of moth

Aristotelia thalamitis is a moth of the family Gelechiidae. It was described by Edward Meyrick in 1908. It is found in Assam, India.

The wingspan is 11–12 mm. The forewings are whitish ochreous densely irrorated (sprinkled) with fuscous and dark fuscous, sometimes mixed with white in the disc and with oblique blackish marks on the costa near the base and at one-fourth, and blackish marks on the fold obliquely beyond each of these, the second representing the plical stigma and edged posteriorly with ochreous-yellowish suffusion, which is sometimes extended along the fold. There are round black dots beneath the middle of the costa and in the disc at two-thirds, edged with ochreous-yellowish suffusion and there is also some ochreous-yellow suffusion towards the base of the dorsum, and towards the apex. The costa is posteriorly suffused with dark fuscous, and marked with three or four white specks. Several white specks are found along the termen. The hindwings are grey, thinly scaled in the disc anteriorly.
