= Aristotelia argyractis =

Scientific classification
- Kingdom: Animalia
- Phylum: Arthropoda
- Clade: Pancrustacea
- Class: Insecta
- Order: Lepidoptera
- Family: Gelechiidae
- Genus: Aristotelia
- Species: A. argyractis

Binomial name
- Aristotelia argyractis Meyrick, 1923

Species of moth

Aristotelia argyractis is a moth of the family Gelechiidae, which are commonly known as gelechiid or twirler moths. It was described by Edward Meyrick in 1923 and is found in Amazonas, Brazil.

The wingspan is 10–11 mm (0.39–0.43 in). The forewings are bronzy fuscous or bronzy grey with bluish-silvery metallic markings. There are oblique streaks from the costa (leading edge of the wing) at the base and one-fourth not quite reaching the dorsum (the wing's trailing edge). A short oblique streak is found from the costa at one-third, white on the costa. There is a straight transverse streak from a white dot on the costa just beyond the middle and short oblique opposite streaks from the costa at three-fourths and the tornus (the wing's posterior corner), between these and the preceding, are short dorsal and longer submedian longitudinal light ochreous streaks. There are also two whitish dots on the costa posteriorly, three silvery dots on the termen and one at the apex. The hindwings are grey.
