= Aristotelia naxia =

Scientific classification
- Kingdom: Animalia
- Phylum: Arthropoda
- Clade: Pancrustacea
- Class: Insecta
- Order: Lepidoptera
- Family: Gelechiidae
- Genus: Aristotelia
- Species: A. naxia

Binomial name
- Aristotelia naxia Meyrick, 1926

Species of moth

Aristotelia naxia is a moth of the family Gelechiidae. It was described by Edward Meyrick in 1926. It is found on the Galápagos Islands.

The length of the forewings is 4.3-5.5 mm. The forewings are grey with dark brown markings. Adults are on wing most of the year, except June and August.
