= Aristotelia brochodesma =

Scientific classification
- Kingdom: Animalia
- Phylum: Arthropoda
- Clade: Pancrustacea
- Class: Insecta
- Order: Lepidoptera
- Family: Gelechiidae
- Genus: Aristotelia
- Species: A. brochodesma

Binomial name
- Aristotelia brochodesma Meyrick, 1908

Species of moth

Aristotelia brochodesma is a moth of the family Gelechiidae. It was described by Edward Meyrick in 1908. It is found in Assam, India.

The wingspan is 8–9 mm. The forewings are brown with a slender angulated white fascia at one-fifth, preceded by spots of blackish suffusion on the costa and below the middle, and followed below the middle by an elongate blackish mark terminated by a whitish dot, but these dark markings are sometimes merged in a general dark fuscous suffusion. There is a slender or irregular oblique whitish median fascia, preceded by a blackish spot on the costa and a dot above the dorsum, and followed by a blackish mark beneath the costa terminated by a white dot. A slender white fascia is found from three-fourths of the costa to before the tornus, the central third somewhat enlarged and containing a linear oblique black mark. The hindwings are dark fuscous, thinly scaled in the disc.
