= Aristotelia ochreella =

Scientific classification
- Kingdom: Animalia
- Phylum: Arthropoda
- Clade: Pancrustacea
- Class: Insecta
- Order: Lepidoptera
- Family: Gelechiidae
- Genus: Aristotelia
- Species: A. ochreella

Binomial name
- Aristotelia ochreella (Rebel, 1927)

Synonyms
- Apodia ochreella Rebel, 1927

Species of moth

Aristotelia ochreella is a moth of the family Gelechiidae. It was described by Hans Rebel in 1927. It is found in Egypt.
