= Aristotelia pulvera =

Scientific classification
- Kingdom: Animalia
- Phylum: Arthropoda
- Clade: Pancrustacea
- Class: Insecta
- Order: Lepidoptera
- Family: Gelechiidae
- Genus: Aristotelia
- Species: A. pulvera

Binomial name
- Aristotelia pulvera Braun, 1923

Species of moth

Aristotelia pulvera is a moth of the family Gelechiidae. It was described by Annette Frances Braun in 1923. It is found in North America, where it has been recorded from California.

The wingspan is about 13.5 mm. The forewings are whitish ocherous, evenly dusted with fine brown spots, and rosy tinged along the fold and in the apical third of the wing. There is an oblique brown bar from the basal third of the costa nearly to the dorsum, which is broadest on the fold. A quadrate brown patch is found at the apical third of the costa, and beneath it on the middle of the wing is a nearly circular golden-brown and rosy tinged spot.
