= Aristotelia cosmographa =

Scientific classification
- Kingdom: Animalia
- Phylum: Arthropoda
- Clade: Pancrustacea
- Class: Insecta
- Order: Lepidoptera
- Family: Gelechiidae
- Genus: Aristotelia
- Species: A. cosmographa

Binomial name
- Aristotelia cosmographa Meyrick, 1917

Species of moth

Aristotelia cosmographa is a moth of the family Gelechiidae. It was described by Edward Meyrick in 1917. It is found in Peru.

The wingspan is 11–12 mm. The forewings are brownish ochreous or deep yellow ochreous, the costal edge suffused with dark fuscous and with an oblique interrupted silvery-white streak near the base. There are three white streaks from the costa terminated by silvery-metallic subdorsal spots, the first from one-fourth, oblique, edged anteriorly with blackish suffusion, the second from the middle, direct, the third from four-fifths, inwardly oblique, the second and third connected by a suffused blackish streak in the disc, a spot of silvery-white suffusion beneath the costa between the first and second connected with the costa by a white strigula. There is a white dot on the apex, and sometimes two or three on the termen. The hindwings are slaty grey.
