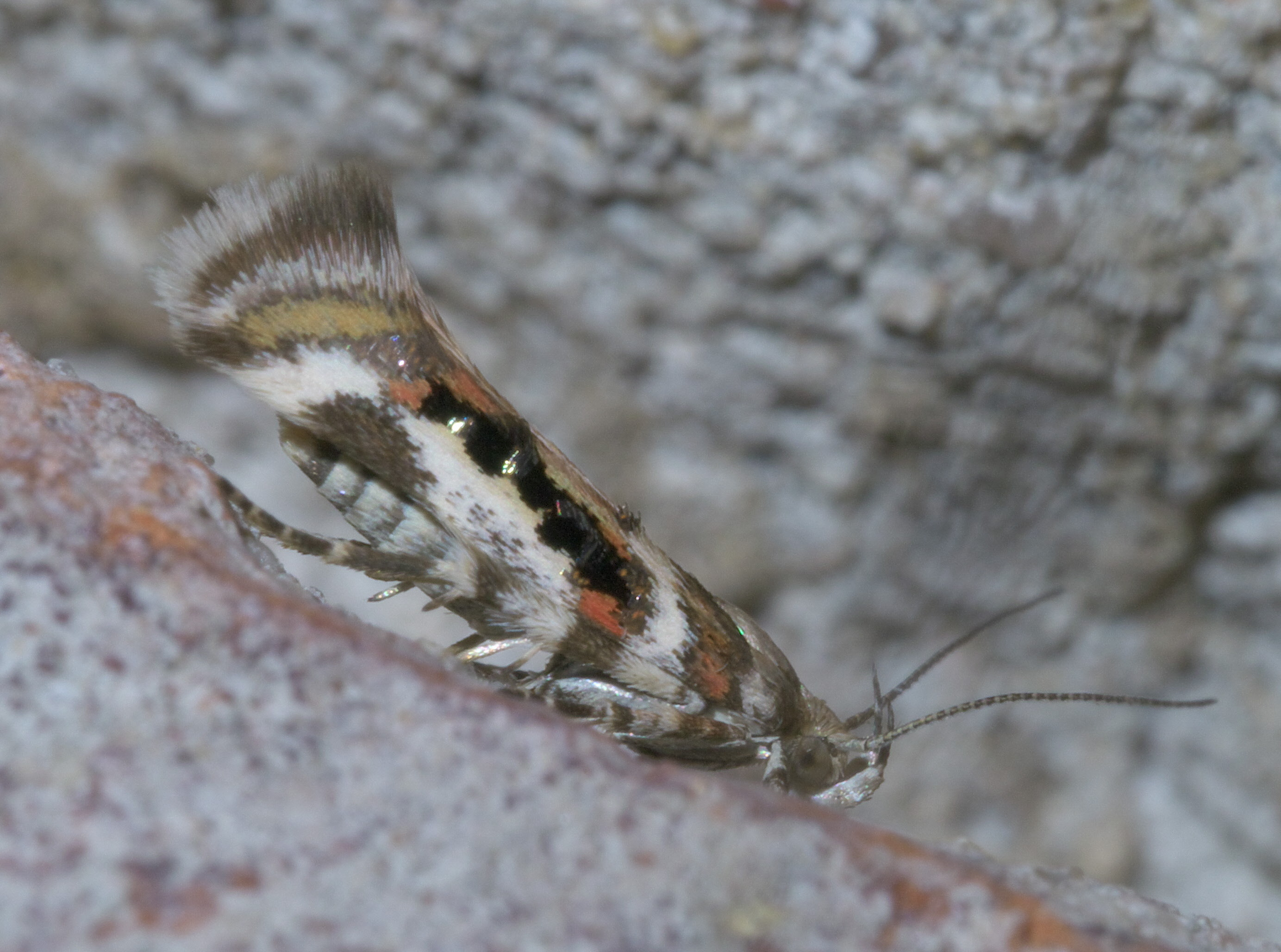

Scientific classification
- Kingdom: Animalia
- Phylum: Arthropoda
- Clade: Pancrustacea
- Class: Insecta
- Order: Lepidoptera
- Family: Gelechiidae
- Genus: Aristotelia
- Species: A. elegantella

Binomial name
- Aristotelia elegantella (Chambers, 1874)

Synonyms
- Gelechia elegantella Chambers, 1874; Aristotelia superbella Chambers, 1875 (nom. nud.)

= Aristotelia elegantella =

Species of moth

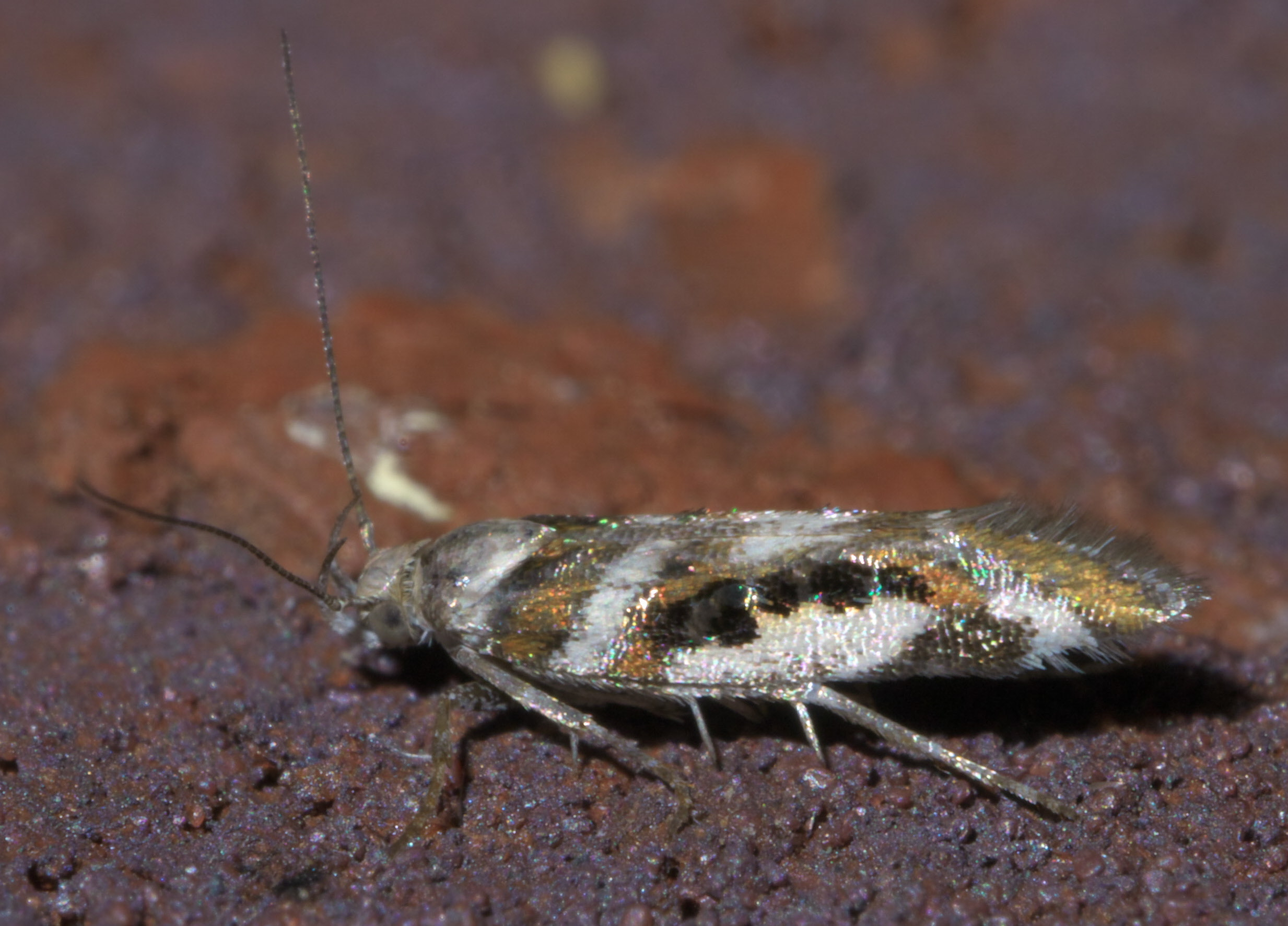
Aristotelia elegantella, elegant aristotelia moth, Size: 5.9 mm

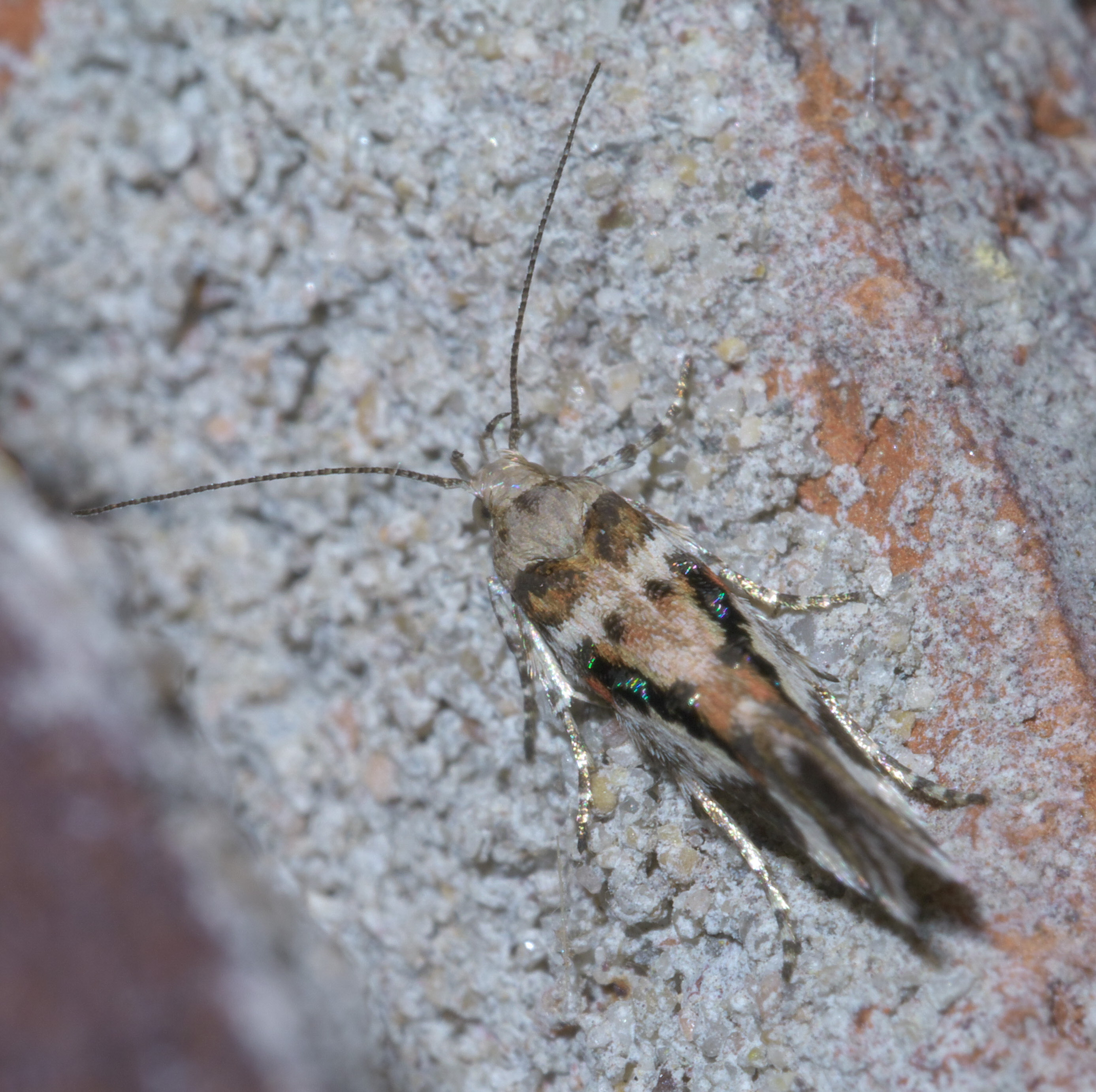
Aristotelia elegantella, elegant aristotelia moth

Aristotelia elegantella is a moth of the family Gelechiidae. It was described by Vactor Tousey Chambers in 1874. It is found in North America, where it has been recorded from Arizona, California, Colorado, Illinois, Indiana, Iowa, Kansas, Kentucky, Louisiana, Mississippi, New Mexico, Ohio, Oklahoma, Ontario, Texas and Utah.

The wingspan is about 13 mm. The base of the forewings is white, iridescent, narrow, but wider on the dorsal than on the costal margin. This is followed by an oblique, ochreous or yellowish-orange band, which crosses the wing and is margined with brown before and behind, and followed by an oblique white band, which also crosses the wing, and is rather widely margined behind by an iridescent, brown line, terminating at a smooth tuft of raised scales on the dorsal margin, the tuft or rather smooth elevation being metallic and highly iridescent, as also are the brown margins of the ochreous bands. The dark brown, posterior margin of the second brown fascia is produced backwards along the disc and passes backwards along the disc, inclining towards, but not reaching the base of the dorsal cilia, and containing three smooth, metallic elevations, like the one on the dorsal margin, the wing between it and the costa being white, and between it and the dorsal margin the wing is white and pale ochreous. The oblique streak terminates just before the dorsal cilia at a curved fascia, which is very convex towards the base, is reddish ochreous on the dorsal margin, and brown on the costal margin. This curved fascia is followed by an oblique one, which is nearest to the tip on the costal margin, and the costal portion of it is wide and white, and the dorsal portion brown, and in some lights is brilliant metallic. The brown portion is narrow where it meets the white costal portion, and passes around behind it to the costal margin, and thence curves as a narrow line backwards around the apex at the base of the cilia, returning to its origin on the dorsal margin, thus enclosing an oblong, egg-yellow or golden patch, parallel with the base of the dorsal cilia. In some lights this fascia is dull brown, not at all metallic, and the yellowish ochreous parts of the wing become almost brick red.
