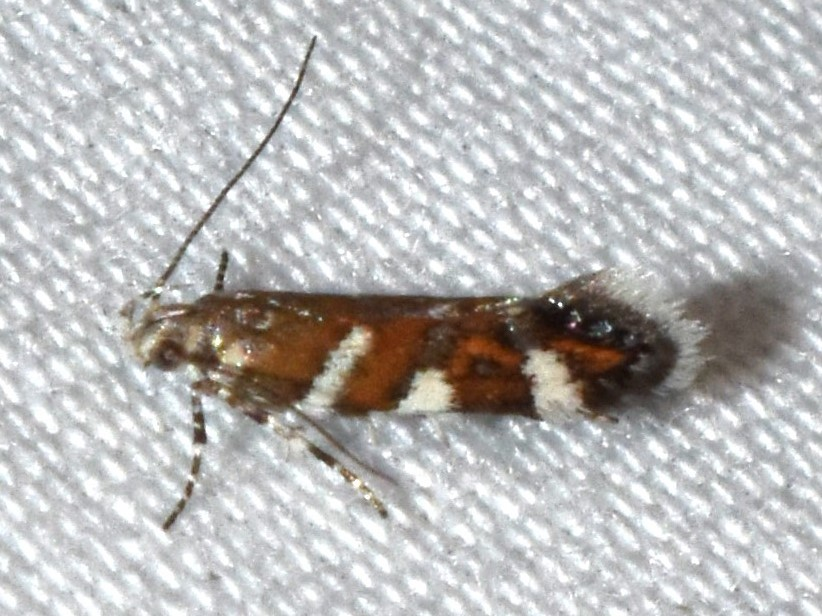

Scientific classification
- Kingdom: Animalia
- Phylum: Arthropoda
- Clade: Pancrustacea
- Class: Insecta
- Order: Lepidoptera
- Family: Gelechiidae
- Genus: Aristotelia
- Species: A. monilella

Binomial name
- Aristotelia monilella Barnes & Busck, 1920

= Aristotelia monilella =

Species of moth

Aristotelia monilella is a species of moth in the family Gelechiidae. It was first described by William Barnes and August Busck in 1920. It is found in North America, where it has been recorded from Illinois, Kentucky, North Carolina and Florida.

== Description ==
The wingspan is 12 to 13 millimetres (0.47 to 0.51 in). The forewings are light golden brown, at the basal fourth with an outwardly oblique white transverse streak, attenuated towards the dorsum and not quite reaching the dorsal edge. There is an equilateral triangular white spot on the middle of the costa and at apical fourth an inwardly directed triangular white spot. All of these white spots are marginal and continued across the wing by black and metallic-blue scales and terminate on the dorsal edge in small white spots. The apical and terminal edges are broadly velvety black with conspicuous tufts of metallic-blue scales around the margin.
