= Aristotelia transfilata =

Scientific classification
- Kingdom: Animalia
- Phylum: Arthropoda
- Clade: Pancrustacea
- Class: Insecta
- Order: Lepidoptera
- Family: Gelechiidae
- Genus: Aristotelia
- Species: A. transfilata

Binomial name
- Aristotelia transfilata Meyrick, 1927

Species of moth

Aristotelia transfilata is a moth of the family Gelechiidae. It was described by Edward Meyrick in 1927. It is found on Samoa.
