= Aristotelia avanica =

Scientific classification
- Kingdom: Animalia
- Phylum: Arthropoda
- Clade: Pancrustacea
- Class: Insecta
- Order: Lepidoptera
- Family: Gelechiidae
- Genus: Aristotelia
- Species: A. avanica

Binomial name
- Aristotelia avanica Piskunov & Emelyanov, 1982

Species of moth

Aristotelia avanica is a moth of the family Gelechiidae. It was described by Piskunov and Emelyanov in 1982. It is found in Armenia and Uzbekistan.

The larvae feed on Atraphaxis spinosa.
