= Aristotelia hieroglyphica =

Scientific classification
- Kingdom: Animalia
- Phylum: Arthropoda
- Clade: Pancrustacea
- Class: Insecta
- Order: Lepidoptera
- Family: Gelechiidae
- Genus: Aristotelia
- Species: A. hieroglyphica

Binomial name
- Aristotelia hieroglyphica Walsingham, 1909

Species of moth

Aristotelia hieroglyphica is a moth of the family Gelechiidae. It was described by Thomas de Grey, 6th Baron Walsingham, in 1909. It is found in Mexico (Tabasco).

The wingspan is about 11 mm. The forewings are dark fawn-brown, paler along the dorsal half, with a pale patch at the lower angle of the cell. A whitish cinereous fascia leaves the costa at about one-sixth, running obliquely outward to the fold, but not traceable below it, this fascia is somewhat widened, showing a tendency to reduplication by brown scales along its middle. Parallel with this is a short oblique costal streak before the middle, and beyond the middle is another, converging at its apex with a similar inverted costal streak from before the end of the wing, from the inner edge of the first a narrow line of the same colour crosses the fold inward, but does not reach the dorsum. Between these markings a slight suffusion of blackish scales extends from the base to the apex, and there are also some shining steel-grey scales about the ends of the second and third costal streaks, and in a small separate patch above the tornus. The hindwings are pale greyish fuscous, with a slight rosy tinge.
