= Aristotelia chlorographa =

Scientific classification
- Kingdom: Animalia
- Phylum: Arthropoda
- Clade: Pancrustacea
- Class: Insecta
- Order: Lepidoptera
- Family: Gelechiidae
- Genus: Aristotelia
- Species: A. chlorographa

Binomial name
- Aristotelia chlorographa Meyrick, 1914

Species of moth

Aristotelia chlorographa is a moth of the family Gelechiidae. It was described by Edward Meyrick in 1914. It is found in Mozambique and South Africa, where it has been recorded from Gauteng.

The wingspan is about 11 mm. The forewings are dark grey, with the bases of the scales whitish and with a narrow irregular blackish basal fascia. There is a whitish-yellowish streak formed of three confluent subtriangular spots extending along the dorsum from this to near the tornus, connected with a crescentic posteriorly convex whitish-yellowish mark in the disc at three-fifths, marked in concavity with a black dot. There are three black slenderly white-edged fasciae from the costa terminated by this streak, the first at one-sixth, slender, little oblique, the second at one-third, moderate, rather more oblique, mostly brown in the disc and with a discal projection posteriorly, these two cut by a fine light brown longitudinal streak above the middle, the third at three-fifths, broader on the costa, in the disc with an acute projection posteriorly, mostly occupied anteriorly by the yellowish discal mark. There is also a blackish spot on the apical portion of the costa, containing two minute white dots, and separated from the preceding by a grey-whitish spot. A brown streak is found along the termen, containing three or four minute white dots in a fine blackish marginal line. The hindwings are grey, somewhat darker posteriorly.
