= Aristotelia rufinotella =

Scientific classification
- Kingdom: Animalia
- Phylum: Arthropoda
- Clade: Pancrustacea
- Class: Insecta
- Order: Lepidoptera
- Family: Gelechiidae
- Genus: Aristotelia
- Species: A. rufinotella

Binomial name
- Aristotelia rufinotella (Chrétien, 1922)

Synonyms
- Xystophora rufinotella Chrétien, 1922

Species of moth

Aristotelia rufinotella is a moth of the family Gelechiidae. It was described by Pierre Chrétien in 1922. It is found in Morocco.
