= Aristotelia argodecta =

Scientific classification
- Kingdom: Animalia
- Phylum: Arthropoda
- Clade: Pancrustacea
- Class: Insecta
- Order: Lepidoptera
- Family: Gelechiidae
- Genus: Aristotelia
- Species: A. argodecta

Binomial name
- Aristotelia argodecta Meyrick, 1918

Species of moth

Aristotelia argodecta is a moth of the family Gelechiidae. It was described by Edward Meyrick in 1918. It is found in Sri Lanka.

The wingspan is about 7 mm. The forewings are brown with narrow transverse white spots from the dorsum at two-fifths and the tornus, and from the costa beyond these at two-fifths and four-fifths. The plical and first discal stigmata are represented by cloudy dark fuscous marks following the first dorsal and costal spots respectively, the second discal by a dark fuscous dot following the apex of the tornal spot and finely white edged posteriorly. There are several minute white marginal dots around the apex. The hindwings are rather dark fuscous.
