= Aristotelia chrysometra =

Scientific classification
- Kingdom: Animalia
- Phylum: Arthropoda
- Clade: Pancrustacea
- Class: Insecta
- Order: Lepidoptera
- Family: Gelechiidae
- Genus: Aristotelia
- Species: A. chrysometra

Binomial name
- Aristotelia chrysometra Meyrick, 1926

Species of moth

Aristotelia chrysometra is a moth of the family Gelechiidae. It was described by Edward Meyrick in 1926. It is found in Ecuador.

The wingspan is about 7 mm. The forewings are shining golden bronze with golden-white, black-edged markings. There is a slender oblique transverse fasciae at one-fourth and before the middle, as well as short oblique streaks from the costa beyond the middle and at three-fourths, as well as a short inwards-oblique streak from the costa before the apex. A triangular dot is found on the dorsum between the first and second of these streaks, and a smaller dot between the second and third. There is also a minute apical dot. The hindwings are dark fuscous.
