= Aristotelia hexacopa =

Scientific classification
- Kingdom: Animalia
- Phylum: Arthropoda
- Clade: Pancrustacea
- Class: Insecta
- Order: Lepidoptera
- Family: Gelechiidae
- Genus: Aristotelia
- Species: A. hexacopa

Binomial name
- Aristotelia hexacopa Meyrick, 1929

Species of moth

Aristotelia hexacopa is a moth of the family Gelechiidae. It was described by Edward Meyrick in 1929. It is found in North America, where it has been recorded from Arizona, California and New Mexico.
