= Aristotelia penicillata =

Scientific classification
- Kingdom: Animalia
- Phylum: Arthropoda
- Clade: Pancrustacea
- Class: Insecta
- Order: Lepidoptera
- Family: Gelechiidae
- Genus: Aristotelia
- Species: A. penicillata

Binomial name
- Aristotelia penicillata (Walsingham, 1897)

Synonyms
- Eucatoptus penicillata Walsingham, 1897

Species of moth

Aristotelia penicillata is a moth of the family Gelechiidae. It was described by Thomas de Grey, 6th Baron Walsingham, in 1897. It is found in West Indies, where it has been recorded from Haiti.

The wingspan is about 10 mm. The forewings are ochreous, mottled with greyish fuscous and metallic steel-grey, with creamy-white streaks and spots. An oblique greyish-fuscous patch, edged with blackish scales externally, extends from the base of the costa nearly to the dorsum and is immediately followed by a triangular whitish streak of equal length. Two small whitish spots on the costa beyond it are followed around the termen by short streak-spots through the terminal cilia and two small black dots lie on the cell, the first at one-half, the other at its end. The steel-grey mottling appears to accompany the paler markings, except in the case of one patch near the tornus. A rosy tinge appears beyond the edge of the cell and between the black dots upon it. The hindwings are pale grey.
