= Aristotelia iomarmara =

Scientific classification
- Kingdom: Animalia
- Phylum: Arthropoda
- Clade: Pancrustacea
- Class: Insecta
- Order: Lepidoptera
- Family: Gelechiidae
- Genus: Aristotelia
- Species: A. iomarmara

Binomial name
- Aristotelia iomarmara Meyrick, 1921

Species of moth

Aristotelia iomarmara is a moth of the family Gelechiidae. It was described by Edward Meyrick in 1921. It is found in Australia, where it has been recorded from Queensland.

The wingspan is about 8 mm. The forewings are light ochreous grey, irregularly sprinkled and strigulated with darker grey, with strong purple reflections. The second discal stigma is dark grey. The hindwings are light grey.
