= Aristotelia nesiotatos =

Scientific classification
- Kingdom: Animalia
- Phylum: Arthropoda
- Clade: Pancrustacea
- Class: Insecta
- Order: Lepidoptera
- Family: Gelechiidae
- Genus: Aristotelia
- Species: A. nesiotatos

Binomial name
- Aristotelia nesiotatos Park, 2014 in Bae et al., 2014

Species of moth

Aristotelia nesiotatos is a moth of the family Gelechiidae. It was described by Kyu-Tek Park in 2014. It is found in Korea, where it has been recorded from the island of Yeonpyeongdo.

The wingspan is about 8.5 mm (0.33 in) for the holotype, a male.

== Etymology ==
The species name is derived from the Greek nesos (meaning island) with the Greek superlative ending -tatos.
