= Aristotelia modulatrix =

Scientific classification
- Kingdom: Animalia
- Phylum: Arthropoda
- Clade: Pancrustacea
- Class: Insecta
- Order: Lepidoptera
- Family: Gelechiidae
- Genus: Aristotelia
- Species: A. modulatrix

Binomial name
- Aristotelia modulatrix Meyrick, 1938

Species of moth

Aristotelia modulatrix is a moth of the family Gelechiidae. It was described by Edward Meyrick in 1938. It is found in North Kivu of the Democratic Republic of the Congo.
