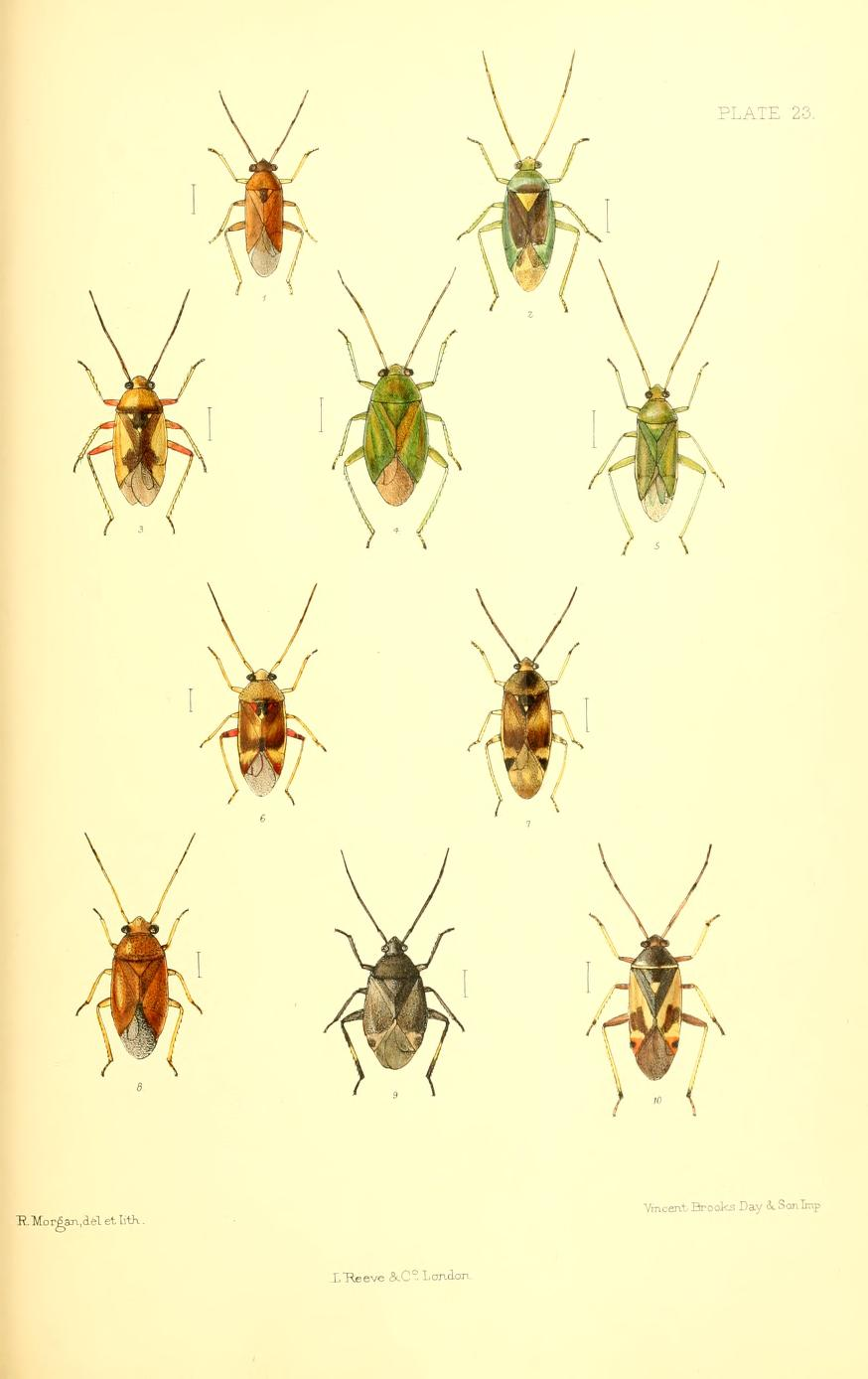
- Apolygus spinolae depicted in Edward Saunders Hemiptera Heteroptera of the British Islands (figure 4)

Scientific classification
- Kingdom: Animalia
- Phylum: Arthropoda
- Class: Insecta
- Order: Hemiptera
- Suborder: Heteroptera
- Family: Miridae
- Genus: Apolygus
- Species: A. spinolae

Binomial name
- Apolygus spinolae (Meyer-Dür, 1843)

= Apolygus spinolae =

Species of true bug

Apolygus spinolae is a species of true bug in the Miridae family. It can be found throughout Europe, except for Albania, Estonia, Liechtenstein, Malta, and Portugal. and not in the extreme south. Then east across the Palearctic to Siberia, and through Central Asia to China and Japan

== Description ==
Adults length is 5–6 millimetres (0.20–0.24 in). The species are coloured black on the bottom and green on top, with a brownish back.

== Ecology ==
They feed on plants of various kinds, including bog-myrtle (Myrica gale), bramble (Rubus), creeping thistle (Cirsium arvense), meadowsweet (Filipendula ulmaria), and nettle (Urtica). The species are active June–September.
