= Altica ericeti =

Scientific classification
- Domain: Eukaryota
- Kingdom: Animalia
- Phylum: Arthropoda
- Class: Insecta
- Order: Coleoptera
- Suborder: Polyphaga
- Infraorder: Cucujiformia
- Family: Chrysomelidae
- Genus: Altica
- Species: A. ericeti

Binomial name
- Altica ericeti (Allard, 1859)

Synonyms
- Altica britteni Sharp, 1914; Altica longicollis Allard, 1860; Altica sandini Kemner, 1919

Species of beetle

Altica ericeti is a species of leaf beetle in the family Chrysomelidae. It can be found in the Iberian Peninsula, France, England, West Germany, Netherlands, Morocco.
