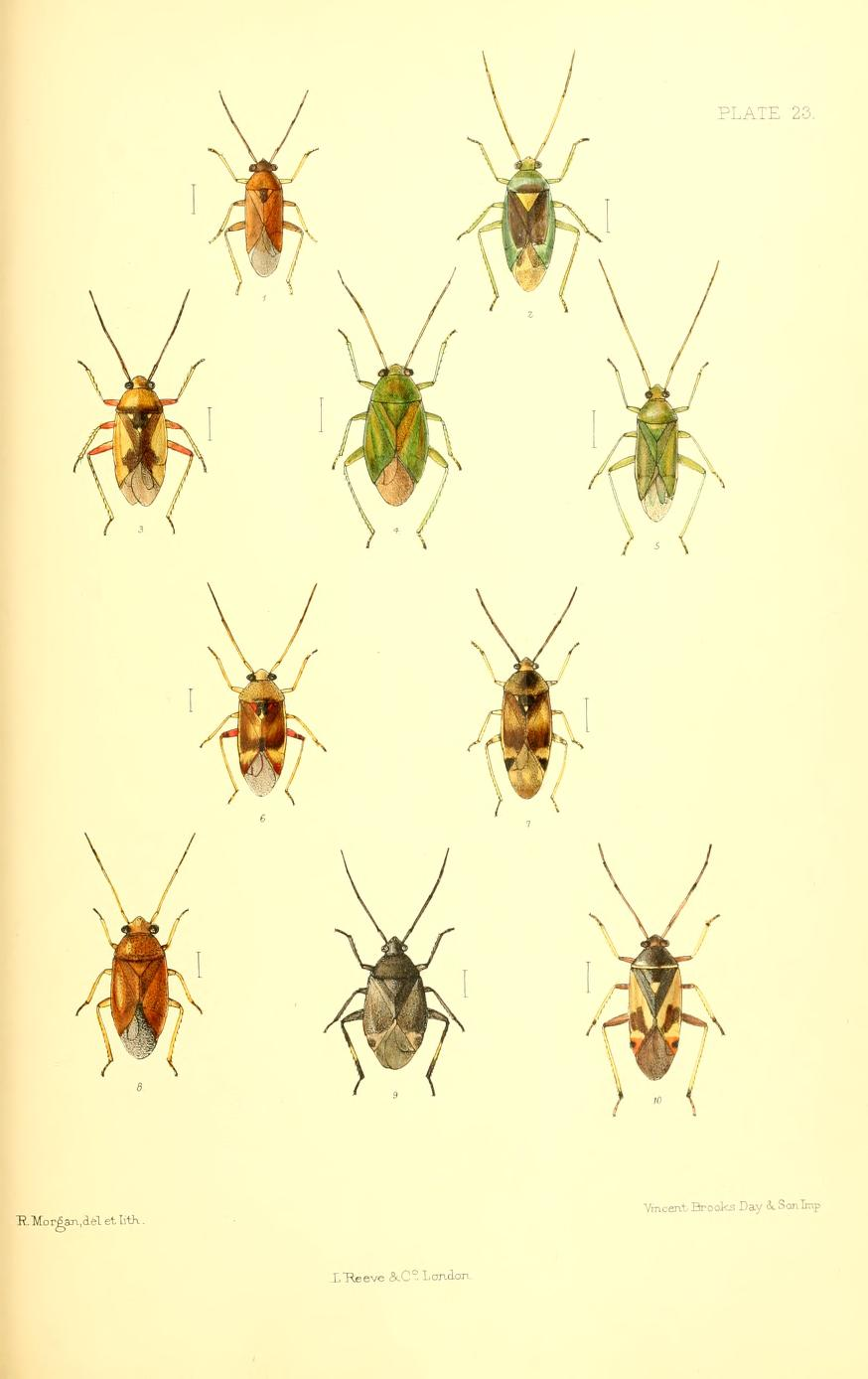
- Pinalitus atomarius depicted in Edward Saunders Hemiptera Heteroptera of the British Islands (figure 1)

Scientific classification
- Kingdom: Animalia
- Phylum: Arthropoda
- Class: Insecta
- Order: Hemiptera
- Suborder: Heteroptera
- Family: Miridae
- Genus: Pinalitus
- Species: P. atomarius

Binomial name
- Pinalitus atomarius (Meyer-Dür, 1843)

= Pinalitus atomarius =

Species of true bug

Pinalitus atomarius is a true bug. The species is found in the Palearctic. It feeds on Picea abies.
