= Adoxia femoralis =

Scientific classification
- Kingdom: Animalia
- Phylum: Arthropoda
- Clade: Pancrustacea
- Class: Insecta
- Order: Coleoptera
- Suborder: Polyphaga
- Infraorder: Cucujiformia
- Family: Chrysomelidae
- Genus: Adoxia
- Species: A. femoralis

Binomial name
- Adoxia femoralis (Allard, 1889)

Synonyms
- Luperus femoralis Allard, 1889; Monolepta blackburni Weise, 1924; Monolepta nigra Weise, 1922; Monolepta nigricornis Blackburn, 1890

Species of beetle

Adoxia femoralis is a species of beetle in the Chrysomelidae family. It was first described in 1889 by Ernest Allard. It has been widely recorded across Australia, including Tasmania, where it was first collected.

Adoxia femoralis measure 3 mm (0.12 in).
