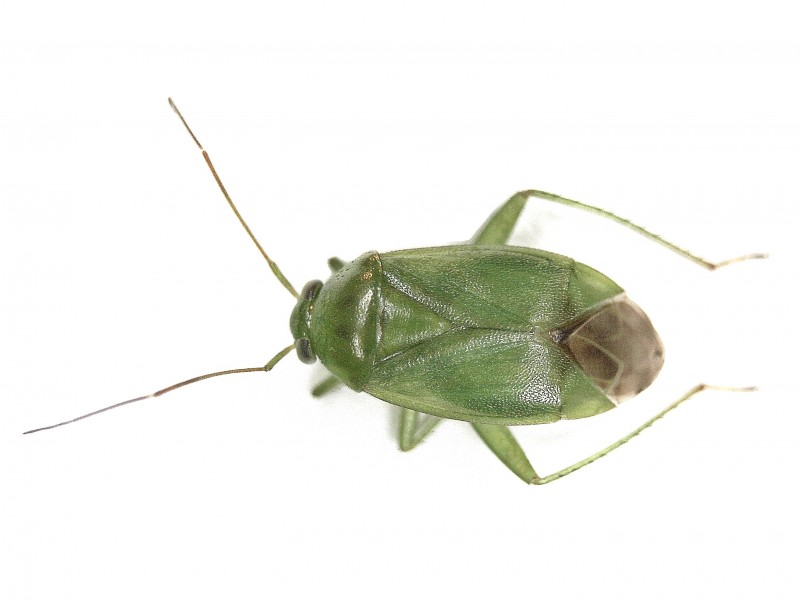
- Apolygus lucorum Elst (Gld), the Netherlands

Scientific classification
- Domain: Eukaryota
- Kingdom: Animalia
- Phylum: Arthropoda
- Class: Insecta
- Order: Hemiptera
- Suborder: Heteroptera
- Family: Miridae
- Genus: Apolygus
- Species: A. lucorum

Binomial name
- Apolygus lucorum Meyer-Dür, 1843

= Apolygus lucorum =

Species of true bug

Apolygus lucorum is a species of true bug in the Miridae family. It can be found everywhere in Europe except for Albania, Bulgaria, Iceland, Malta, and Portugal. and much of the Mediterranean basin, then east across the Palearctic to China and Japan.

== Description ==
Adults are 5–6 millimetres (0.20–0.24 in) long, and are yellowish-green in colour.

== Biology ==
Apolygus lucorum feeds on a range of plants including tansy, nettle, Eupatorium, foxglove, scrub thistle (Cirsium), willowherb (Epilobium) and particularly mugwort piercing the plant tissues and feeding on the sap. Adults are found from July to October.
