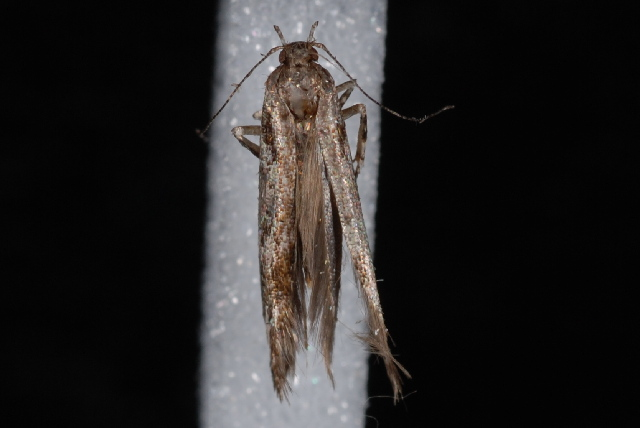

Scientific classification
- Kingdom: Animalia
- Phylum: Arthropoda
- Clade: Pancrustacea
- Class: Insecta
- Order: Lepidoptera
- Family: Gelechiidae
- Genus: Aristotelia
- Species: A. fungivorella

Binomial name
- Aristotelia fungivorella (Clemens, 1865)

Synonyms
- Gelechia fungivorella Clemens, 1865

= Aristotelia fungivorella =

Species of moth

Aristotelia fungivorella is a moth of the family Gelechiidae. It was described by James Brackenridge Clemens in 1865. It is found in North America, where it has been recorded from Ontario to British Columbia, south to California, Mississippi and Alabama.

The wingspan is about 11 mm.

The larvae within galls of Salix cordata and Salix exigua.
