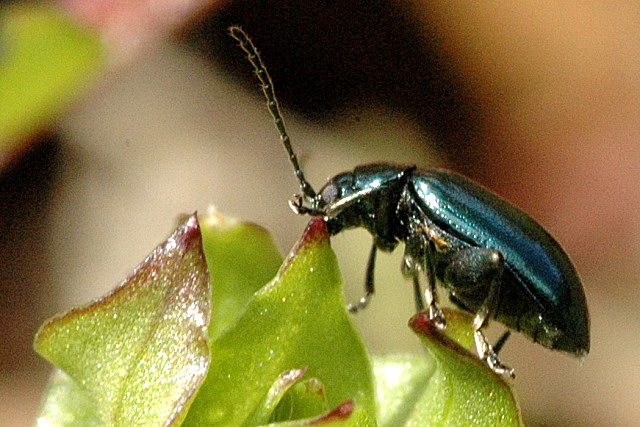

Scientific classification
- Domain: Eukaryota
- Kingdom: Animalia
- Phylum: Arthropoda
- Class: Insecta
- Order: Coleoptera
- Suborder: Polyphaga
- Infraorder: Cucujiformia
- Family: Chrysomelidae
- Genus: Altica
- Species: A. palustris

Binomial name
- Altica palustris Weise, 1888

= Altica palustris =

Species of beetle

Altica palustris is a species of flea beetle from a family of leaf beetles, that can be found in the Palearctic realm, including North Africa.

== Distribution ==
The species can be found in western Palearctic realm, including in eastern Afghanistan, and in countries of North Africa such as Algeria and Tunisia.
