= Pinalitus rubrotinctus =

Scientific classification
- Kingdom: Animalia
- Phylum: Arthropoda
- Class: Insecta
- Order: Hemiptera
- Suborder: Heteroptera
- Family: Miridae
- Tribe: Mirini
- Genus: Pinalitus
- Species: P. rubrotinctus

Binomial name
- Pinalitus rubrotinctus Knight, 1968

Species of true bug

Pinalitus rubrotinctus is a species of plant bug in the family Miridae. It is found in North America.
