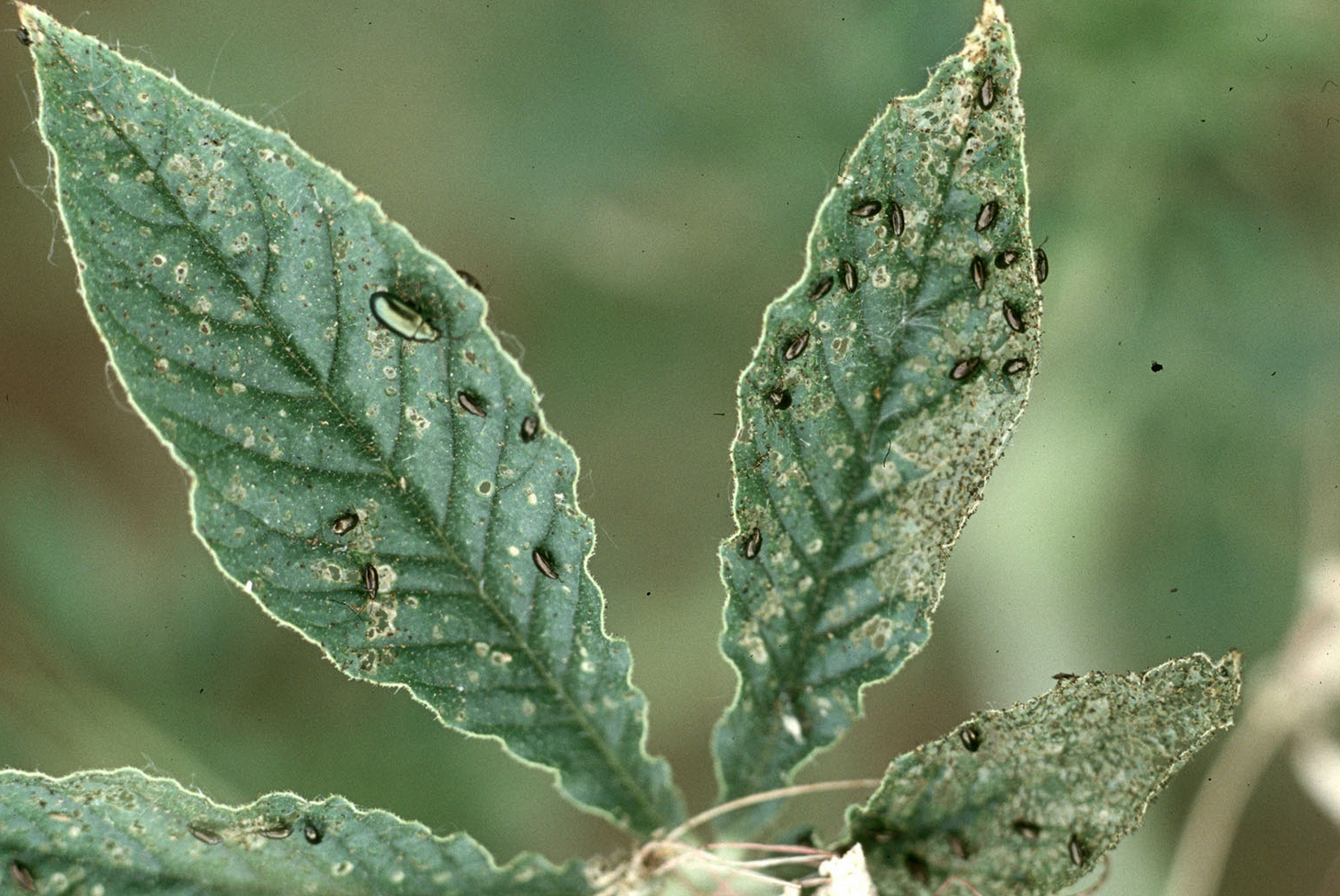
- Altica foliaceae with Phyllotreta cruciferae

Scientific classification
- Kingdom: Animalia
- Phylum: Arthropoda
- Class: Insecta
- Order: Coleoptera
- Suborder: Polyphaga
- Infraorder: Cucujiformia
- Family: Chrysomelidae
- Genus: Altica
- Species: A. foliaceae

Binomial name
- Altica foliaceae J. L. LeConte, 1858

= Altica foliaceae =

Species of beetle

Altica foliaceae, the apple flea beetle, is a species of flea beetle in the family Chrysomelidae. It is found in Central America and North America.
