= Pinalitus approximatus =

Scientific classification
- Kingdom: Animalia
- Phylum: Arthropoda
- Class: Insecta
- Order: Hemiptera
- Suborder: Heteroptera
- Family: Miridae
- Genus: Pinalitus
- Species: P. approximatus

Binomial name
- Pinalitus approximatus (Stal, 1858)

Synonyms
- Deraeocoris approximatus Stål, 1858

Species of true bug

Pinalitus approximatus is a species of plant bug in the family Miridae. It is found in North America.
