= Altica ignita =

Scientific classification
- Kingdom: Animalia
- Phylum: Arthropoda
- Class: Insecta
- Order: Coleoptera
- Suborder: Polyphaga
- Infraorder: Cucujiformia
- Family: Chrysomelidae
- Genus: Altica
- Species: A. ignita

Binomial name
- Altica ignita Illiger, 1807

Species of beetle

Altica ignita, the strawberry flea beetle, is a species of flea beetle in the family Chrysomelidae. It is found in North America.
