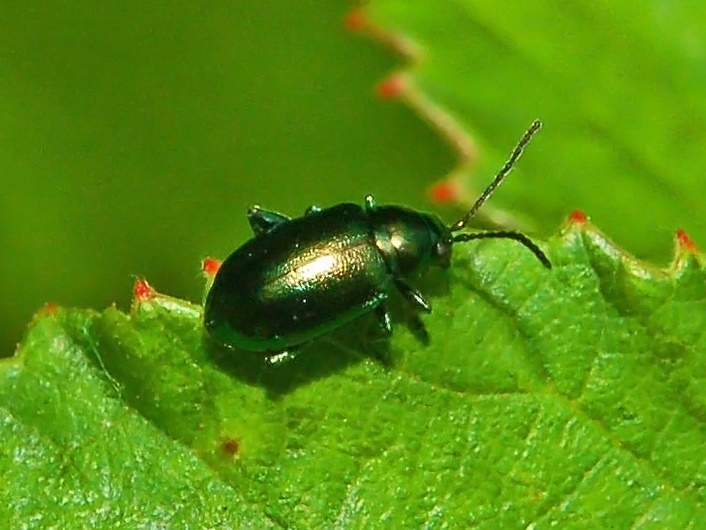

Scientific classification
- Kingdom: Animalia
- Phylum: Arthropoda
- Clade: Pancrustacea
- Class: Insecta
- Order: Coleoptera
- Suborder: Polyphaga
- Infraorder: Cucujiformia
- Family: Chrysomelidae
- Genus: Altica
- Species: A. oleracea

Binomial name
- Altica oleracea (Linnaeus, 1758)

Synonyms
- List: Altica alchemillae (Palij, 1968); Chrysomela oleracea Linnaeus, 1758; Haltica opacifrons Har. Lindberg, 1938; Chrysomela oleracea Linnaeus, 1758; Graptodera sicula Allard, 1859; Altica splendens Mulsant et Rey, 1874; Haltica oleracea var. tenebrosa Rossi, 1882; Haltica oleracea var. nobilis Weise, 1888; Haltica oleracea var. lugubris Weise, 1888; Haltica oleracea var. nigra Fowler, 1890; Haltica ytenensis Sharp, 1914; Haltica oleracea ssp. geminata Ogloblin, 1925

= Altica oleracea =

Deep Green Leaf Beetle

Species of beetle

Altica oleracea, known by the common name deep green leaf beetle, is a species of leaf beetle belonging to the family Chrysomelidae, subfamily Galerucinae.

== Etymology ==
Its specific name oleracea means "related to vegetables/herbs" in Latin and is a form of holeraceus (oleraceus).

== Subspecies ==
Subspecies include:

- Altica oleracea subsp. breddini (Mohr, 1958)
- Altica oleracea subsp. oleracea (Linnaeus, 1758)

== Distribution and habitat ==
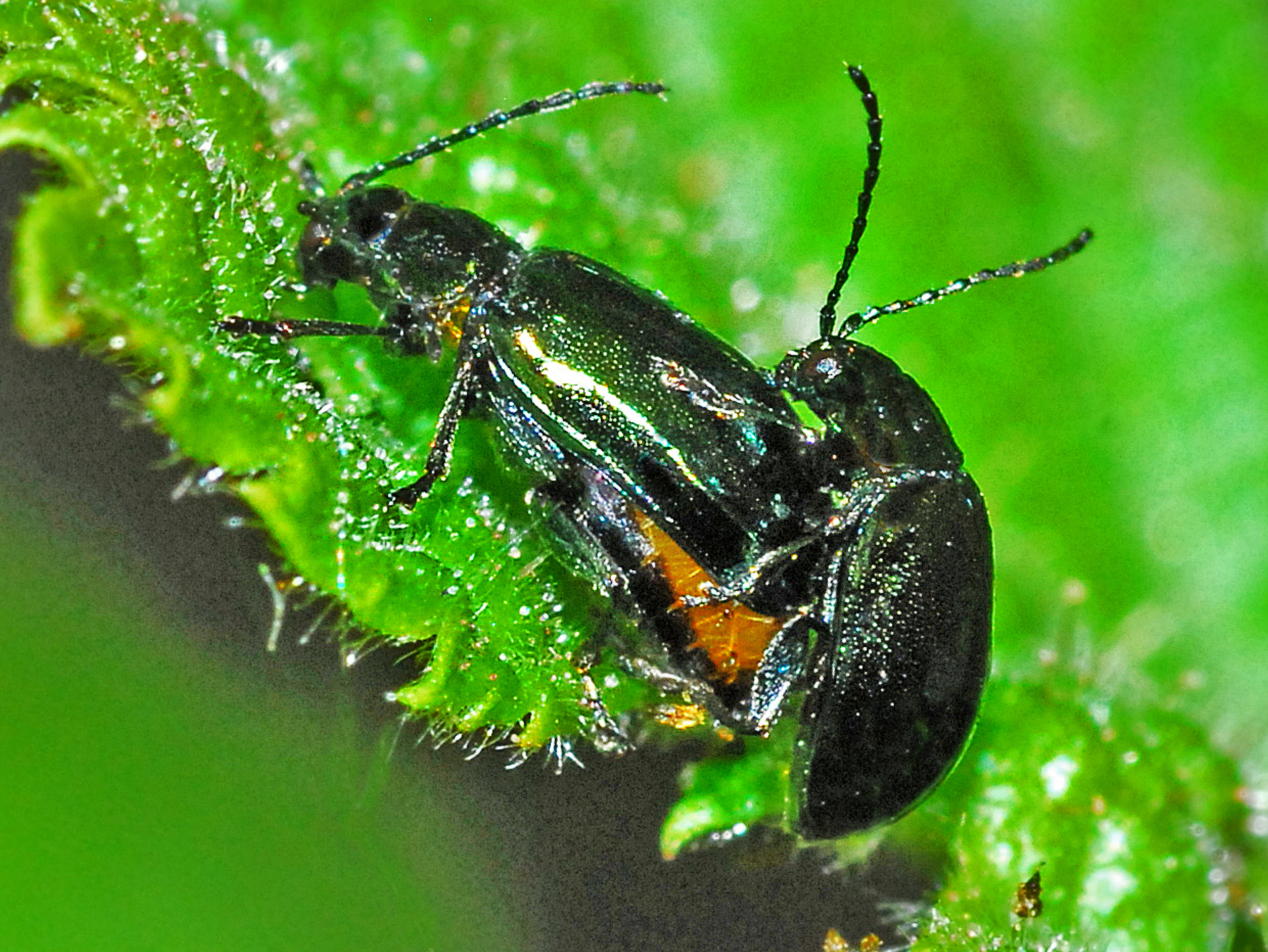
Altica oleracea. Mating

This species is present in whole Palaearctic realm. except Northern Africa. Bushes and shrubs form their typical habitat.

== Description ==
Altica oleracea can reach a body length of about 3–4.2 mm (0.12–0.17 in). Their color varies between metallic green, blue-green, blue to golden green. Legs and antennae are dark. The posterior femora are thickened. The pronotum has a delicate transverse furrow on the basal half. The elytra are finely punctured. Altica oleracea is difficult to distinguish from related species. This is usually only possible by examining the male genitalia.

== Biology ==
These beetles are observed from March to autumn. In early summer they lay their eggs on their host plants, which are also their forage plants. In fact larvae and adults of Altica oleracea are phytophagous, feeding on various plants, especially Onagraceae, Ericaceae and Rosaceae species.

== Bibliography ==
- Anderson, R., Nash, R. & O'Connor, J.P.. 1997, Irish Coleoptera: a revised and annotated list, Irish Naturalists' Journal Special Entomological Supplement, 1-81
- du Chatenet, G, 2000, Coléoptères Phytophages D’Europe, NAP Editions,
- Joy, N.H., 1932, A practical handbook of British beetles, H.F. & G. Witherby,
- This article has been expanded using, inter alia, material based on a translation of an article from the Deutsch Wikipedia, by the same name.
