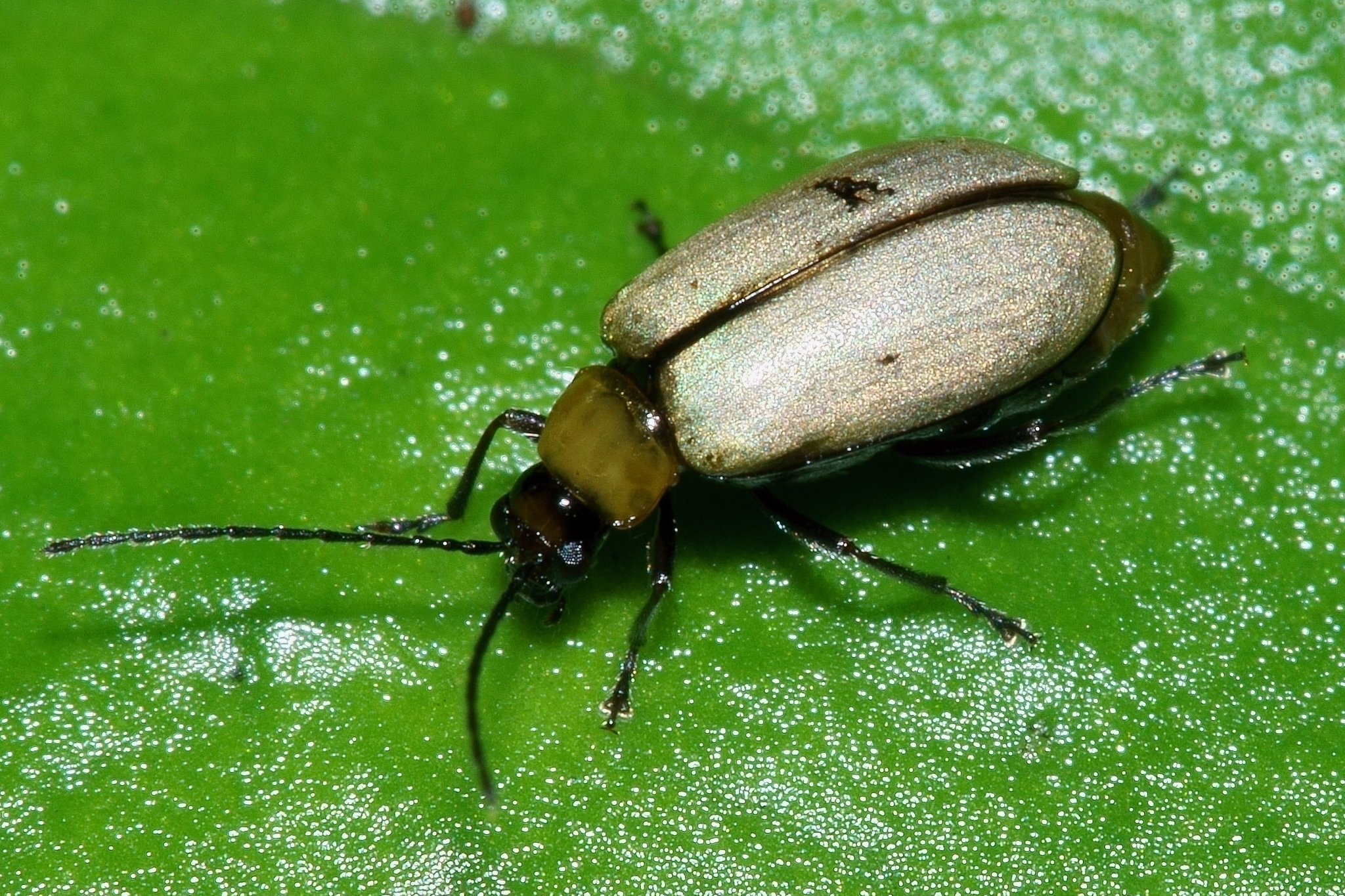
- Adoxia vulgaris, New Zealand

Scientific classification
- Kingdom: Animalia
- Phylum: Arthropoda
- Clade: Pancrustacea
- Class: Insecta
- Order: Coleoptera
- Suborder: Polyphaga
- Infraorder: Cucujiformia
- Family: Chrysomelidae
- Subfamily: Galerucinae
- Tribe: Luperini
- Subtribe: Luperina
- Genus: Adoxia; Broun, 1880

= Adoxia =

Genus of leaf beetles

Adoxia is a genus of skeletonizing leaf beetles in the family Chrysomelidae. There are more than 60 described species in Adoxia, found in Australia and New Zealand.

== Species ==
These 63 species belong to the genus Adoxia:

- Adoxia aenea Broun, 1880
- Adoxia aenescens (Sharp, 1886)
- Adoxia angularia (Broun, 1909)
- Adoxia anthracina (Broun, 1914)
- Adoxia asperella (Broun, 1909)
- Adoxia atripennis (Broun, 1913)
- Adoxia attenuata Broun, 1880
- Adoxia aurella (Broun, 1914)
- Adoxia australis (Jacoby, 1886)
- Adoxia axyrocharis (Broun, 1909)
- Adoxia benallae (Blackburn, 1891)
- Adoxia brevicollis (Broun, 1893)
- Adoxia bullata (Broun, 1914)
- Adoxia calcarata (Broun, 1893)
- Adoxia cheesemani (Broun, 1910)
- Adoxia croceicollis (Germar, 1848)
- Adoxia cyanescens (Broun, 1917)
- Adoxia dilatata (Broun, 1914)
- Adoxia dilucida (Broun, 1917)
- Adoxia dilutipes (Broun, 1915)
- Adoxia discrepans (Broun, 1914)
- Adoxia diversa (Broun, 1910)
- Adoxia femoralis (Allard, 1889)
- Adoxia foveigera (Broun, 1913)
- Adoxia fuscata (Broun, 1893)
- Adoxia fuscifrons (Broun, 1910)
- Adoxia gracilipes (Broun, 1917)
- Adoxia halli (Broun, 1917)
- Adoxia insolita (Broun, 1914)
- Adoxia iridescens (Broun, 1914)
- Adoxia lewisi (Broun, 1909)
- Adoxia mediocris (Broun, 1917)
- Adoxia minor (Broun, 1917)
- Adoxia modesta (Blackburn, 1888)
- Adoxia mollis (Broun, 1893)
- Adoxia monticola (Broun, 1893)
- Adoxia nigricans Broun, 1880
- Adoxia nigricornis (Sharp, 1886)
- Adoxia nitidicollis Broun, 1880
- Adoxia nodicollis (Broun, 1915)
- Adoxia obscura (Broun, 1910)
- Adoxia oconnori (Broun, 1913)
- Adoxia oleareae (Broun, 1893)
- Adoxia palialis (Broun, 1909)
- Adoxia perplexa (Broun, 1917)
- Adoxia princeps (Broun, 1893)
- Adoxia proletaria (Weise, 1924)
- Adoxia pubicollis (Broun, 1915)
- Adoxia puncticollis (Sharp, 1886)
- Adoxia quadricollis (Broun, 1917)
- Adoxia rectipes (Broun, 1893)
- Adoxia rugicollis (Broun, 1893)
- Adoxia scutellaris (Broun, 1909)
- Adoxia simmondsi (Broun, 1913)
- Adoxia somersetensis (Weise, 1916)
- Adoxia sordidula (Weise, 1924)
- Adoxia sulcifera (Broun, 1893)
- Adoxia truncata (Broun, 1893)
- Adoxia vestitus (Weise, 1924)
- Adoxia vilis (Weise, 1924)
- Adoxia viridis Broun, 1880
- Adoxia vulgaris Broun, 1880
- Adoxia xenoscelis (Broun, 1917)
