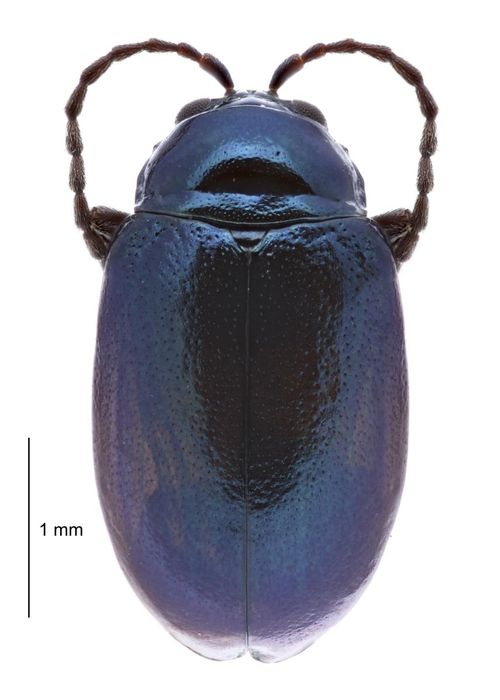
- Museum specimen

Scientific classification
- Kingdom: Animalia
- Phylum: Arthropoda
- Class: Insecta
- Order: Coleoptera
- Suborder: Polyphaga
- Infraorder: Cucujiformia
- Family: Chrysomelidae
- Genus: Altica
- Species: A. cirsicola

Binomial name
- Altica cirsicola Ohno, 1960

= Altica cirsicola =

Species of beetle

Altica cirsicola is a species of flea beetle from the genus Altica, which belongs to the family Chrysomelidae (commonly known as leaf beetles). A. cirsicola is found throughout East Asia. Adults feed exclusively on plants from the genus Cirsium. This food resource provides the species with the opportunity to create holes in the leaves of the plant, which helps to provide the beetles with camouflage and protection from predators.

Both male and female A. cirsicola make multiple matings throughout their lives. A. cirsicola males have been discovered to exhibit mate choice, using cuticular hydrocarbons (CHCs) as one of several signals to help them identify potential mates.

A. cirsicola have the ability to jump extensive distances, which provides them with a method of escaping predators. The jumping mechanism of A. cirsicola and other flea beetles has been described to be extremely efficient, and several studies have been conducted to analyze this jumping ability. The jumping mechanism of A. cirsicola and other flea beetles has led to a proposed design for a robotic bionic leg that can jump.

A. cirsicola have microbial communities contained within their gut. This microbiome has been compared to microbiomes of other sympatric Altica species, and it is believed that the presence of such bacterial communities may provide several benefits to the beetles.

== Geographic range ==
Although beetles of the genus Altica are widely distributed throughout the world, A. cirsicola is primarily distributed throughout East Asia. The species is native to the countries of Japan and China. More recent reports have also found the species in other regions, with a 2024 publication reporting the first documented presence of the species in Russia. A. cirsicola also has had a reported presence in both North and South Korea, and there is a particular recording of the species in Mt. Hallasan National Park. Although A. cirsicola is nearly identical morphologically to Altica carduorum, A. carduorum is instead native to Europe.

== Food resources ==
Like many other leaf beetle species, A. cirsicola is an herbivore that feeds on the leaves of plants. A. cirsicola only eats plants that are from the genus Cirsium. In particular, the species is known to feed on Cirsium setosum.

When A. cirsicola feeds on C. setosum, the beetle makes specialized holes in the leaves of the plant. The holes that are created in the plant are typically about half of the size of the insect's body and are usually uniform. The anatomy of A. cirsicola, particularly the volume of its foregut and the restricted range of motion in the head-prothorax region, limits the size of the hole that the beetle creates while feeding. The presence of these holes also makes it more difficult to visually recognize the beetles, so they serve as a form of camouflage.

== Life history ==
Like other species of beetles, A. cirsicola develops through a metamorphosis process.

=== Eggs ===
The eggs of beetles from the Altica genus are oval in shape and have a length of about 1 to 2 mm. Females lay clutches of 1 to 15 eggs on the top or the bottom surface of the leaves.

=== Larvae ===
Eggs develop into larvae in about 5 to 8 days, which have a dark brown to black color. The larvae from the Altica genus typically have a length of about 5.2 mm. The body structure of the larvae in this genus is composed of 10 distinct segments. The larvae live and feed on the leaves where they are oviposited. There are three instars during the larval stage where the smaller larvae typically live at the bottom of the host leaves and the larger larvae live at the top and feed on the leaves of the host plants.

=== Pupae ===
Larvae of the Altica genus leave the host plant and pupate into the ground or leaf litter. The larvae form a case for themselves to live through the pupation and overwinter, which is made of mucus from the maxillary glands.

=== Adult ===
Pupation ends in the spring following birth, and adult beetles emerge from the case. Adults feed on the leaves of the host plant, which is from the Cirsium genus. Adult females generally have a larger body size than adult males. The location of Altica beetles can influence the number of generations that are produced per year. Adults living in northern regions usually only have one generation of offspring per year, but adult beetles living in southern regions may have more.

== Protective behavior ==
=== Hole-feeding camouflage ===
A. cirsicola, along with some other leaf beetle species, create uniform holes while they feed on the leaves of their host plant food resources. These holes help to camouflage the species by changing the background environment of which the beetle interacts. This camouflage is effective against humans. The difficulty in identifying the beetles increases when there were more holes present in the leaves and when the size of the holes were similar to the size of the beetles. The species may also optimize their feeding to allow for hole sizes and quantities that increase the efficacy of its camouflage. The primary predators that have led to the hole-feeding camouflage behavior are likely birds. Because birds primarily use visual cues to find the insects, it is believed that the hole-feeding camouflage greatly helps the beetles avoid such predators.

=== Jumping ===
Another behavior that A. cirsicola exhibits that helps it to avoid predators is jumping. Jumping is a protective behavior found among many insects, but there have been extensive studies investigating the mechanisms of jumping in A. cirsicola and other flea beetles. A. cirsicola is able to jump far distances that are much longer in length than its own body length. In the wild, it is believed that the species jumps into leave clusters to quickly escape from predators.

== Genetics ==
=== Comparison with A. carduorum ===
A. cirsicola and A. carduorum are two beetle species from the Altica genus that are very similar physiologically. Both have features such as elongated body shapes and slightly convex sides. Their body and appendages both have a dark metallic blue color with faint purple coloring. These beetles also show genetic similarity. There were 39 and 27 amplifiable and informative loci for A. carduorum and A. cirsicola, respectively. The genetic variation between the two species was 20%. Genetic similarity among the two species was low. This level was at 46%. This shows that A. carduorum and A. cirsicola are sibling species due to their morphological similarities. They are reproductively isolated. The genetic differences between A. caruorum and A. cirsicola indicate that they should be treated as two different species in the context of using them as control agents, particularly for the potential use of them as control agents for the Canada thistle.

=== Comparison with A. fragariae and A. viridicyanea ===
A. cirsicola, A. fragariae, and A. viridicyanea are three species of Altica beetles that are sympatric, meaning that they live in the same general geographic location. Although the three species of beetles use plants from different families as their food resources, the three species of beetles are very similar morphologically. A study by Nie et al. (2019) used mitochondrial genomes and phylogenetic analysis to determine differences between the three beetle species. This study found that while A. fragariae is more distantly related to the other two species, A. cirsicola and A. virdicyanea are highly similar. Using mitochondrial genomes to create distance-based or tree-based phylogenies alone could not distinguish between A. cirsicola and A. virdicyanea reliably. Although their mitochondrial genomes are very similar, the beetle species can be distinguished from each other using other methods, such as identifying the plants that the beetles feed on or physical features like the genitalia of male beetles.

== Mating ==
Like other Altica species, A. cirsicola males and females mate multiple times throughout their lives. Both males and females may have multiple sexual partners throughout their lives. Copulation in the species typically has a duration of approximately 20 minutes. After copulation, mate guarding may occur, which may prevent other opportunities to mate for the beetle that is guarded. This mate guarding may occur for multiple hours after copulation.

=== Male choice ===
Although male mate choice is typically less common in animals, it has been found that male mate choice may be selected for in A. cirsicola. Because A. cirsicola populations have generations that overlap and are typically clustered together, males of the species usually encounter both sexually immature and mature females, and also may encounter other males or even beetles of other Altica species. Because of the wide variety of encounters that male A. cirsicola have during their lives, they are able to identify the sex of other individuals and, if they are female, whether or not they are sexually mature.

It has been found that A. cirsicola males do not use behavioral cues to find mates. Cuticular hydrocarbons (CHCs) play a role in identifying potential mates. CHCs are chains of hydrocarbons that cover the cuticles of most insects that typically play roles in communication and providing waterproofing qualities. In A. cirsicola, the chemical makeup of CHCs differ by sex and sexual maturity. Males may use an assessment of these differences to help them identify mates. However, it is believed by researchers that other unknown signals also play a role in male mate choice, and the use of CHCs is only one component.

== Physiology ==
Adult Altica cirsicola have a width of approximately 2 mm and a length of approximately 4 mm. The adult beetles have wings that are often used to assist with jumping. Their body shapes are elongated and their sides are somewhat convex. They are a dark blue in color and have a metallic quality, along with some purple tones. A. cirsicola is very visually similar to another flea beetle species, Altica carduorum, and it is very difficult to reliably distinguish between the two species morphologically. Despite their morphological similarities, DNA analysis suggests that the two are separate species.

=== Jumping mechanism ===
A. cirsicola has the ability to jump, which allows it to quickly escape from predators. The jumping process of A. cirsicola, along with several other flea beetles, has been described to consist of four steps. The first step is a preparation phase, where the beetle contracts the muscles in its hind legs. The second step is an initiation phase, where strain is built up in the femur, allowing the femur to act somewhat like a catapult. The third step is very brief, and it consists of an accumulation of strain that can no longer be held, leading to the trigger of the jump. Finally, in the fourth step, the beetle is catapulted from the ground and the strain is released so the muscles start to relax.

The jumping mechanism of A. cirsicola and other flea beetles is described to be very efficient, as it allows the beetles to jump extremely far distances relative to the length of their body in a very short amount of time. Furthermore, the beetles are able to jump repeatedly for over 30 jumps without becoming tired. The efficient nature of the jumping mechanism in these beetles has inspired a design of a bionic leg that can jump, which could possibly be used in robots.

In a study with varying inclined landing platforms, A. cirsicola exhibited three noticeably different modes of jumping. One mode is termed the "wingless mode", in which the wings of the beetle are closed while it jumps and remain closed while in the air. Another mode is termed the "intermediate mode", in which the wings of the beetle are closed initially but are then opened while in the air. It is suspected that in this mode, the wings are opened to help reduce spinning. The last mode is termed the "winged mode", where the beetle uses its wings by flapping while taking off. In the study, the "wingless mode" was the most common mode used to jump, but most individuals preferred a particular mode. The use of wings led to slower jumps, which decreased the impact of the landing on the beetles.

== Microbiome ==
A. cirsicola have microbial communities in their gut that may provide several benefits. Treating Altica beetles (specifically A. cirsicola, A. fragariae, and A. viridicyanea) with antibiotics leads to negative effects on the development of the beetles. The microbiomes in these species may provide several benefits, such as providing nutrients that may promote growth and helping with the digestion of compounds from plant food resources that may be toxic to the beetles.

Although the three aforementioned species of Altica beetles feed on different species of plants, the bacterial communities do not significantly vary between the species. Thus, it is believed that the three sympatric Altica beetles may obtain their gut microbiome from a shared source, such as the soil, rather than from their respective plant food resources. Although no significant differences in the gut bacterial composition have been found across the three species, the geographic location in which the beetles are obtained does have an effect on the types of bacteria present in their gut.

=== Wolbachia infection ===
Wolbachia are bacteria that can live inside beetles and impact their reproductive isolation. Unidirectional cytoplasmic incompatibility (CI) and high Wolbachia infection rates are seen in Altica beetles. Cytoplasmic incompatibility is a form of mating incompatibility that is caused by Wolbachia infection that is commonly seen in arthropod species. When cytoplasmic incompatibility occurs, males that are infected are capable of mating with and reproducing with females that are also infected with Wolbachia, but the males are actually sterile and cannot reproduce with females that are not infected.

In a 2019 study by Wei et al. investigating the effects of Wolbachia on Altica species, Wolbachia had a 100% infection rate in A. cirsicola. The study used multilocus sequence typing (MLST) markers to identify the types of Wolbachia that infected the Altica beetles. Wolbachia genes showed three sequence types in A. cirsicola. The dominant strain type ST505 was in A. cirsicola. Phylogenetic analysis revealed 7 Wolbachia sequences were under a supergroup called supergroup B. The dominant Wolbachia strain in A. cirsicola (ST505) is related to ST348 which is a strain in supergroup A.

To investigate Wolbachia's effect on mating, infected males were crossed with cured females. This revealed no changes in hatching success. Antibiotics had no effect on hatching success either. CI from Wolbachia can also lead to new insect species. Multiple Wolbachia strains in different species of Altica beetles but no change in hatching success shows CI does not play a factor in reproduction in the Altica beetles specifically.

== Interaction with environment ==
A. cirsicola may serve as a potential biological control method for the Canada thistle, Cirsium arvense. The Canada thistle is an invasive species of plant that is known to lead to crop damage. A similar species of beetle, Altica carduorum, was used in the 1960s as a method of controlling the Canada thistle in North America, but this effort was not effective. Preliminary findings have suggested that A. cirsicola may be another potential method of controlling the Canada thistle.
