= Altica tamaricis =

Scientific classification
- Kingdom: Animalia
- Phylum: Arthropoda
- Class: Insecta
- Order: Coleoptera
- Suborder: Polyphaga
- Infraorder: Cucujiformia
- Family: Chrysomelidae
- Genus: Altica
- Species: A. tamaricis

Binomial name
- Altica tamaricis Schrank, 1785

Synonyms
- Galleruca erucae Fabricius, 1792; Haltica oleracea var. cyanea Illiger, 1807 nec Weber, 1801; Galleruca articulata Beck, 1817; Haltica consobrina Duftschmidt, 1825; Altica hippophaes Aubé, 1843; Haltica laeviuscula Weise, 1889 nec Harold, 1875; Haltica laeviuscula var. viridi-aenea Weise, 1889; Haltica weisei Jacobson, 1892; Haltica lazulina Ogloblin, 1921; Haltica tamaricis ab. nigra Tenenbaum, 1927

Species of beetle

Altica tamaricis is a species of flea beetle from the family of leaf beetles, that can be found in Europe.

== Subspecies ==
The species bears two subspecies:

- Altica tamaricis franzi (Kral, 1966)
- Altica tamaricis tamaricis Schrank, 1785
