= Altica knabii =

Scientific classification
- Kingdom: Animalia
- Phylum: Arthropoda
- Class: Insecta
- Order: Coleoptera
- Suborder: Polyphaga
- Infraorder: Cucujiformia
- Family: Chrysomelidae
- Genus: Altica
- Species: A. knabii

Binomial name
- Altica knabii Blatchley, 1910

Species of beetle

Altica knabii is a species in the tribe Alticini ("flea beetles"), in the subfamily Galerucinae ("skeletonizing leaf beetles and flea beetles"). It is found in North America. It overwinters in leaf litter and is associated with Oenothera biennis.
