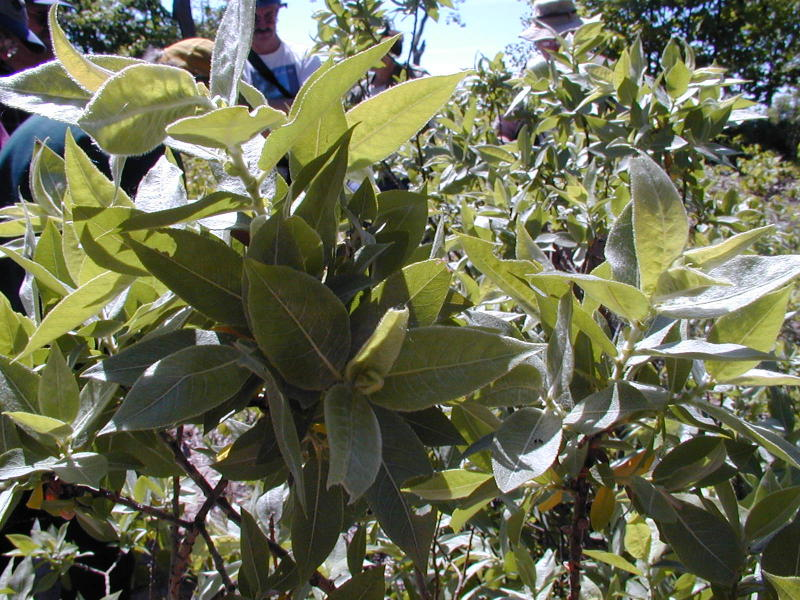
- Salix cordata - sand dune willow

Scientific classification
- Kingdom: Plantae
- Clade: Tracheophytes
- Clade: Angiosperms
- Clade: Eudicots
- Clade: Rosids
- Order: Malpighiales
- Family: Salicaceae
- Genus: Salix
- Species: S. cordata

Binomial name
- Salix cordata Michx.

Synonyms
- Salix adenophylla; Salix syrticola

= Salix cordata =

Species of shrub

Salix cordata, the sand dune willow, furry willow, or heartleaf willow, is a perennial shrub that grows 3 to 12 feet (0.91 to 3.66 m) tall; plants taller than 6 feet (1.8 m) are rare. The plant is native to the northeast regions of the North American continent; it is found on sand dunes, river banks, and lake shores in sandy, silty or gravelly soils.

== Ecology ==
Salix cordata is the host species of the specialist herbivore beetle Altica subplicata. It is found in the sand dunes of lakes, such as Lake Michigan.

Salix cordata readily hybridizes with Salix eriocephala.

== Distribution ==
In Canada the range of Salix cordata extends from Ontario to Newfoundland and Labrador, descending south into the American states of Illinois and Pennsylvania. Because it is a freshwater species, it is not native to Canadian Atlantic provinces, such as Nova Scotia.

=== Conservation efforts ===
Although not listed on the federal Endangered Species Act of 1973, Salix cordata is endangered in Wisconsin.

== Uses ==
Salix cordata has been used in revegetation efforts around former coal mines in New Brunswick, Canada. It is one of the fastest growing and most easily propagated of eight different Salix species being tested for biomass production.
