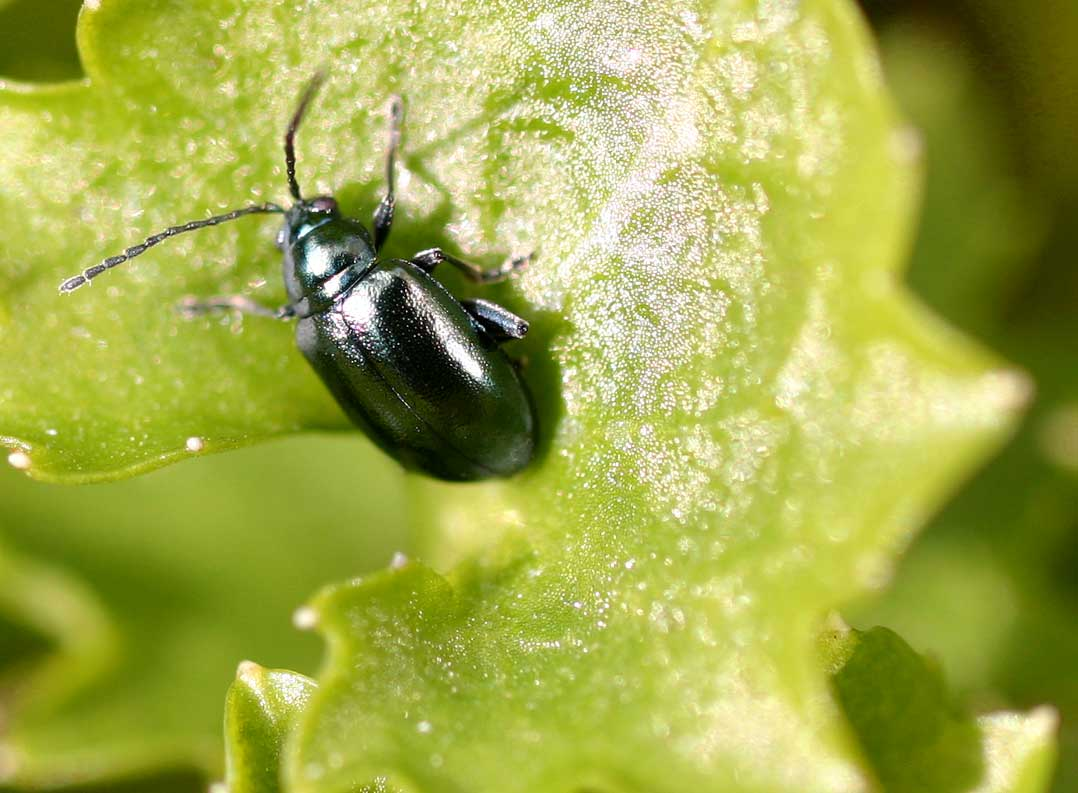
- A. oleracea

Scientific classification
- Kingdom: Animalia
- Phylum: Arthropoda
- Class: Insecta
- Order: Coleoptera
- Suborder: Polyphaga
- Infraorder: Cucujiformia
- Family: Chrysomelidae
- Tribe: Alticini
- Genus: Altica; Geoffroy, 1762

Synonyms
- Haltica Illiger, 1801 (unjustified emendation) Graptodera Chevrolat, 1836 Rybakowia Jacobson, 1892

= Altica =

Genus of beetles

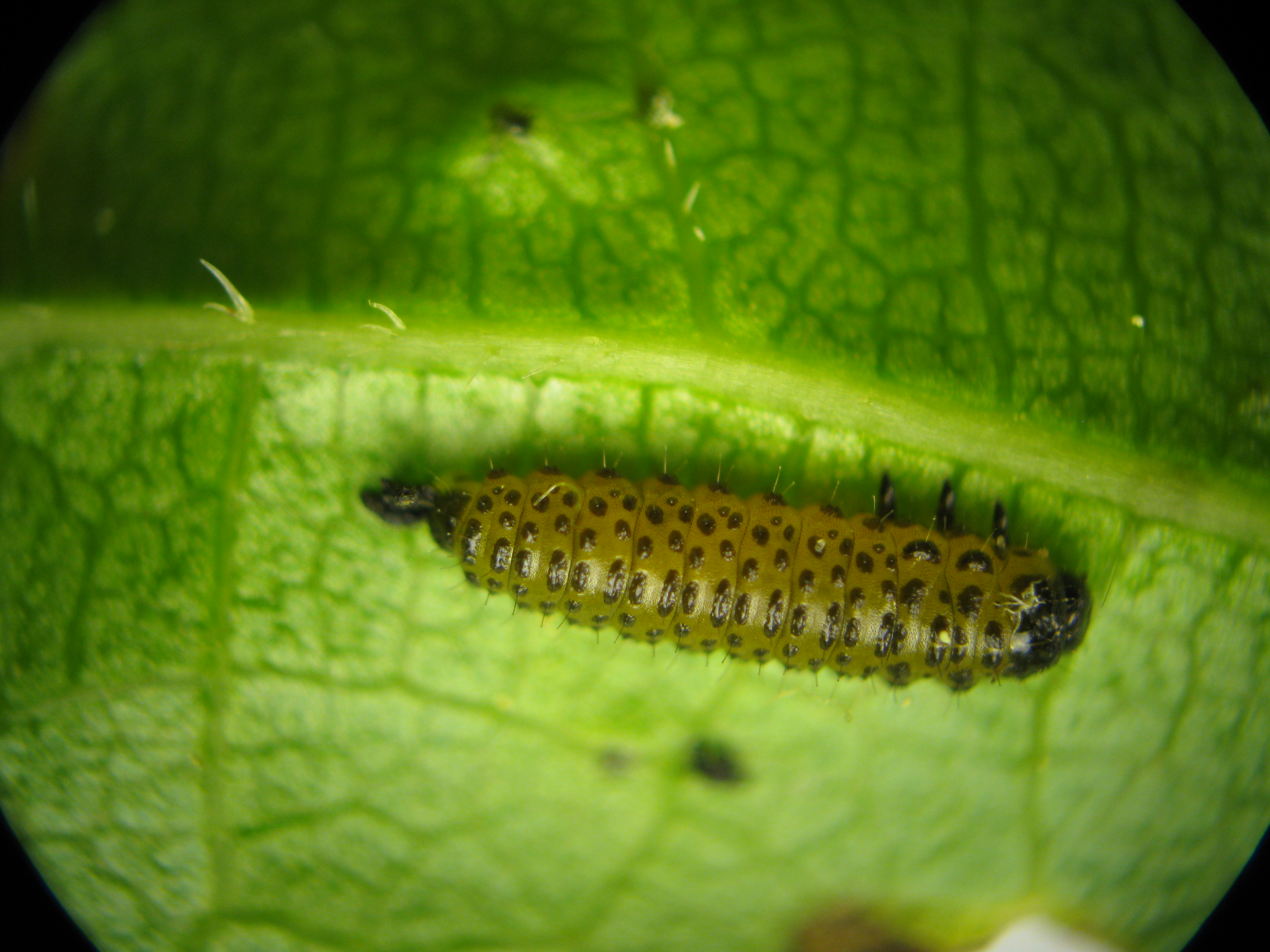
Altica sp. larva

Altica (Neo-Latin from Greek ἁλτικός, haltikós, "jumper" or "jumping") is a large genus of flea beetles in the subfamily Galerucinae, with about 300 species, distributed nearly worldwide. The genus is best represented in the Neotropical realm, well represented in the Nearctic and Palearctic, but occurs also in the Afrotropic, Indomalaya, and Australasia. The species are similar to each other, small metallic blue-green-bronze beetles, often distinguished from each other only by the aedeagus. The species of Altica, both as larvae and as adults, are phytophagous, feeding on plant foliage of various food plant taxa, specific for each Altica species. Onagraceae and Rosaceae (mainly Rubus) are the dominant host plant families for Holarctic species. The adult Altica beetles are able to jump away when approached.

== Selected species ==
- Altica aeneola J. L. LeConte, 1859
- Altica aenescens Weise, 1888
- Altica aeruginosa J. L. LeConte, 1859
- Altica ambiens J. L. LeConte, 1859 (alder flea beetle)
- Altica amoena Horn, 1889
- Altica betulae Schaeffer, 1924
- Altica bicarinata Kutschera, 1860
- Altica bimarginata Say, 1824
- Altica birmanensis Jacoby, 1896
- Altica blanchardi Fall, 1920
- Altica brisleyi Gentner, 1928
- Altica browni Mohamedsaid, 1984
- Altica californica (Mannerheim, 1843)
- Altica canadensis Gentner, 1926
- Altica carduorum (Guérin-Méneville, 1858)
- Altica carinata Germar, 1824
- Altica caurina Blake, 1936
- Altica chalybea Illiger, 1807 (grape flea beetle)
- Altica cirsicola Ohno, 1960
- Altica convicta Fall, 1910
- Altica corni Woods, 1918 (dogwood flea beetle)
- Altica cuprascens Blatchley, 1910
- Altica cupreola Fall, 1926
- Altica elongatula Csiki in Heikertinger and Csiki, 1939
- Altica ericeti (Allard, 1859)
- Altica floridana Horn, 1889
- Altica foliaceae J. L. LeConte, 1858 (apple flea beetle)
- Altica fragariae Nakane, 1955
- Altica fuscoaenea (F. E. Melsheimer, 1847)
- Altica gloriosa Blatchley, 1921
- Altica guatemalensis Jacoby, 1884
- Altica heucherae Fall, 1920
- Altica humboldtensis Fall, 1922
- Altica ignita Illiger, 1807 (strawberry flea beetle)
- Altica inaerata J. L. LeConte, 1860
- Altica kalmiae (F. E. Melsheimer, 1847)
- Altica knabii Blatchley, 1910
- Altica lazulina J. L. LeConte, 1857
- Altica liebecki Schaeffer, 1924
- Altica litigata Fall, 1910 (crepe myrtle flea beetle)
- Altica ludoviciana (Fall, 1910)
- Altica lythri Aubé, 1843
- Altica marevagans Horn, 1889
- Altica nancyae Stirret, 1933
- Altica napensis Blake, 1936
- Altica nigrina Csiki in Heikertinger and Csiki, 1939
- Altica nipponica Ohno, 1960
- Altica obliterata J. L. LeConte, 1859
- Altica obolina J. L. LeConte, 1857
- Altica oleracea (Linnaeus, 1758)
- Altica olivieriana Warchalowski, 2000
- Altica opulenta Horn, 1889
- Altica oregonensis Schaeffer, 1932
- Altica ovulata Fall, 1910
- Altica palustris Weise, 1888
- Altica pedipallida LeSage, 2008
- Altica prasina J. L. LeConte, 1857
- Altica pretiosa Schaeffer, 1932
- Altica probata Fall, 1910
- Altica purpurea Fall, 1920
- Altica quercetorum Foudras, 1860
- Altica ribis Brown, 1946
- Altica rosae Woods, 1918
- Altica schwarzi Blatchley, 1914
- Altica subcostata LeSage, 1990
- Altica subopaca Schaeffer, 1932
- Altica subplicata J. L. LeConte, 1859
- Altica suspecta Fall, 1910
- Altica sylvia Malloch, 1919
- Altica tamaricis Schrank, 1785
  - Altica tamaricis franzi Kral, 1966
  - Altica tamaricis tamaricis Schrank, 1785
- Altica testacea Fall, 1910
- Altica texana Schaeffer, 1906
- Altica tincta J. L. LeConte, 1859
- Altica tombacina Mannerheim, 1853
- Altica torquata J. L. LeConte, 1858 (steel-blue grapevine flea beetle)
- Altica ulmi Woods, 1918
- Altica vaccinia Blatchley, 1916
- Altica vialis Fall, 1920
- Altica viatica Blatchley, 1921
- Altica vicaria Horn, 1889
- Altica viridicyanea (Baly, 1874)
- Altica vitiosa Blatchley, 1928
- Altica woodsi Isely, 1920
