= Altica vaccinia =

Scientific classification
- Kingdom: Animalia
- Phylum: Arthropoda
- Class: Insecta
- Order: Coleoptera
- Suborder: Polyphaga
- Infraorder: Cucujiformia
- Family: Chrysomelidae
- Genus: Altica
- Species: A. vaccinia

Binomial name
- Altica vaccinia Blatchley, 1916

Species of beetle

Altica vaccinia is a species of flea beetle in the family Chrysomelidae. It is found in North America.
