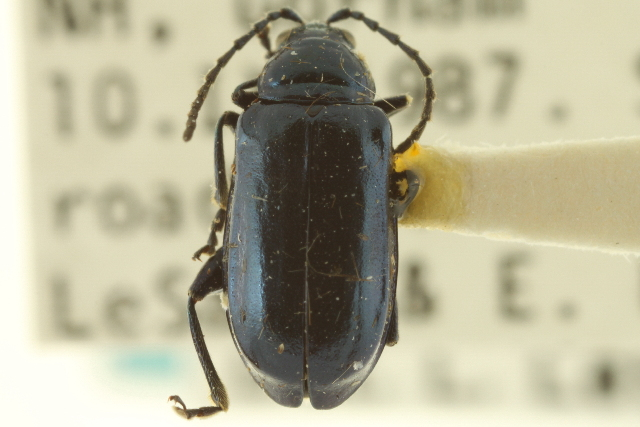

Scientific classification
- Kingdom: Animalia
- Phylum: Arthropoda
- Class: Insecta
- Order: Coleoptera
- Suborder: Polyphaga
- Infraorder: Cucujiformia
- Family: Chrysomelidae
- Genus: Altica
- Species: A. bimarginata

Binomial name
- Altica bimarginata Say, 1824

= Altica bimarginata =

Species of beetle

Altica bimarginata, the willow flea beetle is a species of flea beetle in the family Chrysomelidae. It is found in Central America and North America. It often is found feeding on plants from the Salix genus. It is shiny blue, being 5-6 mm long and 2-3 mm wide.

== Subspecies ==
These three subspecies belong to the species Altica bimarginata:

- Altica bimarginata bimarginata Say, 1824
- Altica bimarginata labradorensis LeSage, 1993
- Altica bimarginata plicipennis (Mannerheim, 1843)
