= Pinalitus rubricatus =

Scientific classification
- Kingdom: Animalia
- Phylum: Arthropoda
- Class: Insecta
- Order: Hemiptera
- Suborder: Heteroptera
- Family: Miridae
- Genus: Pinalitus
- Species: P. rubricatus

Binomial name
- Pinalitus rubricatus (Fallén, 1807)

Species of true bug

Pinalitus rubricatus is a species of plant bug in the family Miridae. It is found in the Palearctic and North America.
