= Altica tamaricis tamaricis =

Scientific classification
- Kingdom: Animalia
- Phylum: Arthropoda
- Class: Insecta
- Order: Coleoptera
- Suborder: Polyphaga
- Infraorder: Cucujiformia
- Family: Chrysomelidae
- Genus: Altica
- Species: A. tamaricis
- Subspecies: A. t. tamaricis

Trinomial name
- Altica tamaricis tamaricis Schrank, 1785

Subspecies of beetle

Altica tamaricis is a species of flea beetle from the family of leaf beetles that can be found everywhere in Europe and Near East.
