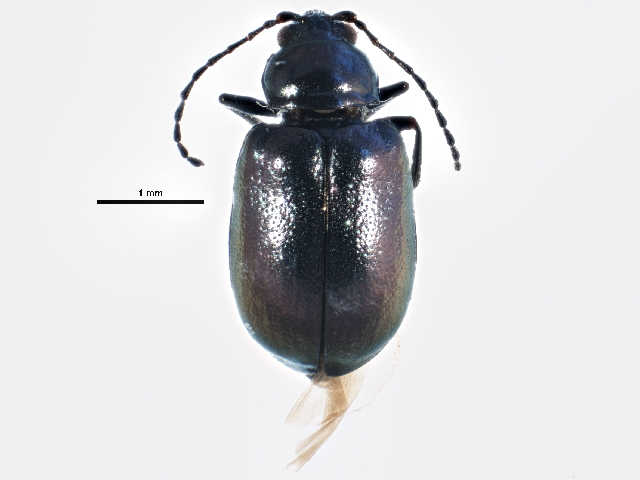

Scientific classification
- Kingdom: Animalia
- Phylum: Arthropoda
- Class: Insecta
- Order: Coleoptera
- Suborder: Polyphaga
- Infraorder: Cucujiformia
- Family: Chrysomelidae
- Genus: Altica
- Species: A. corni

Binomial name
- Altica corni Woods, 1918

= Altica corni =

Species of beetle

Altica corni, the dogwood flea beetle, is a species of flea beetle in the family Chrysomelidae. It is found in North America.
