= Altica woodsi =

Scientific classification
- Kingdom: Animalia
- Phylum: Arthropoda
- Class: Insecta
- Order: Coleoptera
- Suborder: Polyphaga
- Infraorder: Cucujiformia
- Family: Chrysomelidae
- Genus: Altica
- Species: A. woodsi

Binomial name
- Altica woodsi Isely, 1920

Species of beetle

Altica woodsi is a species of flea beetle in the family Chrysomelidae. It is found in North America. It feeds on Vitis riparia and Virginia creeper.
