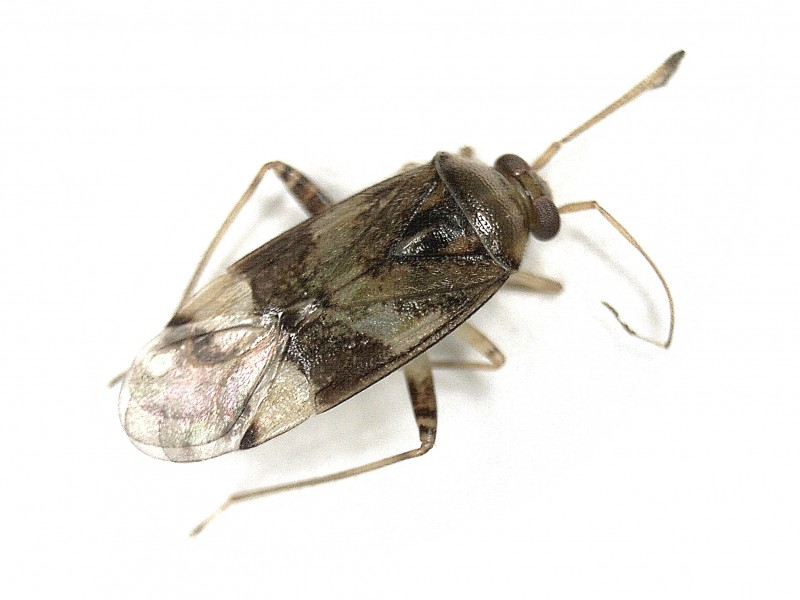
- Pinalitus cervinus Doorwerth, the Netherlands

Scientific classification
- Kingdom: Animalia
- Phylum: Arthropoda
- Class: Insecta
- Order: Hemiptera
- Suborder: Heteroptera
- Family: Miridae
- Genus: Pinalitus
- Species: P. cervinus

Binomial name
- Pinalitus cervinus (Herrich-Schäffer, 1841)

= Pinalitus cervinus =

Species of true bug

Pinalitus cervinus is a Palearctic species of true bug.
