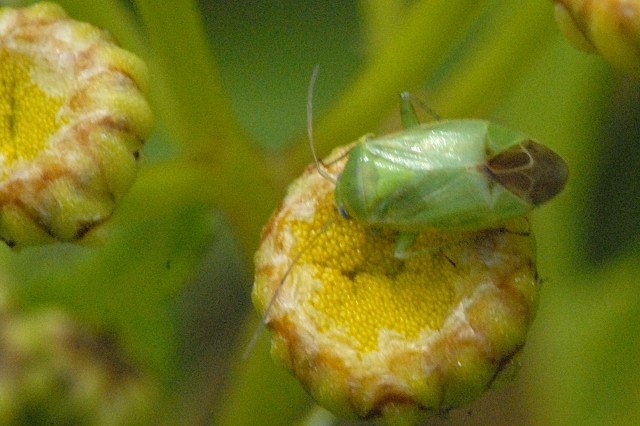
- Apolygus spinolae

Scientific classification
- Domain: Eukaryota
- Kingdom: Animalia
- Phylum: Arthropoda
- Class: Insecta
- Order: Hemiptera
- Suborder: Heteroptera
- Family: Miridae
- Subfamily: Mirinae
- Tribe: Mirini
- Genus: Apolygus; China, 1941

= Apolygus =

Genus of true bugs

Apolygus is a genus of true bugs belonging to the family Miridae.

The genus was first described by China in 1941.

The species of this genus are found in Eurasia.

Species:

- Apolygus limbatus
- Apolygus lucorum
- Apolygus rhamnicola
- Apolygus spinolae
