= Altica litigata =

Scientific classification
- Kingdom: Animalia
- Phylum: Arthropoda
- Class: Insecta
- Order: Coleoptera
- Suborder: Polyphaga
- Infraorder: Cucujiformia
- Family: Chrysomelidae
- Genus: Altica
- Species: A. litigata

Binomial name
- Altica litigata Fall, 1910

Species of beetle

Altica litigata, known generally as crepe myrtle flea beetle, is a species of flea beetle in the family Chrysomelidae. Other common names include the evening primrose flea beetle and primrose willow flea beetle. It is found in Central America and North America.
