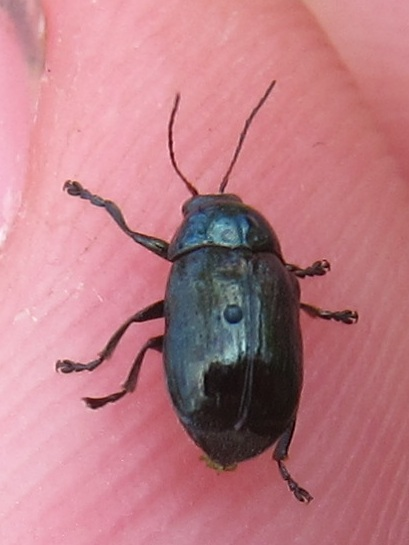

Scientific classification
- Kingdom: Animalia
- Phylum: Arthropoda
- Clade: Pancrustacea
- Class: Insecta
- Order: Coleoptera
- Suborder: Polyphaga
- Infraorder: Cucujiformia
- Family: Chrysomelidae
- Genus: Altica
- Species: A. aenescens

Binomial name
- Altica aenescens (Weise, 1888)

= Altica aenescens =

Species of beetle

Altica aenescens is a species of leaf beetle from the subfamily Galerucinae. It is distributed in Northern and Central Europe, as far south as northern Italy. Parts of Northern Europe include Belarus, Belgium, Finland, and Sweden. Recently reported from India.
