= Altica bicarinata =

Scientific classification
- Kingdom: Animalia
- Phylum: Arthropoda
- Class: Insecta
- Order: Coleoptera
- Suborder: Polyphaga
- Infraorder: Cucujiformia
- Family: Chrysomelidae
- Genus: Altica
- Species: A. bicarinata

Binomial name
- Altica bicarinata Kutschera, 1860

Species of beetle

Altica bicarinata is a species of leaf beetle from the subfamily Galerucinae. It can be found in Greece, Israel, Lebanon, Syria, Iraq, on Cyprus, in the north of Egypt and Saudi Arabia.
