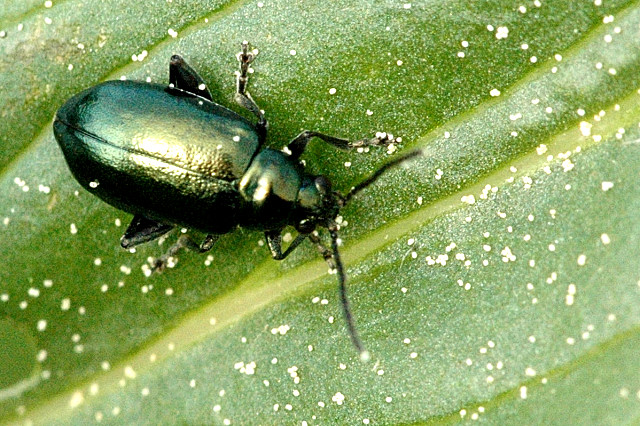

Scientific classification
- Kingdom: Animalia
- Phylum: Arthropoda
- Class: Insecta
- Order: Coleoptera
- Suborder: Polyphaga
- Infraorder: Cucujiformia
- Family: Chrysomelidae
- Genus: Altica
- Species: A. lythri

Binomial name
- Altica lythri Aubé, 1843

= Altica lythri =

Fuchsia flea beetle

Species of beetle

Altica lythri is a species of flea beetle from the leaf beetle family, that is common in Asia, Europe, and North Africa, including Israel. The beetles size is 5 mm (0.20 in), and their colour is blue with black and green. They present an ovipositor during oviposition. The species is distributed in European countries such as Finland and Ukraine, to the Asian countries of Azerbaijan, Dagestan, and Turkey. The species hibernate in winter, and come aground during summer months, when they are hungry. They feed on leaves of willowherb, water primroses and sallows. The species could become victims of such predators as Braconidae, Ichneumonidae, and adults of Pentatomidae, especially Zicrona caerulea.
