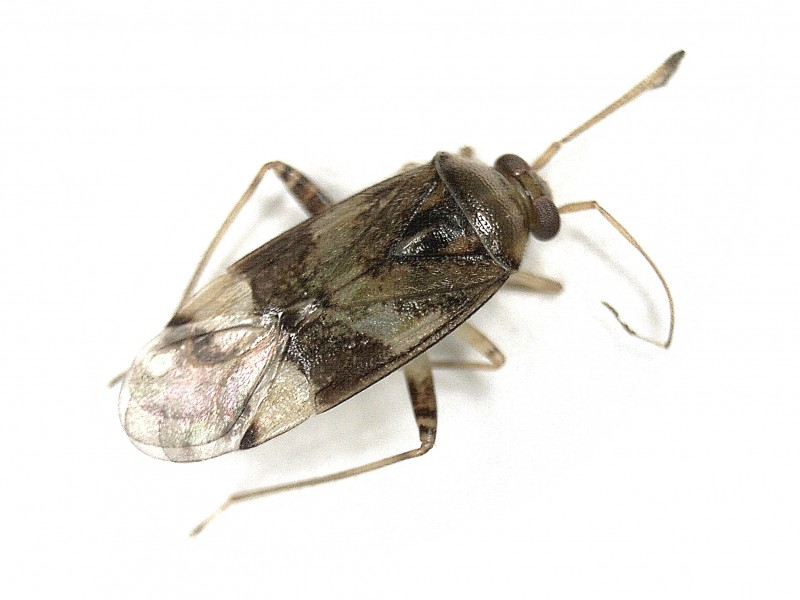
- Pinalitus cervinus Doorwerth, the Netherlands

Scientific classification
- Kingdom: Animalia
- Phylum: Arthropoda
- Class: Insecta
- Order: Hemiptera
- Suborder: Heteroptera
- Family: Miridae
- Subfamily: Mirinae
- Tribe: Mirini
- Genus: Pinalitus; Kelton, 1955

= Pinalitus =

Genus of true bugs

Pinalitus is a genus of plant bugs in the family Miridae.

== Species ==
Species:

- Pinalitus abietis Lu & Zheng, 2002
- Pinalitus alpinus Lu & Zheng, 2002
- Pinalitus approximatus (Stal, 1858)
- Pinalitus armandicola Lu & Zheng, 2002
- Pinalitus atomarius (Meyer-Dur, 1843)
- Pinalitus brachycnemis (Reuter, 1885)
- Pinalitus cervinus (Herrich-Schaeffer, 1841)
- Pinalitus coccineus (Horvath, 1898)
- Pinalitus conspurcatus (Reuter, 1875)
- Pinalitus drahamensis (Wagner, 1967)
- Pinalitus insularis (Reuter, 1895)
- Pinalitus nigriceps Kerzhner, 1988
- Pinalitus oromii Ribes, 1992
- Pinalitus parvulus (Reuter, 1879)
- Pinalitus rostratus Kelton, 1977
- Pinalitus rubeolus (Kulik, 1965)
- Pinalitus rubricatus (Fallen, 1807)
- Pinalitus rubrotinctus Knight, 1968
- Pinalitus rufinervis (Reuter, 1879)
- Pinalitus solivagus (Van Duzee, 1921)
- Pinalitus taishanensis Lu & Zheng, 2002
- Pinalitus viscicola (Puton, 1888)
