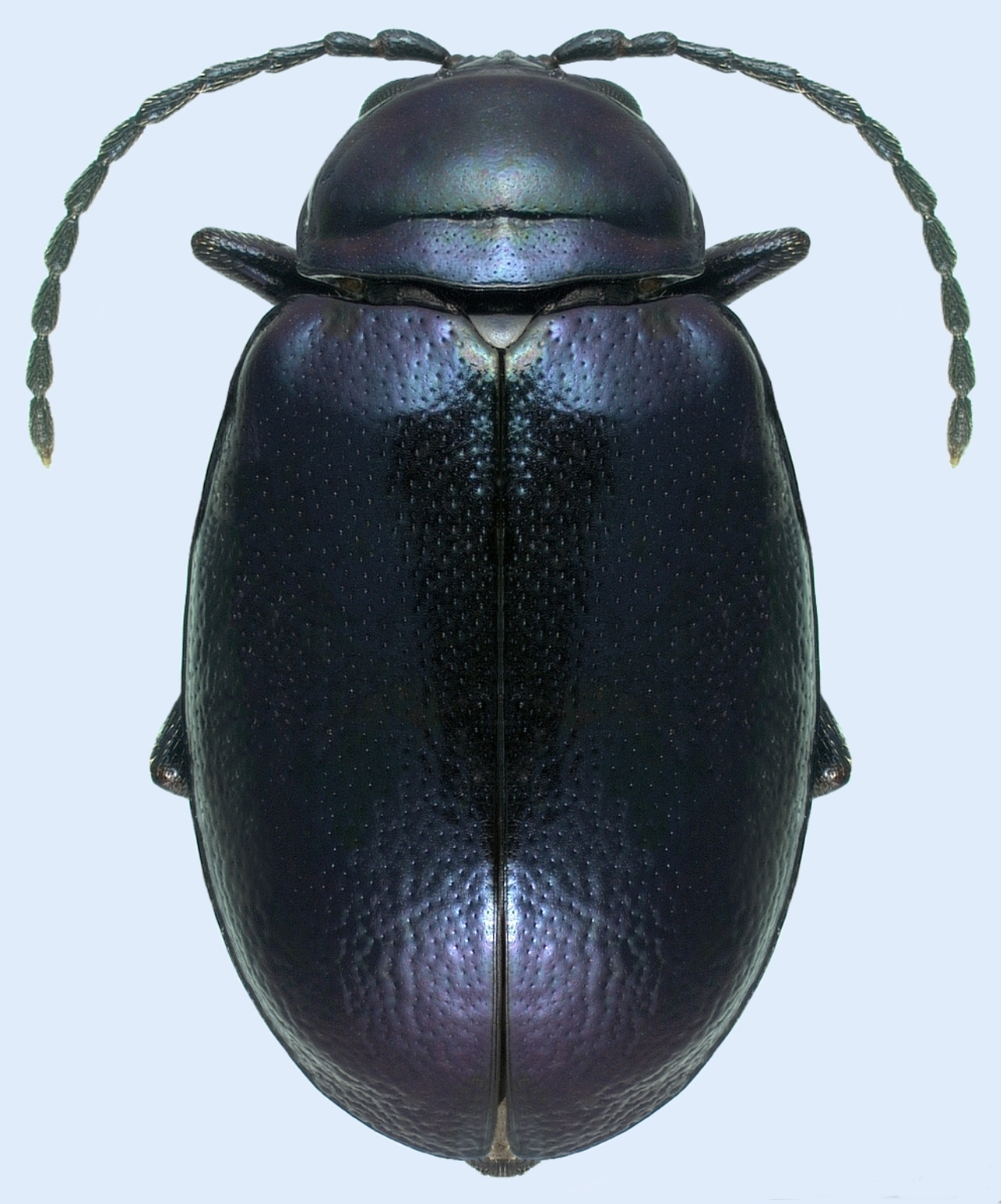

Conservation status
- Secure (NatureServe)

Scientific classification
- Kingdom: Animalia
- Phylum: Arthropoda
- Clade: Pancrustacea
- Class: Insecta
- Order: Coleoptera
- Suborder: Polyphaga
- Infraorder: Cucujiformia
- Family: Chrysomelidae
- Genus: Altica
- Species: A. chalybea

Binomial name
- Altica chalybea Illiger, 1807

= Altica chalybea =

Species of beetle

Altica chalybea (grape flea beetle) is a North American leaf beetle that consumes the buds of grape vines, reducing vegetative growth.

== Appearance ==
The grape flea beetle is a small bluish-green beetle. Like many Chrysomelids, it has a reflective appearance, hence its other name, the "grape steely beetle."

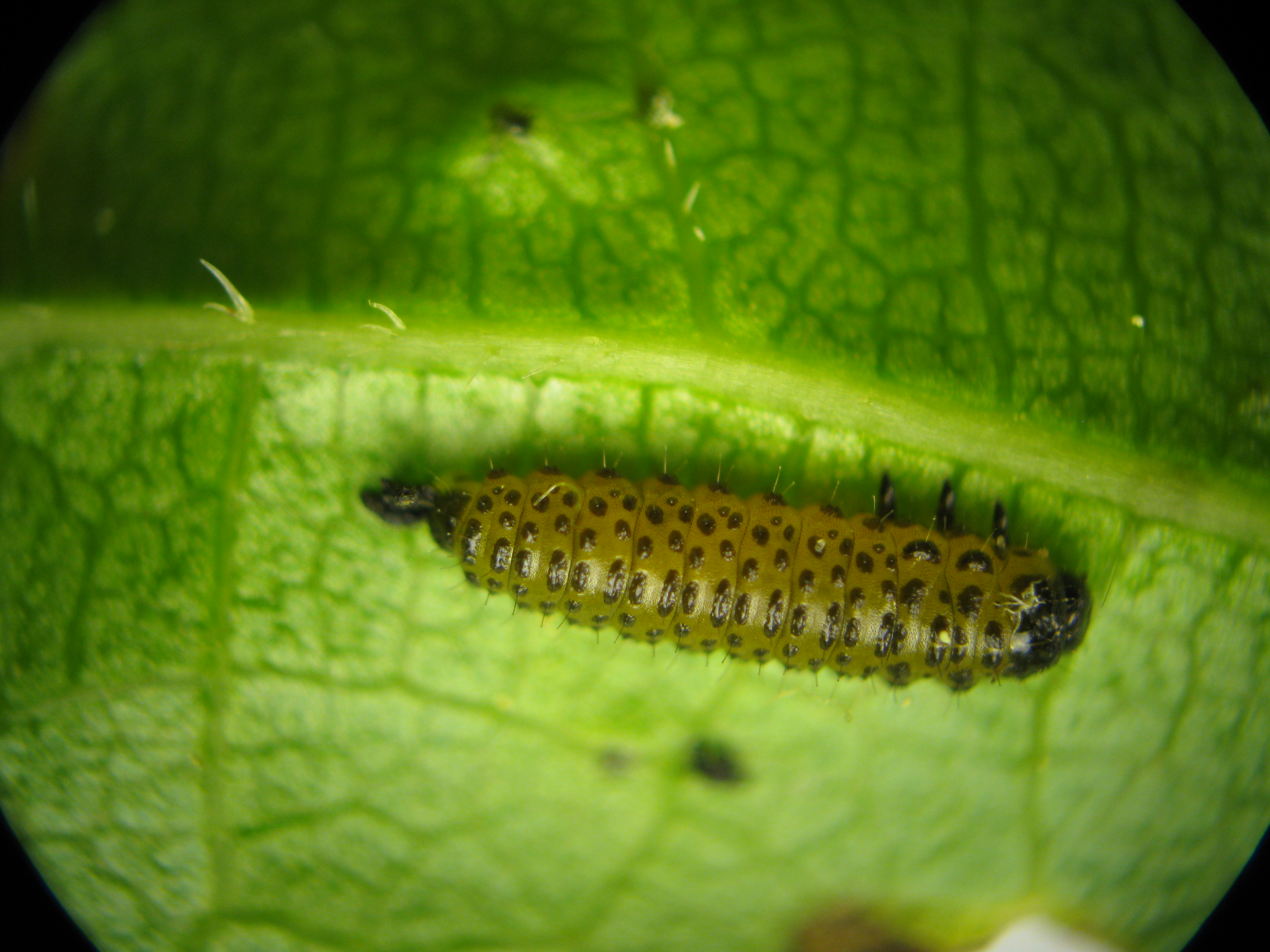
Altica sp. larva (likely A. chalybea)
