= Altica torquata =

Scientific classification
- Kingdom: Animalia
- Phylum: Arthropoda
- Class: Insecta
- Order: Coleoptera
- Suborder: Polyphaga
- Infraorder: Cucujiformia
- Family: Chrysomelidae
- Genus: Altica
- Species: A. torquata

Binomial name
- Altica torquata J. L. LeConte, 1858

Species of beetle

Altica torquata, the steel-blue grapevine flea beetle, is a species of flea beetle in the family Chrysomelidae. It is found in Central America, North America, and Oceania.
