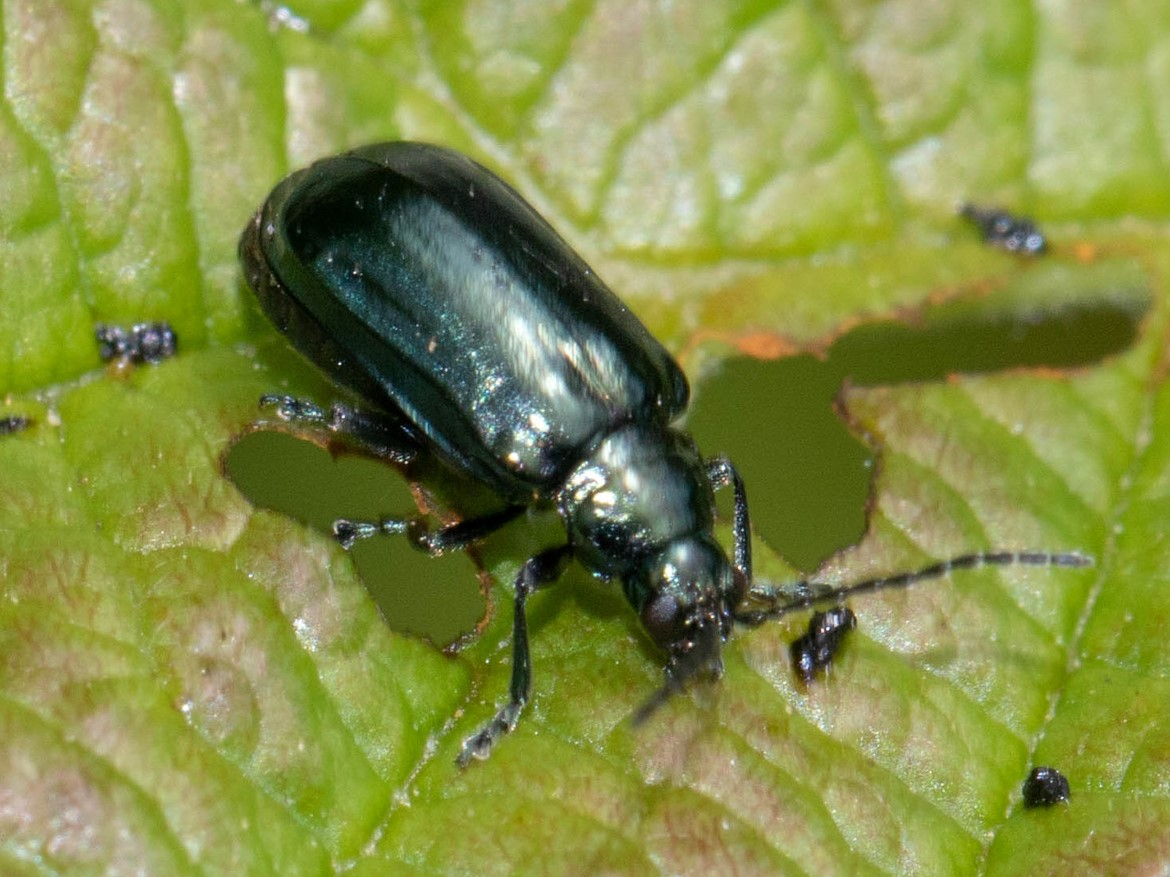

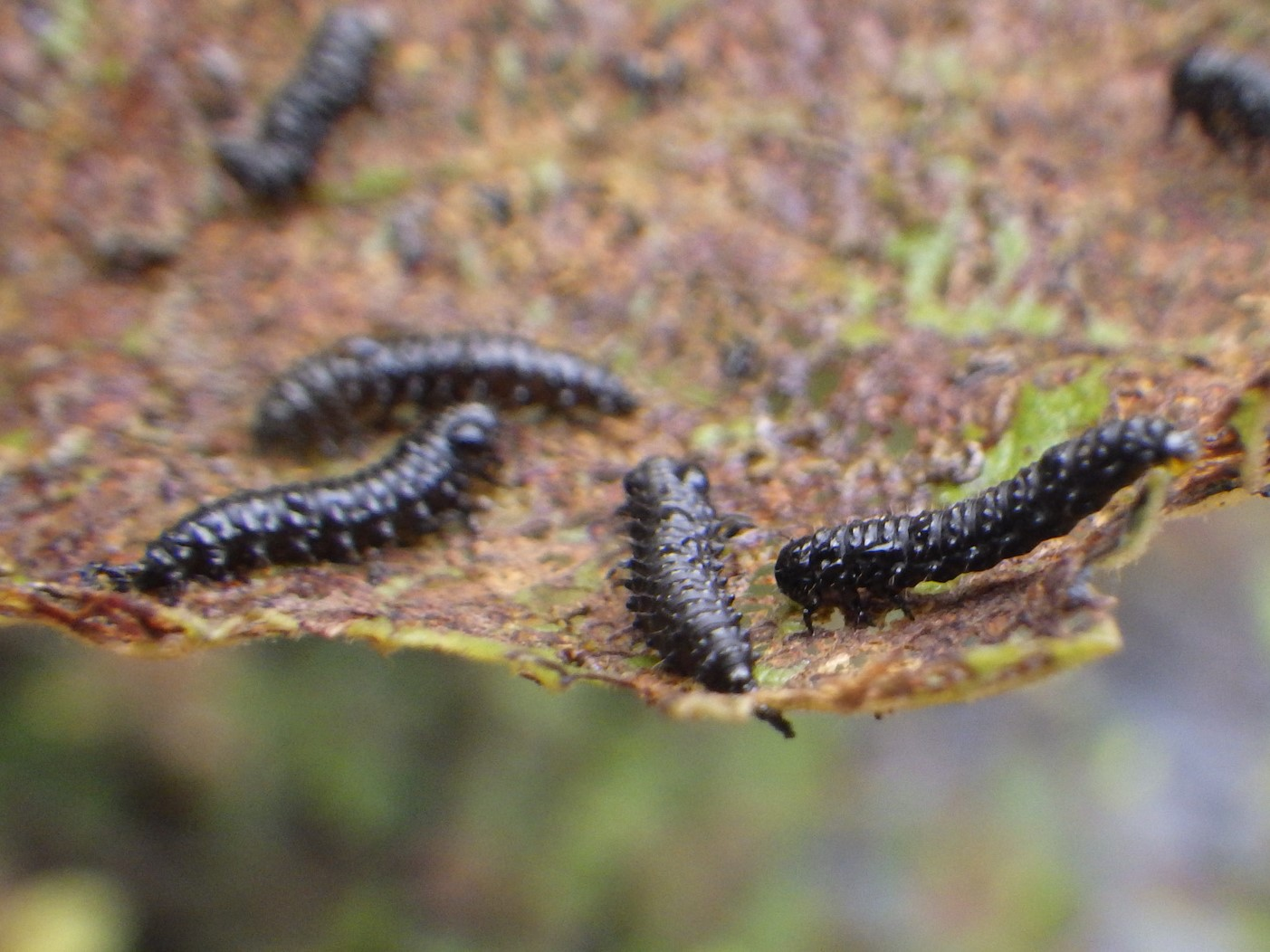
- Adult (top) and larvae (bottom)

Scientific classification
- Kingdom: Animalia
- Phylum: Arthropoda
- Clade: Pancrustacea
- Class: Insecta
- Order: Coleoptera
- Suborder: Polyphaga
- Infraorder: Cucujiformia
- Family: Chrysomelidae
- Genus: Altica
- Species: A. ambiens

Binomial name
- Altica ambiens J. L. LeConte, 1859

= Altica ambiens =

Species of beetle

Altica ambiens, the alder flea beetle, is a species of flea beetle in the family Chrysomelidae. It is found in North America.

== Subspecies ==
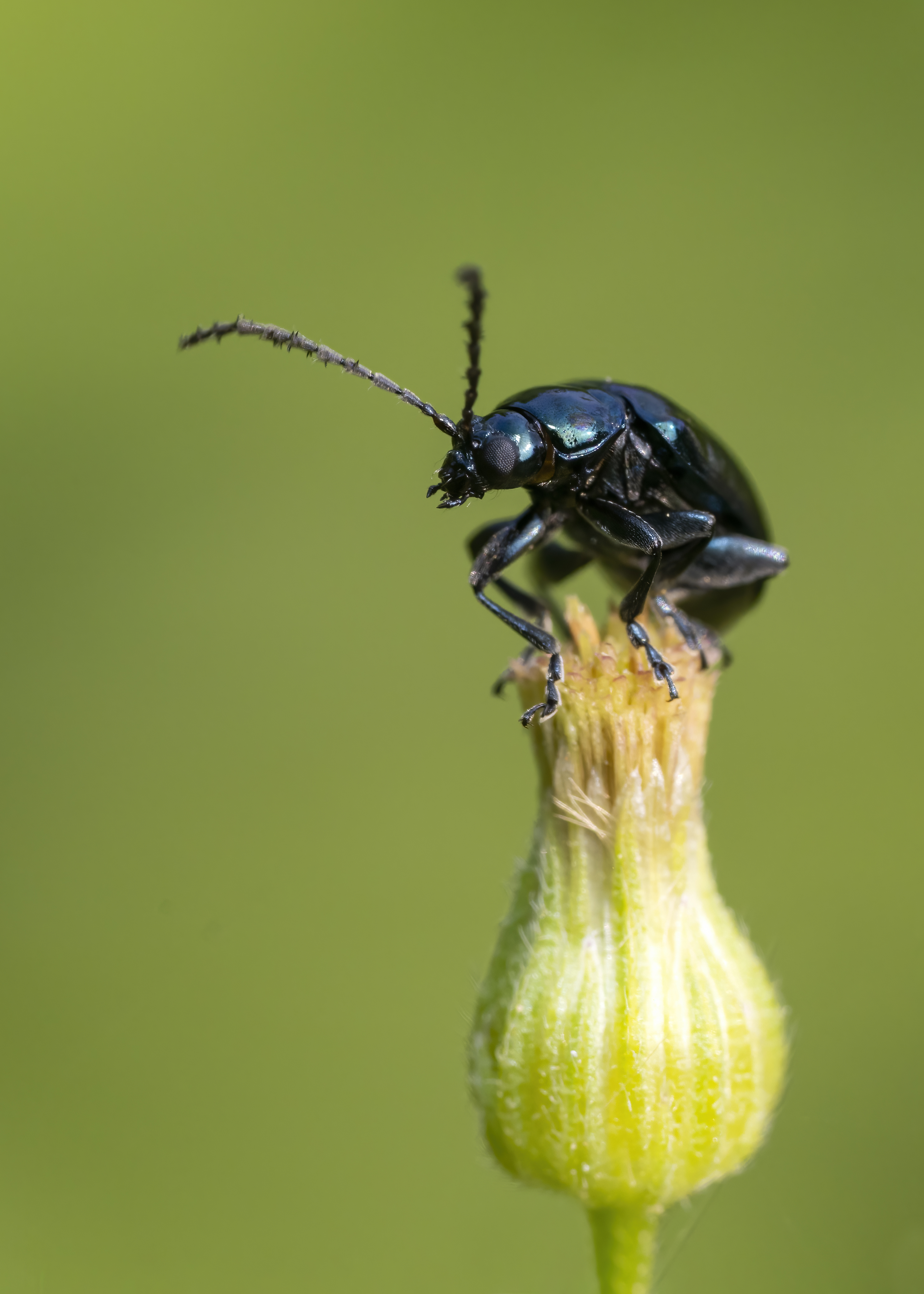
Alder flea beetle

- Altica ambiens alni Harris in Scudder, 1869
- Altica ambiens ambiens J. L. LeConte, 1859
