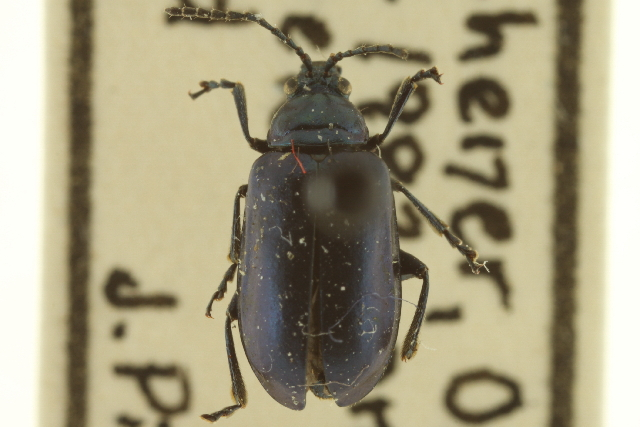

Scientific classification
- Kingdom: Animalia
- Phylum: Arthropoda
- Class: Insecta
- Order: Coleoptera
- Suborder: Polyphaga
- Infraorder: Cucujiformia
- Family: Chrysomelidae
- Genus: Altica
- Species: A. subplicata

Binomial name
- Altica subplicata LeConte, 1859

= Altica subplicata =

Species of beetle

Altica subplicata, the willow leaf beetle, is a species of flea beetle in the family Chrysomelidae. It ranges from southern Texas to southern Canada from British Columbia to Quebec. Its host plants are species in the genus Salix.
