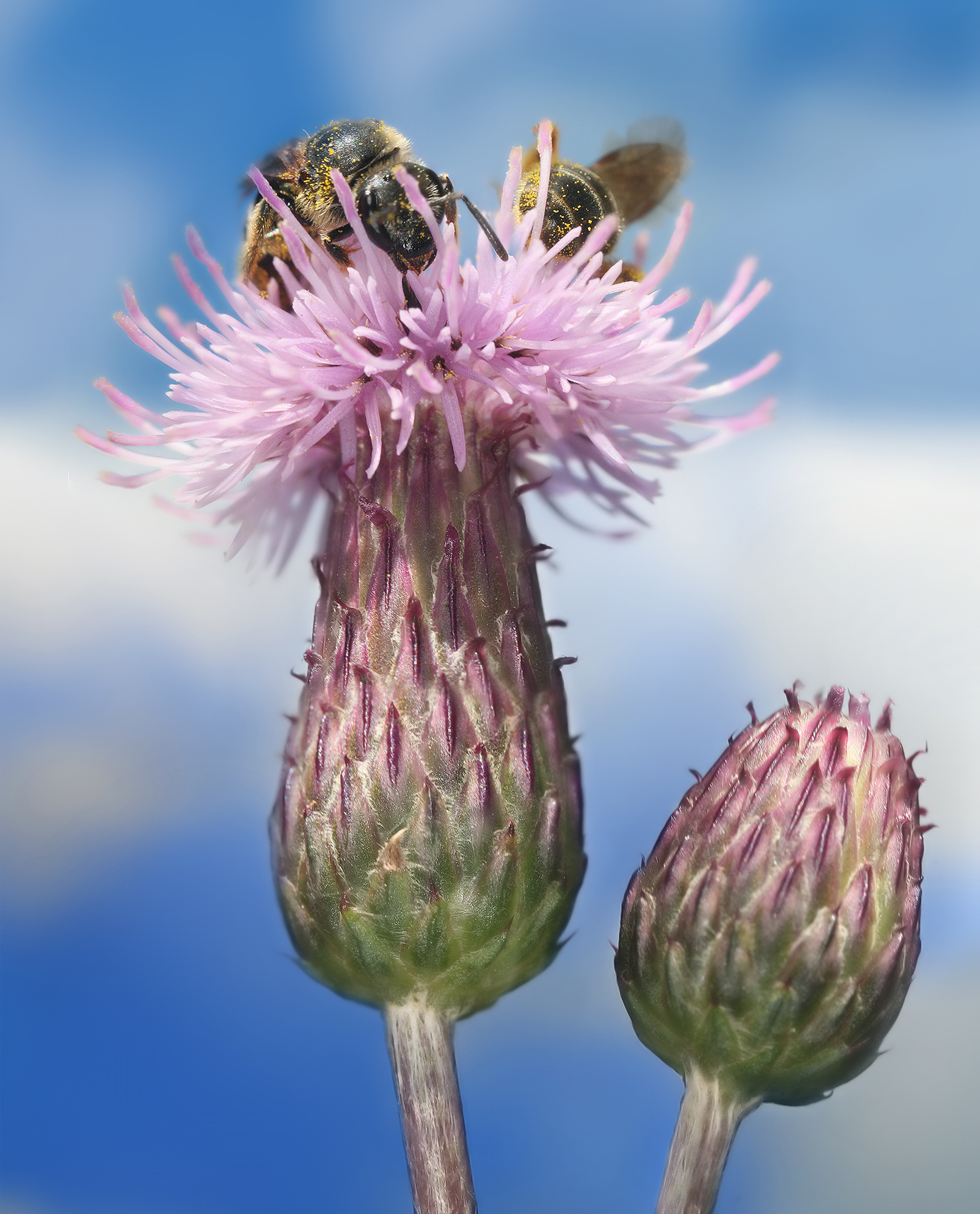

Conservation status
- Secure (NatureServe)

Scientific classification
- Kingdom: Plantae
- Clade: Tracheophytes
- Clade: Angiosperms
- Clade: Eudicots
- Clade: Asterids
- Order: Asterales
- Family: Asteraceae
- Genus: Cirsium
- Species: C. arvense

Binomial name
- Cirsium arvense (L.) Scop.

Synonyms
- Synonyms: Breea arvensis (L.) Less.; Carduus arvensis (L.) Robson; Cephalonoplos arvensis (L.) Fourr.; Cephalonoplos ochrolepidium (Juz.) Juz.; Cnicus arvensis (L.) Hoffm.; Serratula arvensis L.

= Cirsium arvense =

Species of flowering plant

Cirsium arvense is a perennial species of flowering plant in the family Asteraceae, native throughout Europe and western Asia, northern Africa and widely introduced elsewhere. The standard English name in its native area is creeping thistle. It is also commonly misnomered as Canada thistle and sometimes as field thistle.

== Alternative names ==
A number of other names are used in other areas or have been used in the past, including: Canadian thistle, lettuce from hell thistle, California thistle, corn thistle, cursed thistle, field thistle, green thistle, hard thistle, perennial thistle, prickly thistle, setose thistle, small-flowered thistle, way thistle, and stinger-needles. Canada and Canadian thistle are in wide use in the United States, despite being a misleading designation, since it is not of Canadian origin.

== Description ==
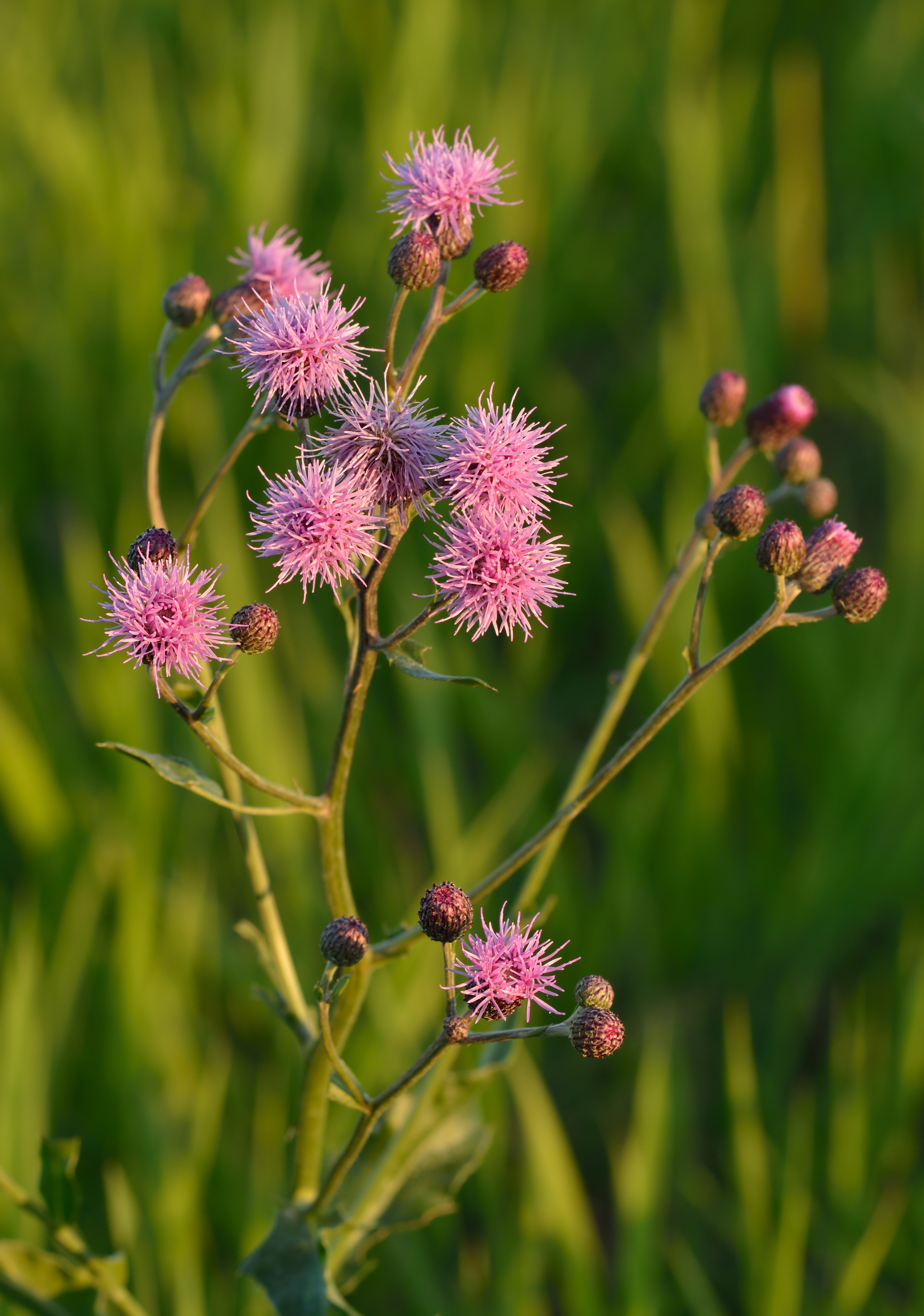
Flowering creeping thistle

Cirsium arvense is a C3 carbon fixation plant. The C3 plants originated during Mesozoic and Paleozoic eras, and tend to thrive in areas where sunlight intensity is moderate, temperatures are moderate, and ground water is plentiful. C_{3} plants lose 97% of the water taken up through their roots to transpiration.

Creeping thistle is a herbaceous perennial plant growing up to 150 cm, forming extensive clonal colonies from thickened roots that send up numerous erect shoots during the growing season. It is a ruderal species.

Given its adaptive nature, Cirsium arvense is one of the worst invasive weeds worldwide. Through comparison of its genetic expressions, the plant evolves differently with respect to where it has established itself. Differences can be seen in their R-protein mediated defenses, sensitivities to abiotic stresses, and developmental timing.

=== Taxonomy ===
Cirsium arvense is placed in the subtribe Carduinae, tribe Cardueae of the family Asteraceae. Unlike other species in the same genus, it is dioecious, although male plants sometimes produce bisexual flowers. It also differs from other native North American species in having large roots and multiple small flower heads on a branched stem. Cirsium arvense grows in diverse habitats (ranging from moist places to grasslands, mountain slopes, flooded lands, disturbed sites, etc.) at 100–4,300 m. Its native range is Temperate Eurasia, Northwest Africa. It has been introduced into North America, South America, Africa, Europe, Asia, Australia, and other regions.

=== Underground network ===
Its underground structure consists of four types, 1) long, thick, horizontal roots, 2) long, thick, vertical roots, 3) short, fine shoots, and 4) vertical, underground stems. Though asserted in some literature, creeping thistle does not form rhizomes. Root buds form adventitiously on the thickened roots of creeping thistle, and give rise to new shoots. Shoots can also arise from the lateral buds on the underground portion of regular shoots, particularly if the shoots are cut off through mowing or when stem segments are buried.

=== Shoots and leaves ===
Stems are 30–150 cm, slender green, and freely branched, smooth and glabrous (having no trichomes or glaucousness), mostly without spiny wings. Leaves are alternate on the stem with their base sessile and clasping or shortly decurrent. The leaves are very spiny, lobed, and up to 15–20 cm long and 2–3 cm broad (smaller on the upper part of the flower stem).

=== Flower head fragrance ===
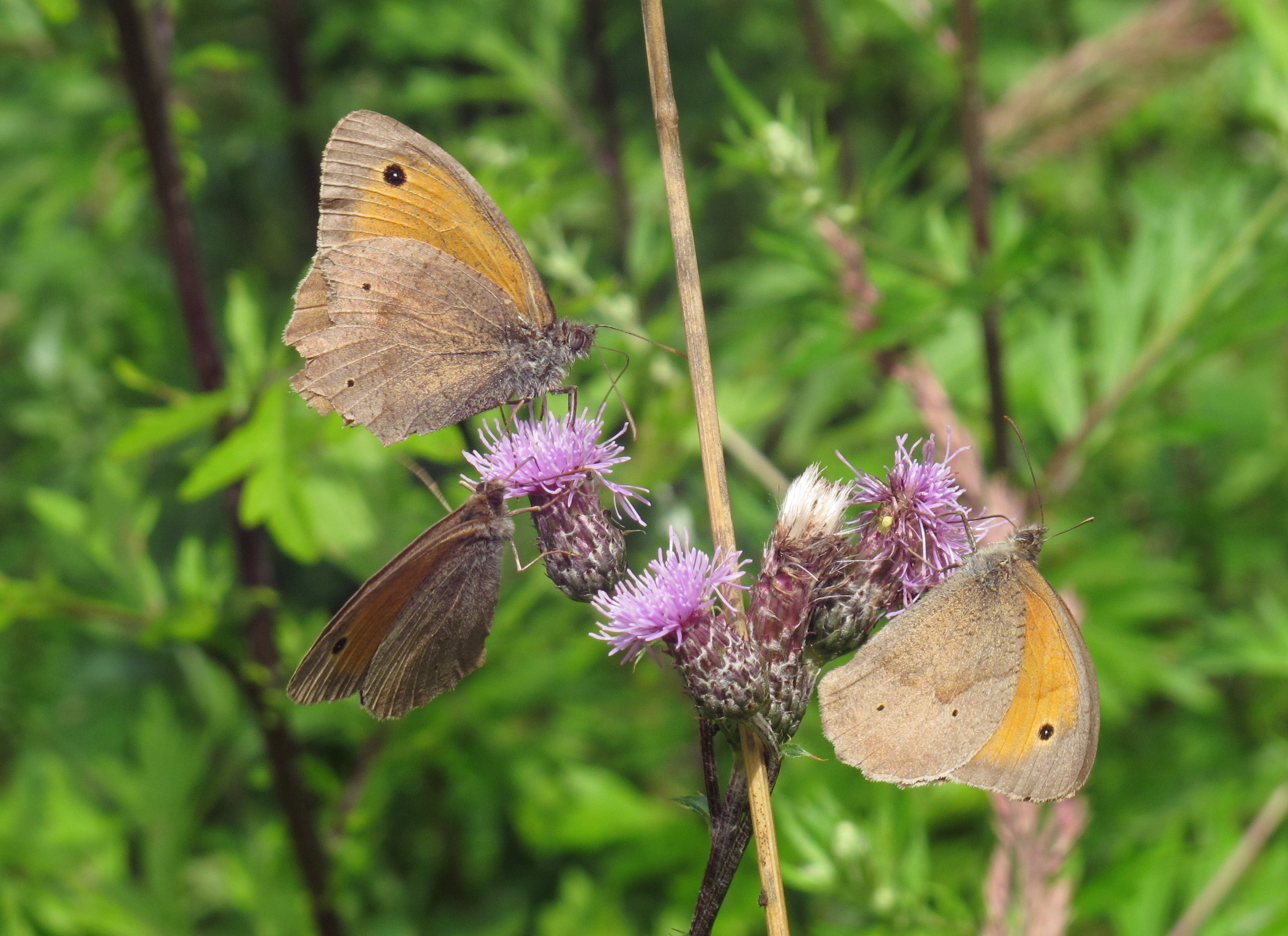
Meadow brown on creeping thistle

Every plant species has a unique floral fragrance. The fragrance that C. arvense emits attracts both pollinators and florivores containing compounds that attract each respectively. Honeybees are shown to have the highest visitation rate, followed by other bee species in the genera Halictus and Lasioglossum. Hover flies are also commonly seen pollinating the flower heads of this plant. Florivores such as beetles and grasshoppers are commonly seen as well. The compounds found in the fragrance may not be in the highest abundance but they are highly attractive. P-anisaldehyde is found in less than 1%, yet it attracts pollinators such as honey bees. This is thought to be the result of additive and synergistic effects from the blend increasing the attraction to the plant. After pollination, it can be seen that fragrance emission decreases in C.arvense. This is regulated through a regulatory feedback mechanism depending on the pollination status of the plant. This mechanism has only been observed in pistillate plants for dioecious C. arvense. Fragrance emission increases with age.

The fragrance contains several compounds that attract diverse insects. Looking at certain butterflies species, it can be seen that the fragrance blend is highly attractive to them, being sensitive to their antennae. High antennal response are seen in consequence to the phenylacetaldehyde as well as the terpenes (oxoisophoroneoxide, oxoisophorone, and dihydrooxoisophorone) found in the blend. This was seen in both natural plants emitting the fragrance and emitting the scent synthetically. It is believed that general arousal can be stimulated through exposure of a single compound, whereas the accumulated exposure of all the compounds influence the foraging behaviour of the butterflies.

=== Flowers and seeds ===
The inflorescence compound cyme is 10–22 mm (0.39–0.87 in) in diameter, pink-purple, with all the florets of similar form (no division into disc and ray florets). The flowers are usually dioecious, but not invariably so, with some plants bearing hermaphrodite flowers. The seeds are 4–5 mm long, with a feathery pappus which assists in wind dispersal. One to 5 flower heads occur per branch, with plants in very favourable conditions producing up to 100 heads per shoot. Each head contains an average of 100 florets. Average seed production per plant has been estimated at 1530. More seeds are produced when male and female plants are closer together, as flowers are primarily insect-pollinated. The plant can bloom from seed in a year then subsequently the seeds produced can emerge in the following year.

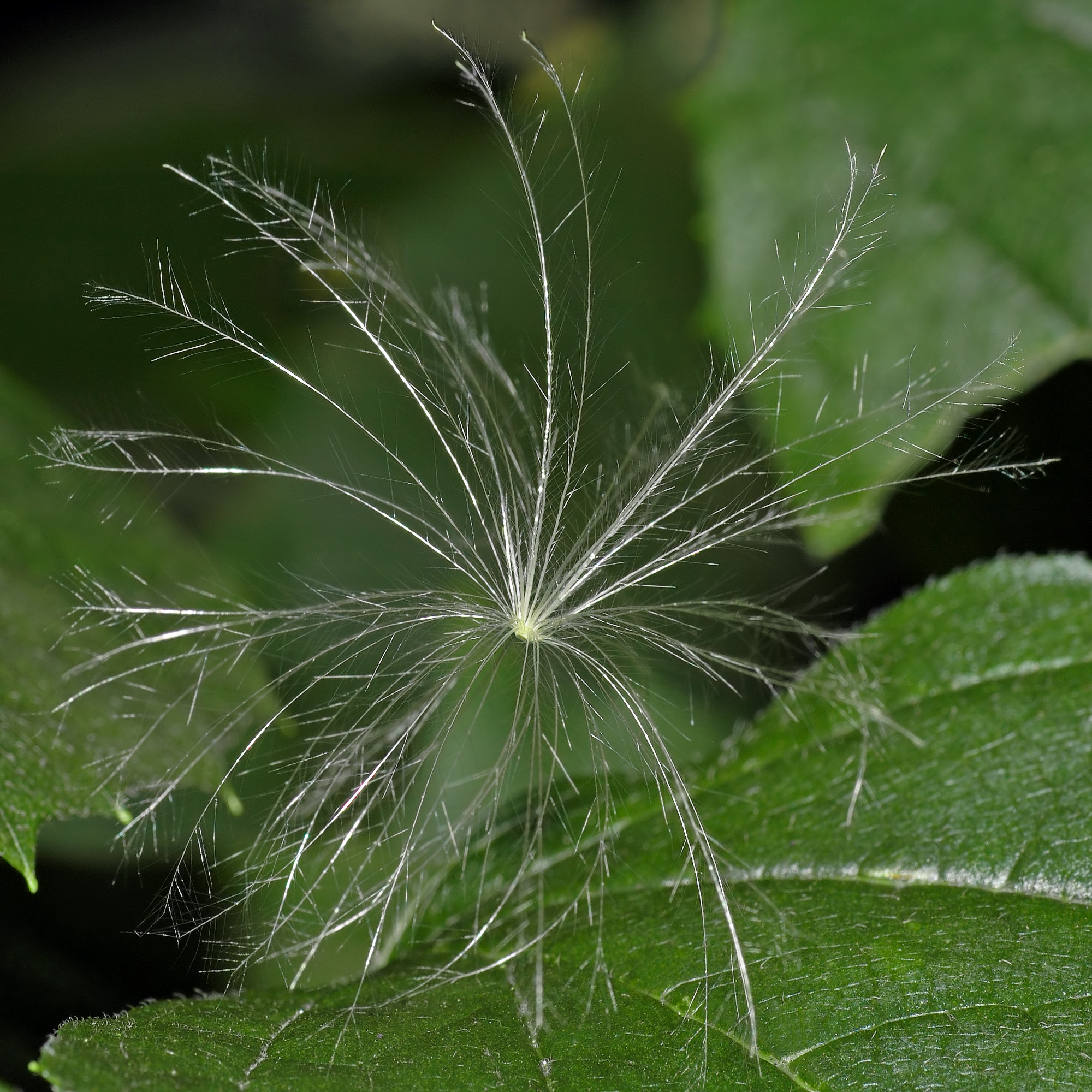
Pappus of Cirsium arvense

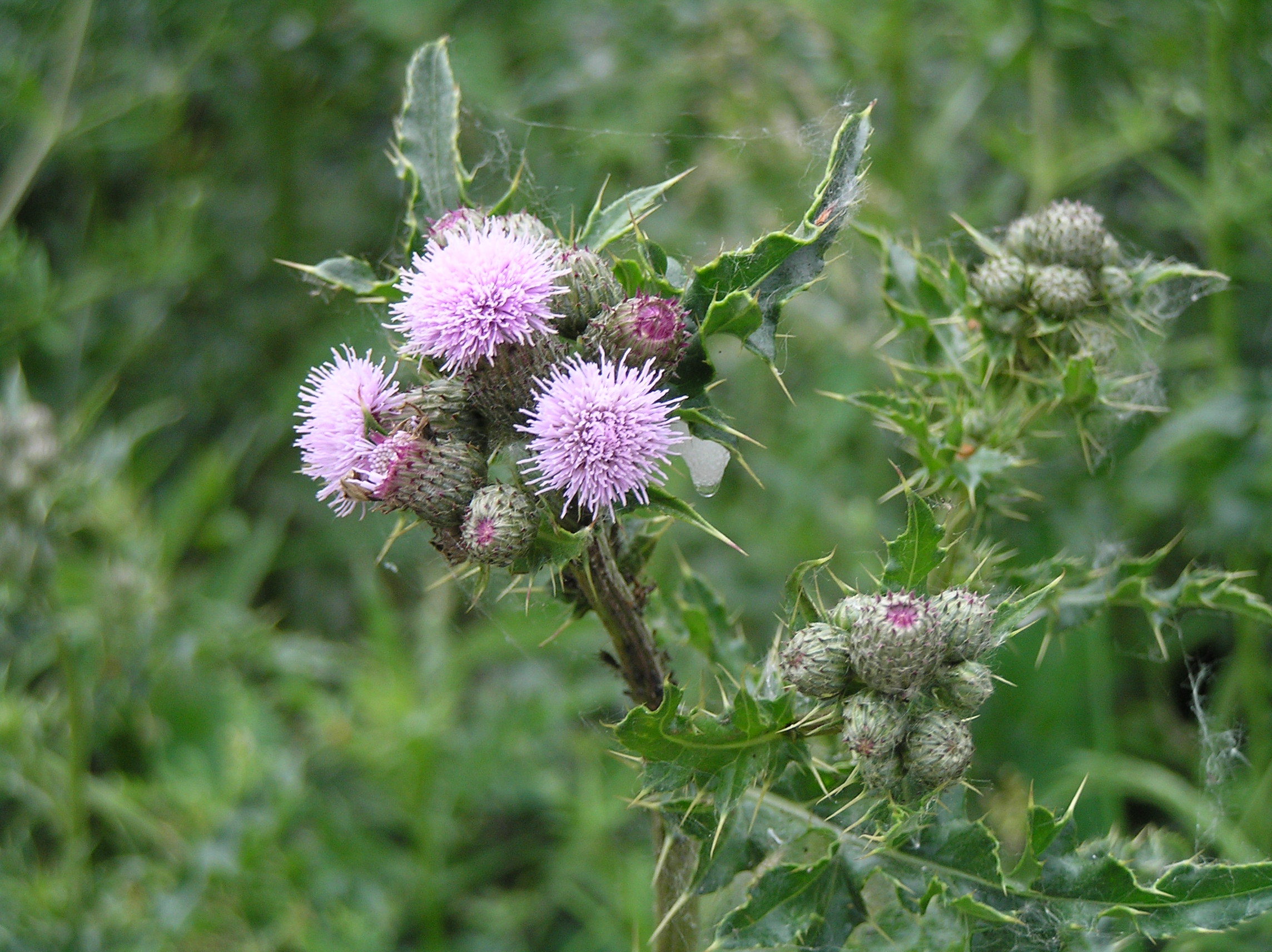
A creeping thistle with a "cuckoo spit"

== Varieties ==
Variation in leaf characters (texture, vestiture, segmentation, spininess) is the basis for determining creeping thistle varieties. According to Flora of Northwest Europe the two varieties are:

- Cirsium arvense var. arvense. Most of Europe. Leaves hairless or thinly hairy beneath.
- Cirsium arvense var. incanum (Fisch.) Ledeb. Southern Europe. Leaves thickly hairy beneath.

The Biology of Canadian Weeds: Cirsium arvense list four varieties:

- Cirsium arvense var. vestitum (Wimm. & Grab). Leaves gray-tomentose below.
- Cirsium arvense var. integrifolium (Wimm. & Grab). Leaves all entire or the upper leaves entire and the lower stem leaves shallowly and regularly pinnatifid or undulating.
- Cirsium arvense var. arvense. Leaves shallowly to deeply pinnatifid, often asymmetrical.
- Cirsium arvense var. horridum (Wimm. & Grab). Leaves thick, subcoriaceous, surface wavy, marginal spines long and stout.

== Ecology ==
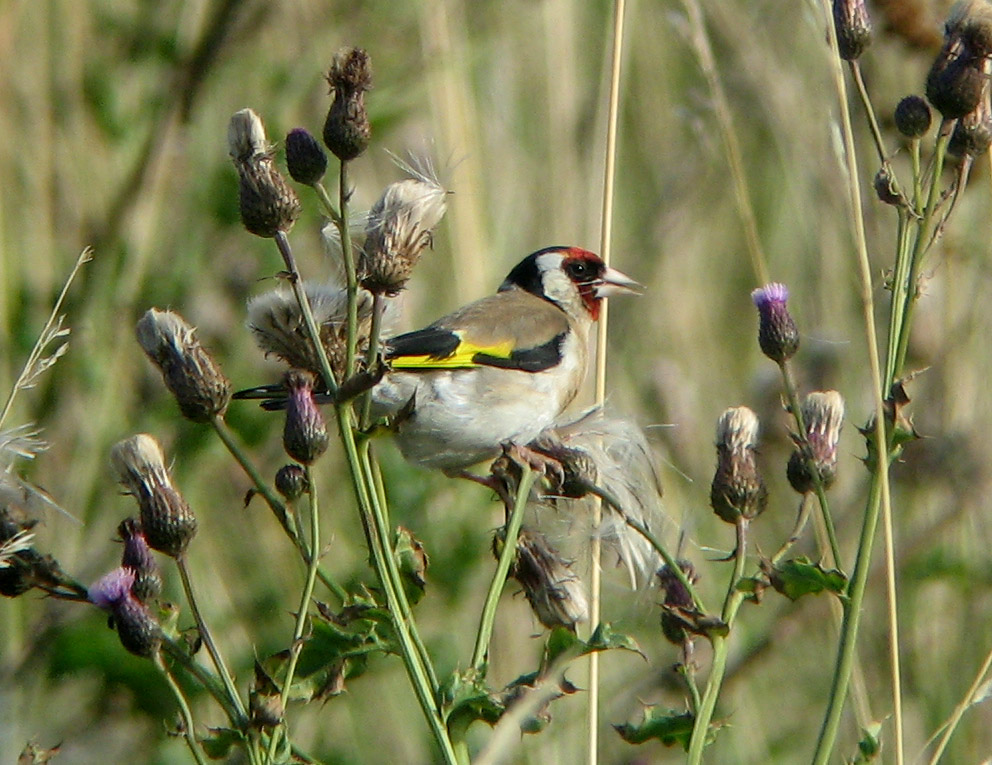
A European goldfinch (Carduelis carduelis) feeding on the seeds

The seeds are an important food for the goldfinch and the linnet, and to a lesser extent for other finches. Creeping thistle foliage is used as a food by over 20 species of Lepidoptera, including the painted lady butterfly and the engrailed moth, and several species of aphids. The C. arvense species is also noted to be a food source for the Altica cirsicola beetle species.

The flowers are visited by a wide variety of insects such as bees, moths, wasps and beetles (the generalised pollination syndrome). The plant is beneficial for pollinators that rely on nectar. It also was a top producer of nectar sugar in a 2016 study in Britain, with a second-place ranking due to a production per floral unit of (2609±239 μg).

== Status as a weed ==
The species is widely considered a weed even where it is native, for example being designated an "injurious weed" in the United Kingdom under the Weeds Act 1959. It is also a serious invasive species in many additional regions where it has been introduced, usually accidentally as a contaminant in cereal crop seeds. It is cited as a noxious weed in several countries; for example Australia, Brazil, Canada, Ireland, New Zealand, and the United States. Many countries regulate this plant, or its parts (i.e., seed) as a contaminant of other imported products such as grains for consumption or seeds for propagation. In Canada, C. arvense is classified as a primary noxious weed seed in the Weed Seeds Order 2005 which applies to Canada's Seeds Regulations.

A study conducted has shown that with future global atmospheric carbon levels, C. arvense have a risk of increased growth which could expand its range and outcompete native species.

== Control ==
=== Organic ===
Control methods include cutting at flower stem extension before the flower buds open to prevent seed spread. Repeated cutting at the same growth stage over several years may "wear down" the plant.

Growing forages such as alfalfa can help control the species as a weed: by frequently cutting the alfalfa to add nutrients to the soil, the weeds also get cut and have a harder time re-establishing themselves, which reduces the shoot density.

Orellia ruficauda feeds on Canada thistle and has been reported to be the most effective biological control agent for that plant. Its larvae parasitize the seed heads, feeding solely upon fertile seed heads.

The weevil Larinus planus also feeds on the thistle and has been used as a control agent in Canada. One larva of the species can consume up to 95% of seeds in a particular flower bud. However, use of this weevil has had a damaging effect on other thistle species as well, include some that are threatened. It may therefore not be a desirable control agent. It is unclear if the government continues to use this weevil to control Canada thistles or not.

The rust species Puccinia obtegens has shown some promise for controlling Canada thistle, but it must be used in conjunction with other control measures to be effective. Also Puccinia punctiformis is used in North America and New Zealand in biological control. In 2013, in four countries in three continents, epidemics of systemic disease caused by this rust fungus could be routinely and easily established. The procedure for establishing this control agent involves three simple steps and is a long-term sustainable control solution that is free and does not involve herbicides. Plants systemically diseased with the rust gradually but surely die. Reductions in thistle density were estimated, in 10 sites in the U.S., Greece, and Russia, to average 43%, 64%, and 81% by 18, 30, and 42 months, respectively, after a single application of spores of the fungus.

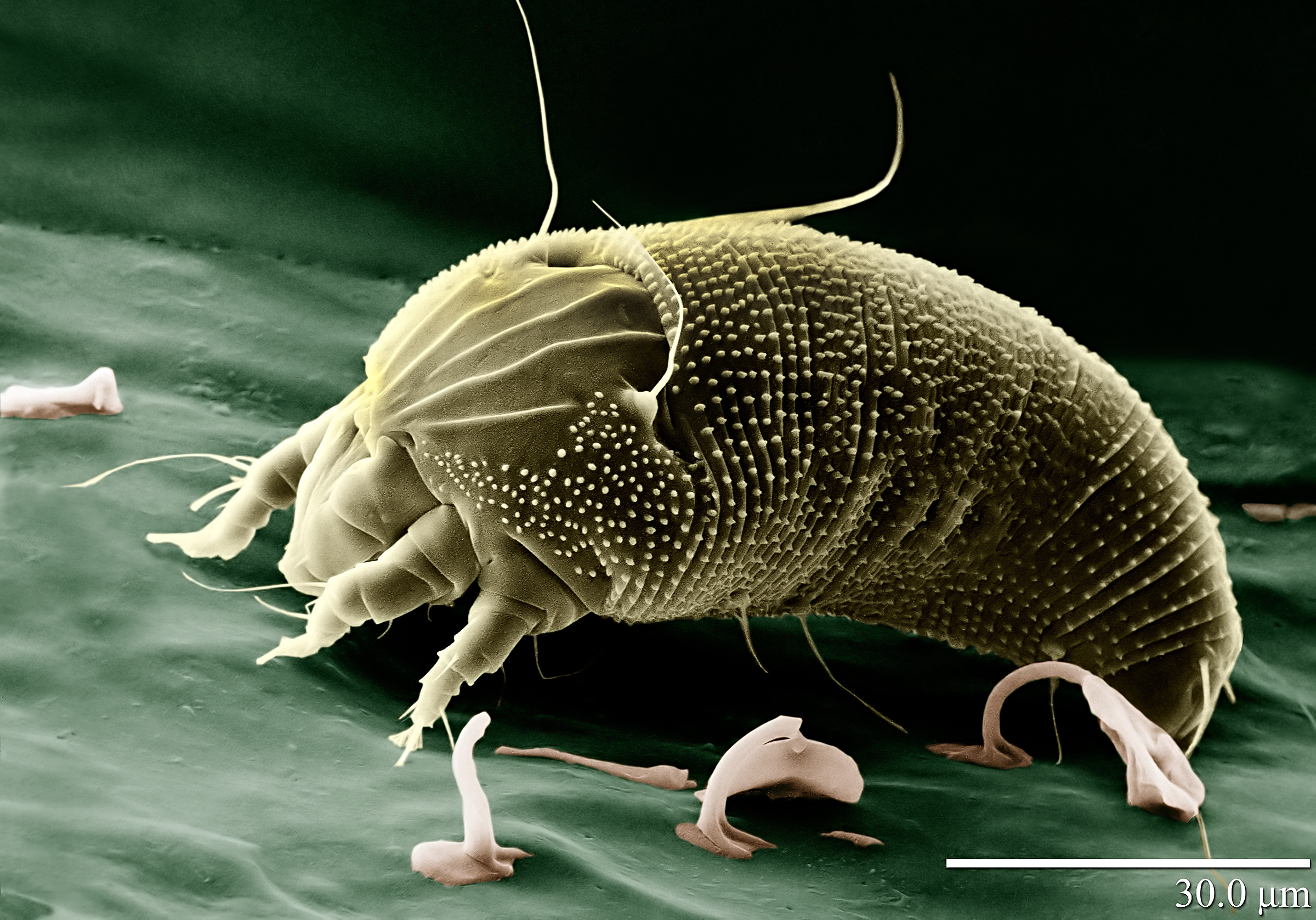
Electron scan micrography of Aceria anthocoptes

Aceria anthocoptes feeds on this species and is considered to be a good potential biological control agent.

=== Chemical ===
Applying herbicide: Herbicides dominated by phenoxy compounds (especially MCPA) caused drastic declines in thistle infestation in Sweden in the 1950s. MCPA and clopyralid are approved in some regions. Glyphosate is a non-selective herbicide that can be used when the plant has grown a few inches tall, where the herbicide can be absorbed by the leaf surfaces.

Crop tolerance and weed control ratings were conducted in the spring of 2012, and the Prepass herbicide by DOW AgroSciences was found to be most effective at controlling the species as a weed problem in alfalfa fields.

== Uses ==
Like other Cirsium species, the roots are edible, though rarely used, not in the least because of their propensity to induce flatulence in some people. The taproot is considered the most nutritious part. The leaves are also edible, though the spines make their preparation for food too tedious to be worthwhile. The stalks, however, are also edible and more easily despined. Bruichladdich distillery on Isle of Islay lists creeping thistle as one of the 22 botanical forages used in their gin, The Botanist.

The feathery pappus is also used by the Cherokee to fletch blowgun darts.
