= Ernest Allard =

French entomologist

Ernest (e) Allard (1820–1900) was a French entomologist who specialised in Coleoptera. He is not to be confused with the Belgian entomologist Vincent Allard (1921–1994).

Allard's collection was acquired by René Oberthür and is now held by Muséum national d'histoire naturelle, in Paris and Museum Koenig in Bonn. He was a Member of the Société entomologique de France.

== Works ==
- Allard, E. 1869. Révision du genre Asida Latreille. L'Abeille, Revue d'Entomologie 6: 159–305.
- Allard, E. 1876. Révision des hélopines vrais de Lacordaire, L'Abeille, Revue d'Entomologie 14: 1–80.
- Allard, E. (1889). "Description de quelques novelles espèces de Galerucides". Annales de la Société entomologique de Belgique (in French). 33: CII–CXVII.
