= Rudolf Ludwig Meyer-Dür =

Swiss entomologist (1812–1885)

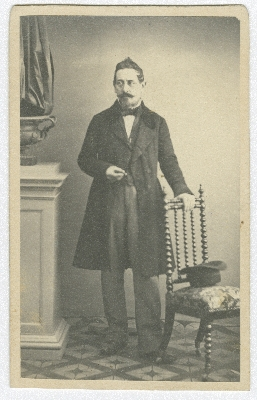
Rudolf Ludwig Meyer-Dur

Rudolf Ludwig Meyer-Dür ( August 12, 1812, Burgdorf – March 2, 1885, Zürich) was a Swiss entomologist who specialised in Hemiptera, Orthoptera and Neuroptera He was a founder Member of the Swiss Entomological Society (Société Entomologique Suisse).

For most of his life he lived in Burgdorf and he worked mainly on the Swiss insect fauna but in 1859 he accompanied Jules Pictet on a collecting trip to Spain. He also collected in the South of France.

Insect specimens collected by Meyer-Dür are variously disposed in the Museum of Comparative Zoology Cambridge Massachusetts, State Museum of Zoology, Dresden, Natural History Museum of Bern, University of Zurich Zoology Museum UZZM, American Museum of Natural History, New York.

== Works ==
Partial list

- Meyer-Dür, L. R., 1843 Verzeichnis der in der Schweiz einhimischen Rhynchoten (Hemiptera Linn.).Erstes Heft. Die Familie der Capsini. Jent und Gassmann, Solothurn. X + 11–116 + IV pp., 7 plates.
- Meyer-Dür, L. R., 1870 Hemipterologisches. Zwei neue Capsiden nebst Bemerkungen über die Gruppe der grunen Lygus Arten. Mitteilungen der Schweizerischen Entomologischen Gesellschaft 3: 206–210.
- Meyer-Dur, L. R. 1871. Die Psylloden. Mitteilungen der Schweizerischen Entomologischen Gesellschaft 3: 377–406.
