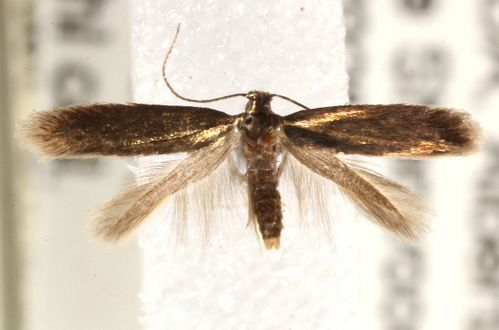

Scientific classification
- Kingdom: Animalia
- Phylum: Arthropoda
- Clade: Pancrustacea
- Class: Insecta
- Order: Lepidoptera
- Family: Tischeriidae
- Genus: Coptotriche
- Species: C. admirabilis

Binomial name
- Coptotriche admirabilis (Braun, 1925)

Synonyms
- Tischeria admirabilis Braun, 1925

= Coptotriche admirabilis =

Species of moth

Coptotriche admirabilis is a moth of the family Tischeriidae. It is found in North America, including Iowa and Ohio.

The larvae feed on Rosa carolina and Rosa palustris. They mine the leaves of their host plant.
