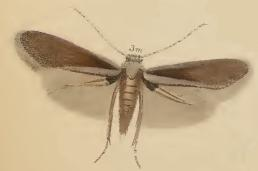

Scientific classification
- Domain: Eukaryota
- Kingdom: Animalia
- Phylum: Arthropoda
- Class: Insecta
- Order: Lepidoptera
- Family: Tischeriidae
- Genus: Coptotriche
- Species: C. angusticollella

Binomial name
- Coptotriche angusticollella Duponchel, 1843

Synonyms
- Tischeria angusticollella; Coptotriche angusticollella; Elachista angusticollella

= Emmetia angusticollella =

Species of moth

Emmetia angusticollella is a moth of the family Tischeriidae. It is found in most of Europe.

Mined rose leaflet

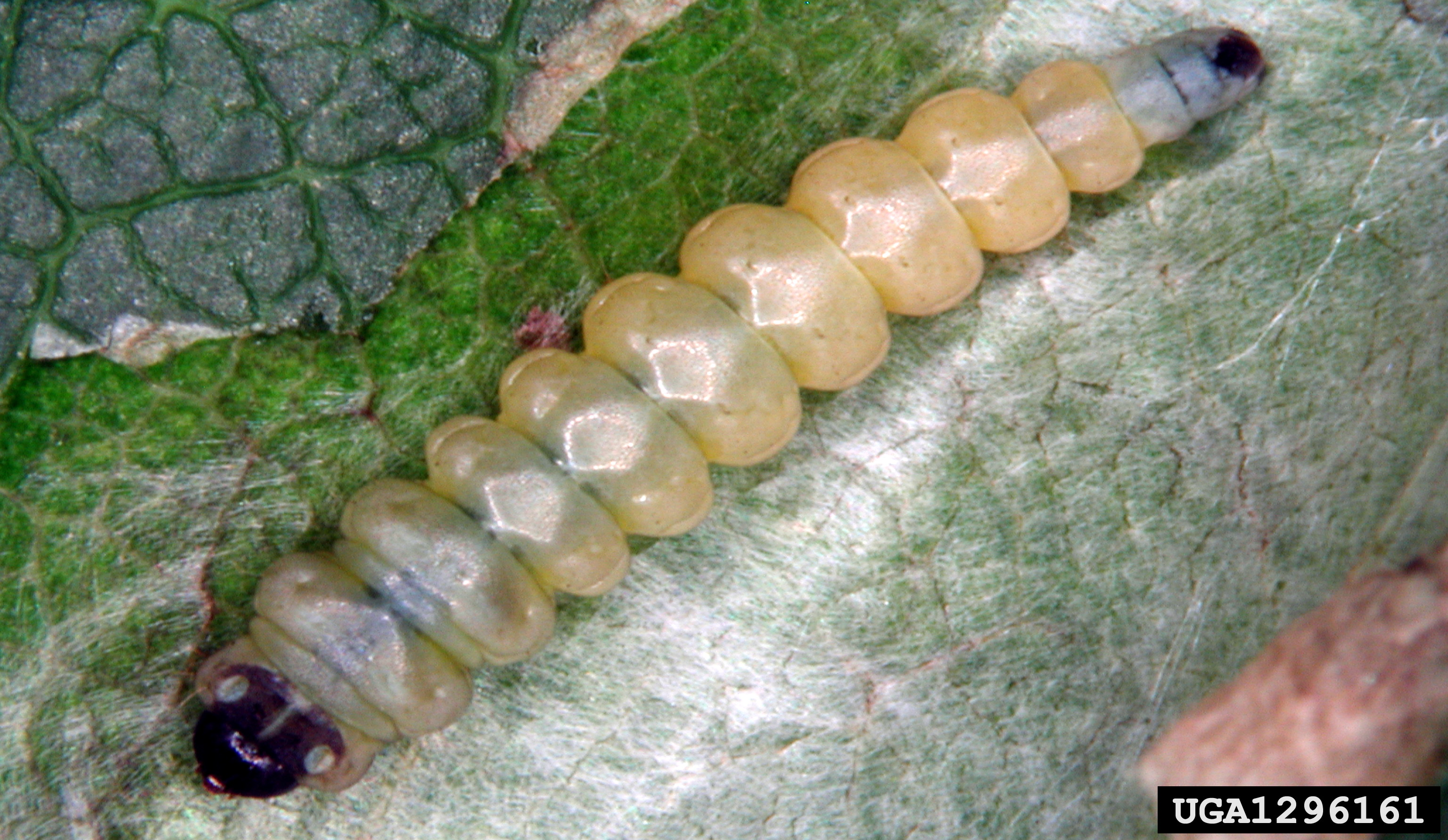
Larva

The larvae feed on Rosa species.
