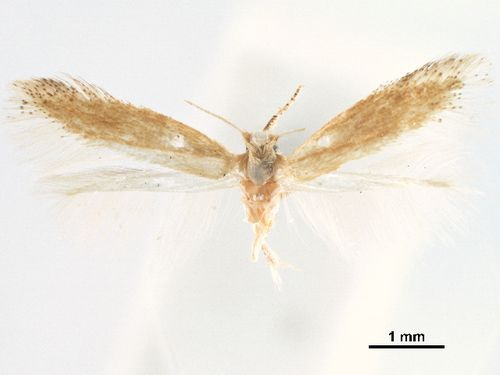

Scientific classification
- Kingdom: Animalia
- Phylum: Arthropoda
- Clade: Pancrustacea
- Class: Insecta
- Order: Lepidoptera
- Family: Tischeriidae
- Genus: Coptotriche
- Species: C. simulata

Binomial name
- Coptotriche simulata (Braun, 1972)

Synonyms
- Tischeria simulata Braun, 1972

= Coptotriche simulata =

Species of moth

Coptotriche simulata is a moth of the family Tischeriidae. It was described by Annette Frances Braun in 1972. It is found in the US states of Arkansas, Kentucky and Ohio.

The larvae feed on Quercus alba, Quercus montana and Quercus stellata. They mine the leaves of their host plant.
