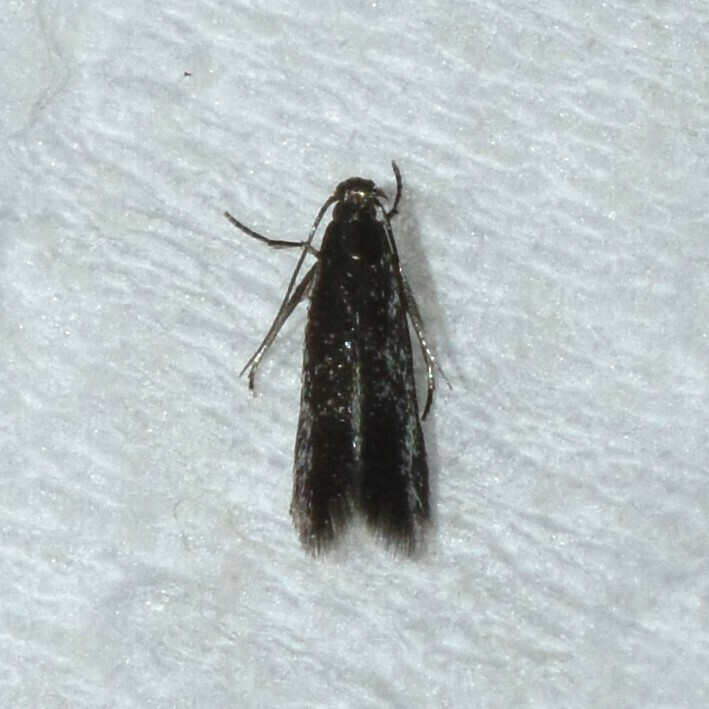

Scientific classification
- Kingdom: Animalia
- Phylum: Arthropoda
- Clade: Pancrustacea
- Class: Insecta
- Order: Lepidoptera
- Family: Tischeriidae
- Genus: Coptotriche
- Species: C. crataegifoliae

Binomial name
- Coptotriche crataegifoliae (Braun, 1972)

Synonyms
- Tischeria crataegifoliae Braun, 1972

= Coptotriche crataegifoliae =

Species of moth

Coptotriche crataegifoliae is a moth of the family Tischeriidae. It was described by Annette Frances Braun in 1972. It is found in North America in Ontario, Quebec, Ohio and Pennsylvania.

The larvae feed on Crataegus mollis. They mine the leaves of their host plant.
