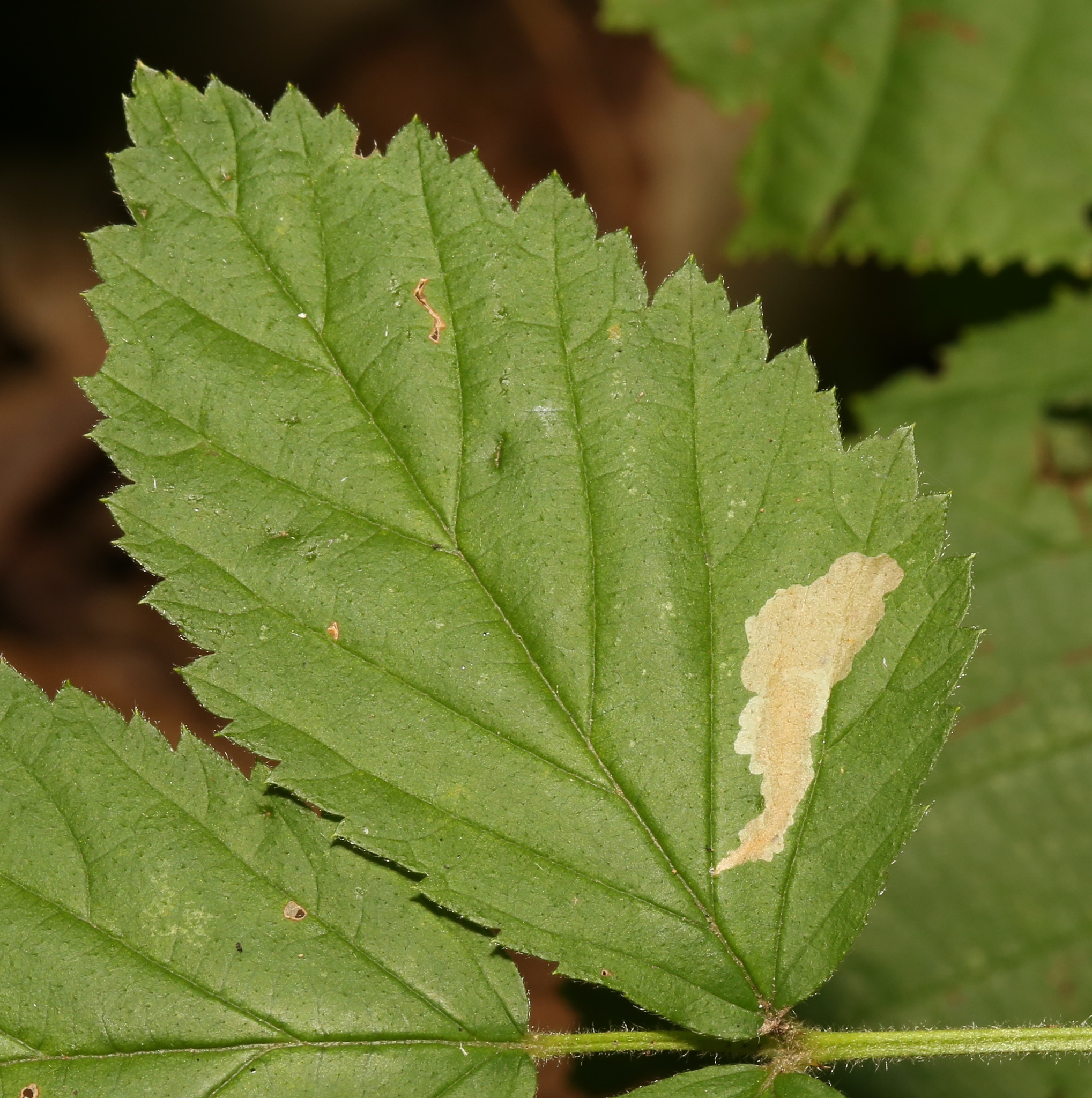
- Leaf mine on Rubus

Scientific classification
- Kingdom: Animalia
- Phylum: Arthropoda
- Clade: Pancrustacea
- Class: Insecta
- Order: Lepidoptera
- Family: Tischeriidae
- Genus: Coptotriche
- Species: C. aenea

Binomial name
- Coptotriche aenea (Frey & Boll, 1873)

Synonyms
- Tischeria aenea Frey & Boll, 1873

= Coptotriche aenea =

Species of moth

Coptotriche aenea is a moth of the family Tischeriidae. It is found in North America, including Nova Scotia, Ontario, Arkansas, Connecticut, the District of Columbia, Florida, Kentucky, Mississippi, New Jersey, Ohio, Oklahoma, Pennsylvania, Texas and West Virginia.

The larvae feed on Rubus allegheniensis, Rubus flagellaris, Rubus frondosus, Rubus occidentalis and Rubus villosus. They mine the leaves of their host plant.
