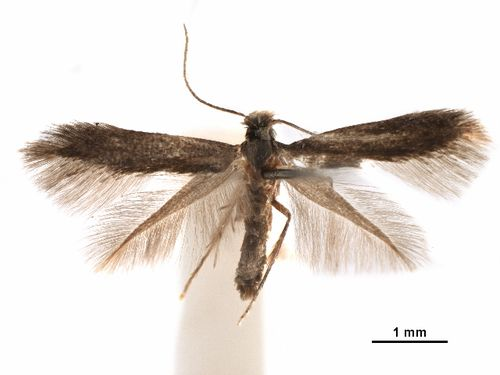

Scientific classification
- Kingdom: Animalia
- Phylum: Arthropoda
- Clade: Pancrustacea
- Class: Insecta
- Order: Lepidoptera
- Family: Tischeriidae
- Genus: Coptotriche
- Species: C. agrimoniella

Binomial name
- Coptotriche agrimoniella (Braun, 1972)

Synonyms
- Tischeria agrimoniella Braun, 1972

= Coptotriche agrimoniella =

Species of moth

Coptotriche agrimoniella is a moth of the family Tischeriidae. It is found in North America, including Arkansas, Kentucky and Ohio.

The larvae mine Agrimonia parviflora and Agrimonia rostellata.
