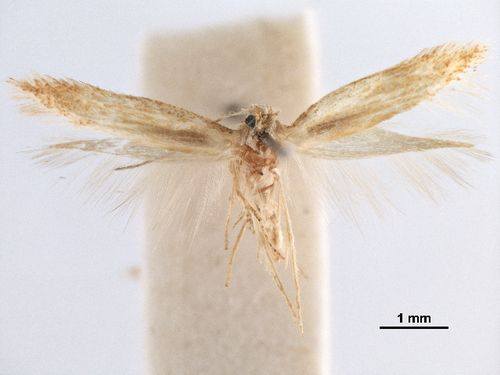

Scientific classification
- Kingdom: Animalia
- Phylum: Arthropoda
- Clade: Pancrustacea
- Class: Insecta
- Order: Lepidoptera
- Family: Tischeriidae
- Genus: Coptotriche
- Species: C. clemensella

Binomial name
- Coptotriche clemensella (Chambers, 1878)

Synonyms
- Tischeria clemensella Chambers, 1878; Tischeria bicolor Frey & Boll, 1878

= Coptotriche clemensella =

Species of moth

Coptotriche clemensella is a moth of the family Tischeriidae. It was described by Vactor Tousey Chambers in 1878. It is found in the US states of Arkansas, Kentucky, Ohio and Texas.

The larvae feed on Quercus macrocarpa, Quercus marilandica and Quercus palustris. They mine the leaves of their host plant.
