= Coptotriche inexpectata =

Scientific classification
- Domain: Eukaryota
- Kingdom: Animalia
- Phylum: Arthropoda
- Class: Insecta
- Order: Lepidoptera
- Family: Tischeriidae
- Genus: Coptotriche
- Species: C. inexpectata

Binomial name
- Coptotriche inexpectata (Braun, 1972)

Synonyms
- Tischeria inexpectata Braun, 1972

Species of moth

Coptotriche inexpectata is a moth of the family Tischeriidae. It was described by Annette Frances Braun in 1972. It is found in the US state of California.

The larvae feed on Fragaria species. They mine the leaves of their host plant.
