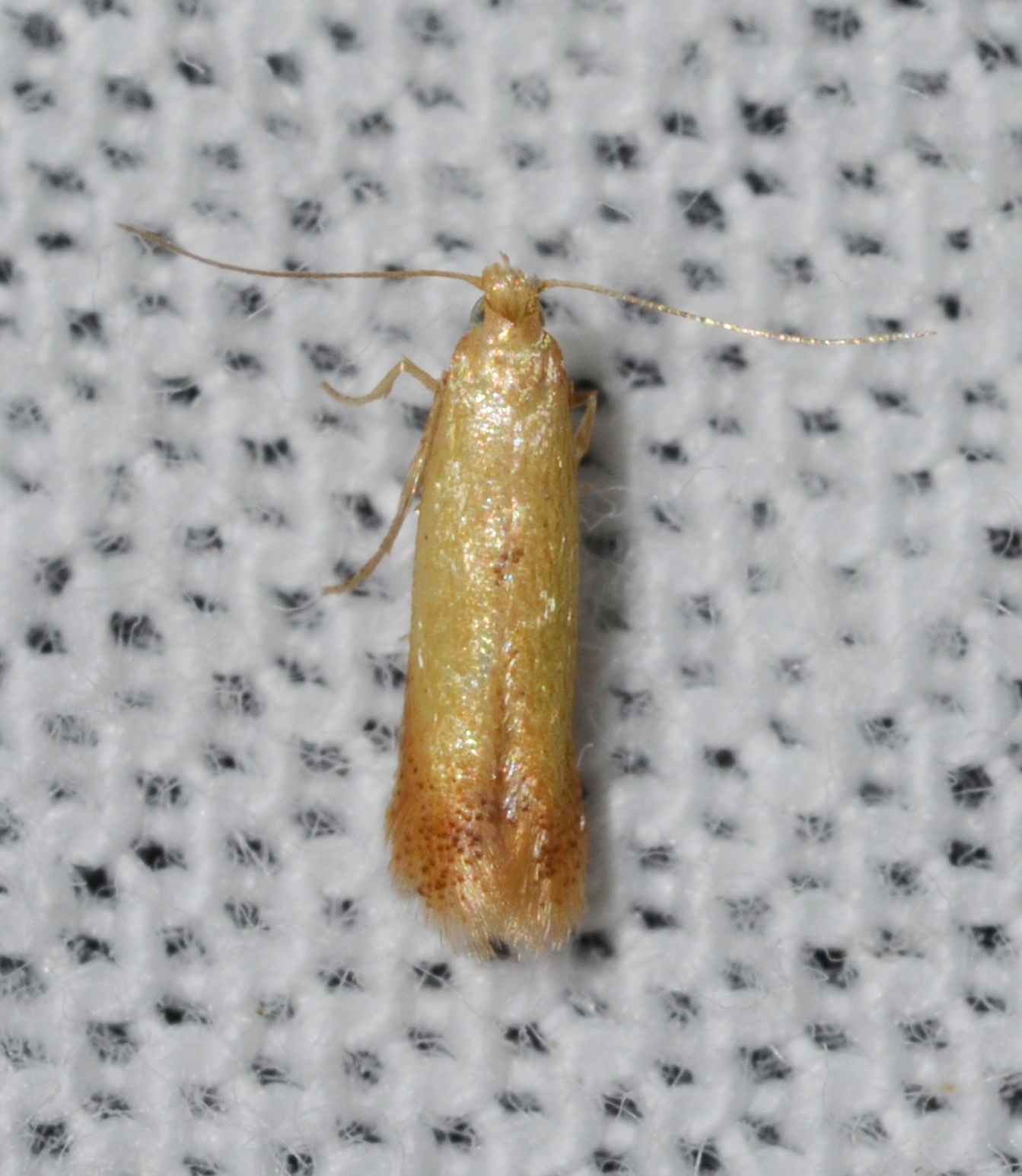

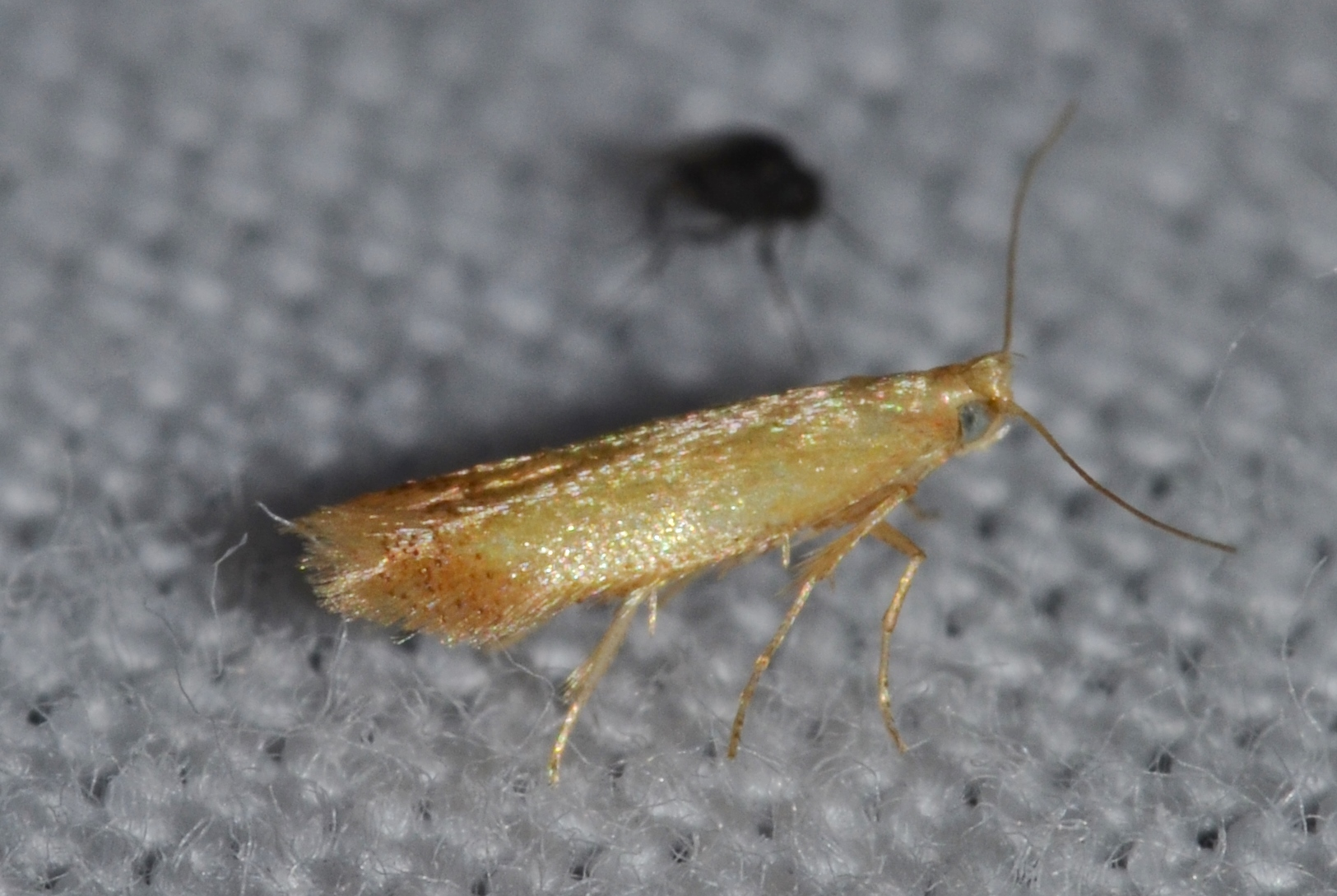

Scientific classification
- Kingdom: Animalia
- Phylum: Arthropoda
- Class: Insecta
- Order: Lepidoptera
- Family: Tischeriidae
- Genus: Coptotriche
- Species: C. citrinipennella

Binomial name
- Coptotriche citrinipennella (Clemens, 1859)

Synonyms
- Tischeria citrinipennella Clemens, 1859; Tischeria quercivorella Chambers, 1875

= Coptotriche citrinipennella =

Species of moth

Coptotriche citrinipennella is a moth of the family Tischeriidae. It was described by James Brackenridge Clemens in 1859. It is found in North American in Nova Scotia, Ontario, Quebec, Arkansas, the District of Columbia, Indiana, Kentucky, Massachusetts, Missouri, New Jersey, New York, North Carolina, Ohio, Pennsylvania, Texas, Virginia and West Virginia.

The larvae feed on Castanea dentata, Castanea mollissima, Castanea crenata, Quercus coccinea, Quercus ilicifolia, Quercus imbricaria, Quercus marilandica, Quercus palustris, Quercus phellos and Quercus rubra. They mine the leaves of their host plant.
