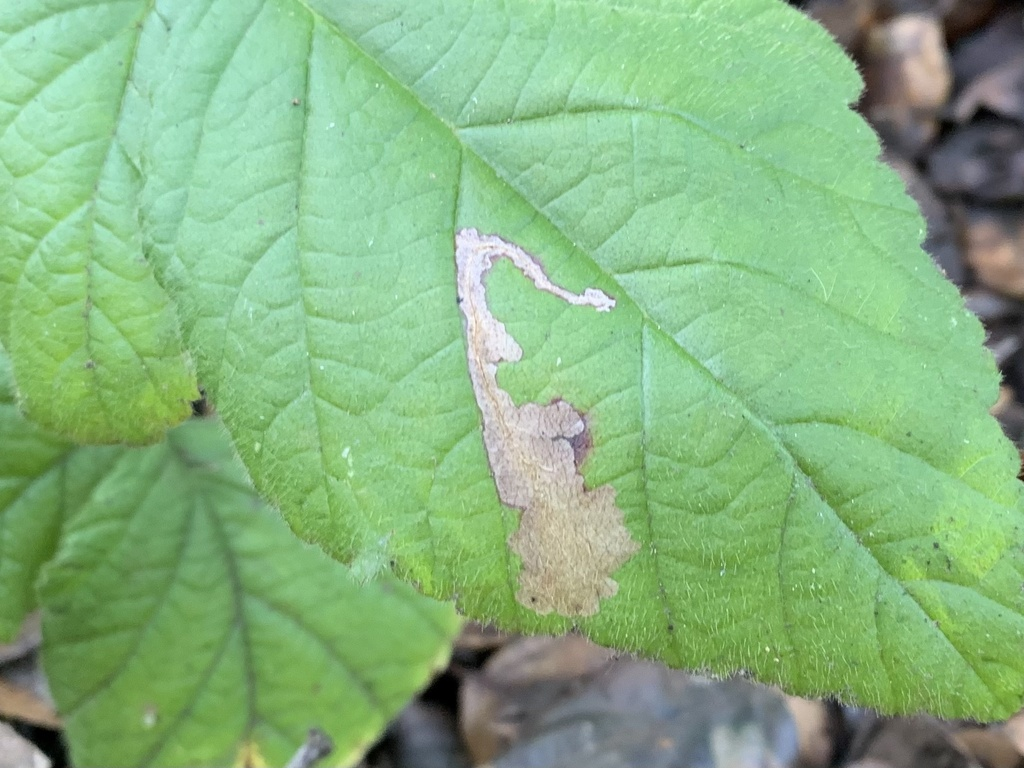

Scientific classification
- Kingdom: Animalia
- Phylum: Arthropoda
- Clade: Pancrustacea
- Class: Insecta
- Order: Lepidoptera
- Family: Tischeriidae
- Genus: Coptotriche
- Species: C. splendida

Binomial name
- Coptotriche splendida (Braun, 1972)

Synonyms
- Tischeria splendida Braun, 1972

= Coptotriche splendida =

Species of moth

Coptotriche splendida is a moth of the family Tischeriidae. It was described by Annette Frances Braun in 1972. It is found in the US state of California.

The larvae feed on Rubus ursinus. They mine the leaves of their host plant.
