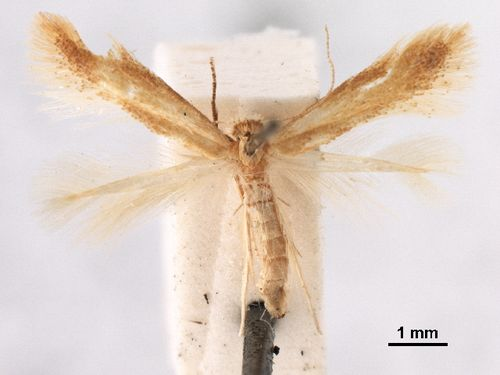

Scientific classification
- Kingdom: Animalia
- Phylum: Arthropoda
- Clade: Pancrustacea
- Class: Insecta
- Order: Lepidoptera
- Family: Tischeriidae
- Genus: Coptotriche
- Species: C. consanguinea

Binomial name
- Coptotriche consanguinea (Braun, 1972)

Synonyms
- Tischeria consanguinea Braun, 1972

= Coptotriche consanguinea =

Species of moth

Coptotriche consanguinea is a moth of the family Tischeriidae. It was described by Annette Frances Braun in 1972. It is found in the US state of California.

The larvae feed on Quercus dumosa, Quercus garryana, Quercus lobata and Quercus turbinella. They mine the leaves of their host plant.
