= Coptotriche amelanchieris =

Scientific classification
- Domain: Eukaryota
- Kingdom: Animalia
- Phylum: Arthropoda
- Class: Insecta
- Order: Lepidoptera
- Family: Tischeriidae
- Genus: Coptotriche
- Species: C. amelanchieris

Binomial name
- Coptotriche amelanchieris (Braun, 1972)

Synonyms
- Tischeria amelanchieris Braun, 1972

Species of moth

Coptotriche amelanchieris is a moth of the family Tischeriidae. It is found in North America, including Ohio and Kentucky.

The larvae feed on Amelanchier arborea. They mine the leaves of their host plant.
