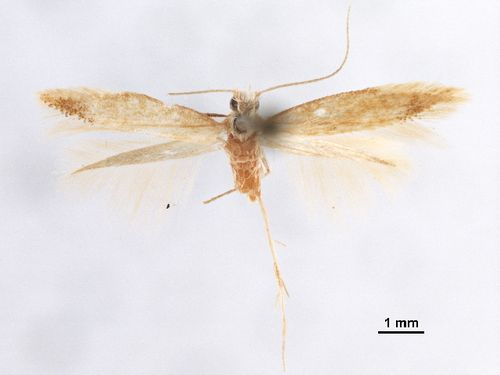

Scientific classification
- Kingdom: Animalia
- Phylum: Arthropoda
- Clade: Pancrustacea
- Class: Insecta
- Order: Lepidoptera
- Family: Tischeriidae
- Genus: Coptotriche
- Species: C. distincta

Binomial name
- Coptotriche distincta (Braun, 1972)

Synonyms
- Tischeria distincta Braun, 1972

= Coptotriche distincta =

Species of moth

Coptotriche distincta is a moth of the family Tischeriidae. It was described by Annette Frances Braun in 1972. It is found in the US state of Arizona.

The larvae feed on Quercus hypoleucoides. They mine the leaves of their host plant.
