= Coptotriche gaunacella =

Scientific classification
- Kingdom: Animalia
- Phylum: Arthropoda
- Class: Insecta
- Order: Lepidoptera
- Family: Tischeriidae
- Genus: Coptotriche
- Species: C. gaunacella

Binomial name
- Coptotriche gaunacella (Duponchel, 1843)

Species of moth

Coptotriche gaunacella is a species of moth belonging to the family Tischeriidae.

It is native to Europe.

== Distribution and biology ==
The wingspan of *Coptotriche gaunacella* is normally between 6.5 and 8.0 mm. The forewings are yellowish-white with a small blackish spot at the apex. The hindwings are grey.
