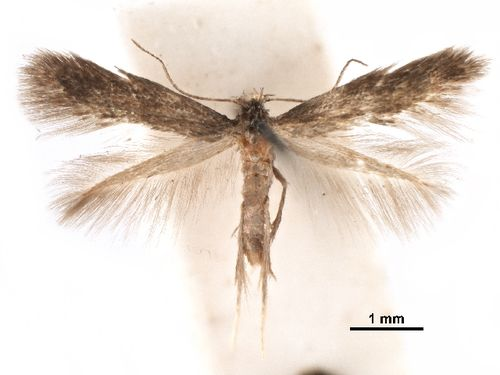

Scientific classification
- Kingdom: Animalia
- Phylum: Arthropoda
- Clade: Pancrustacea
- Class: Insecta
- Order: Lepidoptera
- Family: Tischeriidae
- Genus: Coptotriche
- Species: C. confusa

Binomial name
- Coptotriche confusa (Braun, 1972)

Synonyms
- Tischeria confusa Braun, 1972

= Coptotriche confusa =

Species of moth

Coptotriche confusa is a moth of the family Tischeriidae. It was described by Annette Frances Braun in 1972. It is found in the US state of California.

The larvae feed on Fragaria species. They mine the leaves of their host plant.
