= Coptotriche insolita =

Scientific classification
- Domain: Eukaryota
- Kingdom: Animalia
- Phylum: Arthropoda
- Class: Insecta
- Order: Lepidoptera
- Family: Tischeriidae
- Genus: Coptotriche
- Species: C. insolita

Binomial name
- Coptotriche insolita (Braun, 1972)

Synonyms
- Tischeria insolita Braun, 1972

Species of moth

Coptotriche insolita is a moth of the family Tischeriidae. It was described by Annette Frances Braun in 1972. It is found in the US state of New Jersey.

The larvae feed on Vaccinium corymbosum. They mine the leaves of their host plant.
