= Coptotriche discreta =

Scientific classification
- Kingdom: Animalia
- Phylum: Arthropoda
- Class: Insecta
- Order: Lepidoptera
- Family: Tischeriidae
- Genus: Coptotriche
- Species: C. discreta

Binomial name
- Coptotriche discreta (Braun, 1972)

Synonyms
- Tischeria discreta Braun, 1972

Species of moth

Coptotriche discreta is a species of moth in the family Tischeriidae. It was first described by Annette Frances Braun in 1972. It is found on Santa Cruz Island in the US state of California.

The larvae feed on Quercus agrifolia, Quercus chrysolepis, Quercus suber and Quercus wislizenii. They mine the leaves of their host plant.
