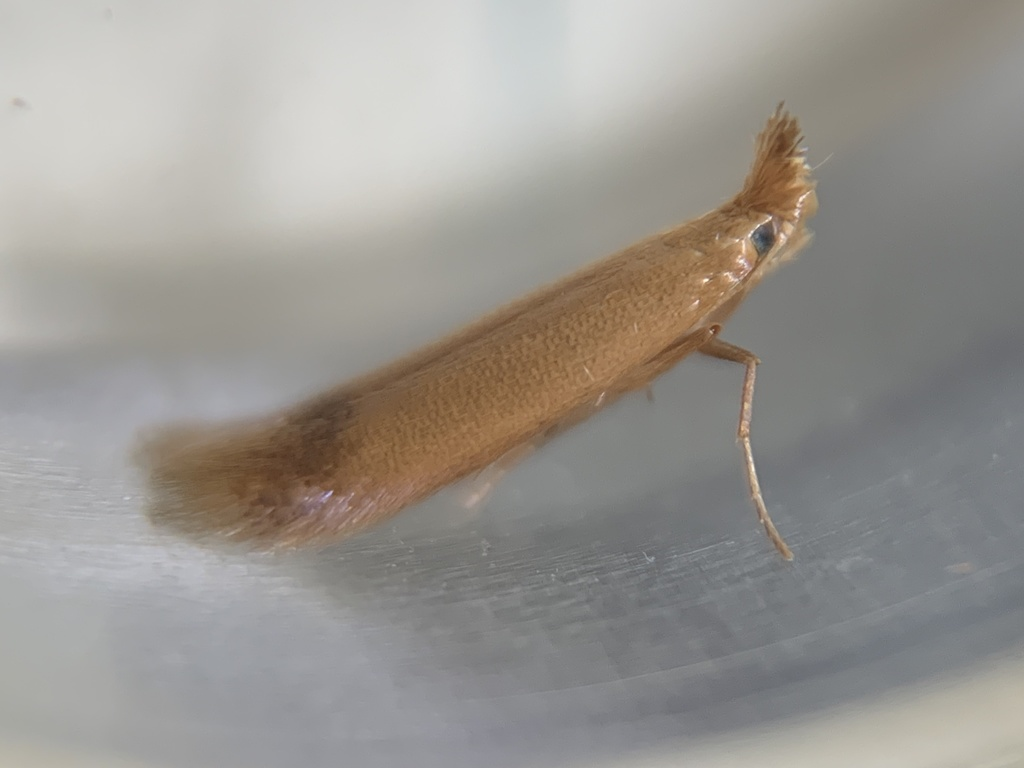

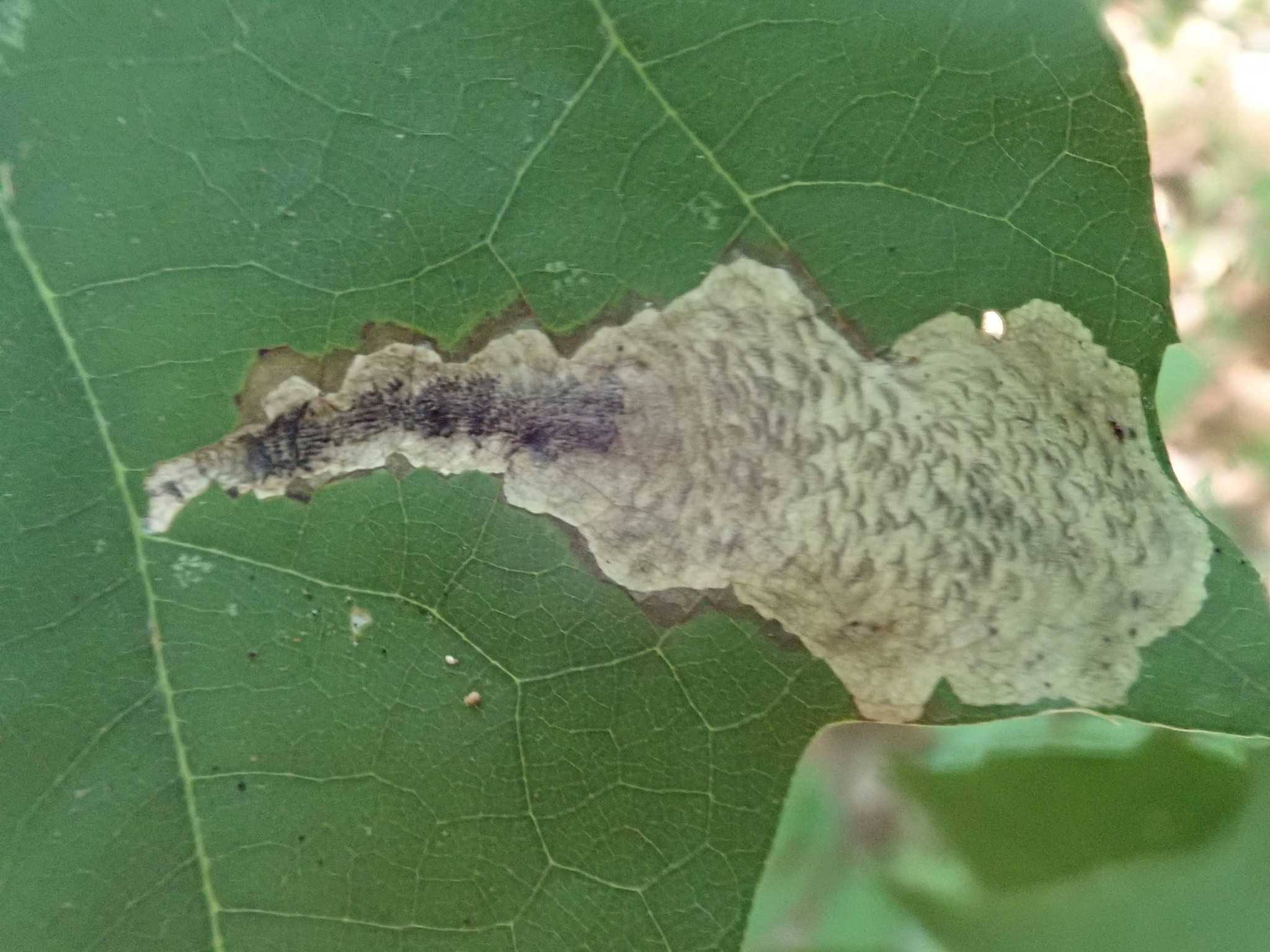
- An adult C. castaneaeella and leaf damage caused by C. castaneaeella larvae

Scientific classification
- Kingdom: Animalia
- Phylum: Arthropoda
- Class: Insecta
- Order: Lepidoptera
- Family: Tischeriidae
- Genus: Coptotriche
- Species: C. castaneaeella

Binomial name
- Coptotriche castaneaeella (Chambers, 1875)

Synonyms
- Tischeria castaneaeella Chambers, 1875; Tischeria cinereotunicella Braun, 1927

= Coptotriche castaneaeella =

Species of moth

Coptotriche castaneaeella is a moth of the family Tischeriidae. It was described by Vactor Tousey Chambers in 1875. It is found in the US states of Florida, Illinois, Kentucky, New Jersey, Ohio and Virginia.

The larvae feed on Quercus alba, Quercus bicolor, Quercus coccinea, Quercus imbricaria, Quercus marilandica, Quercus phellos, Quercus prinus, Quercus rubra and Quercus velutina. They mine the leaves of their host plant. The mine has the form of a trumpet mine.
