= Coptotriche arizonica =

Scientific classification
- Domain: Eukaryota
- Kingdom: Animalia
- Phylum: Arthropoda
- Class: Insecta
- Order: Lepidoptera
- Family: Tischeriidae
- Genus: Coptotriche
- Species: C. arizonica

Binomial name
- Coptotriche arizonica (Braun, 1972)

Synonyms
- Tischeria arizonica Braun, 1972

Species of moth

Coptotriche arizonica is a moth of the family Tischeriidae. It is found in North America, including California, Arizona and Texas.

The larvae feed on Quercus species, including Quercus arizonica and Quercus reticulata. They mine the leaves of their host plant.
