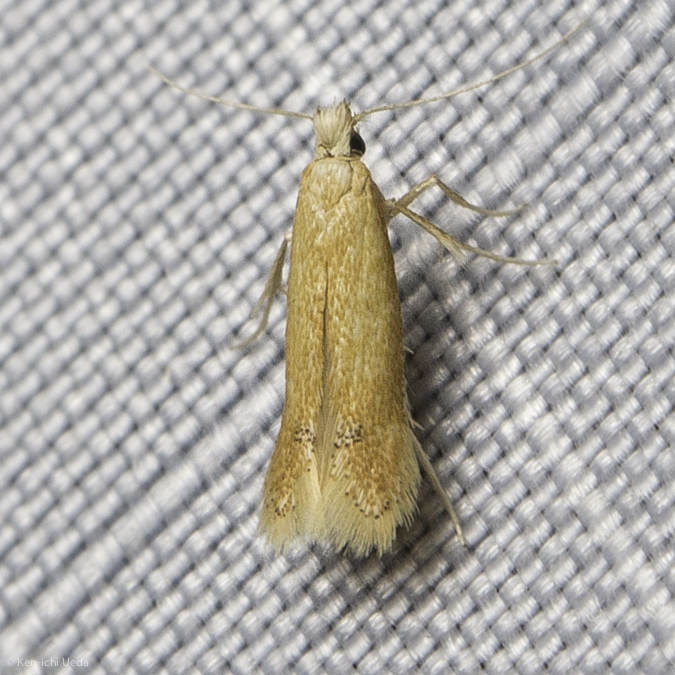

Scientific classification
- Domain: Eukaryota
- Kingdom: Animalia
- Phylum: Arthropoda
- Class: Insecta
- Order: Lepidoptera
- Family: Tischeriidae
- Genus: Coptotriche
- Species: C. mediostriata

Binomial name
- Coptotriche mediostriata (Braun, 1927)

Synonyms
- Tischeria mediostriata Braun, 1972

= Coptotriche mediostriata =

Species of moth

Coptotriche mediostriata is a moth of the family Tischeriidae. It was described by Annette Frances Braun in 1927. It is found in the US states of Arizona, California, Colorado, New Mexico and Washington.

The larvae feed on Quercus gambelii, Quercus kelloggii, Quercus oblongifolia and probably Quercus garryana. They mine the leaves of their host plant.
