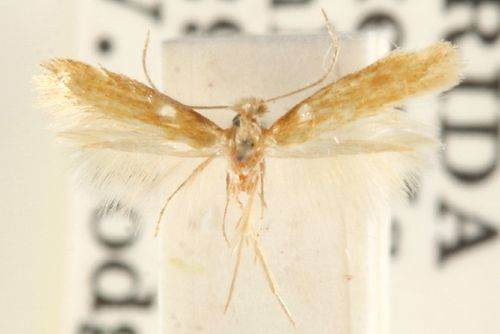

Scientific classification
- Kingdom: Animalia
- Phylum: Arthropoda
- Clade: Pancrustacea
- Class: Insecta
- Order: Lepidoptera
- Family: Tischeriidae
- Genus: Coptotriche
- Species: C. lucida

Binomial name
- Coptotriche lucida (Braun, 1972)

Synonyms
- Tischeria lucida Braun, 1972

= Coptotriche lucida =

Species of moth

Coptotriche lucida is a moth of the family Tischeriidae. It was described by Annette Frances Braun in 1972. It is found in the US state of Florida.
