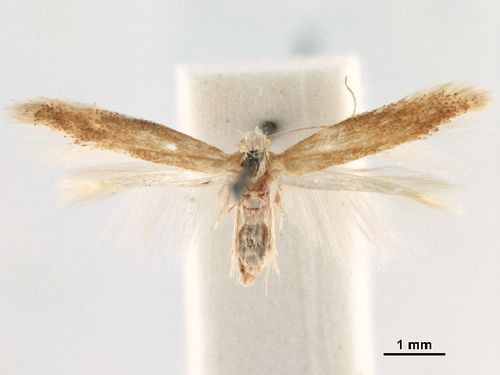

Scientific classification
- Kingdom: Animalia
- Phylum: Arthropoda
- Clade: Pancrustacea
- Class: Insecta
- Order: Lepidoptera
- Family: Tischeriidae
- Genus: Coptotriche
- Species: C. subnubila

Binomial name
- Coptotriche subnubila (Braun, 1972)

Synonyms
- Tischeria subnubila Braun, 1972

= Coptotriche subnubila =

Species of moth

Coptotriche subnubila is a moth of the family Tischeriidae. It was described by Annette Frances Braun in 1972. It is found in the US states of Arizona and New Mexico.

The larvae feed on Quercus grisea. They mine the leaves of their host plant.
