= Coptotriche tantalella =

Scientific classification
- Kingdom: Animalia
- Phylum: Arthropoda
- Clade: Pancrustacea
- Class: Insecta
- Order: Lepidoptera
- Family: Tischeriidae
- Genus: Coptotriche
- Species: C. tantalella

Binomial name
- Coptotriche tantalella (Walsingham, 1908)

Synonyms
- Tischeria tantalella Walsingham, 1908

Species of moth

Coptotriche tantalella is a moth of the family Tischeriidae. It is found on the Canary Islands.

The wingspan is about 8 mm. The forewings are pale fawn-ochreous, sprinkled with yellowish. The hindwings are pale grey.
