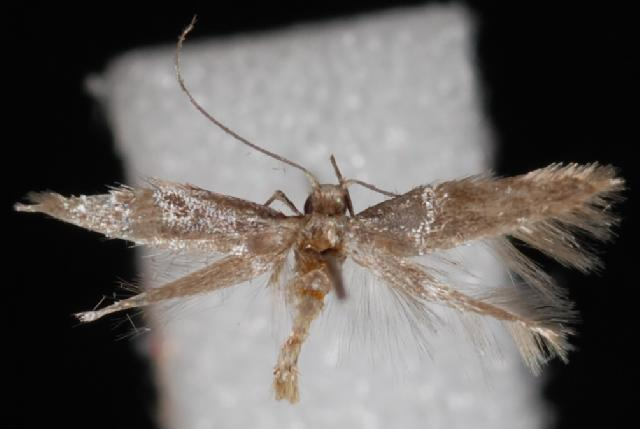

Scientific classification
- Kingdom: Animalia
- Phylum: Arthropoda
- Clade: Pancrustacea
- Class: Insecta
- Order: Lepidoptera
- Family: Tischeriidae
- Genus: Coptotriche
- Species: C. malifoliella

Binomial name
- Coptotriche malifoliella (Clemens, 1860)

Synonyms
- Tischeria malifoliella Clemens, 1860

= Coptotriche malifoliella =

Species of moth

Coptotriche malifoliella is a moth of the family Tischeriidae. It was described by James Brackenridge Clemens in 1860. It is found in North America in Ontario, the District of Columbia, Indiana, Kentucky, Massachusetts, New Jersey, New York, Ohio, Pennsylvania and Texas.

The larvae feed on Crataegus coccinea, Malus coronaria and Malus domestica. They mine the leaves of their host plant.
