= Coptotriche basipectinella =

Scientific classification
- Domain: Eukaryota
- Kingdom: Animalia
- Phylum: Arthropoda
- Class: Insecta
- Order: Lepidoptera
- Family: Tischeriidae
- Genus: Coptotriche
- Species: C. basipectinella

Binomial name
- Coptotriche basipectinella Puplesis & Diškus, 2003

Species of moth

Coptotriche basipectinella is a moth of the family Tischeriidae that can be found in South Africa and Harare, Zimbabwe.

The larvae feed on Terminalia sericea. They mine the leaves of their host plant.
