= Coptotriche japoniella =

Scientific classification
- Domain: Eukaryota
- Kingdom: Animalia
- Phylum: Arthropoda
- Class: Insecta
- Order: Lepidoptera
- Family: Tischeriidae
- Genus: Coptotriche
- Species: C. japoniella

Binomial name
- Coptotriche japoniella Puplesis & Diškus, 2003

Species of moth

Coptotriche japoniella is a moth of the family Tischeriidae that is endemic to Japan.

The wingspan is about 7 millimetres (0.28 in).

The larvae feed on Eurya japonica and Eurya emarginata. They mine the leaves of their host plant.
