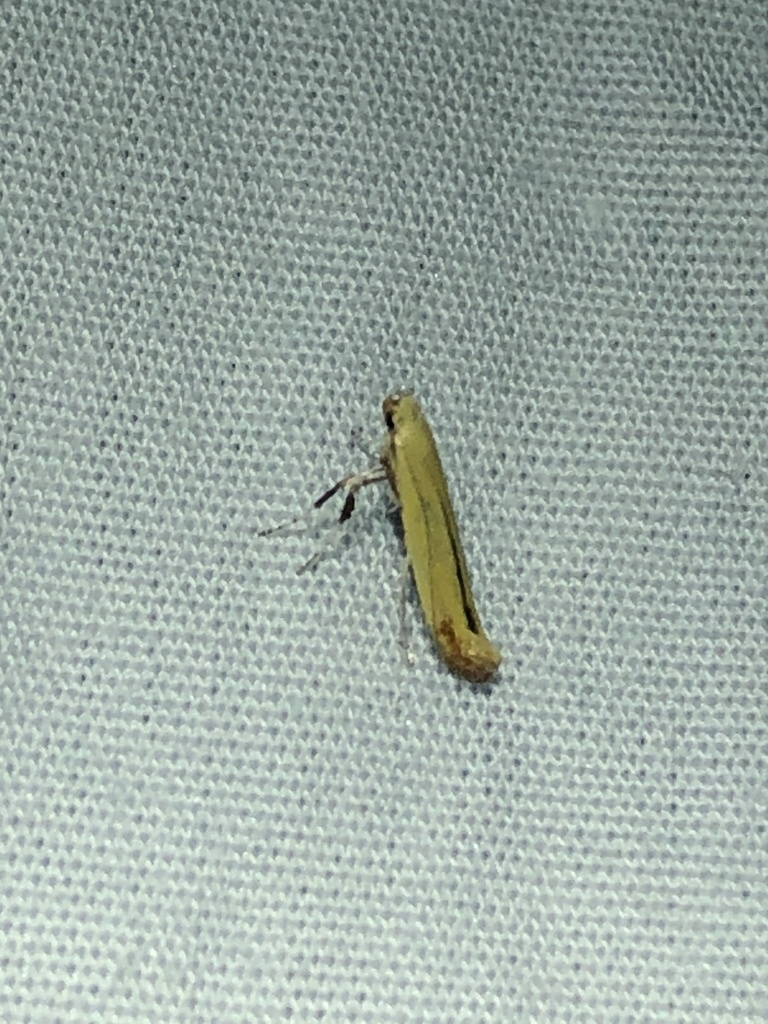

Scientific classification
- Kingdom: Animalia
- Phylum: Arthropoda
- Clade: Pancrustacea
- Class: Insecta
- Order: Lepidoptera
- Family: Gracillariidae
- Genus: Caloptilia
- Species: C. nondeterminata

Binomial name
- Caloptilia nondeterminata (Braun, 1939)

= Caloptilia nondeterminata =

Species of moth

Caloptilia nondeterminata is a moth of the family Gracillariidae. It has been recorded in Oregon and Washington in the United States.

The larvae feed on Ribes species. They mine the leaves of their host plant.
