= Coptotriche zimbabwiensis =

Scientific classification
- Domain: Eukaryota
- Kingdom: Animalia
- Phylum: Arthropoda
- Class: Insecta
- Order: Lepidoptera
- Family: Tischeriidae
- Genus: Coptotriche
- Species: C. zimbabwiensis

Binomial name
- Coptotriche zimbabwiensis Puplesis & Diškus, 2003

Species of moth

Coptotriche zimbabwiensis is a moth of the family Tischeriidae, found in the Bvumba Mountains of Zimbabwe.
