= Coptotriche forsteroniae =

Scientific classification
- Kingdom: Animalia
- Phylum: Arthropoda
- Clade: Pancrustacea
- Class: Insecta
- Order: Lepidoptera
- Family: Tischeriidae
- Genus: Coptotriche
- Species: C. forsteroniae

Binomial name
- Coptotriche forsteroniae Stonis & Diškus, 2008

Species of moth

Coptotriche forsteroniae is a moth of the family Tischeriidae. It was described by Stonis and Diškus in 2008. It is found in Belize.

The larvae feed on Forsteronia myriantha. They mine the leaves of their host plant.
