= Blackjack Island =

Island in Ware County, Georgia, US

Coordinates: 30°39′24″N 82°18′34″W

Blackjack Island is an island in Ware County, in the U.S. state of Georgia named for its abundance of blackjack oak timber.
