= Elachista acenteta =

Scientific classification
- Domain: Eukaryota
- Kingdom: Animalia
- Phylum: Arthropoda
- Class: Insecta
- Order: Lepidoptera
- Family: Elachistidae
- Genus: Elachista
- Species: E. acenteta

Binomial name
- Elachista acenteta Braun, 1948

Species of moth

Elachista acenteta is a moth of the family Elachistidae. It is found in North America in Nova Scotia, Ontario, Quebec, Colorado and Nebraska.

The length of the forewings is 4.5–6.2 mm.
