= Coptotriche berberella =

Scientific classification
- Kingdom: Animalia
- Phylum: Arthropoda
- Clade: Pancrustacea
- Class: Insecta
- Order: Lepidoptera
- Family: Tischeriidae
- Genus: Coptotriche
- Species: C. berberella

Binomial name
- Coptotriche berberella (De Prins, 1984)

Synonyms
- Tischeria berberella De Prins, 1984

Species of moth

Coptotriche berberella is a moth of the family Tischeriidae. It is found in Morocco and on the Iberian Peninsula.
