= Coptotriche pulverea =

Scientific classification
- Domain: Eukaryota
- Kingdom: Animalia
- Phylum: Arthropoda
- Class: Insecta
- Order: Lepidoptera
- Family: Tischeriidae
- Genus: Coptotriche
- Species: C. pulverea

Binomial name
- Coptotriche pulverea Walsingham, 1897

Synonyms
- Tischeria pulverea Walsingham, 1897

Species of moth

Coptotriche pulverea is a moth of the family Tischeriidae. It was described by Walsingham in 1897. It is found on the Virgin Islands (St. Thomas) and in Belize.

The larvae feed on Terminalia amazonia. They mine the leaves of their host plant.
