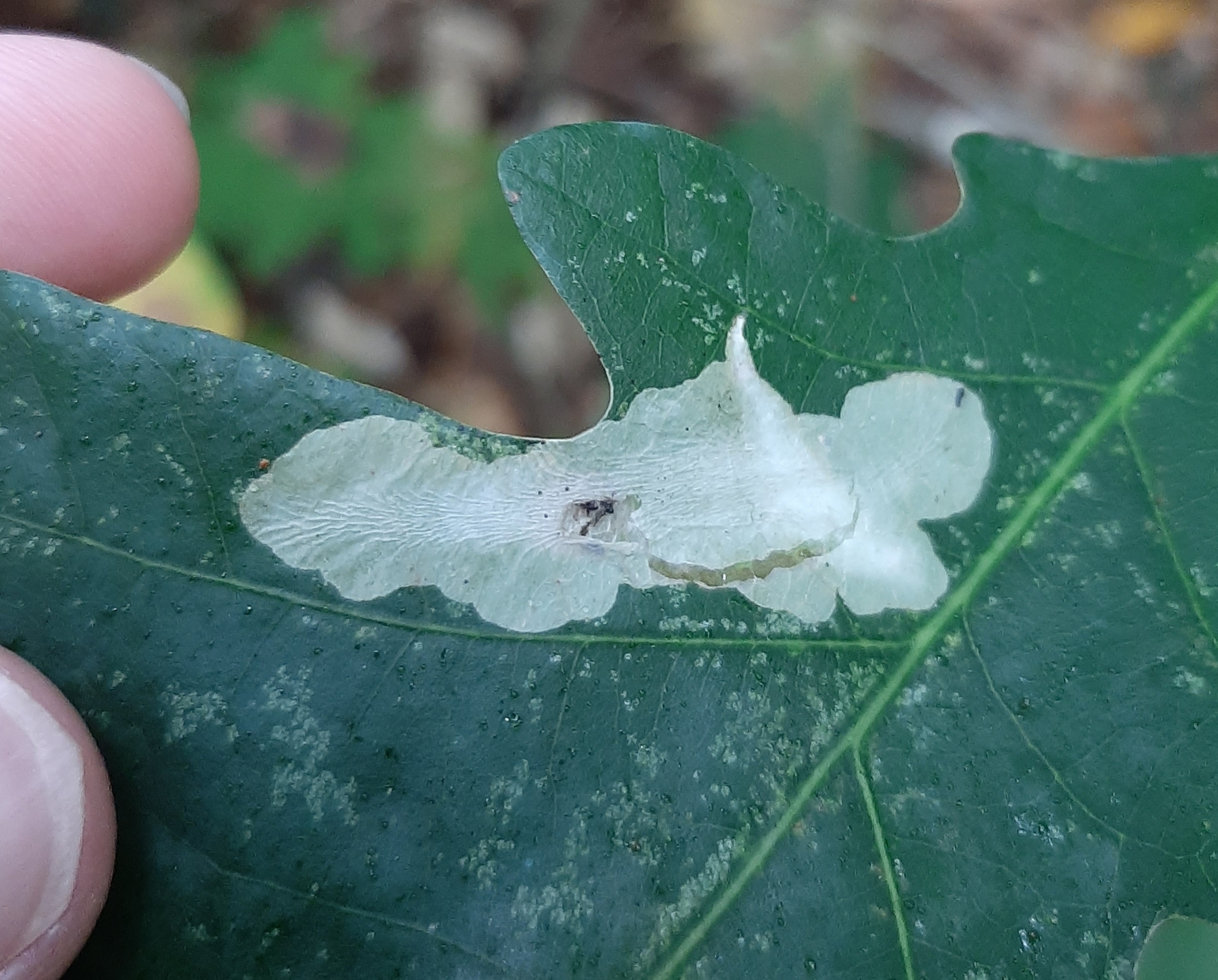
- Leaf mine caused by Coptotriche badiiella

Scientific classification
- Kingdom: Animalia
- Phylum: Arthropoda
- Clade: Pancrustacea
- Class: Insecta
- Order: Lepidoptera
- Family: Tischeriidae
- Genus: Coptotriche
- Species: C. badiiella

Binomial name
- Coptotriche badiiella (Chambers, 1875)

Synonyms
- Tischeria badiiella; Tischeria bodicella Chambers, 1875; Tischeria nubila Braun, 1920

= Coptotriche badiiella =

Species of moth

Coptotriche badiiella is a species of moth in the family Tischeriidae. It is found in eastern North America, from Ontario and Michigan south to Louisiana and North Carolina.

The larvae feed on Quercus species, including Quercus alba and Quercus palustris. They mine the leaves of their host plant. The mine has the form of an ovate blotch mine.
