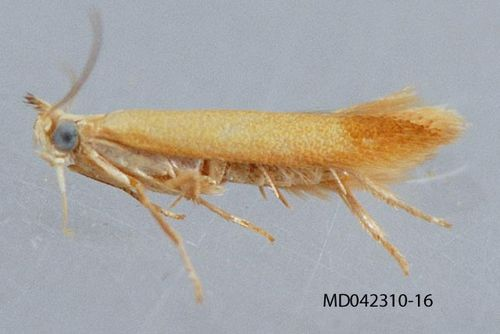

Scientific classification
- Kingdom: Animalia
- Phylum: Arthropoda
- Clade: Pancrustacea
- Class: Insecta
- Order: Lepidoptera
- Family: Tischeriidae
- Genus: Coptotriche
- Species: C. fuscomarginella

Binomial name
- Coptotriche fuscomarginella (Chambers, 1875)

Synonyms
- Tischeria fuscomarginella Chambers, 1875

= Coptotriche fuscomarginella =

Species of moth

Coptotriche fuscomarginella is a moth of the family Tischeriidae. It was described by Vactor Tousey Chambers in 1875. It is found in the US states of Kentucky, Massachusetts, New Jersey, New York, Ohio and Virginia.

The larvae feed on Castanea dentata, Quercus muehlenbergii and Quercus prinus. They mine the leaves of their host plant.
