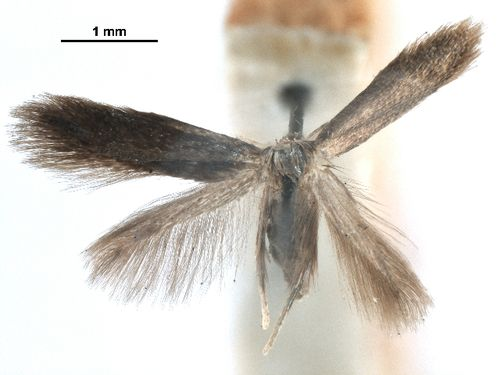

Scientific classification
- Kingdom: Animalia
- Phylum: Arthropoda
- Clade: Pancrustacea
- Class: Insecta
- Order: Lepidoptera
- Family: Tischeriidae
- Genus: Coptotriche
- Species: C. roseticola

Binomial name
- Coptotriche roseticola (Frey & Boll, 1873)

Synonyms
- Tischeria roseticola Frey & Boll, 1873

= Coptotriche roseticola =

Species of moth

Coptotriche roseticola is a moth of the family Tischeriidae. It was described by Frey and Boll in 1873. It is found in Ohio.

The larvae feed on Rosa setigera. They mine the leaves of their host plant.
