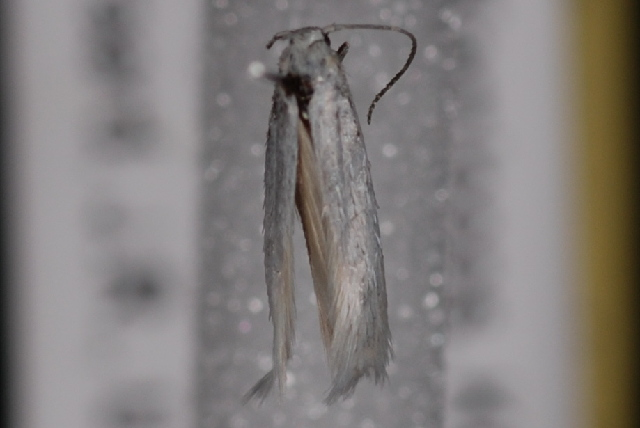

Scientific classification
- Domain: Eukaryota
- Kingdom: Animalia
- Phylum: Arthropoda
- Class: Insecta
- Order: Lepidoptera
- Family: Elachistidae
- Genus: Elachista
- Species: E. hololeuca

Binomial name
- Elachista hololeuca Braun, 1948

= Elachista hololeuca =

Species of moth

Elachista hololeuca is a moth of the family Elachistidae. It was first described from Wyoming and is also known from Arizona, California, Colorado, Nevada, Oregon, Washington in the United States as well as from British Columbia, Canada.

The length of the forewings is 5.1 millimetres (0.20 in).
