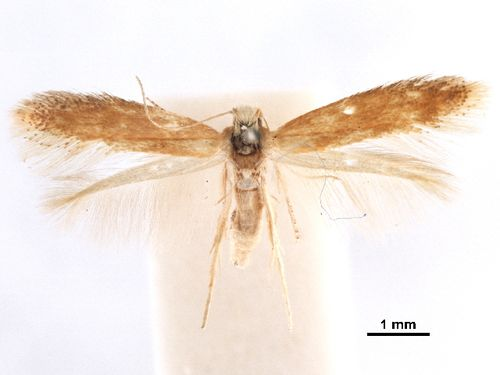

Scientific classification
- Kingdom: Animalia
- Phylum: Arthropoda
- Clade: Pancrustacea
- Class: Insecta
- Order: Lepidoptera
- Family: Tischeriidae
- Genus: Coptotriche
- Species: C. concolor

Binomial name
- Coptotriche concolor (Zeller, 1875)

Synonyms
- Tischeria concolor Zeller, 1875

= Coptotriche concolor =

Species of moth

Coptotriche concolor is a moth of the family Tischeriidae. It was described by Zeller in 1875. It is found in Arkansas, the District of Columbia, Illinois, Texas and Virginia.

The larvae feed on Quercus species. They mine the leaves of their host plant.
