= Coptotriche singularis =

Scientific classification
- Kingdom: Animalia
- Phylum: Arthropoda
- Clade: Pancrustacea
- Class: Insecta
- Order: Lepidoptera
- Family: Tischeriidae
- Genus: Coptotriche
- Species: C. singularis

Binomial name
- Coptotriche singularis Stonis & Diškus, 2008

Species of moth

Coptotriche singularis is a moth of the family Tischeriidae. It was described by Stonis and Diškus in 2008. It is found in Belize.
