= Elachista aurocristata =

Scientific classification
- Domain: Eukaryota
- Kingdom: Animalia
- Phylum: Arthropoda
- Class: Insecta
- Order: Lepidoptera
- Family: Elachistidae
- Genus: Elachista
- Species: E. aurocristata

Binomial name
- Elachista aurocristata Braun, 1921

Species of moth

Elachista aurocristata is a moth of the family Elachistidae. It is found in North America in Montana, Oregon, Washington, British Columbia, and Alberta.

The length of the forewings is 4.8–5.5 mm.
