= Coptotriche kenyensis =

Scientific classification
- Kingdom: Animalia
- Phylum: Arthropoda
- Clade: Pancrustacea
- Class: Insecta
- Order: Lepidoptera
- Family: Tischeriidae
- Genus: Coptotriche
- Species: C. kenyensis

Binomial name
- Coptotriche kenyensis Mey, 2010

Species of moth

Coptotriche kenyensis is a moth of the family Tischeriidae. It is found in Kenya.
