= Coptotriche heinemanni =

Scientific classification
- Domain: Eukaryota
- Kingdom: Animalia
- Phylum: Arthropoda
- Class: Insecta
- Order: Lepidoptera
- Family: Tischeriidae
- Genus: Coptotriche
- Species: C. heinemanni

Binomial name
- Coptotriche heinemanni (Wocke, 1871)

Synonyms
- Tischeria heinemanni Wocke, 1871; Emmetia heinemanni

Species of moth

Coptotriche heinemanni is a moth of the family Tischeriidae. It is found in most of Europe, except the Iberian Peninsula and the Balkan Peninsula.

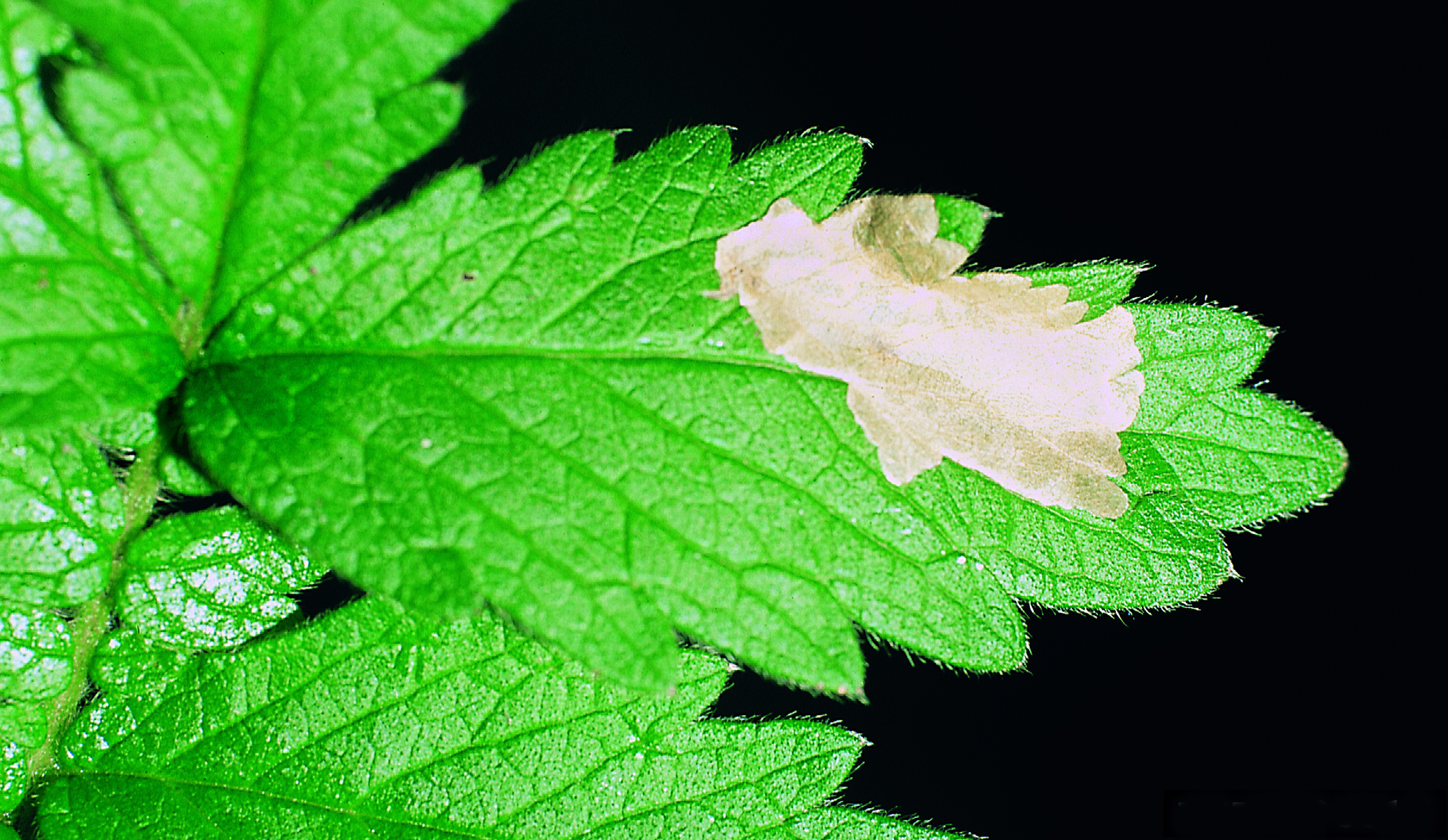
Damage

The wingspan is 8–9.5 mm.
