= Elachista epimicta =

Scientific classification
- Domain: Eukaryota
- Kingdom: Animalia
- Phylum: Arthropoda
- Class: Insecta
- Order: Lepidoptera
- Family: Elachistidae
- Genus: Elachista
- Species: E. epimicta

Binomial name
- Elachista epimicta Braun, 1948

Synonyms
- Elachista purissima Braun, 1948 – Kaila, 1997

Species of moth

Elachista epimicta is a moth of the family Elachistidae. It is widely distributed in the interior of North America, with records from Alberta, British Columbia, Manitoba, and Saskatchewan in Canada, and Colorado, Illinois, Ohio, Oklahoma, South Dakota, Washington, and Wyoming in the United States.

The length of the forewings is 4.6–7.1 millimetres (0.18–0.28 in). They mine grasses. The species overwinters in the larval form.
