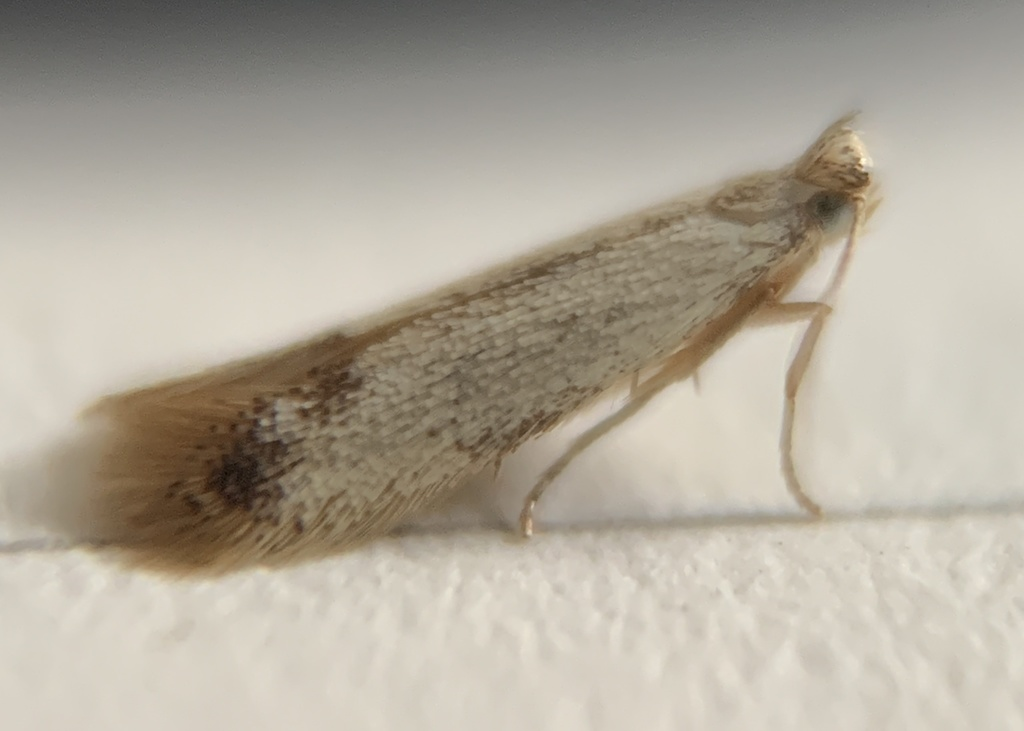

Scientific classification
- Kingdom: Animalia
- Phylum: Arthropoda
- Clade: Pancrustacea
- Class: Insecta
- Order: Lepidoptera
- Family: Tischeriidae
- Genus: Coptotriche
- Species: C. purinosella

Binomial name
- Coptotriche purinosella (Chambers, 1875)

Synonyms
- Tischeria purinosella Chambers, 1875; Tischeria albostraminea Walsingham, 1907

= Coptotriche purinosella =

Species of moth

Coptotriche purinosella is a moth of the family Tischeriidae. It was described by Vactor Tousey Chambers in 1875. It is found in the United States in the District of Columbia, Kentucky, Louisiana, New Jersey, New York, Ohio and Texas.

The larvae feed on Quercus alba, Quercus macrocarpa, Quercus montana and Quercus muehlenbergii. They mine the leaves of their host plant.
