= Coptotriche longiciliatella =

Scientific classification
- Domain: Eukaryota
- Kingdom: Animalia
- Phylum: Arthropoda
- Class: Insecta
- Order: Lepidoptera
- Family: Tischeriidae
- Genus: Coptotriche
- Species: C. longiciliatella

Binomial name
- Coptotriche longiciliatella (Rebel, 1896)

Synonyms
- Tischeria longiciliatella Rebel, 1896

Species of moth

Coptotriche longiciliatella is a moth of the family Tischeriidae. It is found on the Canary Islands.

The wingspan is about 7 mm.

The larvae feed on Rubus ulmifolius. They mine the leaves of their host plant. The mine has the form of an elongated upper-surface blotch. Pupation takes place within the mine. Larvae can be found from autumn to April.
