= Coptotriche africana =

Scientific classification
- Kingdom: Animalia
- Phylum: Arthropoda
- Class: Insecta
- Order: Lepidoptera
- Family: Tischeriidae
- Genus: Coptotriche
- Species: C. africana

Binomial name
- Coptotriche africana Puplesis and Diškus, 2003

Species of moth

Coptotriche africana is a moth of the family Tischeriidae that is found in Namibia and South Africa.

The larvae feed on Rhus guenzii, Rhus lancea and Rhus pyroides. They mine the leaves of their host plant.
