= Scrobipalpa macromaculata =

Scientific classification
- Domain: Eukaryota
- Kingdom: Animalia
- Phylum: Arthropoda
- Class: Insecta
- Order: Lepidoptera
- Family: Gelechiidae
- Genus: Scrobipalpa
- Species: S. macromaculata

Binomial name
- Scrobipalpa macromaculata (Braun, 1925)

Synonyms
- Gnorimoschema macromaculata Braun, 1925

Species of moth

Scrobipalpa macromaculata is a moth in the family Gelechiidae. It was described by Annette Frances Braun in 1925. It is found in North America, where it has been recorded from Utah and Washington.

The wingspan is 14–15 mm (0.55–0.59 in).
