= Coptotriche alavelona =

Scientific classification
- Kingdom: Animalia
- Phylum: Arthropoda
- Clade: Pancrustacea
- Class: Insecta
- Order: Lepidoptera
- Family: Tischeriidae
- Genus: Coptotriche
- Species: C. alavelona

Binomial name
- Coptotriche alavelona Lees & Stonis, 2007

Species of moth

Coptotriche alavelona is a moth of the family Tischeriidae. It is found on Madagascar. The specific name alavelona is Malagasy for "living forest" and refers to "astonishing biodiversity" of Madagascar tropical primary forest.

The holotype was collected in a high-elevation tropical moist forest. The wingspan is 6.7 mm (0.26 in).
