= Elachista adempta =

Scientific classification
- Domain: Eukaryota
- Kingdom: Animalia
- Phylum: Arthropoda
- Class: Insecta
- Order: Lepidoptera
- Family: Elachistidae
- Genus: Elachista
- Species: E. adempta

Binomial name
- Elachista adempta Braun, 1948

Synonyms
- Laverna albella Chambers, 1875 (preoccupied by Phigalia albella Chambers, 1875)

Species of moth

Elachista adempta is a moth of the family Elachistidae. It is found in North America in Alberta, Saskatchewan, Colorado, Nebraska, Nevada, Utah and Wyoming.

The length of the forewings is 4–6.3 mm.
