= Elachista lamina =

Scientific classification
- Domain: Eukaryota
- Kingdom: Animalia
- Phylum: Arthropoda
- Class: Insecta
- Order: Lepidoptera
- Family: Elachistidae
- Genus: Elachista
- Species: E. lamina

Binomial name
- Elachista lamina Braun, 1948

Species of moth

Elachista lamina is a moth of the family Elachistidae. It is found in Washington (United States) and British Columbia (Canada).
