= Aristotelia amelanchierella =

Scientific classification
- Kingdom: Animalia
- Phylum: Arthropoda
- Clade: Pancrustacea
- Class: Insecta
- Order: Lepidoptera
- Family: Gelechiidae
- Genus: Aristotelia
- Species: A. amelanchierella

Binomial name
- Aristotelia amelanchierella Braun, 1925

Species of moth

Aristotelia amelanchierella is a moth of the family Gelechiidae. It was described by Annette Frances Braun in 1925. It is found in North America, where it has been recorded from Oklahoma, Utah, Washington and West Virginia.

The larvae feed on Amelanchier alnifolia.
