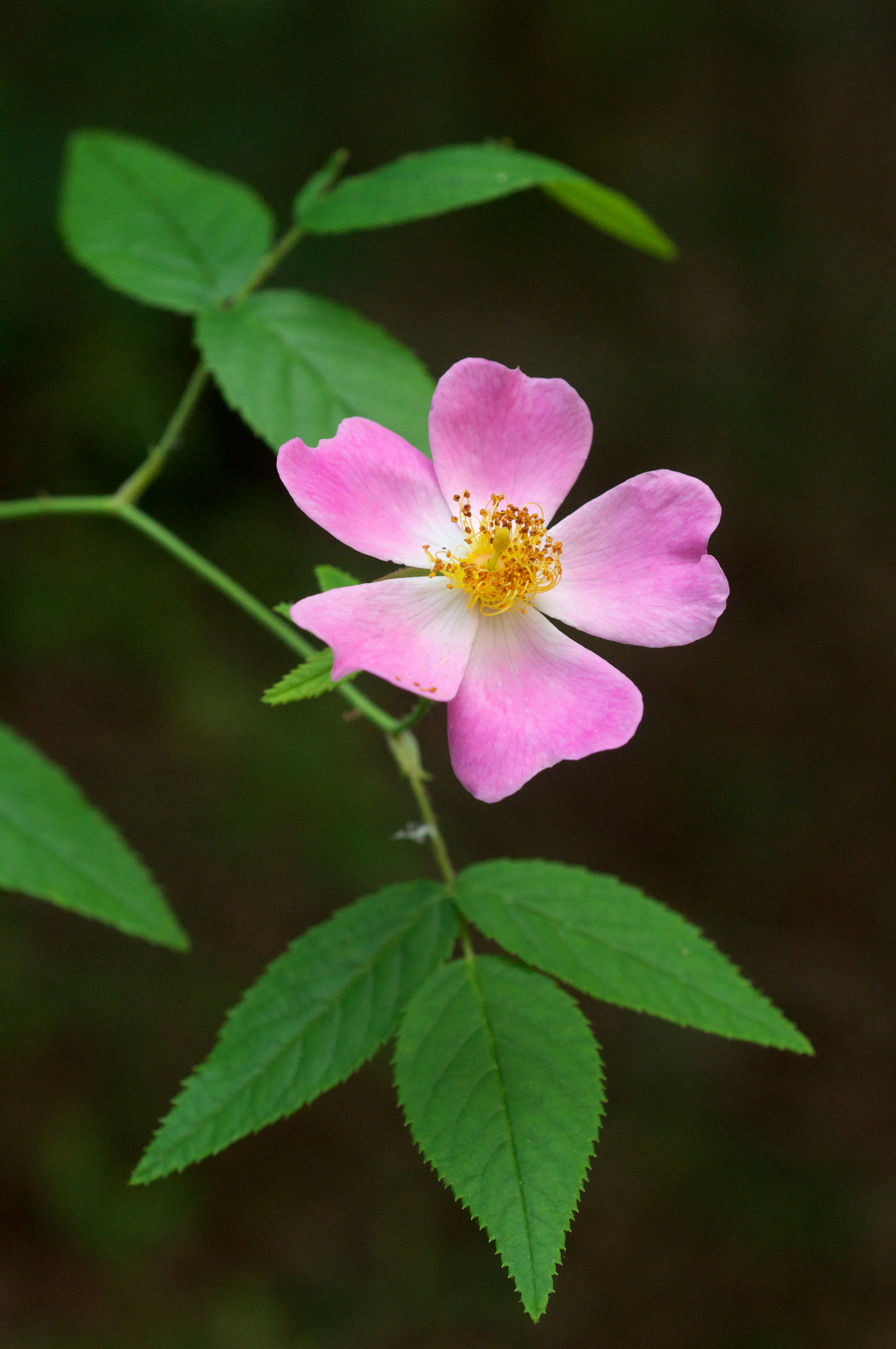

Conservation status
- Secure (NatureServe)

Scientific classification
- Kingdom: Plantae
- Clade: Tracheophytes
- Clade: Angiosperms
- Clade: Eudicots
- Clade: Rosids
- Order: Rosales
- Family: Rosaceae
- Genus: Rosa
- Species: R. setigera

Binomial name
- Rosa setigera Michx.

= Rosa setigera =

Species of shrub

Rosa setigera, commonly known as the climbing rose, prairie rose, and climbing wild rose, is a species of shrub or vine in the Rosaceae (rose) family native to central and eastern North America.

== Description ==
R. setigera has trailing or climbing slender stems that grow up to 5 metres (15 ft) long. The plant grows either as a vine or forms a sprawling thicket. In open areas, the stems will arch downward after reaching a height of about 1 metre (3 ft), and where they touch the ground they will root. In areas with vegetation or other structures, the stems will tend to climb. The stems are green or brown with a reddish tint and have curved prickles.

The leaves are alternate and compound, with 3 to 5 leaflets on each leaf. Each leaf is 8–12 centimetres (3.1–4.7 in) long, with leaflets that are 3–5 centimetres (1.2–2.0 in) long and 1.5–4 centimetres (0.6–1.6 in) wide. Leaflets are ovate, with serrate or doubly serrate margins.

The fragrant flowers, blooming May to July, are usually pink, occasionally white, and appear either singly or in groups, or panicles on stalks. Each flower, measuring about 8 centimetres (3 in) wide, has large petals and many stamens. The fruit appears later in the summer as bright red rose hips.

Setigera's range overlaps with several other Rosa species, as well as some invasives. It can be differentiated from Rosa multiflora by its tendency to have pink flowers. Multiflora only produces white flowers. Their rosehips are fairly comparable. Dog Rose (Rosa canina) can also have small pink flowers, but their rosehips are large and more cylindrical. Rosa setigera can also be differentiated from another native, Rose carolina, by the fact that Carolina tends to grow lower to the ground and has larger flowers and rosehips.

== Distribution and habitat ==
R. setigera is native in the United States from Texas and Nebraska in the west, Wisconsin in the north, New Hampshire in the east, and Florida in the south. It is also native to Ontario and is listed as a species of special concern because of loss of habitat. The plant can be found in areas with average to moist, well-drained soils, including forests and woodlands, roadsides, bluffs, streambanks, old fields, and pastures.

== Ecology ==
The flowers bloom in the spring to summer, with rose hips following later in the summer. Bees pollinate the flowers, and various other insects feed on the plant. Birds and mammals eat the hips. R. setigera is the larval host for several species of moths, including Paleacrita vernata (spring cankerworm), Stigmella rosaefoliella, and Coptotriche roseticola.
