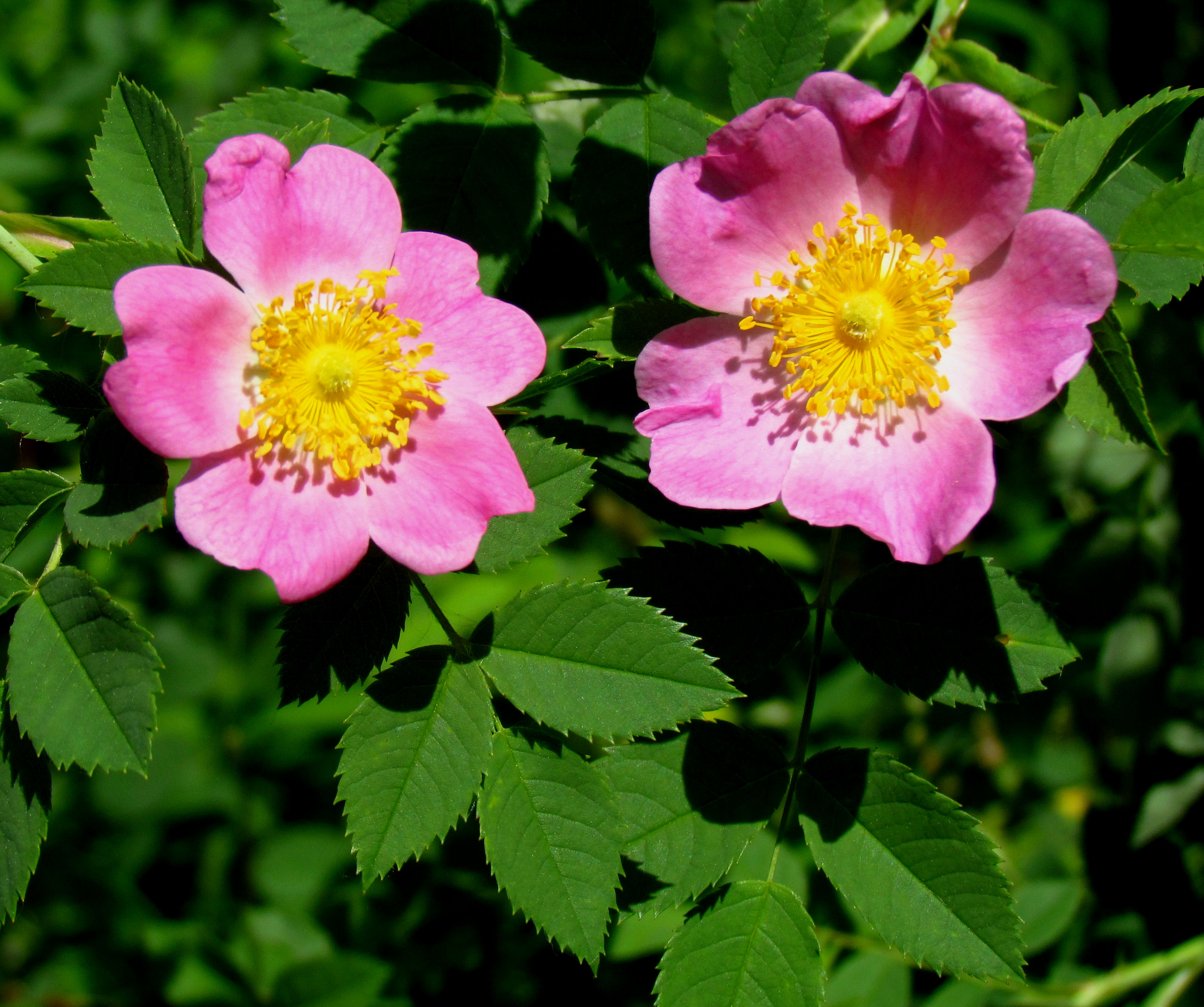
- flowers and leaves

Conservation status
- Secure (NatureServe)

Scientific classification
- Kingdom: Plantae
- Clade: Tracheophytes
- Clade: Angiosperms
- Clade: Eudicots
- Clade: Rosids
- Order: Rosales
- Family: Rosaceae
- Genus: Rosa
- Species: R. carolina

Binomial name
- Rosa carolina L.

= Rosa carolina =

Species of shrub

Rosa carolina, commonly known as the Carolina rose, pasture rose, or prairie rose, is a perennial shrub in the rose family native to eastern North America. It can be found in nearly all US states and Canadian provinces east of the Great Plains. It is common throughout its range and can be found in a wide variety of open habitats, from thickets and open woods to roadsides and along railroads.

== Description ==
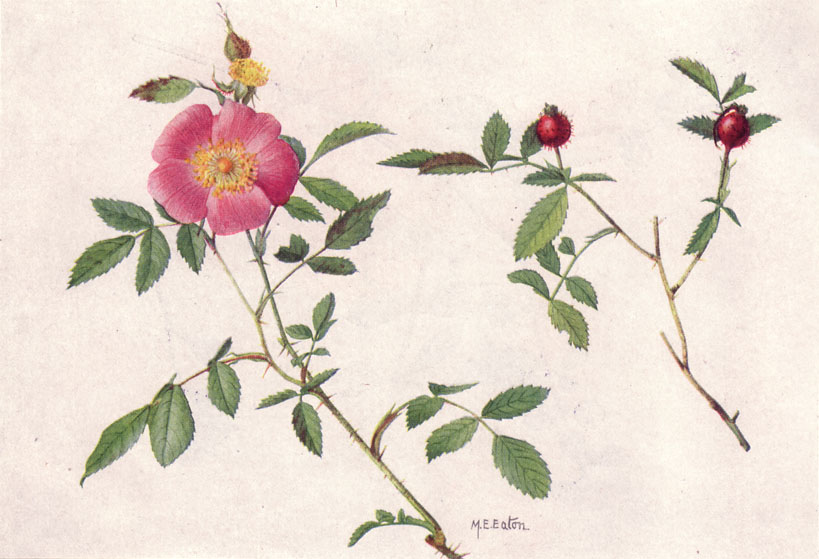
Painting of the Carolina rose by Mary E. Eaton from a 1917 issue of National Geographic

Rosa carolina is a perennial shrub. The stems have straight, needle-like thorns, which distinguishes it from very similar species such as R. palustris and R. virginiana, which have curved thorns. The fragrant flowers emerge in early summer. Blooms are about 6 to 8 centimeters (2.5 to 3 inches) in diameter, with five light pink petals and a yellow center. Flowers are typically borne singly on the ends of the current year's growth. There is no repeat bloom. The stems of the rose are upright, grayish in color on new growth, and brown on larger, older branches. Foliage is smooth and dark green. The plants proliferate by root spread. New growth will eventually become small to large thickets, anywhere from 0.5 to 1 m (18 to 40 inches) in height.

This plant can be differentiated from other species of wild rose by its larger, pink flowers. They bloom later than many other species and for a shorter time. The shrub also tends to stay lower than other wild rose species. Its rosehips are round, large and have protrusions at the opposite end from the stem. Rosa Setigera, on the other hand, has small, round hips similar to Multiflora and can get large, but usually have a mix of pink and white flowers. Rosa Multiflora only has white flowers. Another invasive, Dog Rose, has pink flowers like setigera, but the hips are large and more cylindrical.

== Distribution and habitat ==
The Carolina rose is frequently found in a wide range of habitats, including dry soils, at the border of prairies, woodlands, and savannas, in thickets, in upland forested areas, and dunes. It also grows in wet soils along stream beds, swamps and low grassy areas. It has a wide range, from Nova Scotia, Canada, south to Florida, west to Texas, and north to Ontario.

== Cultivation ==
The Carolina rose can be cultivated. It needs full sun to moderate shade, well-drained soil and regular watering to thrive. The rose hips are edible, although very tart in flavor. The plant is attractive to several species of bees and also provides nesting materials to them.
