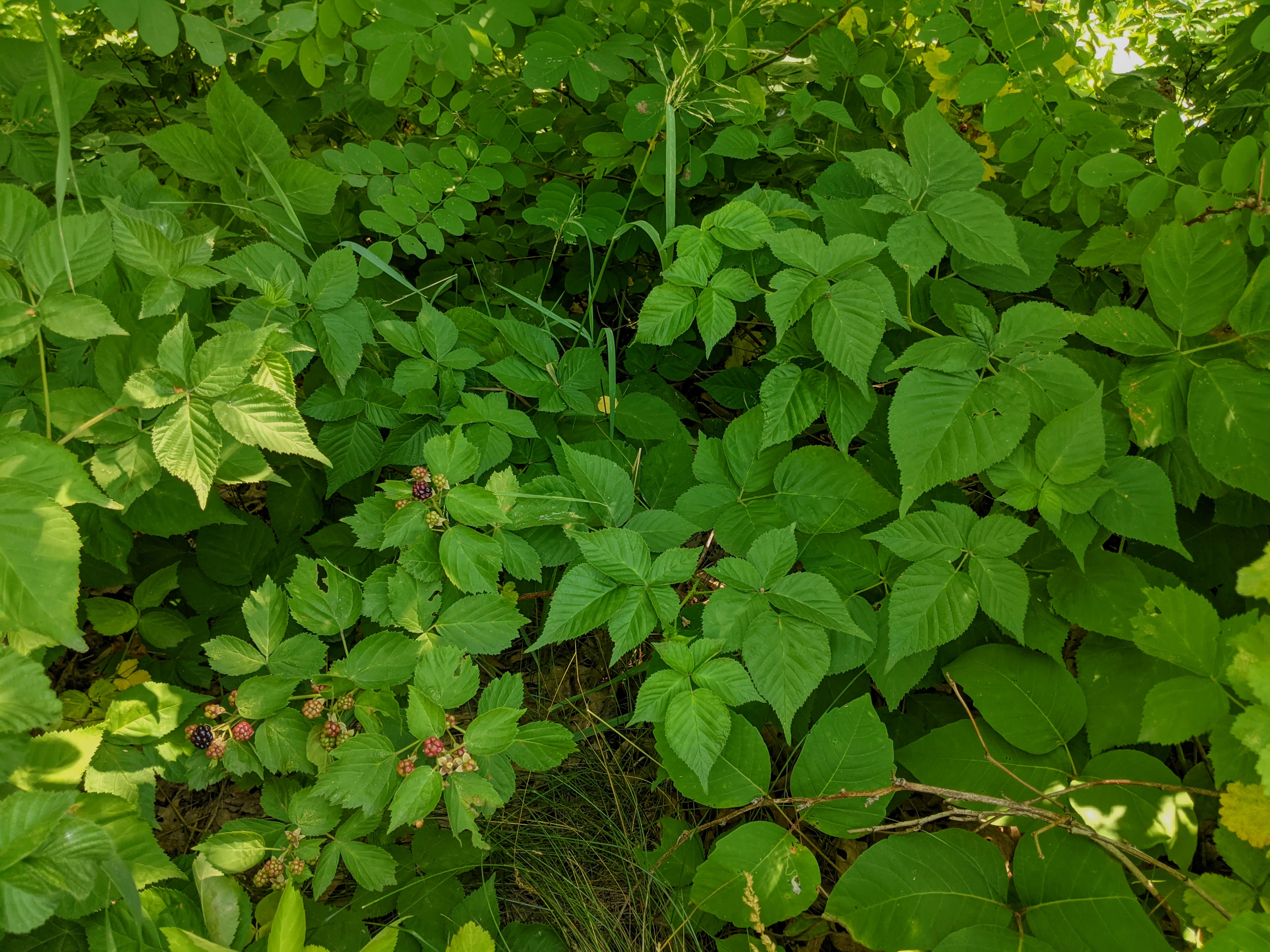

Scientific classification
- Kingdom: Plantae
- Clade: Tracheophytes
- Clade: Angiosperms
- Clade: Eudicots
- Clade: Rosids
- Order: Rosales
- Family: Rosaceae
- Genus: Rubus
- Species: R. frondosus

Binomial name
- Rubus frondosus (Torr.) Bigelow 1824

Synonyms
- Synonymy: Rubus villosus var. frondosus Bigelow ex Torr. 1824; Rubus brainerdii Fernald; Rubus cardianus L.H.Bailey; Rubus difformis L.H.Bailey; Rubus eriensis L.H.Bailey; Rubus folioflorus L.H.Bailey; Rubus heterogeneus L.H.Bailey; Rubus nescius L.H.Bailey; Rubus pauxillus L.H.Bailey; Rubus pensilvanicus var. frondosus (Bigelow ex Torr.) B.Boivin; Rubus pratensis L.H.Bailey; Rubus sativus (L.H.Bailey) Brainerd; Rubus uniquus L.H.Bailey; Rubus wahlii L.H.Bailey

= Rubus frondosus =

Species of fruit and plant

Rubus frondosus is a North American species of blackberry in the genus Rubus, a member of the rose family. It has been found in Ontario and in the eastern and central United States from Maine south to Georgia and west as far as Oklahoma, Nebraska, and Minnesota.
