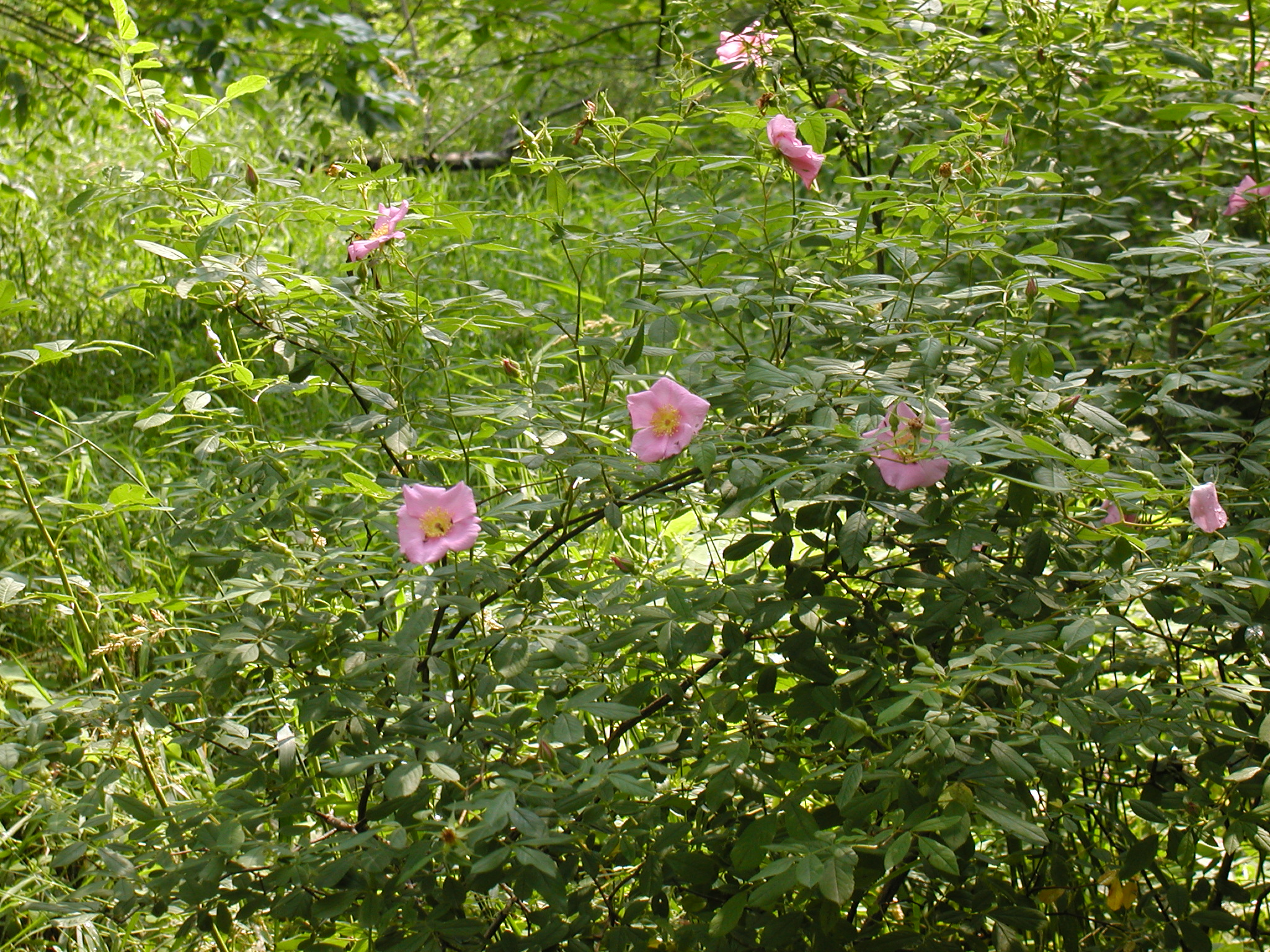
- Flowering branch

Conservation status
- Secure (NatureServe)

Scientific classification
- Kingdom: Plantae
- Clade: Tracheophytes
- Clade: Angiosperms
- Clade: Eudicots
- Clade: Rosids
- Order: Rosales
- Family: Rosaceae
- Genus: Rosa
- Species: R. palustris

Binomial name
- Rosa palustris Marshall

= Rosa palustris =

Species of shrub

Rosa palustris, the swamp rose, is a shrub in the rose family native to much of eastern North America. It can be found from Nova Scotia and New Brunswick in the north, south to Florida and west to Arkansas and Ontario. It is a host of the blinded sphinx moth and Coptotriche admirabilis.

== Description ==
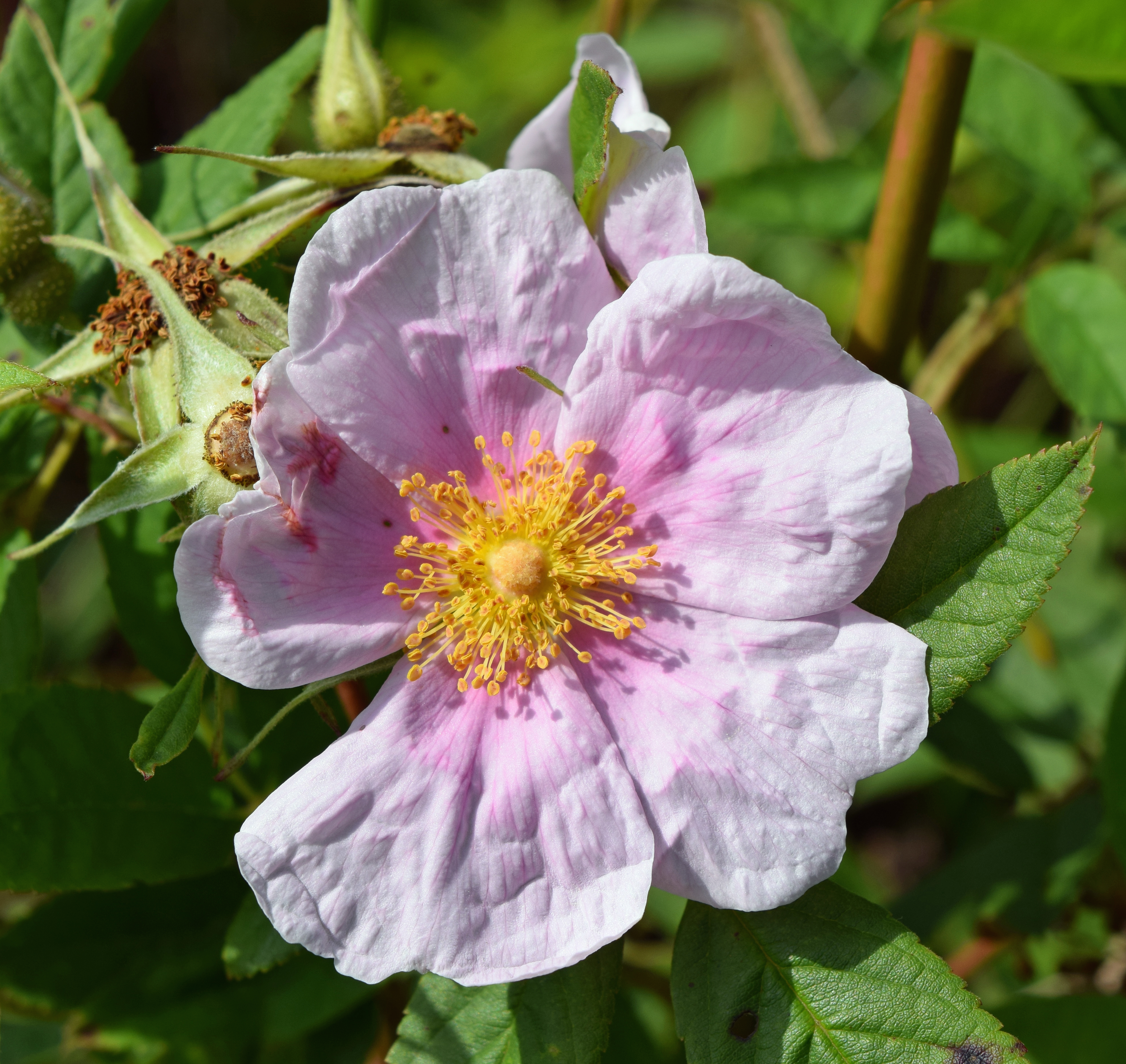
Flowers are pink

Rosa palustris is a shrub with alternate, pinnately compound leaves, on thorny stems. The flowers are pink, borne in summer.

== Etymology ==
The species epithet palustris is Latin for "of the marsh" and indicates its common habitat.
