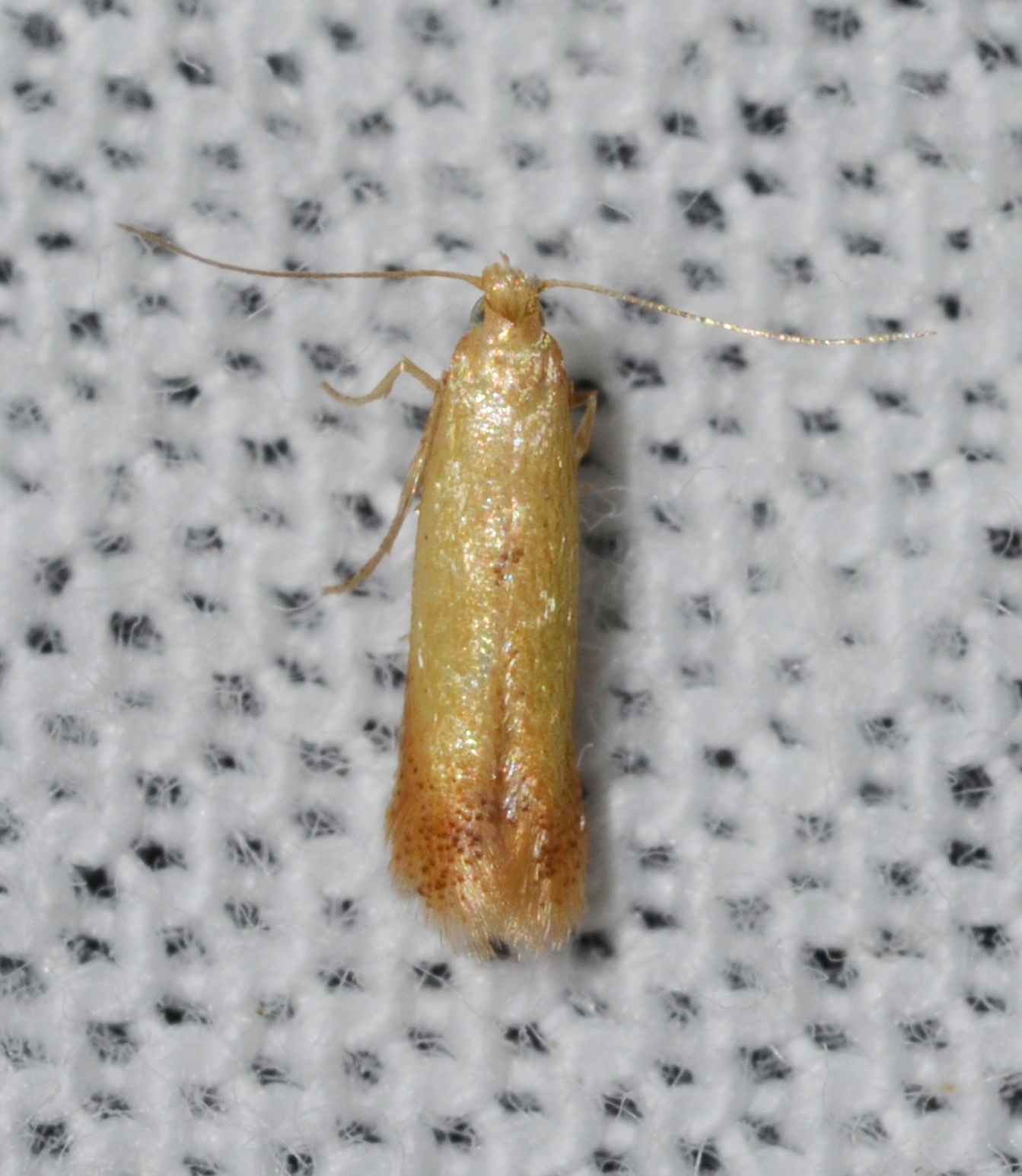
- Coptotriche citrinipennella

Scientific classification
- Domain: Eukaryota
- Kingdom: Animalia
- Phylum: Arthropoda
- Class: Insecta
- Order: Lepidoptera
- Family: Tischeriidae
- Genus: Coptotriche; Walsingham, 1890

Synonyms
- Emmetia Leraut, 1993

= Coptotriche =

Genus of moths

Coptotriche is a genus of moths in the family Tischeriidae, described by the English politician and amateur entomologist, the 6th Baron Walsingham in 1890.

== Species ==
- Coptotriche admirabilis
- Coptotriche aenea
- Coptotriche africana
- Coptotriche agrimoniella
- Coptotriche alavelona
- Coptotriche amelanchieris
- Coptotriche arizonica
- Coptotriche badiiella
- Coptotriche basipectinella
- Coptotriche berberella
- Coptotriche castaneaeella
- Coptotriche citrinipennella
- Coptotriche clemensella
- Coptotriche concolor
- Coptotriche confusa
- Coptotriche consanguinea
- Coptotriche crataegifoliae
- Coptotriche discreta
- Coptotriche distincta
- Coptotriche forsteroniae
- Coptotriche fuscomarginella
- Coptotriche heinemanni
- Coptotriche inexpectata
- Coptotriche insolita
- Coptotriche japoniella
- Coptotriche kenyensis
- Coptotriche longiciliatella
- Coptotriche lucida
- Coptotriche malifoliella
- Coptotriche marginea
- Coptotriche mediostriata
- Coptotriche perplexa
- Coptotriche pulverea
- Coptotriche purinosella
- Coptotriche roseticola
- Coptotriche simulata
- Coptotriche singularis
- Coptotriche splendida
- Coptotriche subnubila
- Coptotriche tantalella
- Coptotriche zelleriella
- Coptotriche zimbabwiensis
