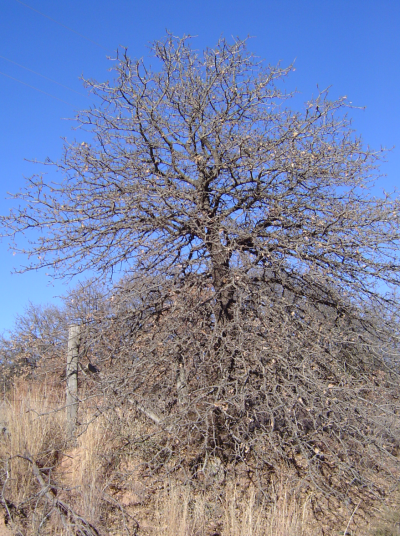
- Dormant blackjack in the Cross Timbers of Lincoln County, Oklahoma

Conservation status
- Least Concern (IUCN 3.1)

- Secure (NatureServe)

Scientific classification
- Kingdom: Plantae
- Clade: Embryophytes
- Clade: Tracheophytes
- Clade: Spermatophytes
- Clade: Angiosperms
- Clade: Eudicots
- Clade: Rosids
- Order: Fagales
- Family: Fagaceae
- Genus: Quercus
- Subgenus: Quercus subg. Quercus
- Section: Quercus sect. Lobatae
- Species: Q. marilandica

Binomial name
- Quercus marilandica Muenchh.
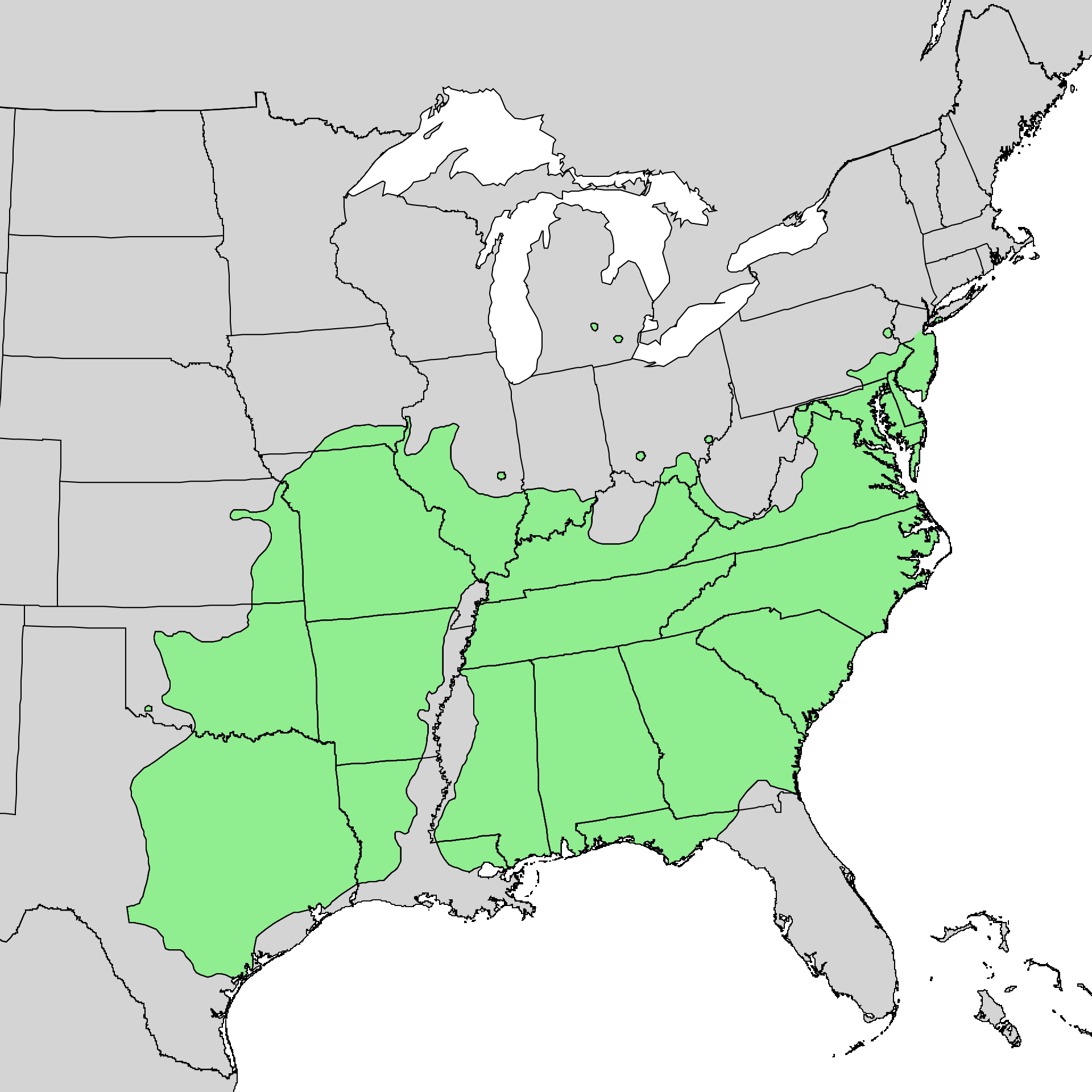
- Generalized natural range of Quercus marilandica

Synonyms
- Quercus cuneata Wangenh.; Quercus dilatata Raf.; Quercus ferruginea F.Michx.; Quercus marilandica var. ashei Sudw.; Quercus neoashei Bush; Quercus nigra var. integrifolia Marshall; Quercus nigra var. marilandica L.; Quercus nigra var. quinqueloba A.DC.; Quercus nobilis Mast.

= Quercus marilandica =

Blackjack oak

Species of oak tree

Quercus marilandica, the blackjack oak, is a small oak, one of the red oak group Quercus sect. Lobatae. It is native to the eastern and central United States.

== Description ==
Quercus marilandica is a small deciduous tree growing to 15 meters (49 feet) tall, with bark cracked into rectangular black plates with narrow orange fissures. The leaves are 7–20 centimeters (3–8 inches) long and broad, and typically flare from a tapered base to a broad three-lobed bell shape with only shallow indentations. They are dark green and glossy above, pubescent underneath, and often remain attached to the twigs through the winter after turning colors from red to brown in the fall. The acorn is small, 12–20 millimeters (1/2–3/4 in) long and 10–18 mm (3/8–3/4 in) broad; like those of other red oaks, it takes 18 months to mature.

Blackjack oaks in the Cross Timbers can grow from 15 to 18 m (50 to 60 ft) high but seldom reach more than 12 m (40 ft), with a trunk diameter of 41 cm (16 in). The leaves are from 10 to 25 cm (4 to 10 in) in length and about the same width.

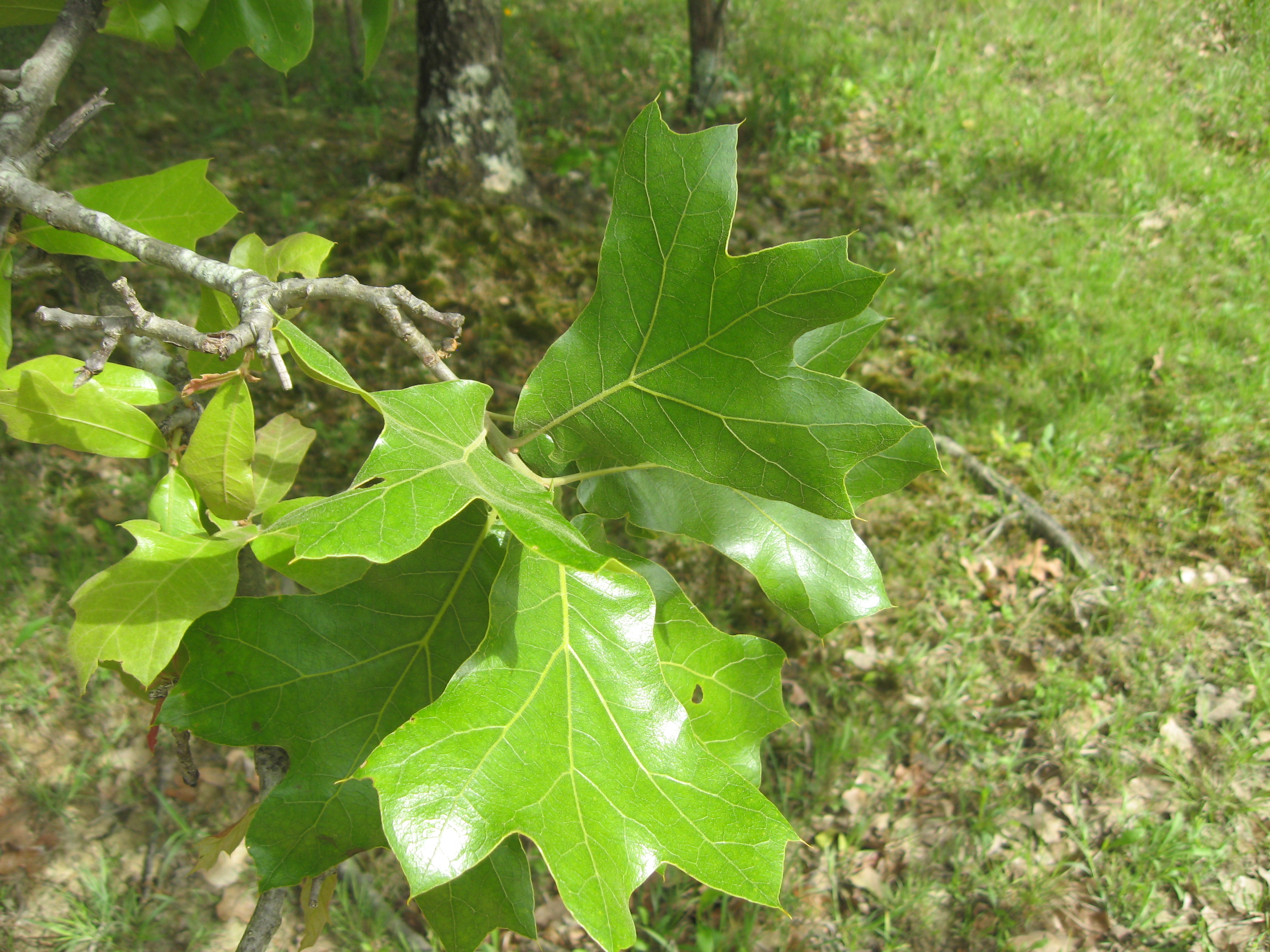
Blackjack oak leaves

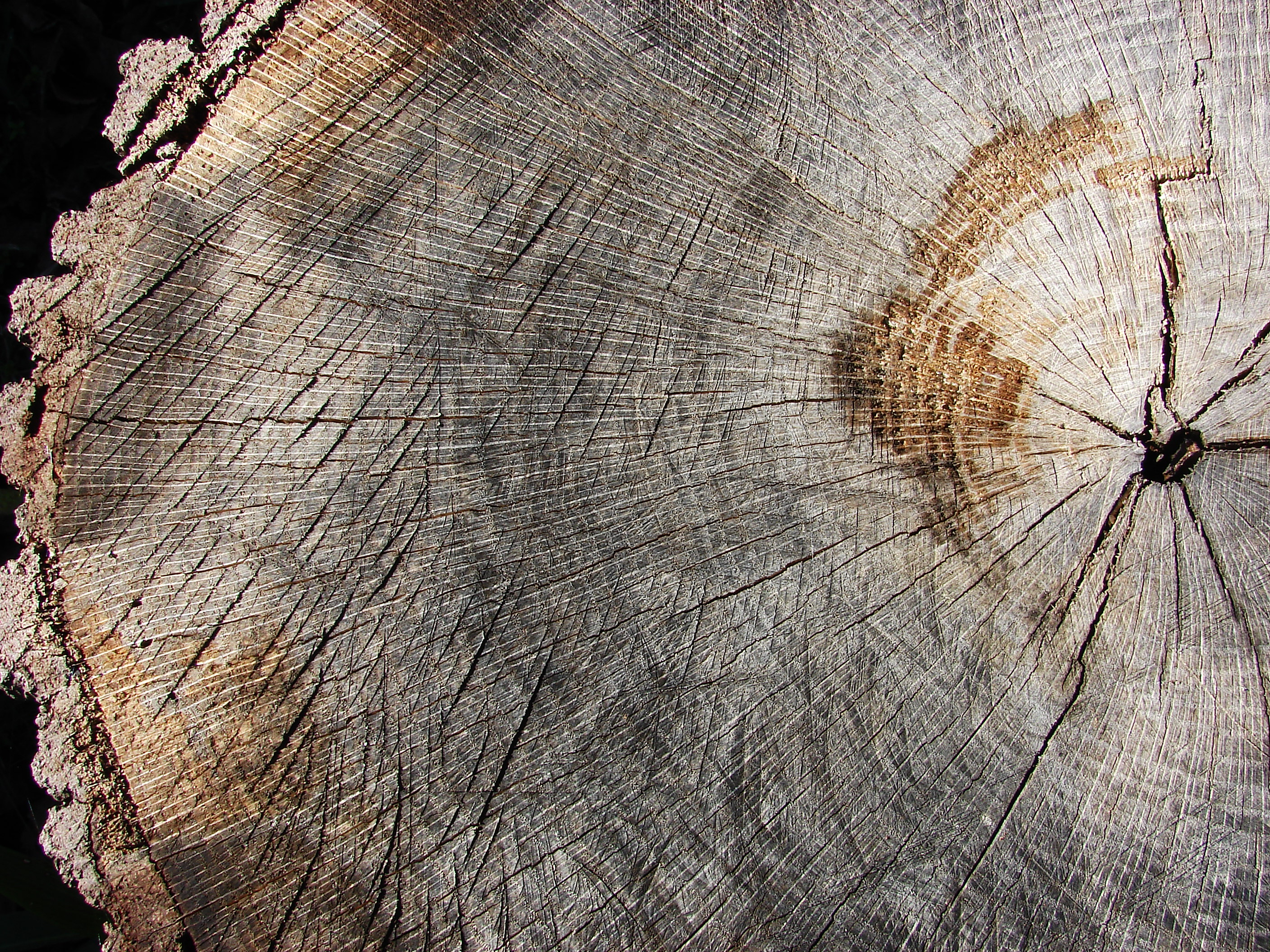
Blackjack oak stump, approx. 75 years old

== Distribution and habitat ==
The blackjack oak can be found from Long Island in New York to Florida, west as far as Texas, Oklahoma, and Nebraska. There are reports of a few isolated populations in southern Michigan, but these appear to represent introductions.

The species grows in poor, thin, dry, rocky or sandy soils where few other woody plants can thrive, usually on low ground, from sea level up to approximately 850 m (2,800 ft) in altitude. Some sources say that it does not have the beautiful form of many oaks, but is nonetheless a valuable tree for growing in problem sites. Some say that the tree is "tough but ugly", but also underappreciated. At times the tree has even been actively eradicated to provide room for trees deemed to be more commercially valuable.

It is sometimes an understory tree in pine stands on sandy knolls in the southeastern US. Along the coastal plain of New Jersey the probability of finding this species is increased in relatively sunny, open areas such as those near coastal salt marshes. It often occurs near scarlet and post oaks as well as pitch pine; understory companions include winged sumac, bracken, sweetfern, and bayberry, and can be found as far north as parts of Ohio and New York.

A variety, Quercus marilandica Münchhausen var. ashei Sudworth, grows in the western portions of its range – northern Texas, Oklahoma, and into southern Kansas. In this area, blackjack and post oak form a semi-savanna area composed of forested strips intermixed with prairie grass glades along the eastern edge of the southern Great Plains. This semi-savanna is known as the Cross Timbers. Scrub forms of Q. marilandica dominate on many chert glades along with Q. stellata in Arkansas's Ozark plateau.

== Ecology ==
Blackjack oak sometimes hybridizes with bear oak (Q. ilicifolia), forming a hybrid known as Q. × brittonii.

Blackjack acorns provide food for both whitetail deer and wild turkey. Blackjacks may, however, cause tannic acid poisoning in cattle.

== Uses ==
The wood is very dense and produces a hot flame when burned, which functions as an excellent source of heat for barbecues and wood-burning stoves. However, the wood is not desirable for wood fireplaces because the heat causes popping, thereby increasing the risk of house fires.

Traditionally blackjack wood is used as both a fuel and smoke wood for barbecue in Oklahoma.
