= Annette Braun =

American entomologist (1884–1978)

- Born: Annette Frances Braun; August 24, 1884; Cincinnati, Ohio, U.S.
- Died: November 27, 1978 (aged 94); Cincinnati, Ohio, U.S.
- Education: University of Cincinnati
- Known for: microlepidoptera
- Scientific career
- Fields: entomology

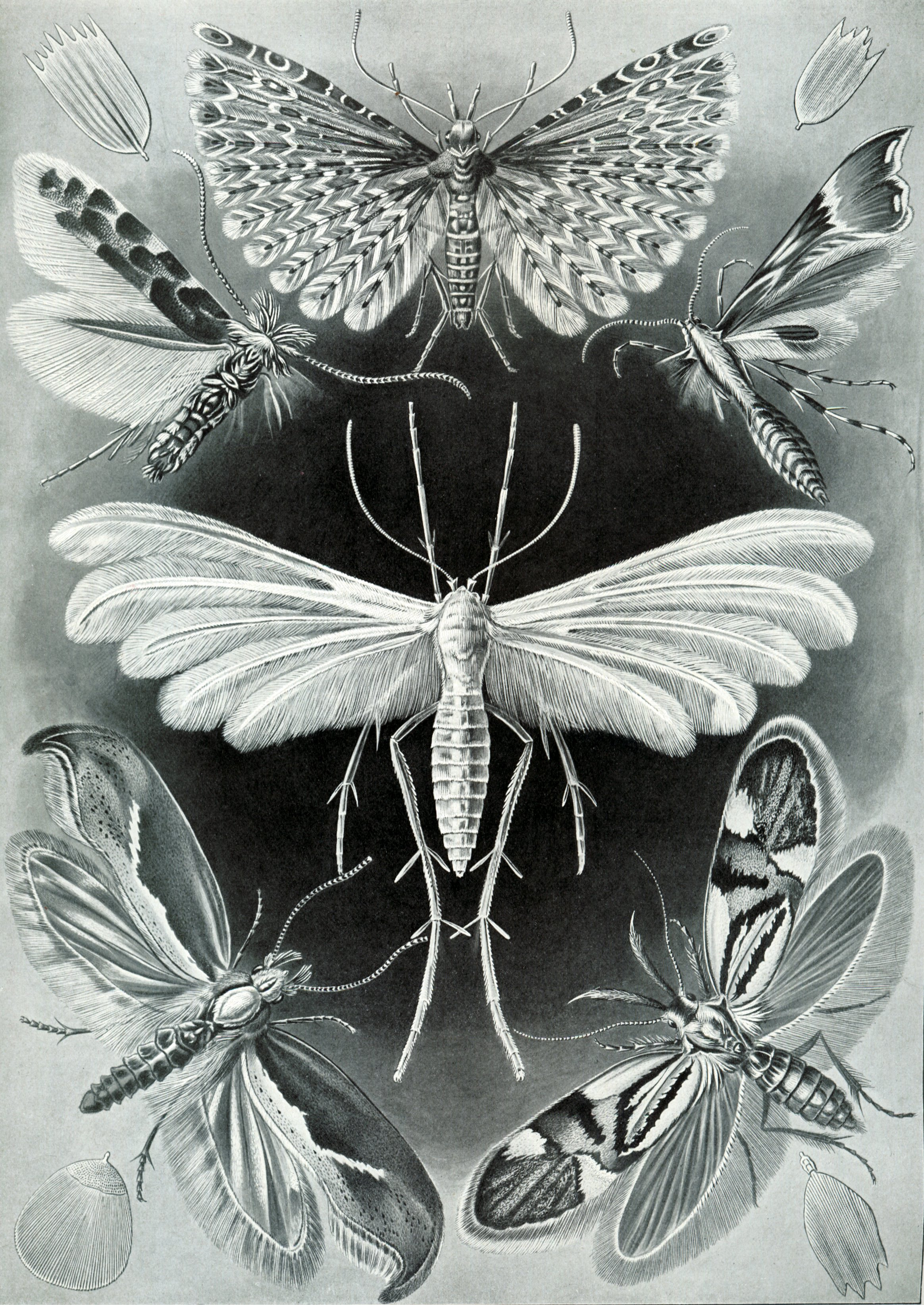
Some typical microlepidoptera: an alucitid many-plumed moth in the top center; a white pterophorid plume moth in the center.

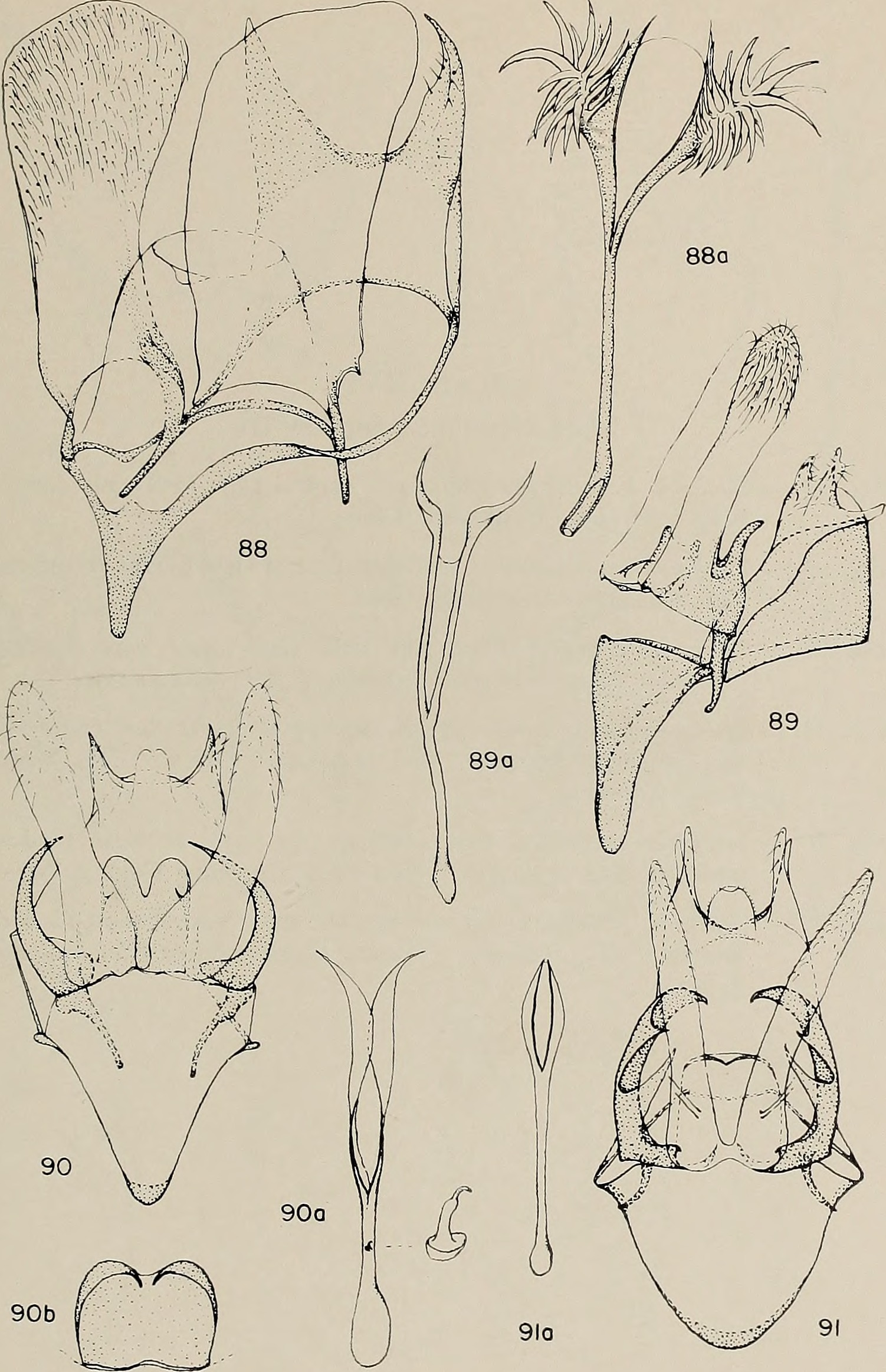
Details of male moth genitalia, Plate 15 from a monograph by Annette Frances Braun on the moth family Tischeriidae.

Annette Frances Braun (August 24, 1884 – November 27, 1978) was an American entomologist and leading authority on microlepidoptera, a grouping of mostly small and nocturnal moths. Her special interest was leaf miners: moths whose larvae live and feed from within a leaf.

== Early life and education ==
Braun was born on August 24, 1884, to George F. and Emma Maria (Wright) Braun in Cincinnati, Ohio. She got her education at the University of Cincinnati, receiving her A.B. in 1906, her A.M. in 1908, and her Ph.D. in 1911, making her the first woman to earn a Ph.D. from the University of Cincinnati; her younger sister Emma Lucy Braun would be the third.

== Career ==
Braun began her career as a zoology teaching assistant at the University of Cincinnati (1911–1919) before turning to private research. She developed expertise in the moths of the eastern North American forests, becoming an international authority who has been described as one of the most accomplished lepidopterists of the 20th century. She described and named over 340 species in her lifetime and published four major monographs and dozens of papers on moths. A skilled artist with pen and ink, she often illustrated her work with detailed anatomical drawings made from her own field observations and microscope studies. Braun had specimens of over 30,000 microlepidoptera, which for years was the country's second-largest moth collection.

Braun lived in Mount Washington, a suburb of Cincinnati, with her sister Emma, who was a noted botanist. Part of their garden was used as an outdoor entomological and botanical laboratory, and the sisters often took field trips together.

Starting in the 1910s, they walked, rode horses and trains and (later) drove hundreds of miles through the forests of eastern North America – especially Ohio, Kentucky, and Tennessee – in search of plant and moth specimens. They were dedicated conservationists, and Braun is remembered for her efforts to preserve natural areas in Adams County, Ohio.

Braun served as vice-president of the Entomological Society of America (1926). She was also a trustee of the Cincinnati Museum of Natural History.

Braun continued working and publishing into her eighties. She died on November 27, 1978, at the age of 94.

== Legacy ==
Species named after Braun include Argyresthia annettella and Glyphipterix brauni.

"Annette's Rock" is a trailside landmark named after Braun on the Lynx Prairie nature reserve in Ohio.

Braun's works are archived at several different institutions. The Annette and E. Lucy Braun Papers are held by the Cincinnati History Library and Archives, which is part of the Cincinnati Museum Center. The Smithsonian Institution holds an archive that includes some 5000 of Braun's slides. The Academy of Natural Sciences of Philadelphia houses her collection of 30,000 moth specimens. A number of the leaf mining moth specimens have associated preserved botanical specimens, which are also housed at the Academy of Natural Sciences of Philadelphia.

== Selected publications ==
=== Monographs ===
- Evolution of the Color Pattern in the Microlepidopterous Genus Lithocolletis, 1914
- Elachistidae of North America (Microlepidoptera), 1948
- Tischeriidae of America North of Mexico, 1972
- "The Genus Bucculatrix in America North of Mexico (Microlepidoptera)", 1963

=== Other writings ===
- "Revision of the North American species of the genus Lithocolletis Hübner," 1908
- "The Frenulum and Its Retinaculum in the Lepidoptera," 1924

== See also ==
- Category:Taxa named by Annette Frances Braun
