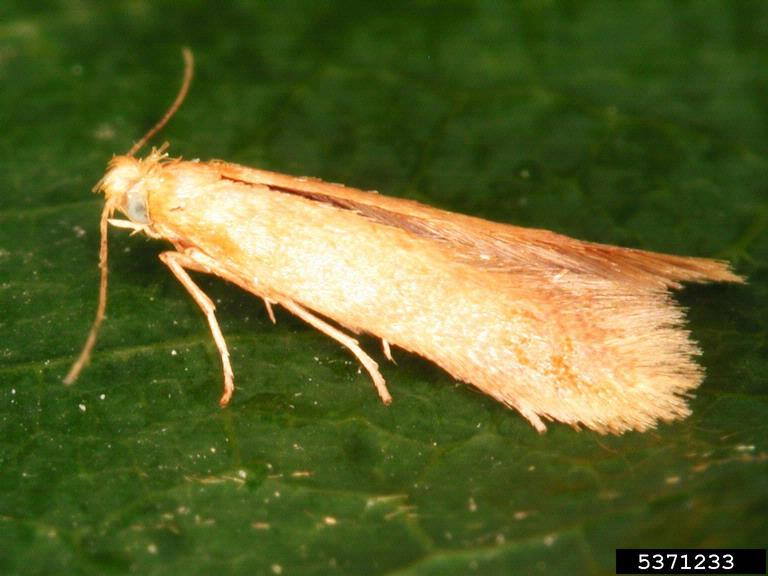
- Tischeria ekebladell

Scientific classification
- Domain: Eukaryota
- Kingdom: Animalia
- Phylum: Arthropoda
- Class: Insecta
- Order: Lepidoptera
- Clade: Eulepidoptera
- Clade: Etimonotrysia
- Superfamily: Tischerioidea
- Family: Tischeriidae; Spuler, 1898

Genera
- Tischeria Zeller, 1839; Coptotriche Walsingham, 1890; Astrotischeria Puplesis & Diskus, 2003

Diversity
- About 3 genera and 110 species

= Tischerioidea =

Superfamily of moths

Tischerioidea is the superfamily of "trumpet" leaf miner moths. The superfamily contains just one family, Tischeriidae, and traditionally one genus, Tischeria, but currently three genera are recognised, widespread around the world including South America (Davis, 1986), except for Australasia (Puplesis and Diskus, 2003). This is one candidate as the sister group (see also Palaephatoidea) of the bulk of Lepidoptera, the Ditrysia (Davis, 1999; Wiegmann et al., 2002), and they have a monotrysian type of female reproductive system. These small moths are leaf-miners in the caterpillar stage, feeding mainly on Fagaceae (Tischeria and Coptotriche), Asteraceae, and Malvaceae (Astrotischeria), and some also on Rhamnaceae, Tiliaceae, and Rosaceae.

== Sources ==
- Firefly Encyclopedia of Insects and Spiders, edited by Christopher O'Toole, ISBN 1-55297-612-2, 2002
