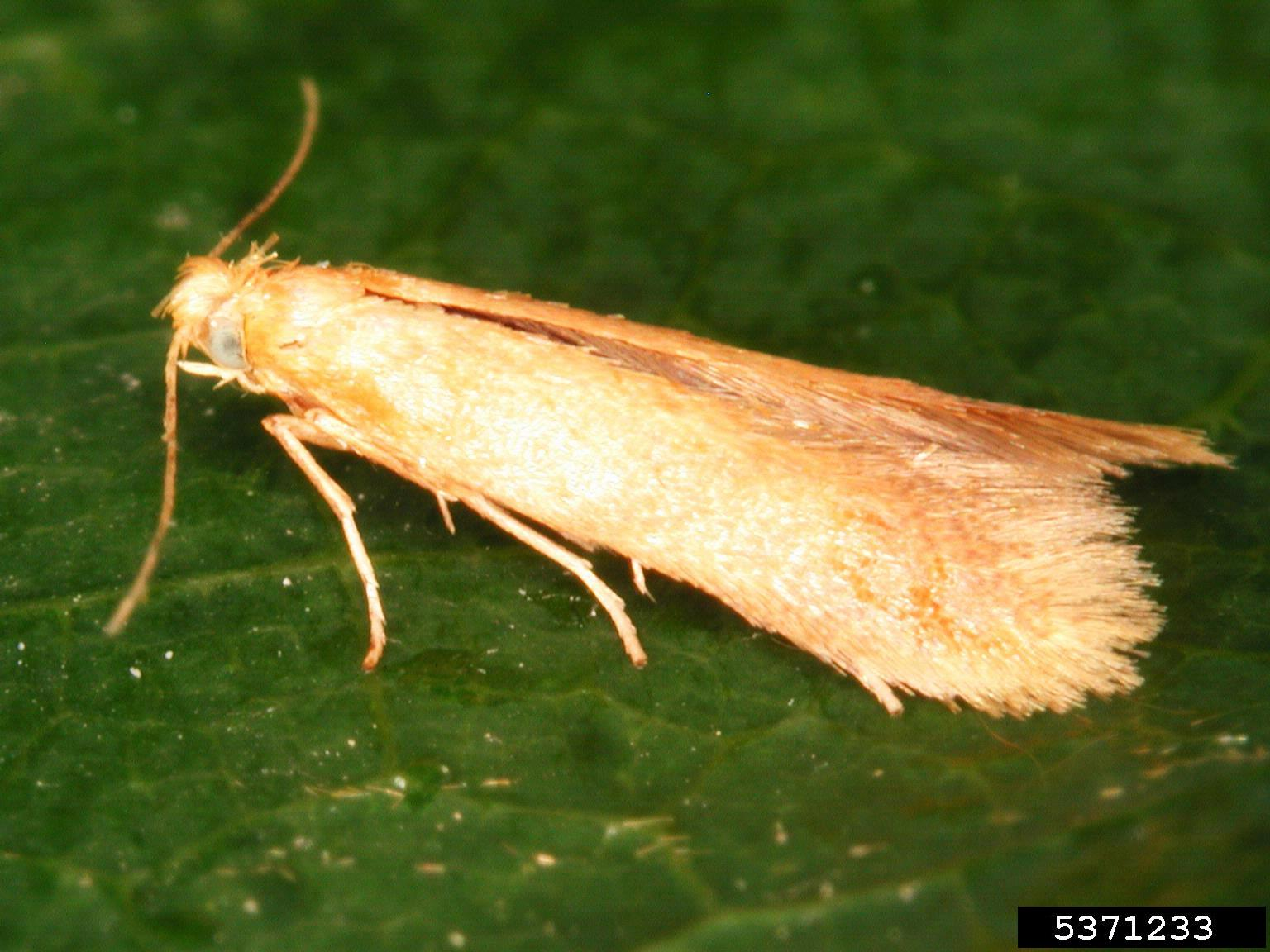
- Tischeria ekebladella

Scientific classification
- Kingdom: Animalia
- Phylum: Arthropoda
- Clade: Pancrustacea
- Class: Insecta
- Order: Lepidoptera
- Family: Tischeriidae
- Genus: Tischeria; Zeller, 1839

Type species
- Tinea complanella Hübner, 1817

Synonyms
- Evexia Gistl, 1847; Philodoxa Gistl, 1848; Tisheria

= Tischeria =

Genus of moths

Tischeria is a genus of moths in the family Tischeriidae. The genus Coptotriche was long treated as a synonym of Tischeria, but is now considered distinct.

== Selected species ==
- Tischeria ambigua Braun, 1915
- Tischeria antilope Puplesis, Diškus and Mey, 2003
- Tischeria bifurcata Braun, 1915
- Tischeria ceanothi Walsingham, 1890
- Tischeria decidua Wocke, 1876
- Tischeria deliquescens Meyrick, 1915
- Tischeria dodonaea Stainton, 1858
- Tischeria ekebladella Bjerkander, 1795
- Tischeria ekebladioides Puplesis & Diskus, 2003
- Tischeria elongata Walsingham, 1914
- Tischeria gouaniae Stonis & Diškus, 2007
- Tischeria martinkrugeri Puplesis and Diškus, 2003
- Tischeria pulvella Chambers, 1878
- Tischeria quercitella Clemens, 1863
- Tischeria sparmanniae Puplesis and Diškus, 2003
- Tischeria unicolor Walsingham, 1897
- Tischeria urticicolella Ghesquière, 1940
- Tischeria zestica Meyrick, 1911

== Former species ==
- Tischeria admirabilis Braun, 1972
- Tischeria aenea Frey & Boll, 1872
- Tischeria agrimoniella Braun, 1972
- Tischeria ambrosiaeella Chambers, 1875
- Tischeria amelanchieris Braun, 1972
- Tischeria angusticolella Duponchel, 1843
- Tischeria arizonica Braun, 1972
- Tischeria astericola Braun, 1972
- Tischeria badiiella Chambers, 1875
- Tischeria castaneaeella Chambers, 1875
- Tischeria citrinipennella Clemens, 1859
- Tischeria clemensella Chambers, 1878
- Tischeria concolor Zeller, 1875
- Tischeria confusa Braun, 1972
- Tischeria consanguinea Braun, 1972
- Tischeria crataegifoliae Braun, 1972
- Tischeria discreta Braun, 1972
- Tischeria distincta Braun, 1972
- Tischeria explosa Braun, 1923
- Tischeria fuscomarginella Chambers, 1875
- Tischeria gaunacella Duponchel, 1843
- Tischeria gregaria Braun, 1972
- Tischeria helianthi Frey & Boll, 1878
- Tischeria heliopsisella Chambers, 1875
- Tischeria heteroterae Frey & Boll, 1878
- Tischeria inexpectata Braun, 1972
- Tischeria insolita Braun, 1972
- Tischeria longeciliata Frey & Boll, 1878
- Tischeria longispicula Puplesis, 1988
- Tischeria lucida Braun, 1972
- Tischeria malifoliella Clemens, 1860
- Tischeria marginata Braun, 1972
- Tischeria marginea Haworth, 1928
- Tischeria mediostriata Braun, 1927
- Tischeria occidentalis Braun, 1972
- Tischeria omissa Braun, 1927
- Tischeria pallidipennella Braun, 1972
- Tischeria purinosella Chambers, 1875
- Tischeria rosella Gerasimov, 1937
- Tischeria roseticola Frey & Boll, 1873
- Tischeria simulata Braun, 1972
- Tischeria solidagonifoliella Clemens, 1859
- Tischeria splendida Braun, 1972
- Tischeria subnubila Braun, 1972
- Tischeria sulphurea Frey & Boll, 1878
- Tischeria zelleriella Clemens, 1859
