= Tischeria ambigua =

Scientific classification
- Kingdom: Animalia
- Phylum: Arthropoda
- Class: Insecta
- Order: Lepidoptera
- Family: Tischeriidae
- Genus: Tischeria
- Species: T. ambigua

Binomial name
- Tischeria ambigua Braun, 1915

Species of moth

Tischeria ambigua is a moth of the family Tischeriidae. It is known from California, United States.

The larvae feed on Ceanothus oliganthus. They mine the leaves of their host plant.
