= Tischeria martinkrugeri =

Scientific classification
- Domain: Eukaryota
- Kingdom: Animalia
- Phylum: Arthropoda
- Class: Insecta
- Order: Lepidoptera
- Family: Tischeriidae
- Genus: Tischeria
- Species: T. martinkrugeri

Binomial name
- Tischeria martinkrugeri Puplesis and Diškus, 2003

Species of moth

Tischeria martinkrugeri is a moth of the family Tischeriidae. It is known from South Africa.
