= Tischeria urticicolella =

Scientific classification
- Kingdom: Animalia
- Phylum: Arthropoda
- Class: Insecta
- Order: Lepidoptera
- Family: Tischeriidae
- Genus: Tischeria
- Species: T. urticicolella

Binomial name
- Tischeria urticicolella (Ghesquière, 1940)

Synonyms
- Lithocolletis urticicolella Ghesquière, 1940; Phyllonorycter urticicolella

Species of moth

Tischeria urticicolella is a moth of the family Tischeriidae. It is known from the Democratic Republic of Congo.

The larvae feed on Laportea podocarpa. They probably mine the leaves of their host plant.
