= Tischeria gouaniae =

Scientific classification
- Kingdom: Animalia
- Phylum: Arthropoda
- Clade: Pancrustacea
- Class: Insecta
- Order: Lepidoptera
- Family: Tischeriidae
- Genus: Tischeria
- Species: T. gouaniae

Binomial name
- Tischeria gouaniae Stonis & Diškus, 2007

Species of moth

Tischeria gouaniae is a moth of the family Tischeriidae. It is known from Belize.

The wingspan is 5-5.2 mm.

The larvae feed on Gouania polygama. They mine the leaves of their host plant. The mine has the form of a linear mine.
