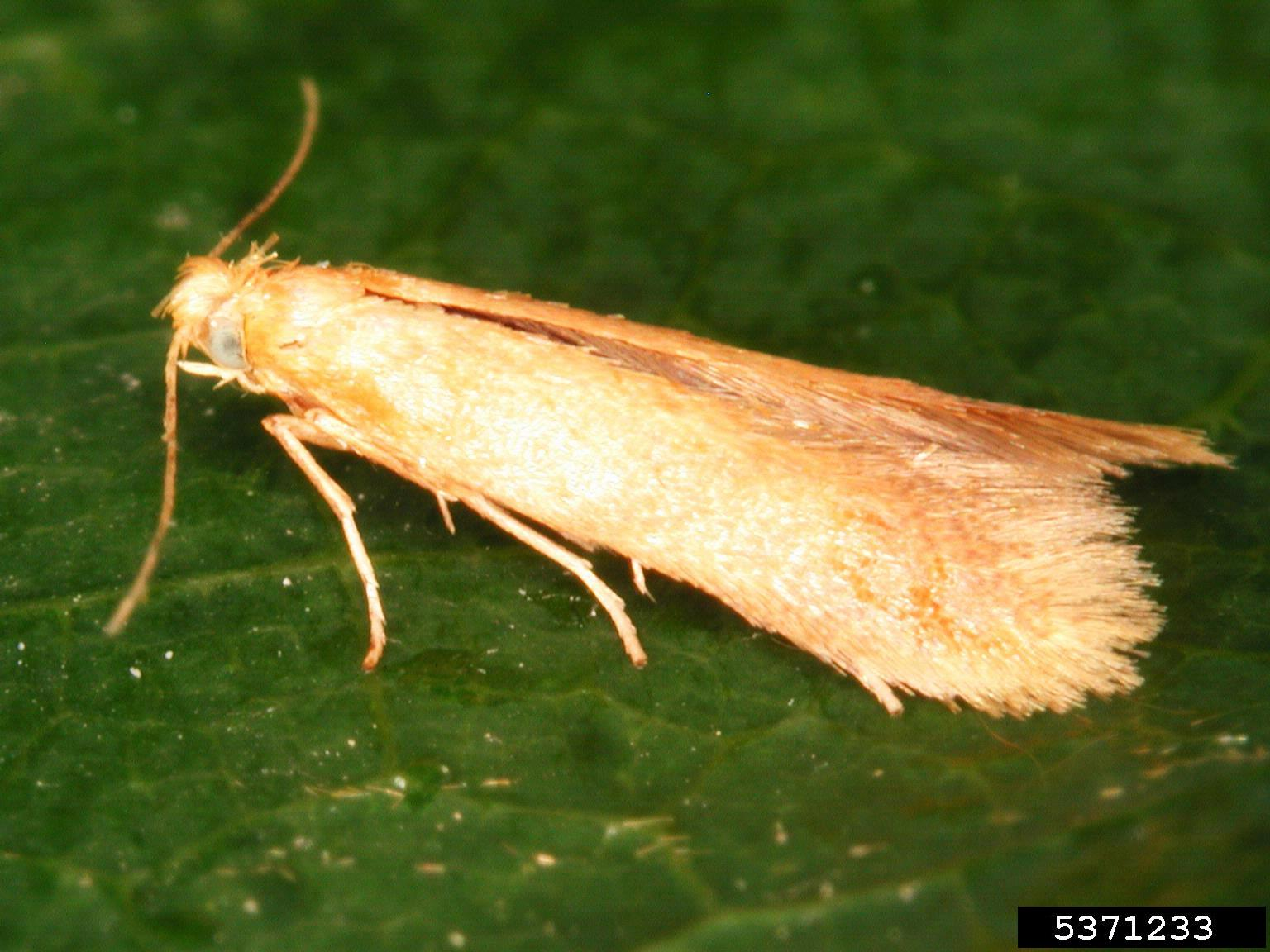

Scientific classification
- Domain: Eukaryota
- Kingdom: Animalia
- Phylum: Arthropoda
- Class: Insecta
- Order: Lepidoptera
- Family: Tischeriidae
- Genus: Tischeria
- Species: T. ekebladella

Binomial name
- Tischeria ekebladella (Bjerkander, 1795)

Synonyms
- Phalaena ekebladella Bjerkander, 1795; Tinea complanella Hubner, 1817; Tischeria complanella; Porrectaria rufipennis Haworth, 1828; Aphelosetia rufipennella Stephens, 1834; Aphelosetia fulvescens Stephens, 1834; Tinea ricciardella Costa, 1836

= Tischeria ekebladella =

Species of moth

Tischeria ekebladella is a moth of the family Tischeriidae. It is found in most of Europe and the Caucasus.

The wingspan is 8–11 mm. The forewings are deep ochreous yellow, suffusedly irrorated with fuscous towards the costa posteriorly and apex. Hindwings rather dark grey. Closely resembles Tischeria dodonea. Certain identification requires examination of a genitalia preparation.

Adults are on wing from May to June depending on the location.

The larvae feed on Castanea mollissima, C. sativa, Quercus cerris, Q. dalechampii, Q. faginea, Q. frainetto, Q. macranthera, Q. macrocarpa, Q. macrolepis, Q. pedunculiflora, Q. petraea, Q. pubescens, Q. robur, Q. rubra and Q. serrata × turneri. They mine the leaves of their host plant.

== Gallery ==
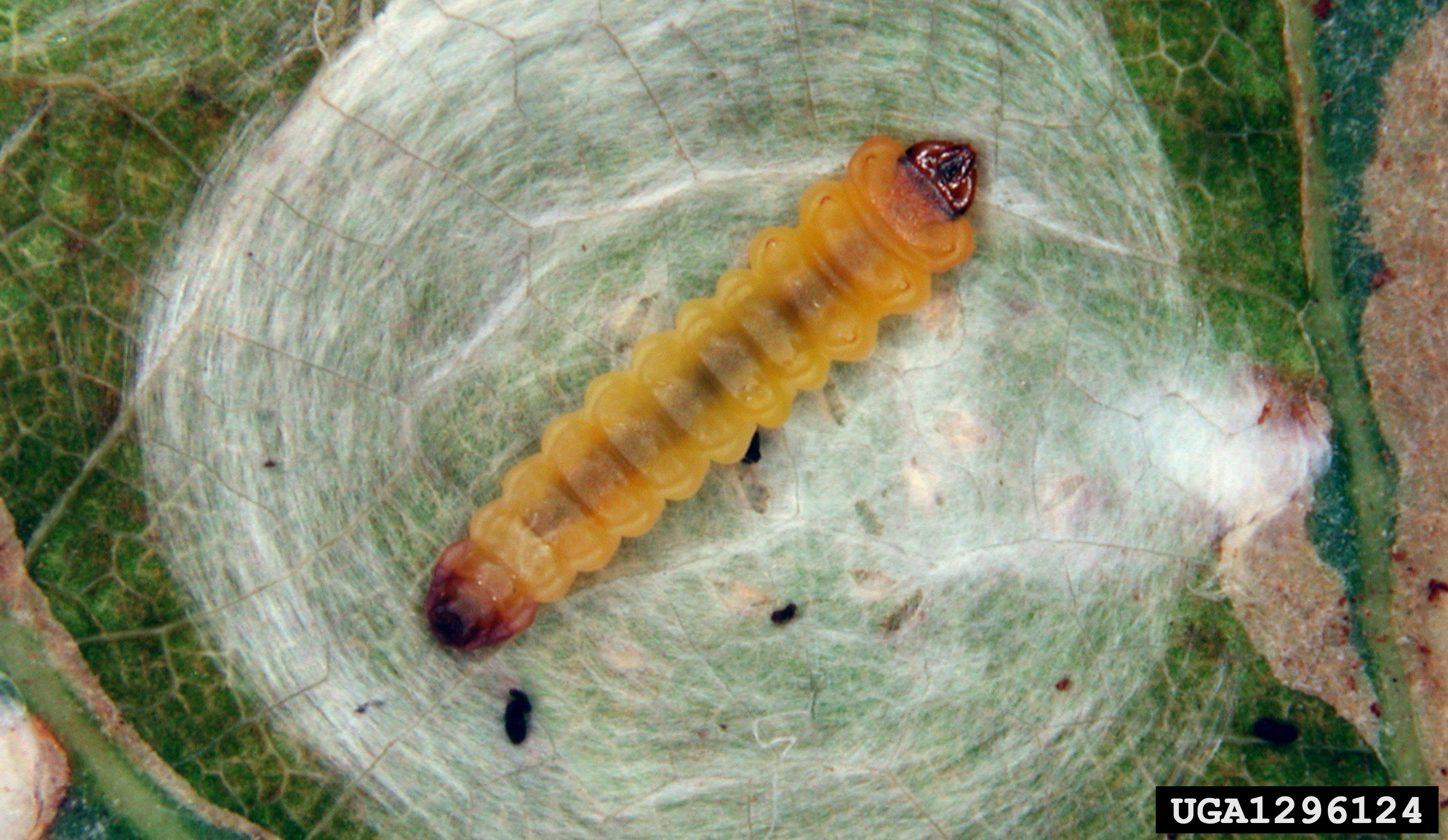
Larva

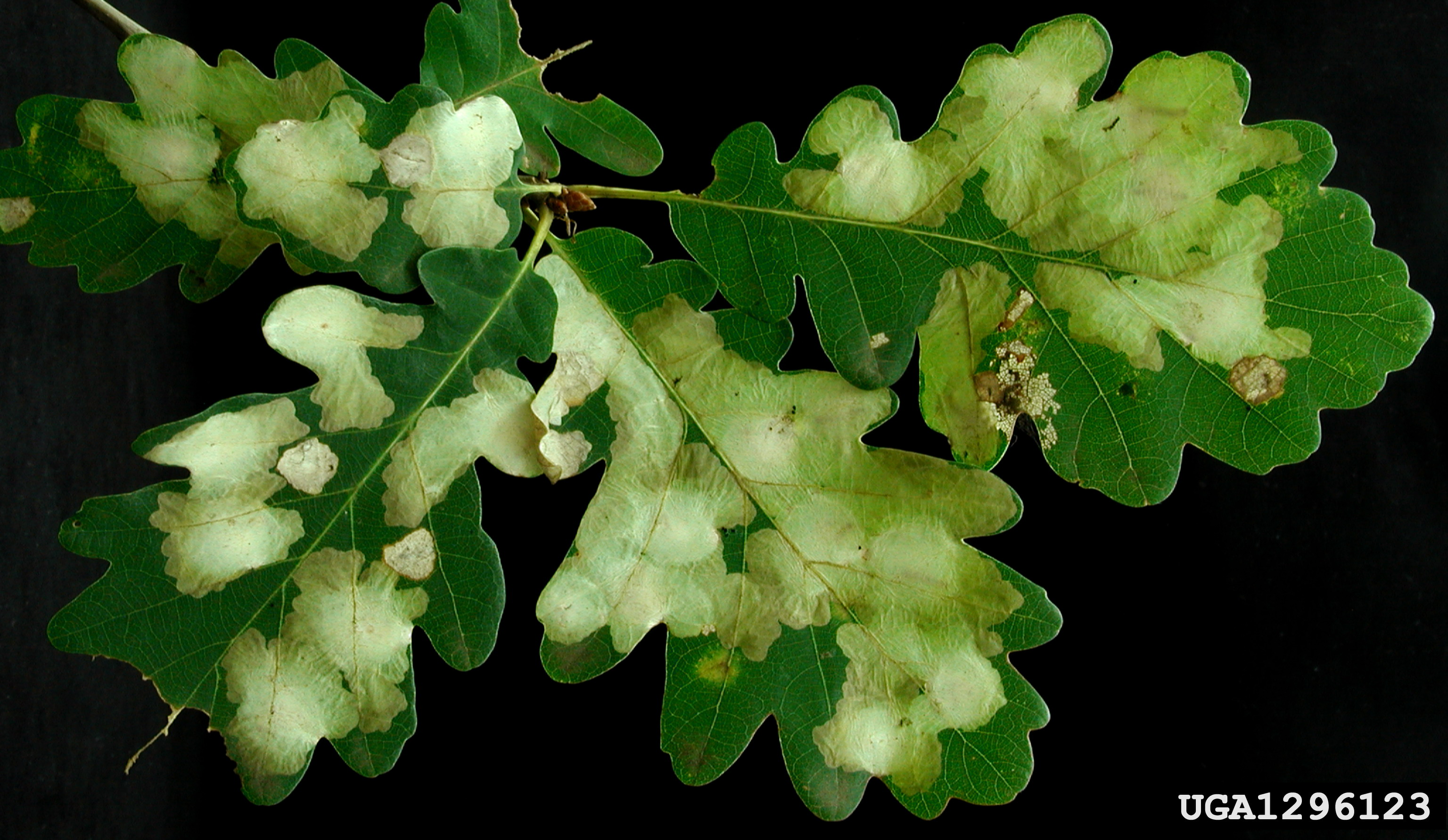
Leaf mine on Quercus robur
