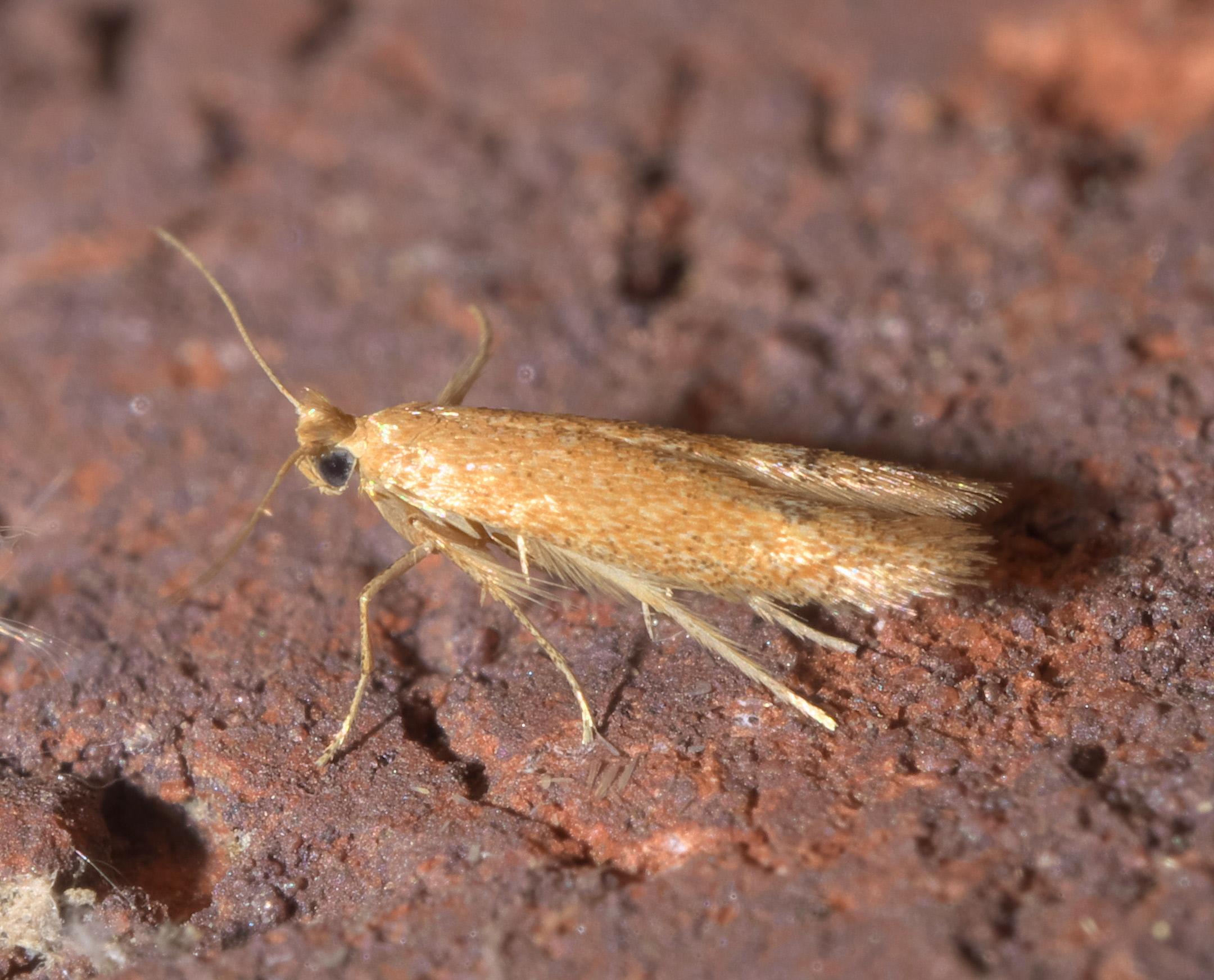
- Adult
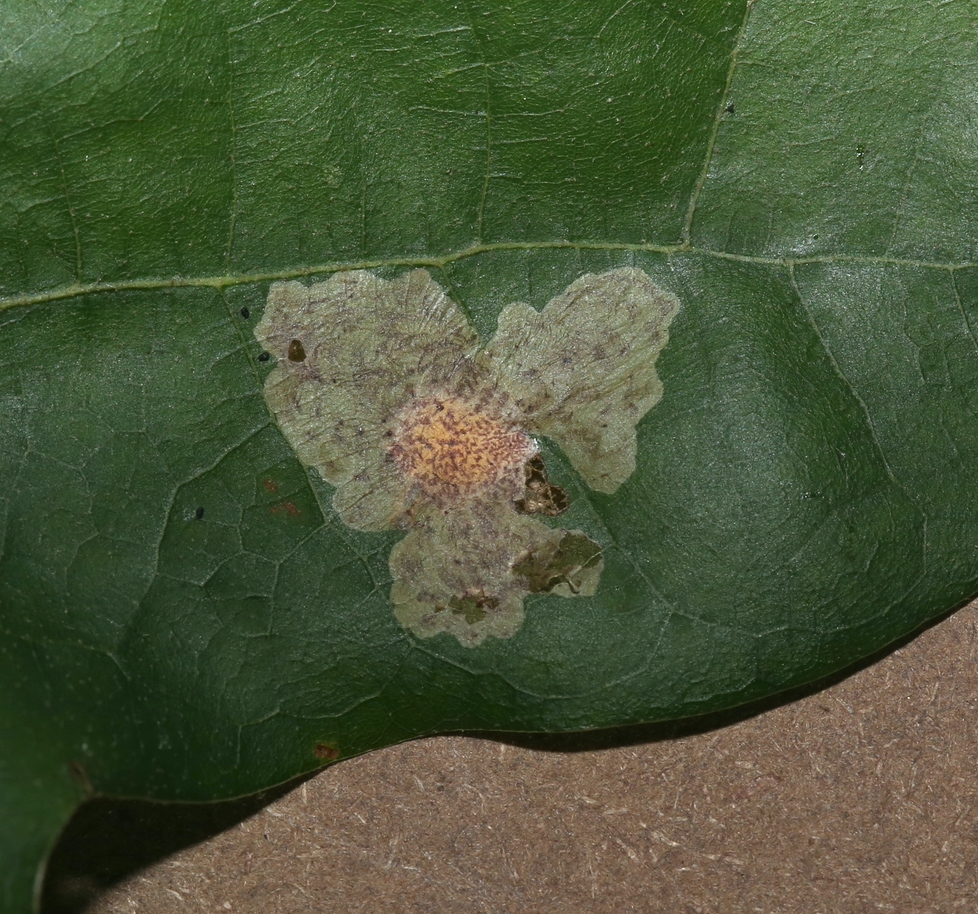
- Leaf mine on Quercus alba

Scientific classification
- Kingdom: Animalia
- Phylum: Arthropoda
- Class: Insecta
- Order: Lepidoptera
- Family: Tischeriidae
- Genus: Tischeria
- Species: T. quercitella

Binomial name
- Tischeria quercitella Clemens, 1863

Synonyms
- Tischeria tinctoriella Chambers, 1875

= Tischeria quercitella =

Oak blotch miner moth

Species of moth

Tischeria quercitella, the oak blotch miner moth, is a moth of the family Tischeriidae. It has been sighted in North America in Ontario, District of Columbia, Illinois, Kentucky, Massachusetts, Missouri, New Jersey, Ohio, Pennsylvania and Virginia.

The larvae feed on Castanea dentata,Castanea sativa, Castanea crenata, Castanea ozarkensis, Quercus alba, Quercus ilicifolia, Quercus prinus and Quercus velutina. They mine the leaves of their host plant.
