= Tischeria zestica =

Scientific classification
- Kingdom: Animalia
- Phylum: Arthropoda
- Class: Insecta
- Order: Lepidoptera
- Family: Tischeriidae
- Genus: Tischeria
- Species: T. zestica

Binomial name
- Tischeria zestica Meyrick, 1911

Species of moth

Tischeria zestica is a moth of the family Tischeriidae. It is known from South Africa (it was described from Pretoria).

The larvae feed on Grewia occidentalis. They probably mine the leaves of their host plant.
