= Tischeria deliquescens =

Scientific classification
- Kingdom: Animalia
- Phylum: Arthropoda
- Class: Insecta
- Order: Lepidoptera
- Family: Tischeriidae
- Genus: Tischeria
- Species: T. deliquescens

Binomial name
- Tischeria deliquescens Meyrick, 1915

Species of moth

Tischeria deliquescens is a moth of the family Tischeriidae. It is known from Guyana.
