= Tischeria gaunacella =

Scientific classification
- Domain: Eukaryota
- Kingdom: Animalia
- Phylum: Arthropoda
- Class: Insecta
- Order: Lepidoptera
- Family: Tischeriidae
- Genus: Tischeria
- Species: T. gaunacella

Binomial name
- Tischeria gaunacella Duponchel, 1843

Species of moth

Tischeria gaunacella is a species of lyonetiid moth in the family Tischeriidae.
