= Tischeria elongata =

Scientific classification
- Domain: Eukaryota
- Kingdom: Animalia
- Phylum: Arthropoda
- Class: Insecta
- Order: Lepidoptera
- Family: Tischeriidae
- Genus: Tischeria
- Species: T. elongata

Binomial name
- Tischeria elongata Walsingham, 1914

Species of moth

Tischeria elongata is a moth of the family Tischeriidae. It is known from Guerrero in Mexico.
