= Tischeria ceanothi =

Scientific classification
- Domain: Eukaryota
- Kingdom: Animalia
- Phylum: Arthropoda
- Class: Insecta
- Order: Lepidoptera
- Family: Tischeriidae
- Genus: Tischeria
- Species: T. ceanothi

Binomial name
- Tischeria ceanothi Walsingham, 1890

Synonyms
- Tischeria immaculata Braun, 1915

Species of moth

Tischeria ceanothi is a moth of the family Tischeriidae. It is known from California and Nevada in the United States.

The larvae feed on Ceanothus crassifolius, Ceanothus divaricatus, Ceanothus integerrimus, Ceanothus thyrsiflorus and Ceanothus velutinus. They mine the leaves of their host plant.
