= Tischeria sparmanniae =

Scientific classification
- Domain: Eukaryota
- Kingdom: Animalia
- Phylum: Arthropoda
- Class: Insecta
- Order: Lepidoptera
- Family: Tischeriidae
- Genus: Tischeria
- Species: T. sparmanniae

Binomial name
- Tischeria sparmanniae Puplesis and Diškus, 2003

Species of moth

Tischeria sparmanniae is a moth of the family Tischeriidae. It is known from South Africa, Zimbabwe and Namibia.

The larvae feed on Sparmannia ricinocarpa. They probably mine the leaves of their host plant.
