= Tischeria antilope =

Scientific classification
- Kingdom: Animalia
- Phylum: Arthropoda
- Clade: Pancrustacea
- Class: Insecta
- Order: Lepidoptera
- Family: Tischeriidae
- Genus: Tischeria
- Species: T. antilope

Binomial name
- Tischeria antilope Puplesis, Diškus and Mey, 2003

Species of moth

Tischeria antilope is a moth of the family Tischeriidae. It is known from Namibia.
