= Astrotischeria scalesiaella =

Scientific classification
- Kingdom: Animalia
- Phylum: Arthropoda
- Clade: Pancrustacea
- Class: Insecta
- Order: Lepidoptera
- Family: Tischeriidae
- Genus: Astrotischeria
- Species: A. scalesiaella

Binomial name
- Astrotischeria scalesiaella B. Landry, 2004

Species of moth

Astrotischeria scalesiaella is a moth of the family Tischeriidae. It was described by Bernard Landry in 2004. It is found on the Galápagos Islands.

The larvae feed on Scalesia species. They mine the leaves of their host plant.
