= Tischeria pulvella =

Scientific classification
- Kingdom: Animalia
- Phylum: Arthropoda
- Clade: Pancrustacea
- Class: Insecta
- Order: Lepidoptera
- Family: Tischeriidae
- Genus: Tischeria
- Species: T. pulvella

Binomial name
- Tischeria pulvella Chambers, 1878

Species of moth

Tischeria pulvella is a moth of the family Tischeriidae. It was identified and described in Texas, United States, in 1878 by Vactor Tousey Chambers.
