= Tischeria unicolor =

Scientific classification
- Domain: Eukaryota
- Kingdom: Animalia
- Phylum: Arthropoda
- Class: Insecta
- Order: Lepidoptera
- Family: Tischeriidae
- Genus: Tischeria
- Species: T. unicolor

Binomial name
- Tischeria unicolor Walsingham, 1897

Species of moth

Tischeria unicolor is a moth of the family Tischeriidae. It is known from St. Croix in the Virgin Islands.
