= Tischeria bifurcata =

Scientific classification
- Domain: Eukaryota
- Kingdom: Animalia
- Phylum: Arthropoda
- Class: Insecta
- Order: Lepidoptera
- Family: Tischeriidae
- Genus: Tischeria
- Species: T. bifurcata

Binomial name
- Tischeria bifurcata Braun, 1915

Species of moth

Tischeria bifurcata is a moth of the family Tischeriidae. It is known in the United States from Arizona and California.

The larvae feed on Ceanothus arboreus. They mine the leaves of their host plant.
