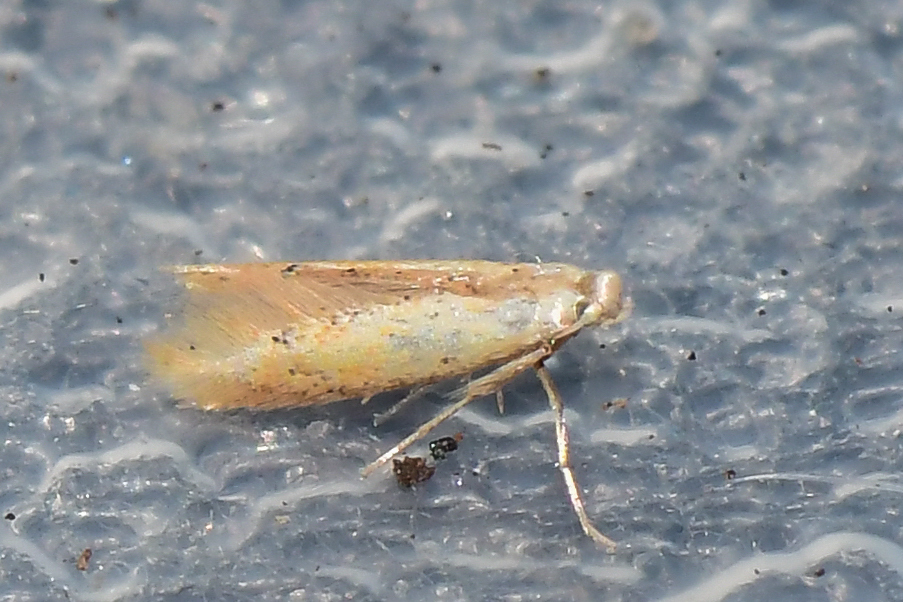
- Astrotischeria solidagonifoliella

Scientific classification
- Kingdom: Animalia
- Phylum: Arthropoda
- Clade: Pancrustacea
- Class: Insecta
- Order: Lepidoptera
- Family: Tischeriidae
- Genus: Astrotischeria; Puplesis & Diškus, 2003

= Astrotischeria =

Genus of moths

Astrotischeria is a genus of moths in the family Tischeriidae. It was described by Puplesis and Diškus in 2003.

== Species ==
- Astrotischeria alcedoensis B. Landry, 2004
- Astrotischeria ambrosiaeella (Chambers, 1875)
- Astrotischeria astericola (Braun, 1972)
- Astrotischeria explosa (Braun, 1923)
- Astrotischeria gregaria (Braun, 1972)
- Astrotischeria helianthi (Frey & Boll, 1878)
- Astrotischeria heliopsisella (Chambers, 1875)
- Astrotischeria heteroterae (Frey & Boll, 1878)
- Astrotischeria longeciliata (Frey & Boll, 1878)
- Astrotischeria marginata (Braun, 1972)
- Astrotischeria occidentalis (Braun, 1972)
- Astrotischeria omissa (Braun, 1927)
- Astrotischeria pallidipennella (Braun, 1972)
- Astrotischeria recta Diškus, Mey & Stonis, 2022
- Astrotischeria scalesiaella B. Landry, 2004
- Astrotischeria solidagonifoliella (Clemens, 1859)
