= Tischeria ekebladioides =

Scientific classification
- Domain: Eukaryota
- Kingdom: Animalia
- Phylum: Arthropoda
- Class: Insecta
- Order: Lepidoptera
- Family: Tischeriidae
- Genus: Tischeria
- Species: T. ekebladioides

Binomial name
- Tischeria ekebladioides Puplesis & Diskus, 2003

Species of moth

Tischeria ekebladioides is a moth of the family Tischeriidae. It is known from Spain, Portugal and Tunisia.

The larvae feed on Quercus mirbeckii, Quercus canariensis and Quercus suber. They mine the leaves of their host plant.
