= Tischeria decidua =

Scientific classification
- Kingdom: Animalia
- Phylum: Arthropoda
- Clade: Pancrustacea
- Class: Insecta
- Order: Lepidoptera
- Family: Tischeriidae
- Genus: Tischeria
- Species: T. decidua

Binomial name
- Tischeria decidua Wocke, 1876

Species of moth

Tischeria decidua is a moth of the family Tischeriidae. It is found in Central and Southern Europe, but has recently expanded its range and has been spotted in the Netherlands and Poland.

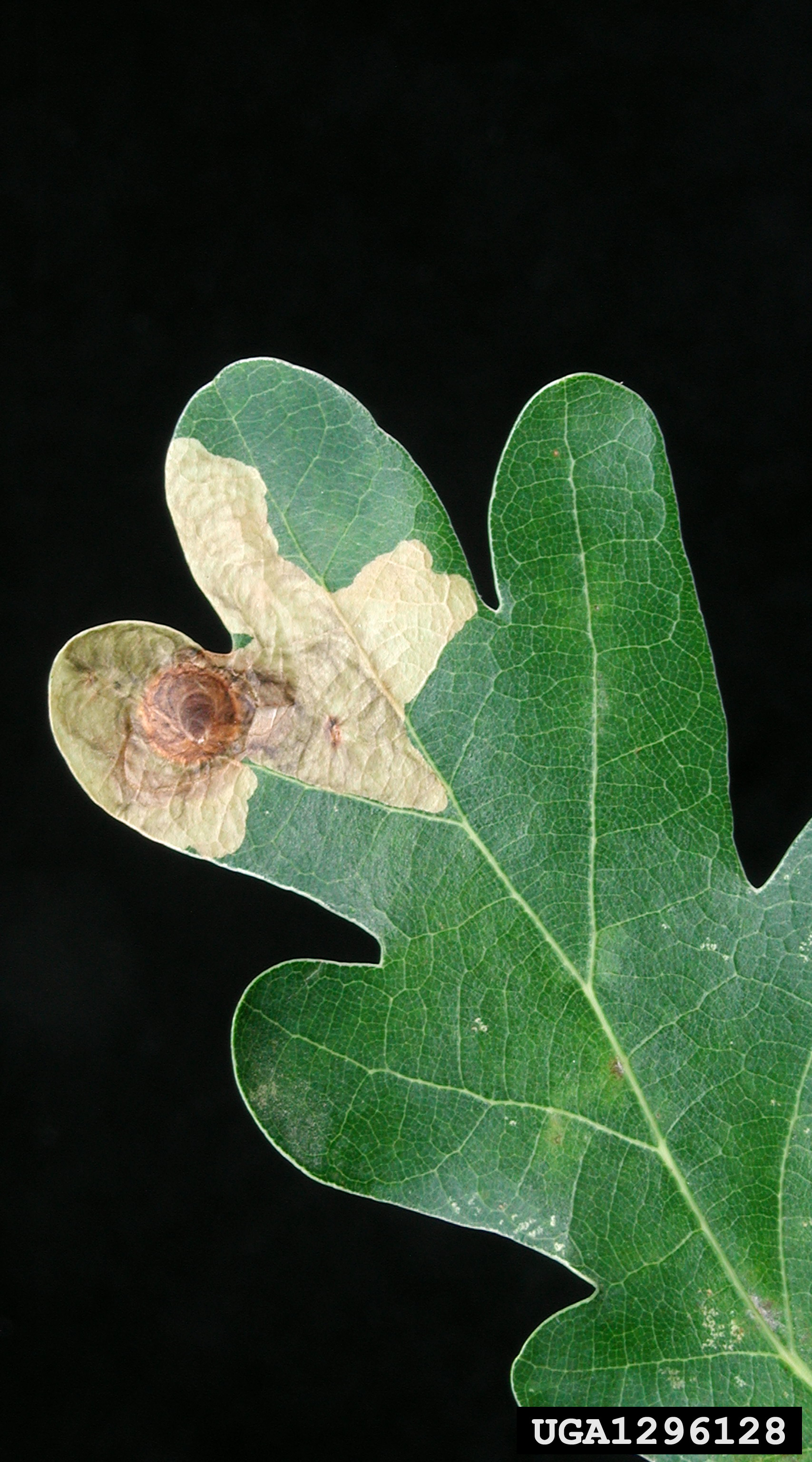
Damage

The larvae feed on Castanea sativa and Quercus species, including Quercus cerris, Quercus faginea, Quercus macrolepis, Quercus pedunculiflora, Quercus petraea, Quercus pubescens and Quercus robur x turneri. They mine the leaves of their host plant.
