= Tischeria dodonea =

Scientific classification
- Kingdom: Animalia
- Phylum: Arthropoda
- Clade: Pancrustacea
- Class: Insecta
- Order: Lepidoptera
- Family: Tischeriidae
- Genus: Tischeria
- Species: T. dodonea

Binomial name
- Tischeria dodonea Stainton, 1858

Synonyms
- Tischeria frausella Heyden, 1858

Species of moth

Tischeria dodonea is a moth of the family Tischeriidae. It is found from Fennoscandia to the Pyrenees, Italy and Romania and from Ireland to Ukraine. There is a disjunct population in eastern Russia.

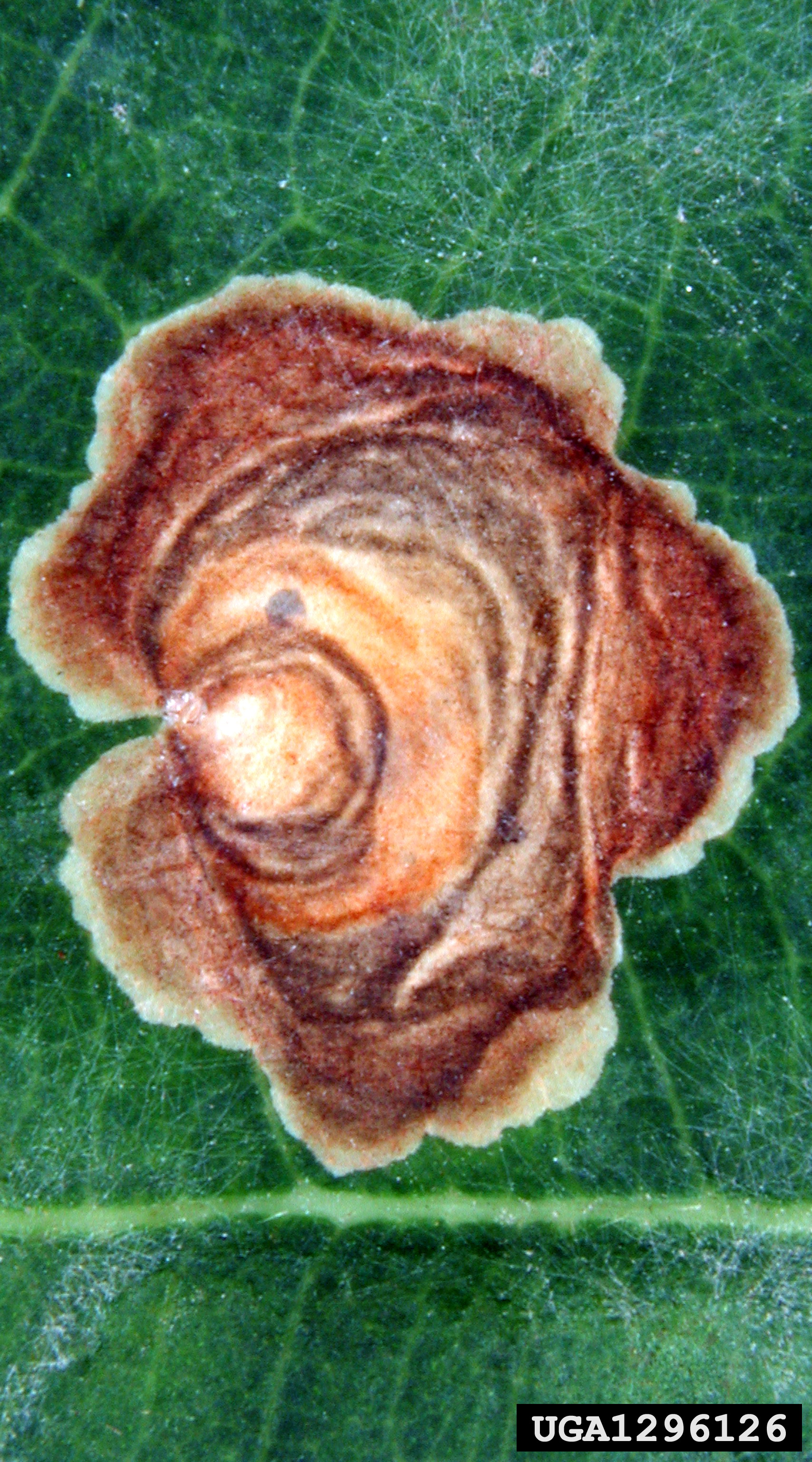
Damage

The moth is difficult to distinguish from Tischeria ekebladella (T. dodonea forewings are yellower, less fuscous-tinged towards apex; hindwings dark grey). Certain identification requires examination of a genitalia preparation.

Adults are on wing mainly June depending on the location.

The larvae feed on Castanea sativa and Quercus species, including Quercus faginea, Quercus macrolepis, Quercus petraea, Quercus pubescens, Quercus robur and Quercus rubra, x turneri. They mine the leaves of their host plant.
