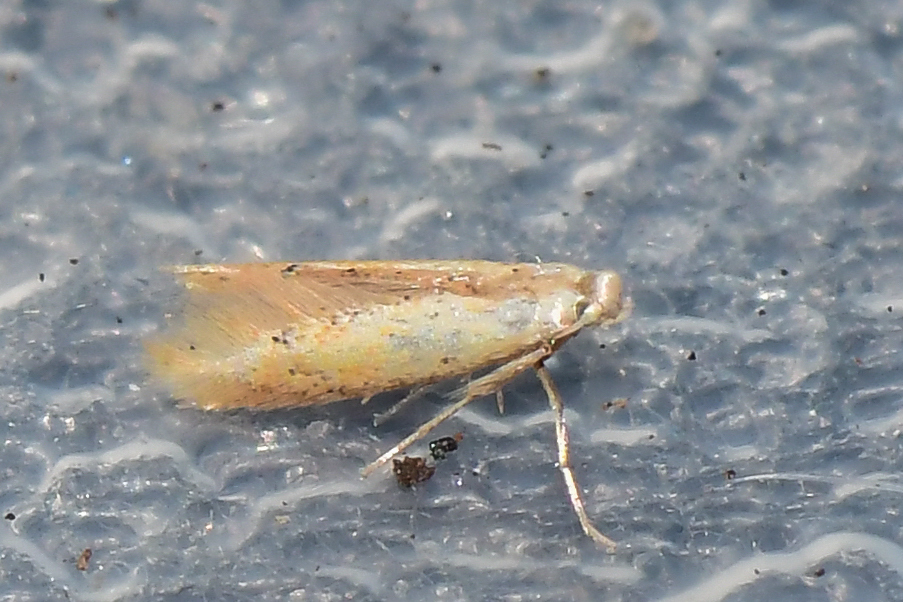

Scientific classification
- Kingdom: Animalia
- Phylum: Arthropoda
- Clade: Pancrustacea
- Class: Insecta
- Order: Lepidoptera
- Family: Tischeriidae
- Genus: Astrotischeria
- Species: A. solidagonifoliella

Binomial name
- Astrotischeria solidagonifoliella (Clemens, 1859)

Synonyms
- Tischeria solidagonifoliella Clemens, 1859

= Astrotischeria solidagonifoliella =

Species of moth

Astrotischeria solidagonifoliella is a moth of the family Tischeriidae. It was described by James Brackenridge Clemens in 1859. It is found in eastern North America, from Oklahoma and North Carolina to Quebec.

The larvae feed on Solidago species. They mine the leaves of their host plant.
