= Astrotischeria marginata =

Scientific classification
- Kingdom: Animalia
- Phylum: Arthropoda
- Class: Insecta
- Order: Lepidoptera
- Family: Tischeriidae
- Genus: Astrotischeria
- Species: A. marginata

Binomial name
- Astrotischeria marginata (Braun, 1972)

Synonyms
- Tischeria marginata Braun, 1972

Species of moth

Astrotischeria marginata is a moth of the family Tischeriidae. It was described by Annette Frances Braun in 1972. It is found in North America.
