= Astrotischeria gregaria =

Scientific classification
- Kingdom: Animalia
- Phylum: Arthropoda
- Clade: Pancrustacea
- Class: Insecta
- Order: Lepidoptera
- Family: Tischeriidae
- Genus: Astrotischeria
- Species: A. gregaria

Binomial name
- Astrotischeria gregaria (Braun, 1972)

Synonyms
- Tischeria gregaria Braun, 1972

Species of moth

Astrotischeria gregaria is a moth of the family Tischeriidae. It was described by Annette Frances Braun in 1972. It is found in North America.
