= Astrotischeria ambrosiaeella =

Scientific classification
- Kingdom: Animalia
- Phylum: Arthropoda
- Clade: Pancrustacea
- Class: Insecta
- Order: Lepidoptera
- Family: Tischeriidae
- Genus: Astrotischeria
- Species: A. ambrosiaeella

Binomial name
- Astrotischeria ambrosiaeella (Chambers, 1875)

Synonyms
- Tischeria ambrosiaeella Chambers, 1875; Tischeria ambrosiella Walsingham, 1890

Species of moth

Astrotischeria ambrosiaeella is a moth of the family Tischeriidae. It was described by Vactor Tousey Chambers in 1875. It is found in North America, including California, Florida, Louisiana, Ohio and Texas.

The larvae feed on Ambrosia trifida. They mine the leaves of their host plant.
