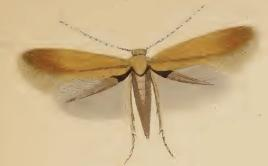

Scientific classification
- Kingdom: Animalia
- Phylum: Arthropoda
- Clade: Pancrustacea
- Class: Insecta
- Order: Lepidoptera
- Family: Tischeriidae
- Genus: Astrotischeria
- Species: A. heliopsisella

Binomial name
- Astrotischeria heliopsisella (Chambers, 1875)

Synonyms
- Tischeria heliopsisella Chambers, 1875; Tischeria nolckenii Frey & Boll, 1876

= Astrotischeria heliopsisella =

Species of moth

Astrotischeria heliopsisella is a moth of the family Tischeriidae. It was described by Vactor Tousey Chambers in 1875. It is found in North America, including Illinois, Missouri and Ohio.

The larvae feed on Heliopsis helianthoides and Ambrosia trifida. They mine the leaves of their host plant.
