= Astrotischeria pallidipennella =

Scientific classification
- Kingdom: Animalia
- Phylum: Arthropoda
- Clade: Pancrustacea
- Class: Insecta
- Order: Lepidoptera
- Family: Tischeriidae
- Genus: Astrotischeria
- Species: A. pallidipennella

Binomial name
- Astrotischeria pallidipennella (Braun, 1972)

Synonyms
- Tischeria pallidipennella Braun, 1972

Species of moth

Astrotischeria pallidipennella is a moth of the family Tischeriidae. It was described by Annette Frances Braun in 1972. It is found in North America.
