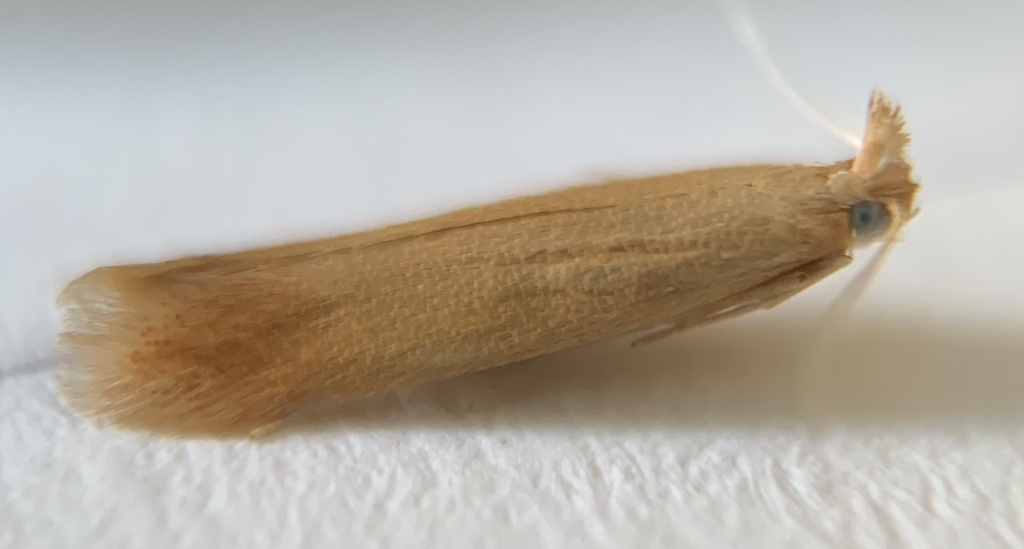

Scientific classification
- Kingdom: Animalia
- Phylum: Arthropoda
- Clade: Pancrustacea
- Class: Insecta
- Order: Lepidoptera
- Family: Tischeriidae
- Genus: Coptotriche
- Species: C. zelleriella

Binomial name
- Coptotriche zelleriella (Clemens, 1859)

Synonyms
- Tischeria zelleriella Clemens, 1859; Tischeria complanoides Frey & Boll, 1873; Tischeria latipennella Chambers, 1878; Tischeria sulphurea Frey & Boll, 1878

= Coptotriche zelleriella =

Species of moth

Coptotriche zelleriella is a moth of the family Tischeriidae. It was described by James Brackenridge Clemens in 1859. It is found in North America in Ontario, Quebec, Arkansas, the District of Columbia, Florida, Illinois, Kentucky, Massachusetts, Missouri, New Jersey, New York, North Carolina, Ohio, Pennsylvania, Texas, Virginia and West Virginia.

The larvae feed on Quercus alba, Quercus bicolor, Quercus montana, Quercus prinus, Quercus rubra and Quercus stellata. They mine the leaves of their host plant.
