= Astrotischeria omissa =

Scientific classification
- Domain: Eukaryota
- Kingdom: Animalia
- Phylum: Arthropoda
- Class: Insecta
- Order: Lepidoptera
- Family: Tischeriidae
- Genus: Astrotischeria
- Species: A. omissa

Binomial name
- Astrotischeria omissa (Braun, 1927)

Synonyms
- Tischeria omissa Braun, 1927

Species of moth

Astrotischeria omissa is a moth of the family Tischeriidae. It was described by Annette Frances Braun in 1927. It is found in North America, including Arizona, California and New Mexico.
