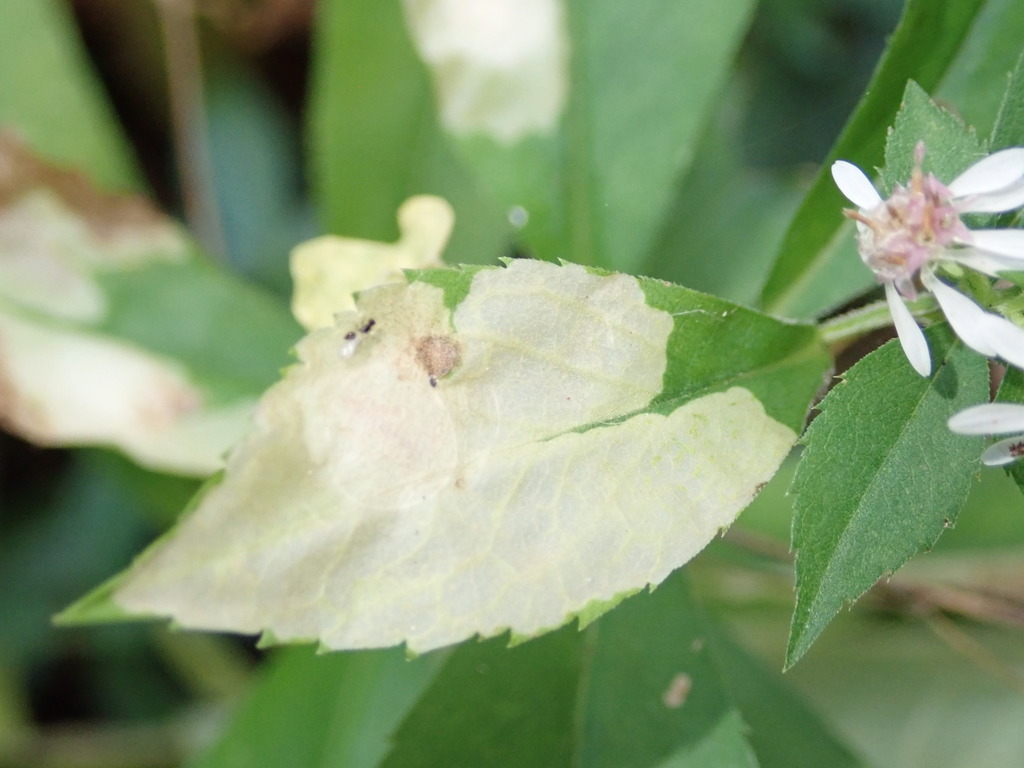
- Leaf mine on an aster species

Scientific classification
- Kingdom: Animalia
- Phylum: Arthropoda
- Class: Insecta
- Order: Lepidoptera
- Family: Tischeriidae
- Genus: Astrotischeria
- Species: A. astericola

Binomial name
- Astrotischeria astericola (Braun, 1972)

Synonyms
- Tischeria astericola Braun, 1972

= Astrotischeria astericola =

Species of insect

Astrotischeria astericola is a moth of the family Tischeriidae. It was originally described by Annette Frances Braun as Tischeria astericola in 1972. It is found in eastern North American woodlands.

The larvae feed on woodland asters (Symphyotrichum), including Symphyotrichum cordifolium and Symphyotrichum lateriflorum. They mine the leaves of their host plant.
