= Astrotischeria longeciliata =

Scientific classification
- Kingdom: Animalia
- Phylum: Arthropoda
- Clade: Pancrustacea
- Class: Insecta
- Order: Lepidoptera
- Family: Tischeriidae
- Genus: Astrotischeria
- Species: A. longeciliata

Binomial name
- Astrotischeria longeciliata (Frey & Boll, 1878)

Synonyms
- Tischeria longeciliata Frey & Boll, 1878

Species of moth

Astrotischeria longeciliata is a moth of the family Tischeriidae. It was described by Frey and Boll in 1878. It is found in North America.
