= Astrotischeria explosa =

Scientific classification
- Domain: Eukaryota
- Kingdom: Animalia
- Phylum: Arthropoda
- Class: Insecta
- Order: Lepidoptera
- Family: Tischeriidae
- Genus: Astrotischeria
- Species: A. explosa

Binomial name
- Astrotischeria explosa (Braun, 1923)

Synonyms
- Tischeria explosa Braun, 1923

Species of moth

Astrotischeria explosa is a moth of the family Tischeriidae. It was described by Annette Frances Braun in 1923. It is found in North America, including California.
