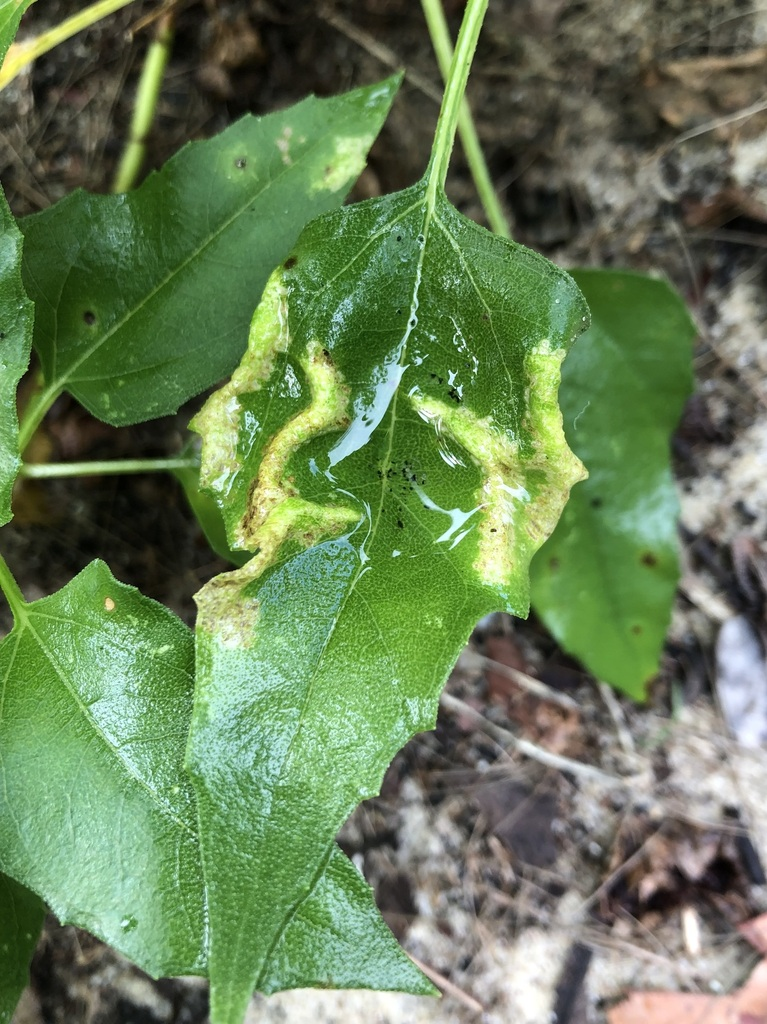

Scientific classification
- Kingdom: Animalia
- Phylum: Arthropoda
- Clade: Pancrustacea
- Class: Insecta
- Order: Lepidoptera
- Family: Tischeriidae
- Genus: Astrotischeria
- Species: A. helianthi

Binomial name
- Astrotischeria helianthi (Frey & Boll, 1878)

Synonyms
- Tischeria helianthi Frey & Boll, 1878

= Astrotischeria helianthi =

Species of moth

Astrotischeria helianthi is a moth of the family Tischeriidae. It was described by Frey and Boll in 1878. It is found in North America, including Missouri and Ohio. It hosts off of plants in the Helianthus genus, also known as sunflowers.
