= Coptotriche rosella =

Scientific classification
- Kingdom: Animalia
- Phylum: Arthropoda
- Class: Insecta
- Order: Lepidoptera
- Family: Tischeriidae
- Genus: Coptotriche
- Species: C. rosella

Binomial name
- Coptotriche rosella (Gerasimov, 1937)

Synonyms
- Tischeria rosella Gerasimov, 1937; Emmetia rosella

Species of moth

Coptotriche rosella is a moth of the family Tischeriidae. It is found in Turkmenistan, Uzbekistan and Tajikistan.

The larvae feed on Rosa species. They probably mine the leaves of their host plant.
