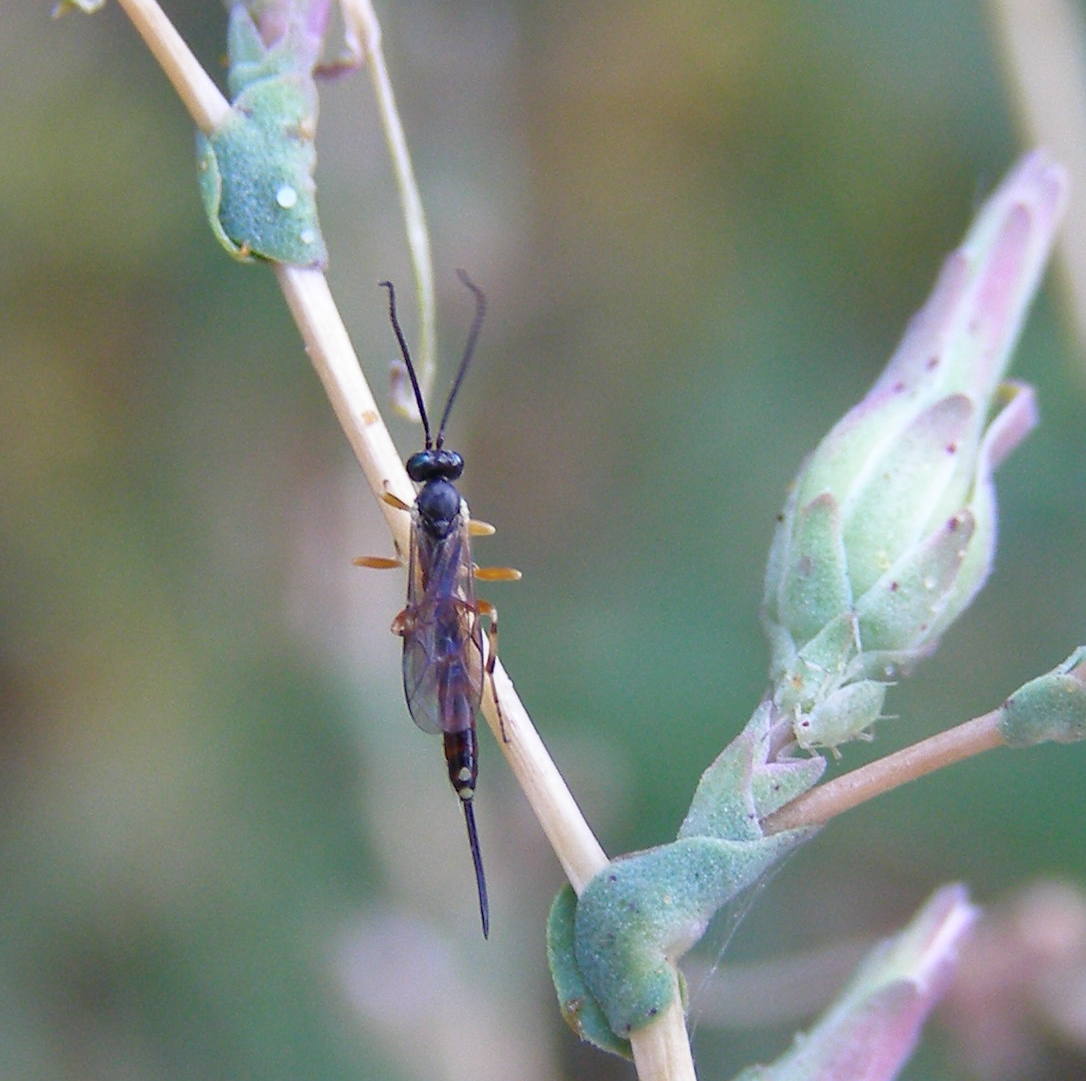
- Female asleep on Lactuca serriola Zwakhals ID

Scientific classification
- Kingdom: Animalia
- Phylum: Arthropoda
- Clade: Pancrustacea
- Class: Insecta
- Order: Hymenoptera
- Family: Ichneumonidae
- Subfamily: Campopleginae; Förster, 1869

Tribes
- Campoplegini; Cymodusini; Hellwigiini; Limneriini; Nesomesochorini; Nonini

= Campopleginae =

Subfamily of wasps

Campopleginae is a large subfamily of the parasitoid wasp family Ichneumonidae with a world-wide distribution. Species in this subfamily have been used in the biological control of the alfalfa weevil, clover weevil, various species of Heliothis, oriental army worm, European corn borer, larch sawfly, and others.

== Description and diversity ==
Campopleginae is one of the most commonly encountered subfamilies of Ichneumonidae and contains 65 genera. Many of the genera are poorly defined and difficult to identify. Campoplegines are small, slender, black and brown insects with a laterally compressed abdomen. The clypeus is confluent with the rest of the face. Many species produce black and white cocoons.

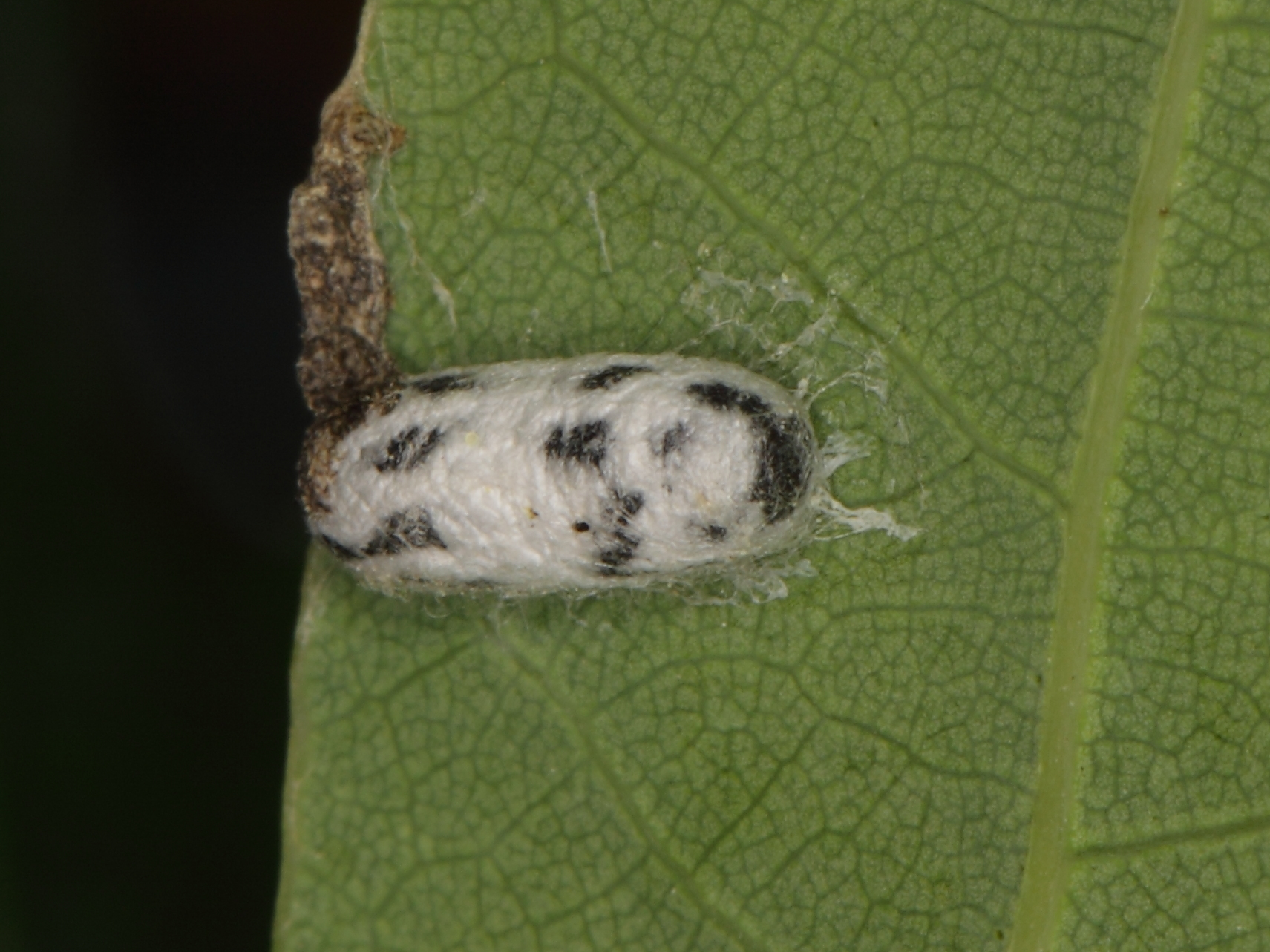
Cocoon of a Campopleginae wasp and the empty skin of the caterpillar host

== Biology ==
Campoplegines are koinobiont endoparasitoids mainly of Lepidoptera and Symphyta but also of Coleoptera and Raphidiidae. Most attack weakly concealed larval hosts in early instars. Most species are solitary, but a few may be gregarious, with multiple parasitoid larvae emerging from the same host. Some members of this subfamily possess polydna viruses which are injected into the host during oviposition.

== Genera ==
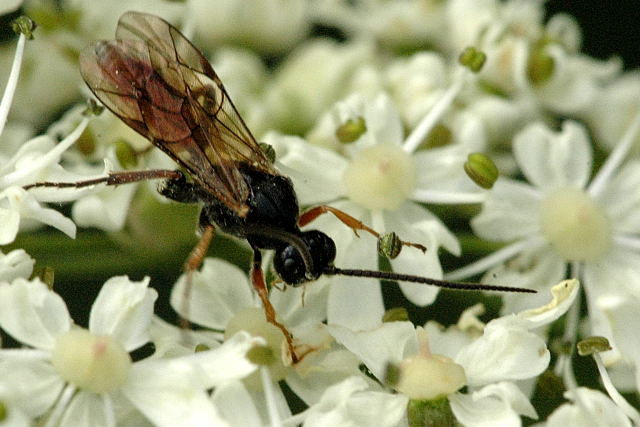
Olesicampe

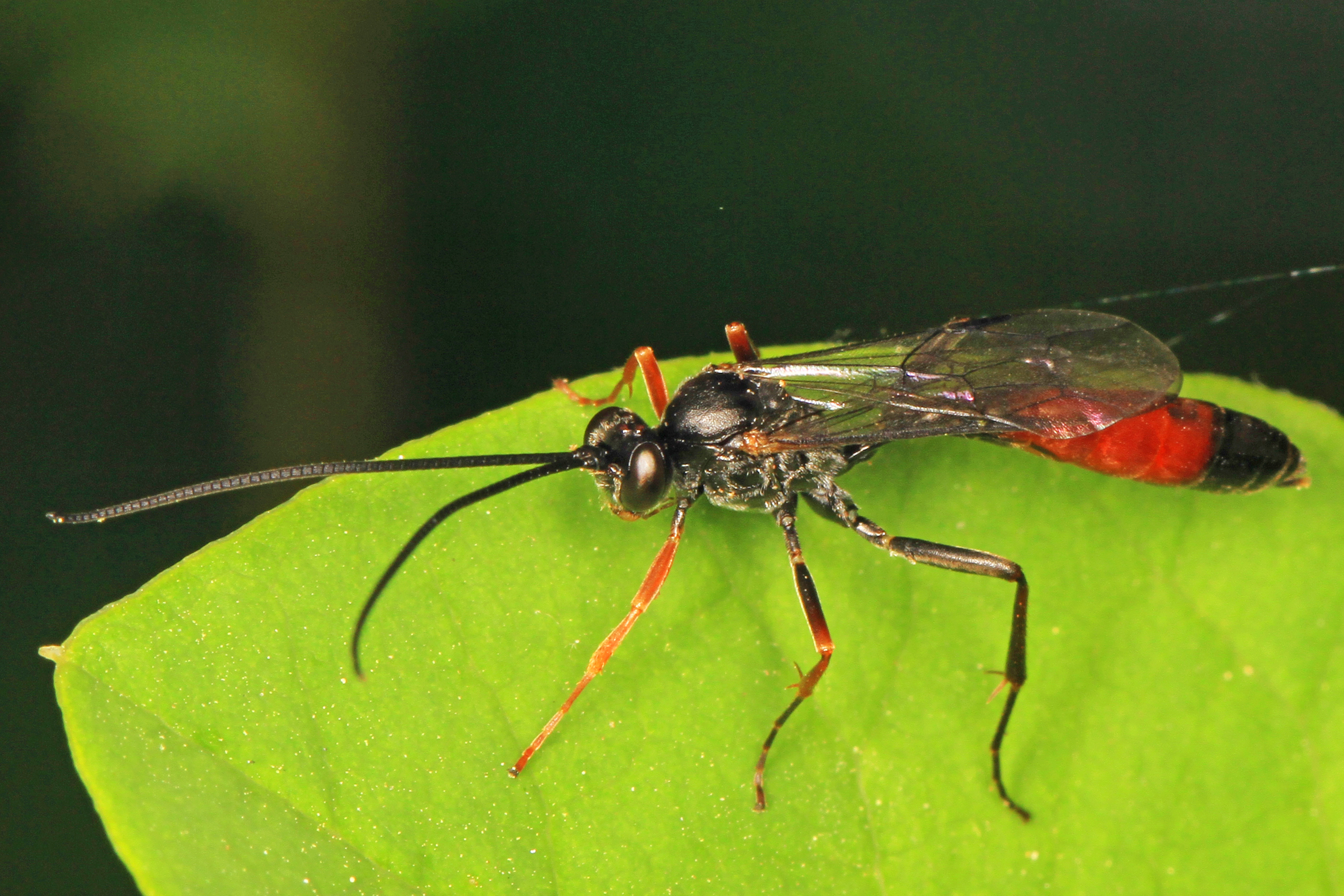
Dusona

These 67 genera belong to the subfamily Campopleginae:

- Aiura Onody & Penteado-Dias, 2006^{c g}
- Alcima Förster, 1869^{c g}
- Allotheca Cameron, 1906^{c}
- Aspidon Gupta, 1989^{c g}
- Bathyplectes Förster, 1869^{c g b}
- Benjaminia Viereck, 1912^{c g}
- Breviterebra Kusigemati, 1982^{c g}
- Callidora Förster, 1869^{c g}
- Campoctonus Viereck, 1912^{c g b}
- Campoletis Forster, 1869^{c g b}
- Campoplex Gravenhorst, 1829^{c g b}
- Casinaria Holmgren, 1859^{c g b}
- Charmops Gupta, 1989^{c g}
- Charops Holmgren, 1859^{c g b}
- Chriodes Förster, 1868^{c g}
- Chromoplex Horstmann, 1987^{c g}
- Clypeoplex Horstmann, 1987^{c g}
- Cymodusa Holmgren, 1859^{c g b}
- Cymodusopsis Viereck, 1912^{c g}
- Diadegma Forster, 1869^{c g b}
- Dolophron Förster, 1869^{c g}
- Dusona Cameron, 1900^{c g b}
- Echthronomas Förster, 1869^{c g}
- Enytus Cameron, 1905^{c g b}
- Eriborus Förster, 1869^{c g b}
- Eucaphila Gauld, 1984^{c g}
- Genotropis Townes, 1969^{c g}
- Gonotypus Förster, 1869^{c g}
- Hellwigia Gravenhorst, 1823^{c g}
- Hyposoter Forster, 1869^{c g b}
- Lathroplex Förster, 1869^{c g}
- Lathrostizus Forster, 1869^{c g b}
- Lemophagus Townes, 1965^{c g b}
- Leptocampoplex Horstmann, 1970^{c g}
- Leptoperilissus Schmiedeknecht, 1912^{c g}
- Macrulus Horstmann, 1978^{c g}
- Macrus Gravenhorst, 1829^{c g}
- Melalophacharops Uchida, 1928^{c g}
- Melanoplex Horstmann, 1987^{c g}
- Meloboris Holmgren, 1859^{c g}
- Microcharops Roman, 1910^{c g}
- Nemeritis Holmgren, 1860^{c g}
- Neolophron Gauld, 1984^{c g}
- Nepiesta Förster, 1869^{c g}
- Nonnus Cresson, 1874^{c g}
- Olesicampe Forster, 1869^{c g b}
- Pegaoplex Dbar, 1984^{c g}
- Philositus Townes, 1969^{c g}
- Phobocampe Forster, 1869^{c g b}
- Picacharops Gauld, 1984^{c g}
- Porizon Fallen, 1813^{c g}
- Prochas Walkley, 1959^{c g}
- Pyracmon Holmgren, 1859^{c g}
- Rhachioplex Bischoff, 1932^{c g}
- Rhimphoctona Förster, 1869^{c g}
- Scenocharops Uchida, 1932^{c g}
- Scirtetes Hartig, 1838^{c g}
- Sesioplex Viereck, 1912^{c g b}
- Sinophorus Forster, 1869^{c g b}
- Skiapus Morley, 1917^{c g}
- Sliochia Gauld, 1976^{c g}
- Synetaeris Forster, 1869^{c g b}
- Tranosema Forster, 1869^{c g b}
- Tranosemella Horstmann, 1978^{c g}
- Urvashia Gupta & Gupta, 1971^{c g}
- Venturia Schrottky, 1902^{c g b}
- Xanthocampoplex Morley, 1913^{c g}

Data sources: i = ITIS, c = Catalogue of Life, g = GBIF, b = Bugguide.net
