= Limneriini =

Scientific classification
- Domain: Eukaryota
- Kingdom: Animalia
- Phylum: Arthropoda
- Class: Insecta
- Order: Hymenoptera
- Family: Ichneumonidae
- Subfamily: Campopleginae
- Tribe: Limneriini; Szépligeti, 1908

Genera
- See text

Tribe of wasps

Limneriini is a tribe of ichneumon wasps in the subfamily Campopleginae.

== Genera ==
Alcima - Bathyplectes - Benjaminia - Biolysia - Callidora - Campoletis - Cymodusa - Diadegma - Dolophron - Dusona - Echthronomas - Eriborus - Eripternus - Gonotypus - Hyposoter - Lathroplex - Lathrostizus - Leptocampoplex - Leptoperilissús - Macrulus - Macrus - Melalophacharops - Meloboris - Menaca - Nemeritis - Nepiera - Nepiesta - Olesicampe - Pyracmon - Rhimphoctona - Sesioplex - Spudastica - Tranosema - Tranosemella
