= Charops =

Charops ( Χάρωψ ) or Charopus may refer to:

- Charops (mythology), several Greek mythological characters
- Charops of Epirus (2nd century BC), two statesmen (grandfather and grandson)
- Charops (Decennial archon) (753 BC), Eupatridae who was the first Decennial Archon
- Charops (wasp), a genus of insects in the tribe Campoplegini

Charopus may refer to:

- Charopus (beetle), a genus of insects in the subfamily Malachiinae
