= C. petiolaris =

C. petiolaris may refer to:

- Casinaria petiolaris, an ichneumon species in the genus Casinaria and the family Ichneumonidae
- Cordyline petiolaris, a plant species found in New South Wales, Australia

== See also ==
- Petiolaris (disambiguation)
