= Campoplegini =

Scientific classification
- Domain: Eukaryota
- Kingdom: Animalia
- Phylum: Arthropoda
- Class: Insecta
- Order: Hymenoptera
- Family: Ichneumonidae
- Subfamily: Campopleginae
- Tribe: Campoplegini; Ashmead

Genera
- Casinaria; Campoplex; Charops; Scenocharops; Sinophorus

Synonyms
- Porizontini

Tribe of wasps

Campoplegini is a tribe of parasitic wasps in the subfamily Campopleginae.
