= Eriborus terebrans =

Scientific classification
- Kingdom: Animalia
- Phylum: Arthropoda
- Clade: Pancrustacea
- Class: Insecta
- Order: Hymenoptera
- Family: Ichneumonidae
- Genus: Eriborus
- Species: E. terebrans

Binomial name
- Eriborus terebrans (Gravenhorst 1829)

Synonyms
- Campoplex terebrans Gravenhorst, 1829

Species of insect

Eriborus terebrans is a species of solitary parasitoid of European corn borer caterpillars and Paranthrene tabaniformis caterpillars.
