= N. elegans =

N. elegans may refer to:

- Narcissus elegans, a daffodil
- Naso elegans, the elegant unicornfish, Indian orange-spine unicorn, orange-spine unicorn or smoothheaded unicornfish, a tropical fish found in coral reefs in the Indian Ocean
- Nemeritis elegans, a species of ichneumon wasps found in Europe
- Neoheterandria elegans, the tiger teddy, a small livebearing fish species found in Colombia
- Nymphaea elegans, the tropical royalblue water-lily, an aquatic plant found in Louisiana, Florida and Texas, in the United States, in Oaxaca in Mexico and in Antioquia in Colombia
