= Paranthrene mesothyris =

Scientific classification
- Kingdom: Animalia
- Phylum: Arthropoda
- Clade: Pancrustacea
- Class: Insecta
- Order: Lepidoptera
- Family: Sesiidae
- Genus: Paranthrene
- Species: P. mesothyris

Binomial name
- Paranthrene mesothyris Hampson, 1919

Species of moth

Paranthrene mesothyris is a moth of the family Sesiidae. It is known from South Africa.
