= Paranthrene thalassina =

Scientific classification
- Kingdom: Animalia
- Phylum: Arthropoda
- Class: Insecta
- Order: Lepidoptera
- Family: Sesiidae
- Genus: Paranthrene
- Species: P. thalassina

Binomial name
- Paranthrene thalassina Hampson, 1919

Species of moth

Paranthrene thalassina is a moth of the family Sesiidae. It is known from Malawi.
