= Paranthrene porphyractis =

Scientific classification
- Kingdom: Animalia
- Phylum: Arthropoda
- Clade: Pancrustacea
- Class: Insecta
- Order: Lepidoptera
- Family: Sesiidae
- Genus: Paranthrene
- Species: P. porphyractis

Binomial name
- Paranthrene porphyractis (Meyrick, 1937)

Synonyms
- Homogyna porphyractis Meyrick, 1937

Species of moth

Paranthrene porphyractis is a moth of the family Sesiidae. It is known from Uganda.
