= Paranthrene chalcochlora =

Scientific classification
- Kingdom: Animalia
- Phylum: Arthropoda
- Clade: Pancrustacea
- Class: Insecta
- Order: Lepidoptera
- Family: Sesiidae
- Genus: Paranthrene
- Species: P. chalcochlora

Binomial name
- Paranthrene chalcochlora Hampson, 1919

Species of moth

Paranthrene chalcochlora is a species of moth of the family Sesiidae. It is known from Zambia.
