= Paranthrene anthrax =

Scientific classification
- Domain: Eukaryota
- Kingdom: Animalia
- Phylum: Arthropoda
- Class: Insecta
- Order: Lepidoptera
- Family: Sesiidae
- Genus: Paranthrene
- Species: P. anthrax

Binomial name
- Paranthrene anthrax Le Cerf, 1916

Species of moth

Paranthrene anthrax is a moth of the family Sesiidae. It is known from Sierra Leone.
