= List of Olesicampe species =

This is a list of 135 species in Olesicampe, a genus of ichneumon wasps in the family Ichneumonidae.

== Olesicampe species ==
- Olesicampe abnormis (Brischke, 1880)^{c g}
- Olesicampe affinis (Parfitt, 1882)^{c g}
- Olesicampe alaskensis (Ashmead, 1902)^{c g}
- Olesicampe albispina (Cameron, 1886)^{c}
- Olesicampe alboplica (Thomson, 1887)^{c g}
- Olesicampe alpestris (Cameron, 1886)^{c g}
- Olesicampe alpina (Strobl, 1904)^{c g}
- Olesicampe annulata (Provancher, 1879)^{c g}
- Olesicampe annulitarsis (Thomson, 1887)^{c g}
- Olesicampe argentata (Gravenhorst, 1829)^{c g}
- Olesicampe atypica (Viereck, 1925)^{c}
- Olesicampe auctor (Gravenhorst, 1829)^{c g}
- Olesicampe banffensis (Viereck, 1925)^{c g}
- Olesicampe barbata (Provancher, 1886)^{c g}
- Olesicampe basalis (Thomson, 1887)^{c g}
- Olesicampe beginii (Ashmead, 1896)^{c g}
- Olesicampe benefactor (Thomson, 1887)^{b}
- Olesicampe bimaculata (Gravenhorst, 1829)^{c}
- Olesicampe binotata (Thomson, 1887)^{c}
- Olesicampe brachyura (Ashmead, 1890)^{c g}
- Olesicampe breviseta (Brischke, 1880)^{c g}
- Olesicampe buccata (Thomson, 1887)^{c g}
- Olesicampe californica (Cresson, 1879)^{c g}
- Olesicampe canaliculata (Gravenhorst, 1829)^{c g}
- Olesicampe cavigena (Thomson, 1887)^{c g}
- Olesicampe clandestina (Holmgren, 1860)^{c g}
- Olesicampe clypearis (Brischke, 1880)^{c g}
- Olesicampe cognata (Brischke, 1880)^{c}
- Olesicampe confinis (Holmgren, 1858)^{c g}
- Olesicampe conformis (Ratzeburg, 1848)^{c g}
- Olesicampe conglomerata Hedwig, 1956^{c g}
- Olesicampe consobrina (Holmgren, 1860)^{c g}
- Olesicampe consueta (Brues, 1910)^{c g}
- Olesicampe crassitarsis (Thomson, 1887)^{c g}
- Olesicampe curtigena (Thomson, 1887)^{c g}
- Olesicampe cushmani (Viereck, 1926)^{c g}
- Olesicampe decora (Viereck, 1925)^{c}
- Olesicampe delicata (Viereck, 1925)^{c g}
- Olesicampe dentata (Provancher, 1874)^{c g}
- Olesicampe deposita (Brues, 1910)^{c g}
- Olesicampe depressa (Brischke, 1880)^{c g}
- Olesicampe egregia (Viereck, 1925)^{c}
- Olesicampe elongata (Brischke, 1880)^{c g}
- Olesicampe errans (Holmgren, 1860)^{c g}
- Olesicampe erythropyga (Holmgren, 1860)^{c}
- Olesicampe extrema (Holmgren, 1872)^{c g}
- Olesicampe femorella (Thomson, 1887)^{c g}
- Olesicampe flaveolata (de Stefani, 1894)^{c g}
- Olesicampe flaviclypeus (Viereck, 1921)^{c g}
- Olesicampe flavicornis (Thomson, 1887)^{c g}
- Olesicampe flavifacies Kasparyan, 1976^{c g}
- Olesicampe flaviricta (Cresson, 1864)^{c g}
- Olesicampe forticostata (Schmiedeknecht, 1909)^{c g}
- Olesicampe fossata (Viereck, 1925)^{c g}
- Olesicampe fulcrans (Thomson, 1887)^{c g}
- Olesicampe fulviventris (Gmelin, 1790)^{c g}
- Olesicampe gallicator (Aubert, 1964)^{c g}
- Olesicampe genalis Horstmann & Yu, 1999^{c g}
- Olesicampe geniculata (Uchida, 1932)^{c}
- Olesicampe geniculatae Quednau & Lim, 1983^{c g}
- Olesicampe geniculella (Thomson, 1887)^{c g}
- Olesicampe genuicincta (Hedwig, 1932)^{c g}
- Olesicampe gibba (Brischke, 1880)^{c g}
- Olesicampe gracilipes (Thomson, 1887)^{c}
- Olesicampe heterogaster (Thomson, 1887)^{c g}
- Olesicampe illepida (Cresson, 1872)^{c g}
- Olesicampe incompleta (Brischke, 1880)^{c g}
- Olesicampe insidiator (Gravenhorst, 1829)^{c g}
- Olesicampe johnsoni (Viereck, 1925)^{c g}
- Olesicampe kincaidi (Davis, 1898)^{c g}
- Olesicampe lata (Viereck, 1925)^{c}
- Olesicampe laticeps (Brischke, 1880)^{c g}
- Olesicampe longicornis (Brischke, 1880)^{c g}
- Olesicampe longipes (Müller, 1776)^{c g}
- Olesicampe lophyri (Riley, 1877)^{c g}
- Olesicampe lucida Szepligeti, 1916^{c g}
- Olesicampe macellator (Thunberg, 1822)^{c g}
- Olesicampe melanogaster (Thomson, 1887)^{c g}
- Olesicampe mimetica (Viereck, 1925)^{c}
- Olesicampe montezuma (Cameron, 1886)^{c}
- Olesicampe monticola (Hedwig, 1938)^{c g}
- Olesicampe nematicida (Viereck, 1925)^{c g}
- Olesicampe nematorum (Tschek, 1871)^{c g}
- Olesicampe nigricoxa (Thomson, 1887)^{c}
- Olesicampe nigridorsis (Viereck, 1925)^{c g}
- Olesicampe nigrifemur (Szépligeti, 1901)^{c g}
- Olesicampe nigroplica (Thomson, 1887)^{c g}
- Olesicampe obscura (Roman, 1923)^{c g}
- Olesicampe obscuripes (Viereck, 1903)^{c g}
- Olesicampe ocellata (Viereck, 1925)^{c}
- Olesicampe pagana (Holmgren, 1860)^{c g}
- Olesicampe pallidipes (Roman, 1926)^{c g}
- Olesicampe paludicola (Holmgren, 1860)^{c g}
- Olesicampe patellana (Thomson, 1887)^{c g}
- Olesicampe patula (Viereck, 1925)^{c g}
- Olesicampe peraffinis (Ashmead, 1890)^{c g}
- Olesicampe peregrina (Brischke, 1880)^{c g}
- Olesicampe petiolata (Viereck, 1925)^{c}
- Olesicampe pikonemae Walley, 1942^{c g}
- Olesicampe plena (Brues, 1910)^{c g}
- Olesicampe praecox (Holmgren, 1860)^{c g}
- Olesicampe praeoccupator (Aubert, 1974)^{c g}
- Olesicampe proterva (Brischke, 1880)^{c g}
- Olesicampe prussica (Brischke, 1880)^{c g}
- Olesicampe pteronideae (Rohwer, 1915)^{c g}
- Olesicampe pubescens (Ratzeburg, 1844)^{c g}
- Olesicampe punctitarsis (Thomson, 1887)^{c g}
- Olesicampe radiella (Thomson, 1885)^{c g}
- Olesicampe ratzeburgi (Tschek, 1871)^{c g}
- Olesicampe retusa (Thomson, 1887)^{c g}
- Olesicampe ruficornis (Provancher, 1875)^{c}
- Olesicampe rugulosa (Brischke, 1880)^{c g}
- Olesicampe sericea (Holmgren, 1856)^{c g}
- Olesicampe signata (Brischke, 1880)^{c g}
- Olesicampe sinuata (Thomson, 1887)^{c g}
- Olesicampe sordidella (Holmgren, 1860)^{c g}
- Olesicampe spireae (Thomson, 1887)^{c g}
- Olesicampe sternella (Thomson, 1887)^{c g}
- Olesicampe stigmatica (Brischke, 1880)^{c}
- Olesicampe tarsata (Brischke, 1880)^{g}
- Olesicampe tarsator (Thomson, 1887)^{c g}
- Olesicampe tecta (Brues, 1910)^{c g}
- Olesicampe terebrator Hinz, 1975^{c g}
- Olesicampe teutonum (Dalla Torre, 1901)^{c g}
- Olesicampe thapsicola Seyrig, 1927^{c g}
- Olesicampe thoracica (Brischke, 1880)^{c g}
- Olesicampe tianschanica (Kokujev, 1915)^{c g}
- Olesicampe transiens (Ratzeburg, 1848)^{c g}
- Olesicampe typica (Viereck, 1925)^{c g}
- Olesicampe umbrata (Brischke, 1880)^{c}
- Olesicampe vetula (Holmgren, 1860)^{c g}
- Olesicampe vetusta (Brues, 1910)^{c g}
- Olesicampe vexata (Holmgren, 1860)^{c g}
- Olesicampe virginiensis (Viereck, 1921)^{c g}
- Olesicampe vitripennis (Holmgren, 1860)^{c g}

Data sources: i = ITIS, c = Catalogue of Life, g = GBIF, b = Bugguide.net
