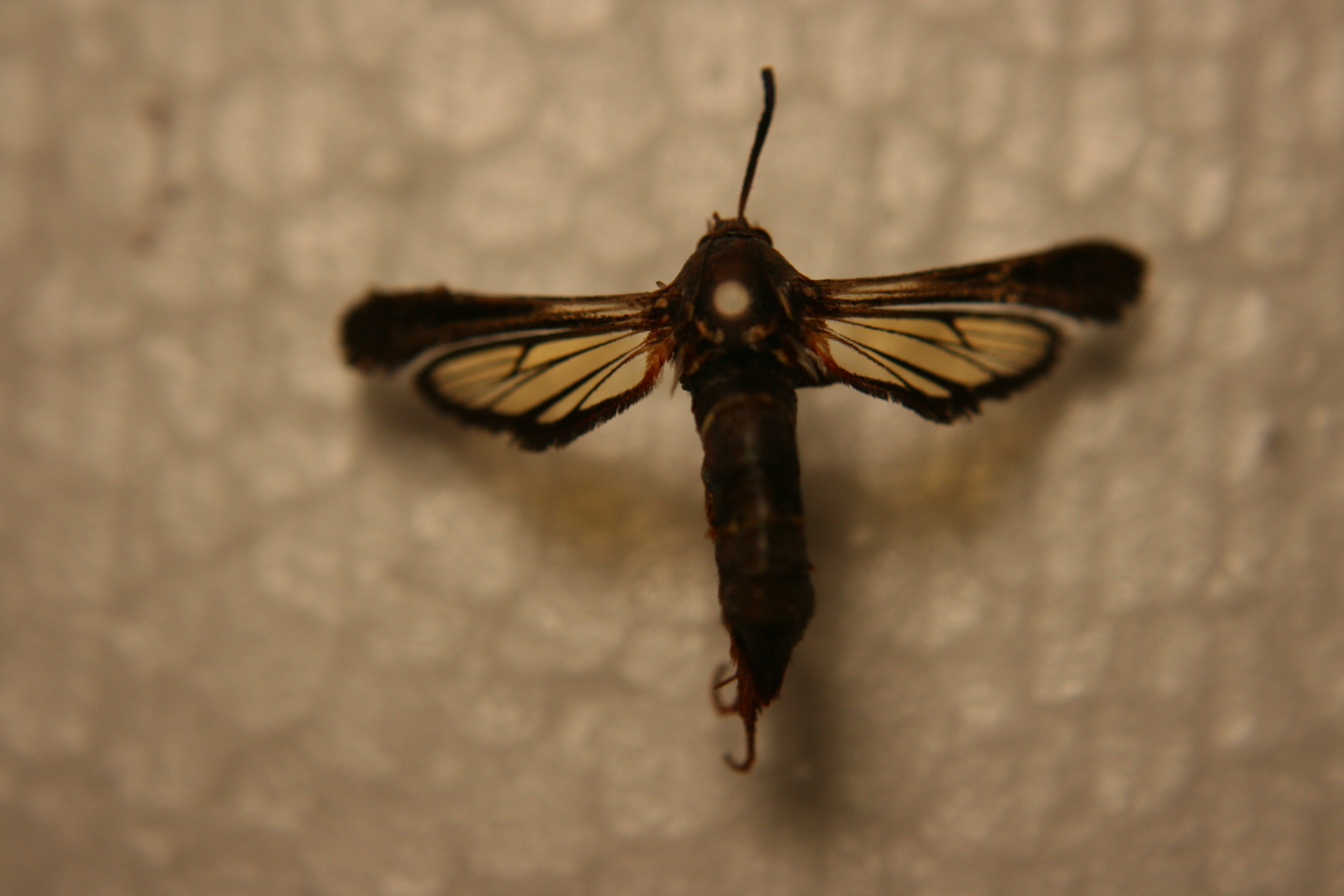

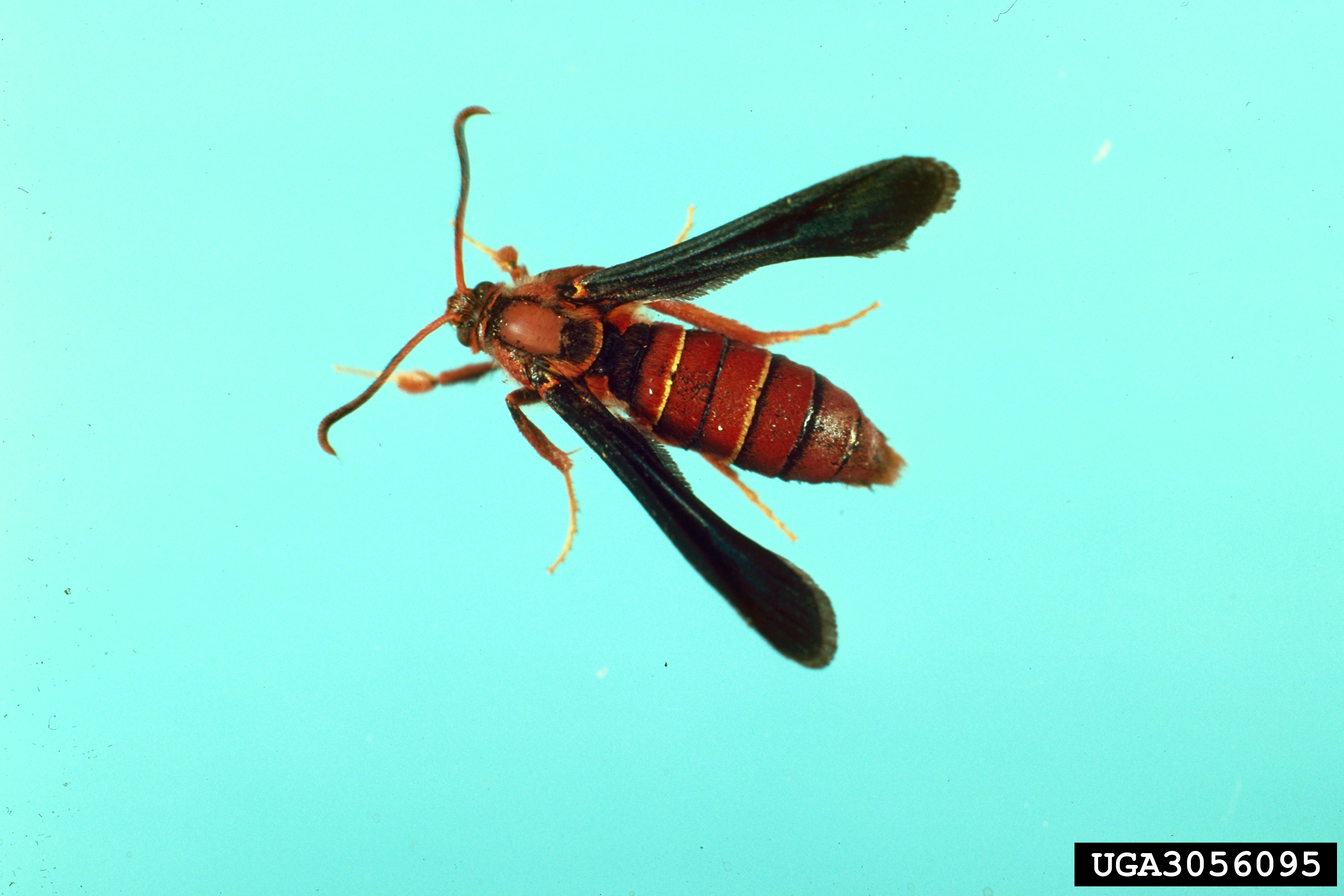

Scientific classification
- Kingdom: Animalia
- Phylum: Arthropoda
- Class: Insecta
- Order: Lepidoptera
- Family: Sesiidae
- Genus: Paranthrene
- Species: P. dollii

Binomial name
- Paranthrene dollii Neumoegen, 1894

= Paranthrene dollii =

Species of moth

Paranthrene dollii, commonly known as Doll's clearwing moth or the cottonwood clearwing borer, is a moth of the family Sesiidae. It is found in North America.

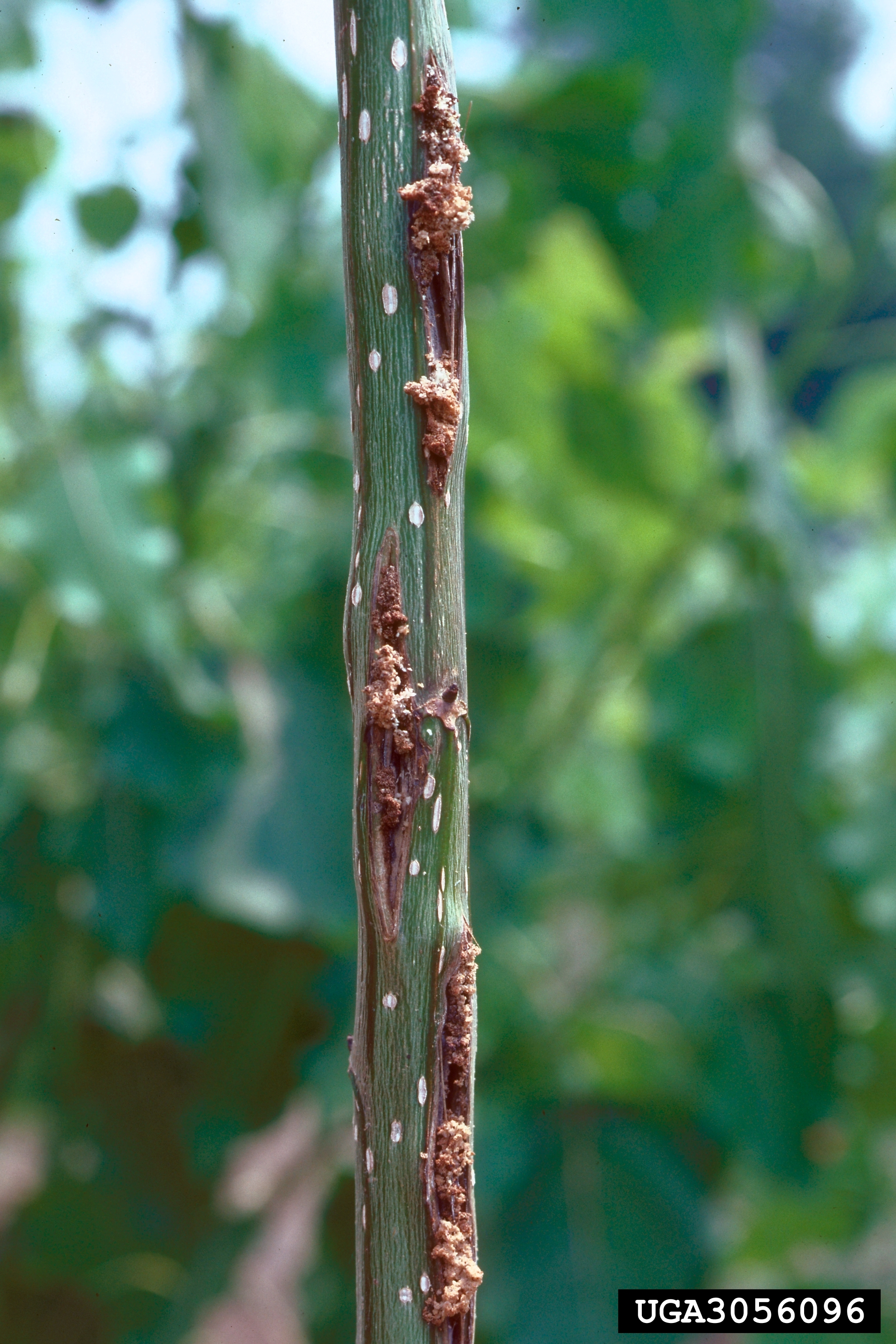
damage

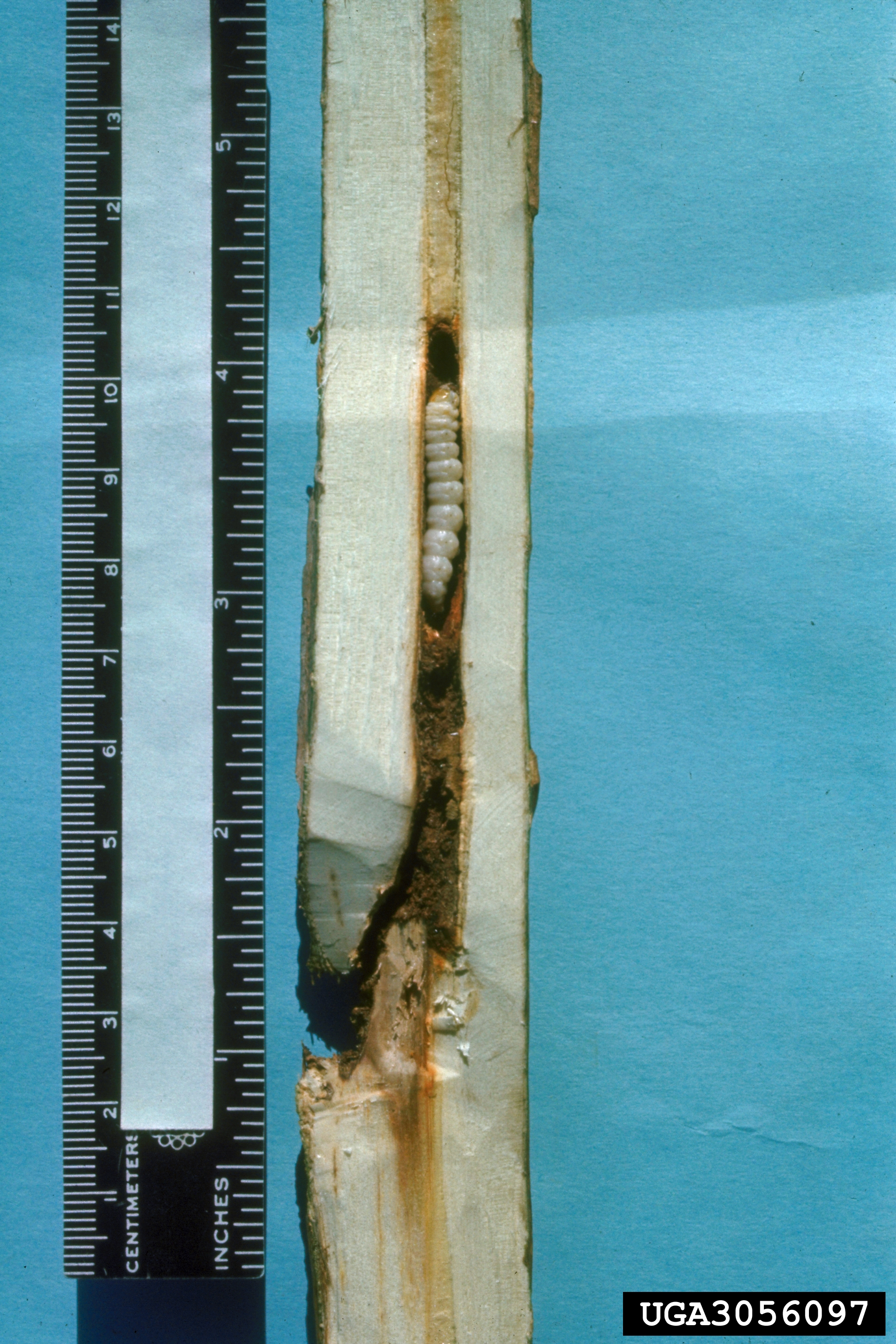
damage

The wingspan is about 37 mm. Adults are on wing from March to October, with the potential to go on multiple flights.

The larvae feed on poplar and willow.
