= Campoletis =

Scientific classification
- Domain: Eukaryota
- Kingdom: Animalia
- Phylum: Arthropoda
- Class: Insecta
- Order: Hymenoptera
- Family: Ichneumonidae
- Subfamily: Campopleginae
- Tribe: Limneriini
- Genus: Campoletis; Förster, 1869

Genus of wasps

Campoletis is a genus of parasitoid wasps belonging to the family Ichneumonidae.

The genus was first described by Förster in 1869.

The genus has cosmopolitan distribution.

Species:

- Campoletis agilis
- Campoletis annulata
- Campoletis clepsydra
- Campoletis deserticola
- Campoletis kangalogba
- Campoletis latrator
- Campoletis sonorensis
- Campoletis crassicornis (Tschek, 1871)
- Campoletis varians
