= Clypeoplex =

Scientific classification
- Domain: Eukaryota
- Kingdom: Animalia
- Phylum: Arthropoda
- Class: Insecta
- Order: Hymenoptera
- Family: Ichneumonidae
- Subfamily: Campopleginae
- Genus: Clypeoplex; Horstmann, 1987

Genus of wasps

Clypeoplex is a genus of parasitoid wasps belonging to the family Ichneumonidae.

The genus was first described by Horstmann in 1987.

Species:

- Clypeoplex cerophagus (Gravenhorst, 1829)
