= Paranthrene xanthosoma =

Scientific classification
- Kingdom: Animalia
- Phylum: Arthropoda
- Class: Insecta
- Order: Lepidoptera
- Family: Sesiidae
- Genus: Paranthrene
- Species: P. xanthosoma

Binomial name
- Paranthrene xanthosoma (Hampson, 1910)

Synonyms
- Sciapteron xanthosoma Hampson, 1910

Species of moth

Paranthrene xanthosoma is a moth of the family Sesiidae. It is known, from Uganda and Zimbabwe.
