= Nemeritis =

Scientific classification
- Kingdom: Animalia
- Phylum: Arthropoda
- Class: Insecta
- Order: Hymenoptera
- Family: Ichneumonidae
- Subfamily: Campopleginae
- Tribe: Limneriini
- Genus: Nemeritis; Holmgren, 1860

Species
- Several, including: Nemeritis canescens; Nemeritis elegans

Genus of wasps

Nemeritis is a genus of ichneumon wasps.
