= Aiura (wasp) =

Scientific classification
- Domain: Eukaryota
- Kingdom: Animalia
- Phylum: Arthropoda
- Class: Insecta
- Order: Hymenoptera
- Family: Ichneumonidae
- Subfamily: Campopleginae
- Genus: Aiura; Onody & Penteado-Dias, 2006

Genus of insects

Aiura is a genus of parasitoid wasps belonging to the family Ichneumonidae and the subfamily Campopleginae.

The genus is only known from Brazil.

== Species ==
Two species are currently recognized:

- Aiura miri Onody & Penteado-Dias, 2006
- Aiura turu Onody & Penteado-Dias, 2006

== Description ==
Eyes moderately indented at the level of the antennal sockets. Cheeks and mandibles of moderate length. Clypeus weakly convex to flat. Propodeum long in profile and produced into a "neck" posteriorly. Propodeal spiracle circular-subcircular. Fore wing 3.5–5.0 mm, areolet present and petiolate above. Nervellus of hind wing not intercepted. Metasoma very long and slender, first segment with petioloar suture complete, glymma present. Thyridia subcircular and very distant from base of the second tergite. Third tergite and onwards incised mid-dorsally. Ovipositor stout and turned upwards.

== Etymology ==
The genus name is derived from the Tupi language (Aiúra = "neck"), referring to the neck like structure at the posterior edge of the propodeum.
