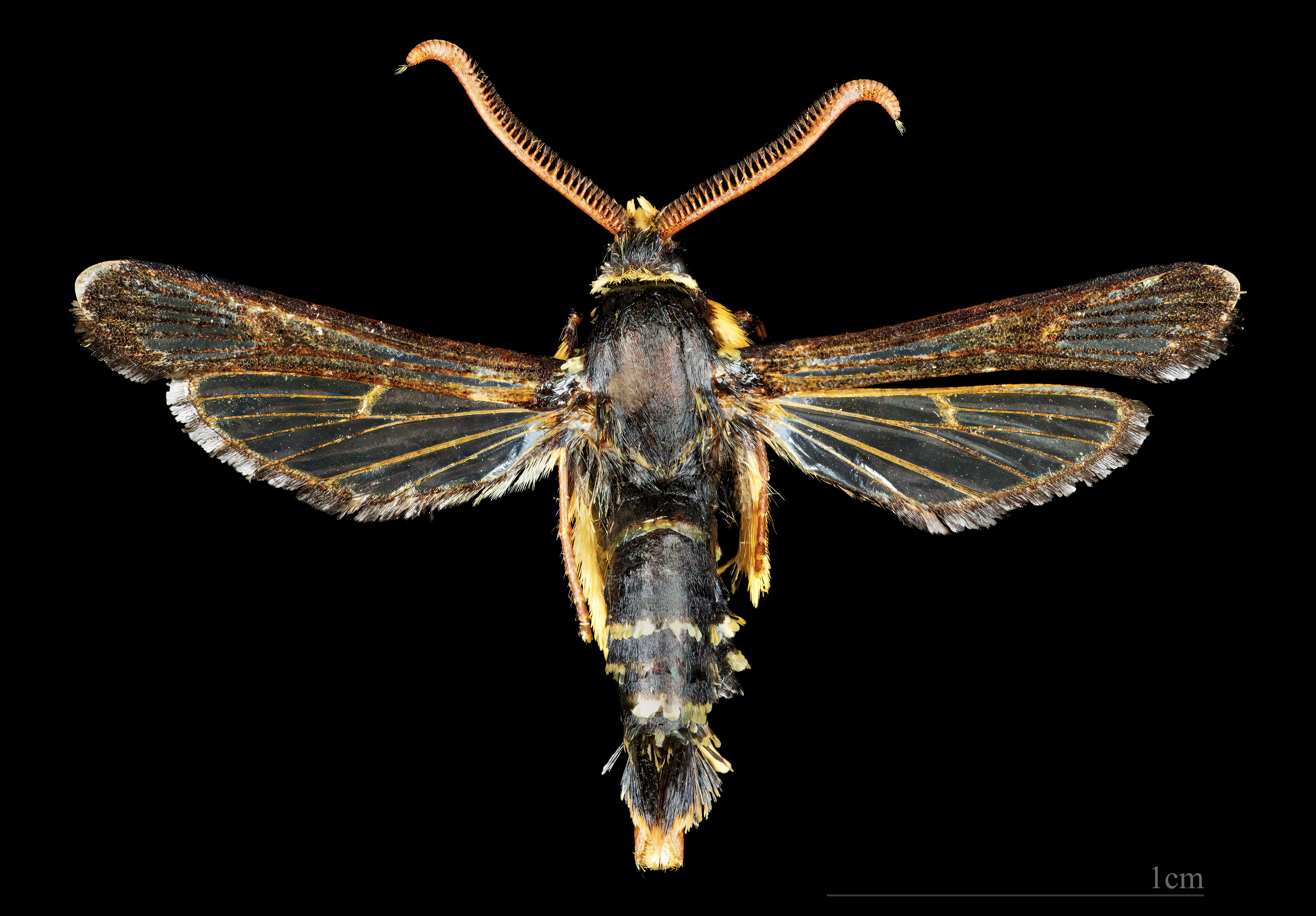
- Female - dorsal
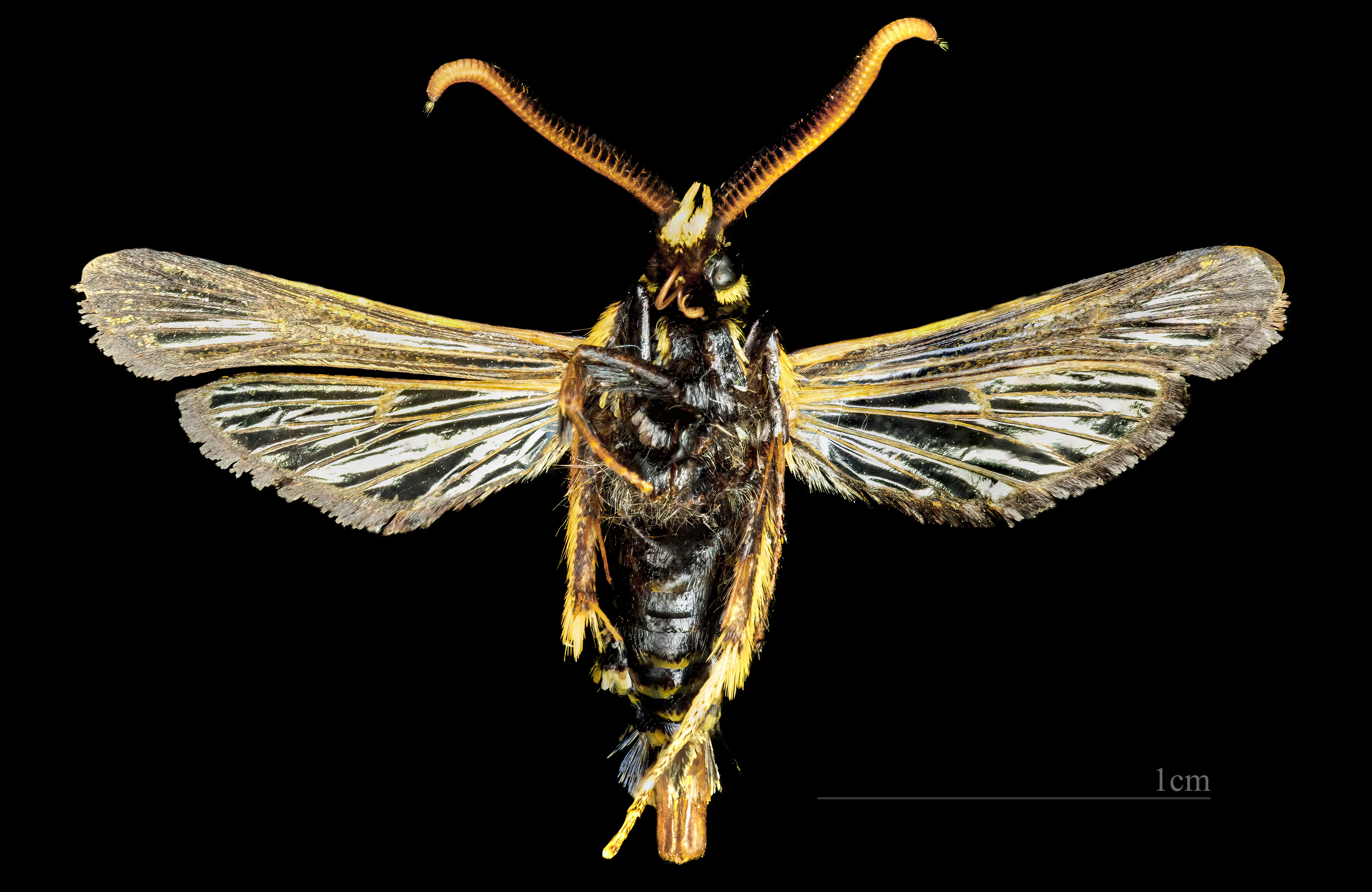
- Female - ventral

Scientific classification
- Domain: Eukaryota
- Kingdom: Animalia
- Phylum: Arthropoda
- Class: Insecta
- Order: Lepidoptera
- Family: Sesiidae
- Genus: Paranthrene
- Species: P. insolita

Binomial name
- Paranthrene insolita Le Cerf, 1914

Synonyms
- Sciapteron aurantiacum Rebel, 1917; Paranthrene insolitus

= Paranthrene insolita =

Species of moth

Paranthrene insolita is a moth of the family Sesiidae. It is found in large parts of Europe, Turkey, Iraq, the Levant, Israel and the Palestinian Territories.

The larvae feed on Quercus species, Populus canadensis, Populus pyramidalis and possibly Salix alba.

== Subspecies ==
- Paranthrene insolita insolita (Turkey)
- Paranthrene insolita hispanica Špatenka & Laštuvka, 1997 (southern Spain)
- Paranthrene insolita mardina Špatenka & Laštuvka, 1997 (south-eastern Turkey, northern Iraq, the Levant, Palestine)
- Paranthrene insolita polonica Schnaider, [1939] (north-eastern Spain, southern France, central Italy, Poland, Germany, Slovakia, the Czech Republic, Hungary, Dalmatia, Ukraine, Bulgaria)
