= Paranthrene diaphana =

Scientific classification
- Domain: Eukaryota
- Kingdom: Animalia
- Phylum: Arthropoda
- Class: Insecta
- Order: Lepidoptera
- Family: Sesiidae
- Genus: Paranthrene
- Species: P. diaphana

Binomial name
- Paranthrene diaphana Dalla Torre & Strand, 1925

Species of moth

Paranthrene diaphana is a moth of the family Sesiidae. It is found in Croatia, Bosnia and Herzegovina, Serbia and Montenegro, the Republic of Macedonia and Bulgaria, as well as Turkey, Azerbaijan and Iran.

The larvae feed on Populus and Salix species (including Salix alba). They mine the trunks of their host plant.
