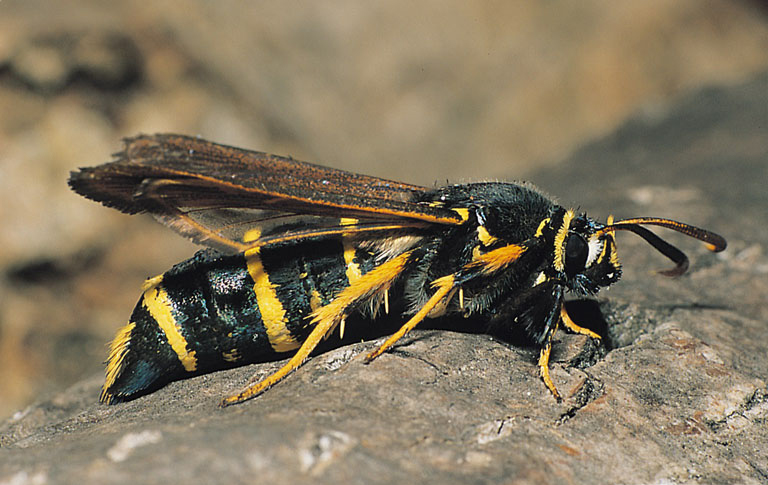

Scientific classification
- Kingdom: Animalia
- Phylum: Arthropoda
- Clade: Pancrustacea
- Class: Insecta
- Order: Lepidoptera
- Family: Sesiidae
- Tribe: Paranthrenini
- Genus: Paranthrene; Hübner, [1819]

Species
- See text

= Paranthrene =

Genus of moths

Paranthrene is a genus of moths in the family Sesiidae.

== Species ==
- Paranthrene diaphana Dalla Torre & Strand, 1925
- Paranthrene flammans (Hampson, [1893a])
- Paranthrene insolita Le Cerf, 1914
  - Paranthrene insolita insolita Le Cerf, 1914
  - Paranthrene insolita mardina Špatenka & Laštuvka, 1997
  - Paranthrene insolita polonica Schnaider, [1939]
  - Paranthrene insolita hispanica Špatenka & Laštuvka, 1997
- Paranthrene tabaniformis (Rottemburg, 1775)
  - Paranthrene tabaniformis tabaniformis (Rottemburg, 1775)
  - Paranthrene tabaniformis kungessana (Alpheraky, 1882)
  - Paranthrene tabaniformis synagriformis (Rambur, [1866])
- Paranthrene asilipennis (Boisduval in Guerin-Meneville, [1832])
- Paranthrene dollii (Neumoegen, 1894)
- Paranthrene fenestrata Barnes & Lindsey, 1922
- Paranthrene pellucida Greenfield & Karandinos, 1979
- Paranthrene robiniae (Edwards, 1880)
- Paranthrene simulans (Grote, 1881)
- Paranthrene dolens (Druce, 1899)
- Paranthrene karli Eichlin, 1989
- Paranthrene rufocorpus Eichlin, 1989
- Paranthrene anthrax Le Cerf, 1916
- Paranthrene callipleura (Meyrick, 1932)
- Paranthrene chalcochlora Hampson, 1919
- Paranthrene dukei Bartsch, 2008
- Paranthrene mesothyris Hampson, 1919
- Paranthrene porphyractis (Meyrick, 1937)
- Paranthrene propyria Hampson, 1919
- Paranthrene thalassina Hampson, 1919
- Paranthrene xanthosoma (Hampson, 1910)
- Paranthrene actinidiae Yang & Wang, 1989
- Paranthrene affinis Rothschild, 1911
- Paranthrene aureoviridis Petersen, 2001
- Paranthrene auricollum (Hampson, [1893a])
- Paranthrene aurifera Hampson, 1919
- Paranthrene cambodialis (Walker, [1865])
- Paranthrene chrysochloris (Hampson, 1897)
- Paranthrene cupreivitta (Hampson, [1893])
- Paranthrene cyanogama Meyrick, 1930
- Paranthrene cyanopis Durrant, 1915
- Paranthrene dohertyi (Rothschild, 1911)
- Paranthrene dominiki Fischer, 2006a
- Paranthrene gracilis (Swinhoe, 1890)
- Paranthrene henrici Le Cerf, 1916
- Paranthrene hyalochrysa Diakonoff, 1954
- Paranthrene javana Le Cerf, 1916b
- Paranthrene leucocera Hampson, 1919
- Paranthrene meeki (Druce, 1898)
- Paranthrene metallica (Hampson, [1893])
- Paranthrene metaxantha Hampson, 1919
- Paranthrene microthyris Hampson, 1919
- Paranthrene minuta (Swinhoe, 1890)
- Paranthrene noblei (Swinhoe, 1890)
- Paranthrene oberthueri Le Cerf, 1916
- Paranthrene panorpaeformis (Boisduval, [1875])
- Paranthrene poecilocephala Diakonoff, [1968]
- Paranthrene pulchripennis (Walker, 1862)
- Paranthrene rufifinis (Walker, 1862)
- Paranthrene sesiiformis Moore, 1858
- Paranthrene tristis Le Cerf, 1917
- Paranthrene zoneiventris Le Cerf, 1916
- Paranthrene zygophora Hampson, 1919
