= Paranthrene robiniae =

Scientific classification
- Domain: Eukaryota
- Kingdom: Animalia
- Phylum: Arthropoda
- Class: Insecta
- Order: Lepidoptera
- Family: Sesiidae
- Genus: Paranthrene
- Species: P. robiniae

Binomial name
- Paranthrene robiniae (Edwards, 1880)

Synonyms
- Sciapteron robiniae Edwards, 1880; Memythrus perlucida (Busck, 1915); Paranthrene f. palescens Engelhardt, 1946

Species of moth

Paranthrene robiniae, the western poplar clearwing, is a moth of the family Sesiidae. It is found from sea level to near the timber line from Alaska southward along the Pacific Coast to southern California and throughout the Rocky Mountains into the desert southwest and as far east as Kansas and North Dakota.

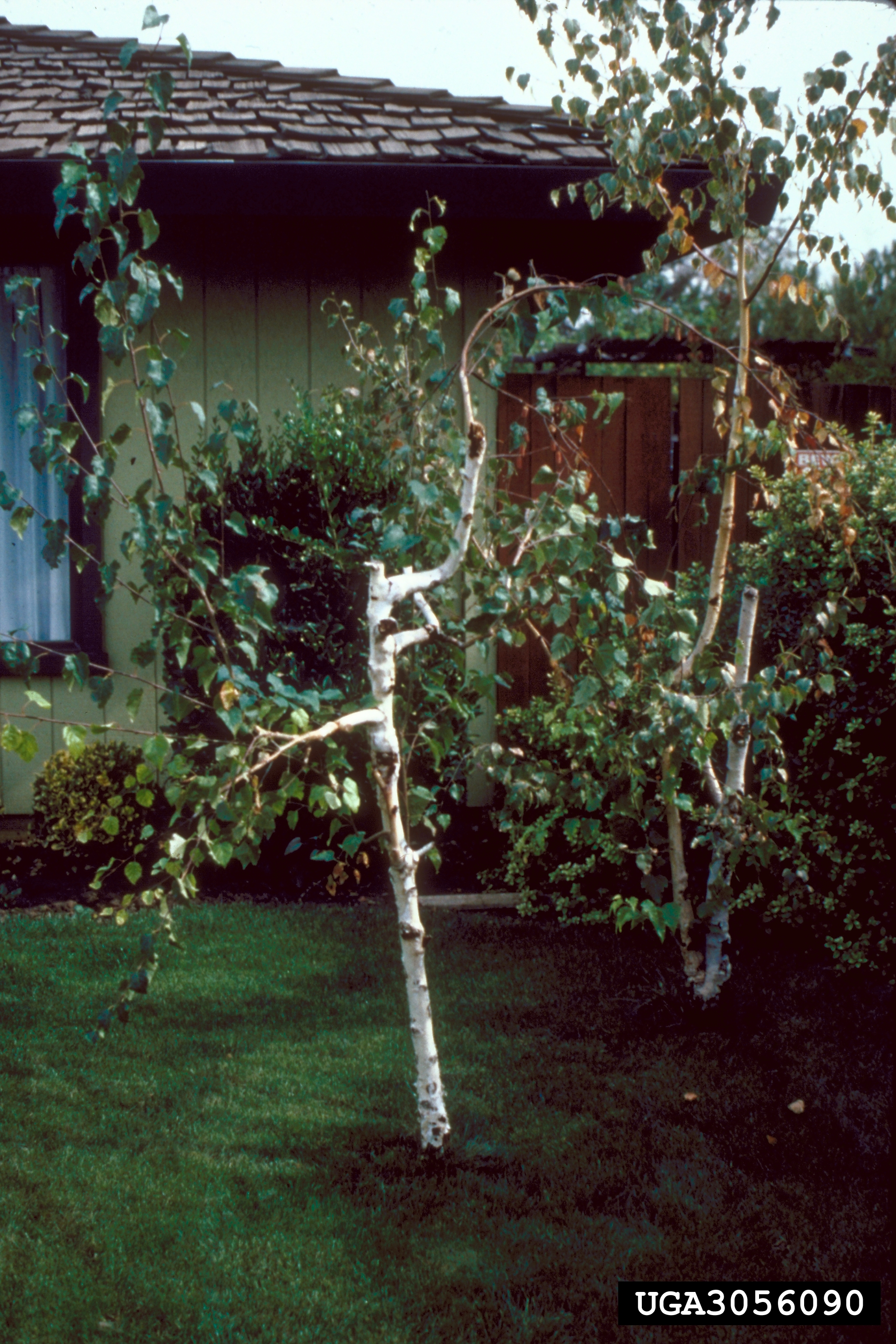
Damage

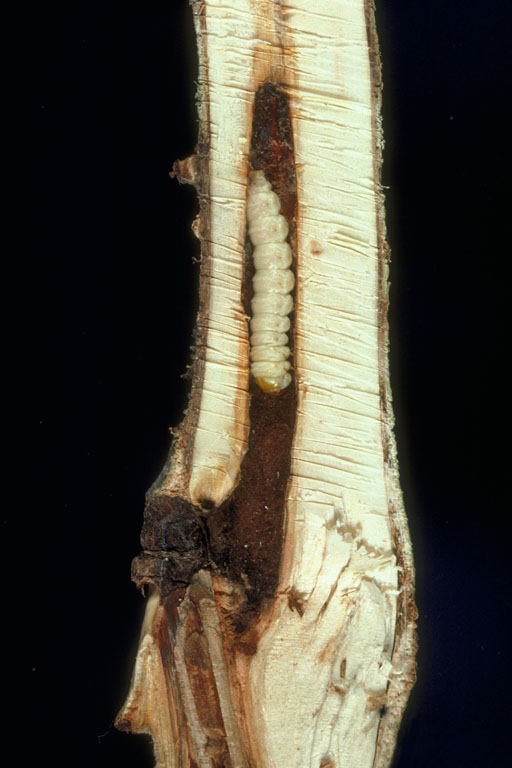
Larva
