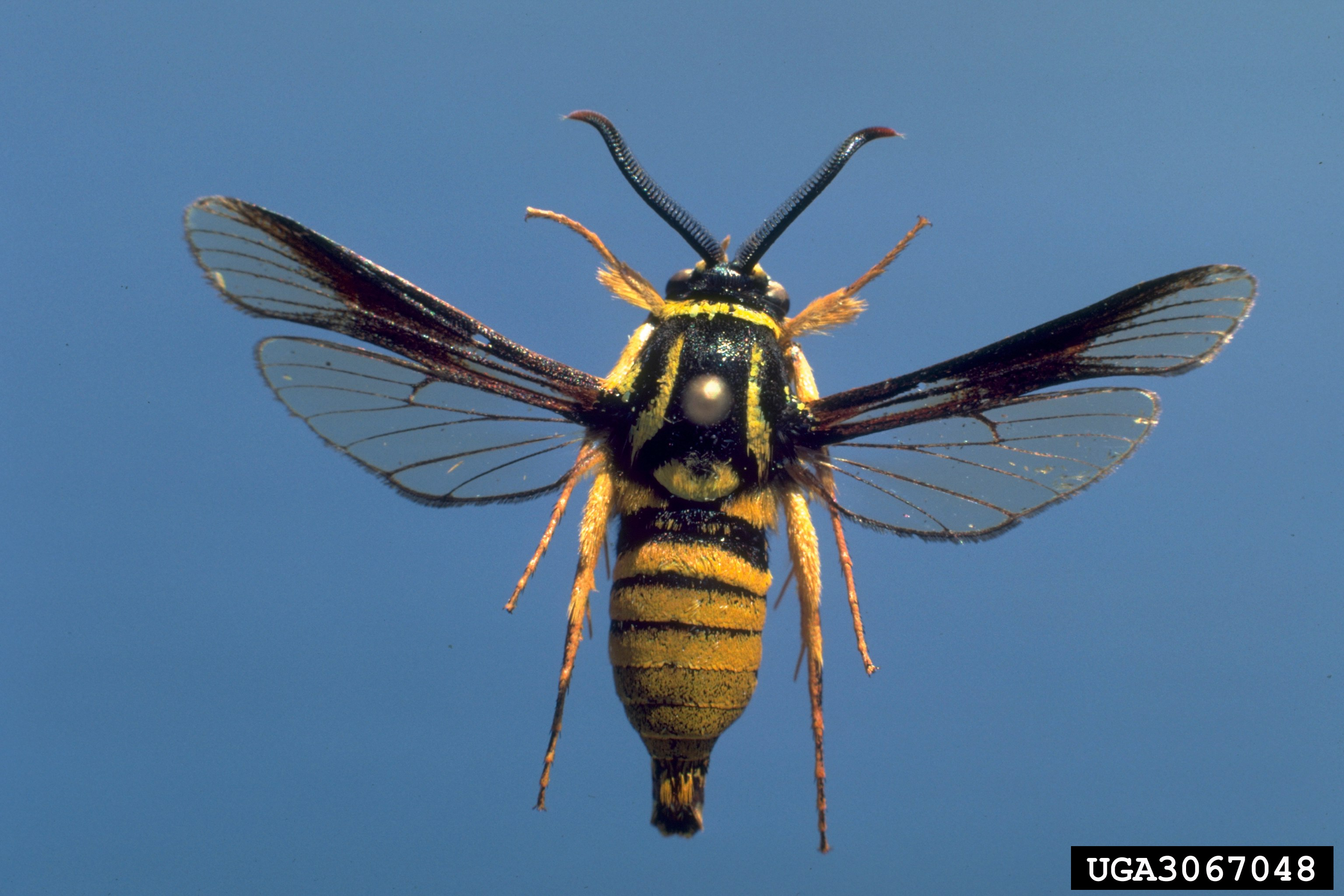

Scientific classification
- Kingdom: Animalia
- Phylum: Arthropoda
- Class: Insecta
- Order: Lepidoptera
- Family: Sesiidae
- Genus: Paranthrene
- Species: P. simulans

Binomial name
- Paranthrene simulans (Grote, 1881)

Synonyms
- Sciapteron simulans Grote, 1881; Trochilium simulans; Fatua palmii (Edwards, 1887); Trochilium luggeri (Edwards, 1891)

= Paranthrene simulans =

Species of moth

Paranthrene simulans, the red oak clearwing borer, hornet clearwing or oak clearwing borer, is a moth of the family Sesiidae. It is found in eastern North America, from Nova Scotia to Florida, west to Minnesota, Missouri and Mississippi.

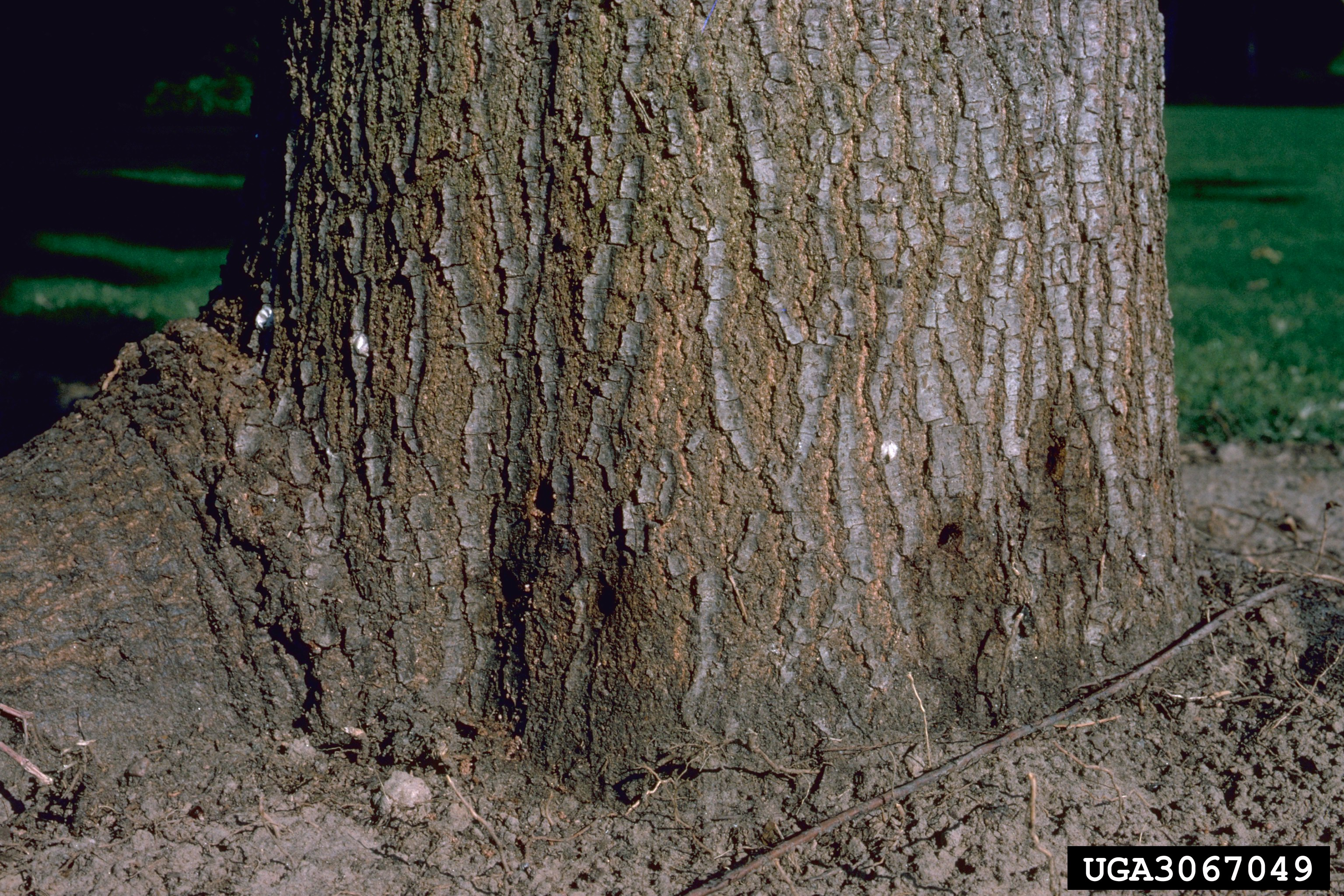
Damage

The wingspan is 27–40 mm. Adults emerge during June and July.

The larvae feed on chestnuts and oaks (including red and white oaks). They have a two-year life cycle.
