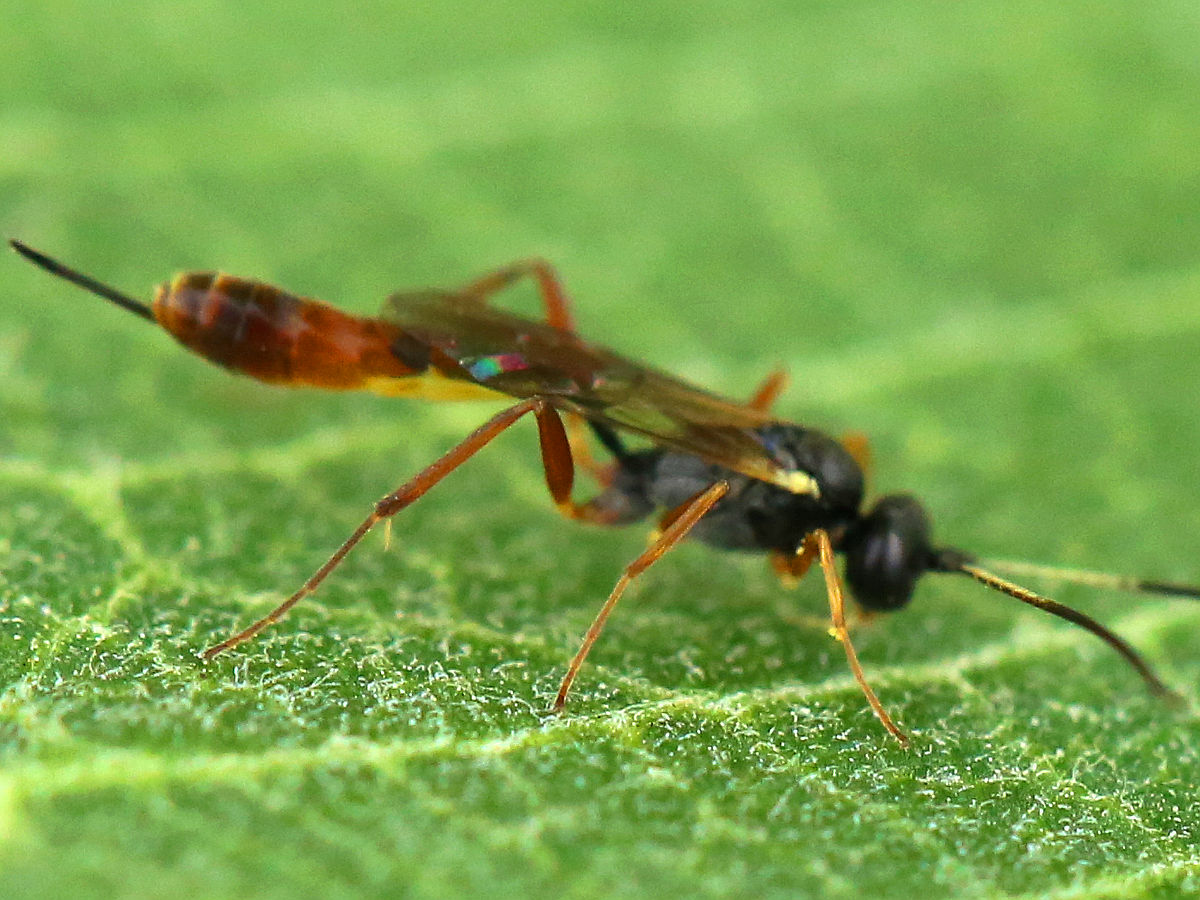
- Female Cymodusa distincta

Scientific classification
- Kingdom: Animalia
- Phylum: Arthropoda
- Class: Insecta
- Order: Hymenoptera
- Family: Ichneumonidae
- Subfamily: Campopleginae
- Tribe: Limneriini
- Genus: Cymodusa; Holmgren, 1858

Species
- Several, including: Cymodusa antennator (Holmgren, 1855); Cymodusa cruentata (Gravenhorst, 1829); Cymodusa distincta Cresson, 1864; Cymodusa exilis Holmgren, 1860; Cymodusa flavjpes Brischke, 1880; Cymodusa fusciata (Bridgman & Fitch, 1885); Cymodusa leucocera Holmgren, 1859

Synonyms
- Diverdusa (Dbar, 1985); Sagaritis (Holmgren, 1859); Sagaritopsis (Hincks, 1944); Thersitia (Schmiedeknecht, 1907)

= Cymodusa =

Genus of wasps

Cymodusa is a genus of parasitoid wasps in the family Ichneumonidae.

Names brought to synonymy

- Cymodusa elegans Szepligeti, 1901, a synonym for Nemeritis elegans
