= Meloboris islandica =

Scientific classification
- Kingdom: Animalia
- Phylum: Arthropoda
- Class: Insecta
- Order: Hymenoptera
- Family: Ichneumonidae
- Genus: Meloboris
- Species: M. islandica

Binomial name
- Meloboris islandica Holmgren, 1859

Species of wasp

Meloboris islandica is a parasitoid wasp belonging to the Hymenoptera order and the Ichneumonidae family. The scientific name of the species was first validly published by Hinz in 1969.
