= Campoletis sonorensis =

Scientific classification
- Kingdom: Animalia
- Phylum: Arthropoda
- Class: Insecta
- Order: Hymenoptera
- Family: Ichneumonidae
- Genus: Campoletis
- Species: C. sonorensis

Binomial name
- Campoletis sonorensis Cameron, 1886

Species of wasp

Campoletis sonorensis is a species of parasitoid ichneumonid wasp found in much of the Americas, including the United States, Brazil, and Chile. Hosts include Spodoptera frugiperda, Spodoptera exigua, Helicoverpa, and Chrysodeixis includens.
