= Paranthrene dukei =

Scientific classification
- Kingdom: Animalia
- Phylum: Arthropoda
- Clade: Pancrustacea
- Class: Insecta
- Order: Lepidoptera
- Family: Sesiidae
- Genus: Paranthrene
- Species: P. dukei

Binomial name
- Paranthrene dukei Bartsch, 2008

Species of moth

Paranthrene dukei is a moth of the family Sesiidae. It is known from Zimbabwe.
