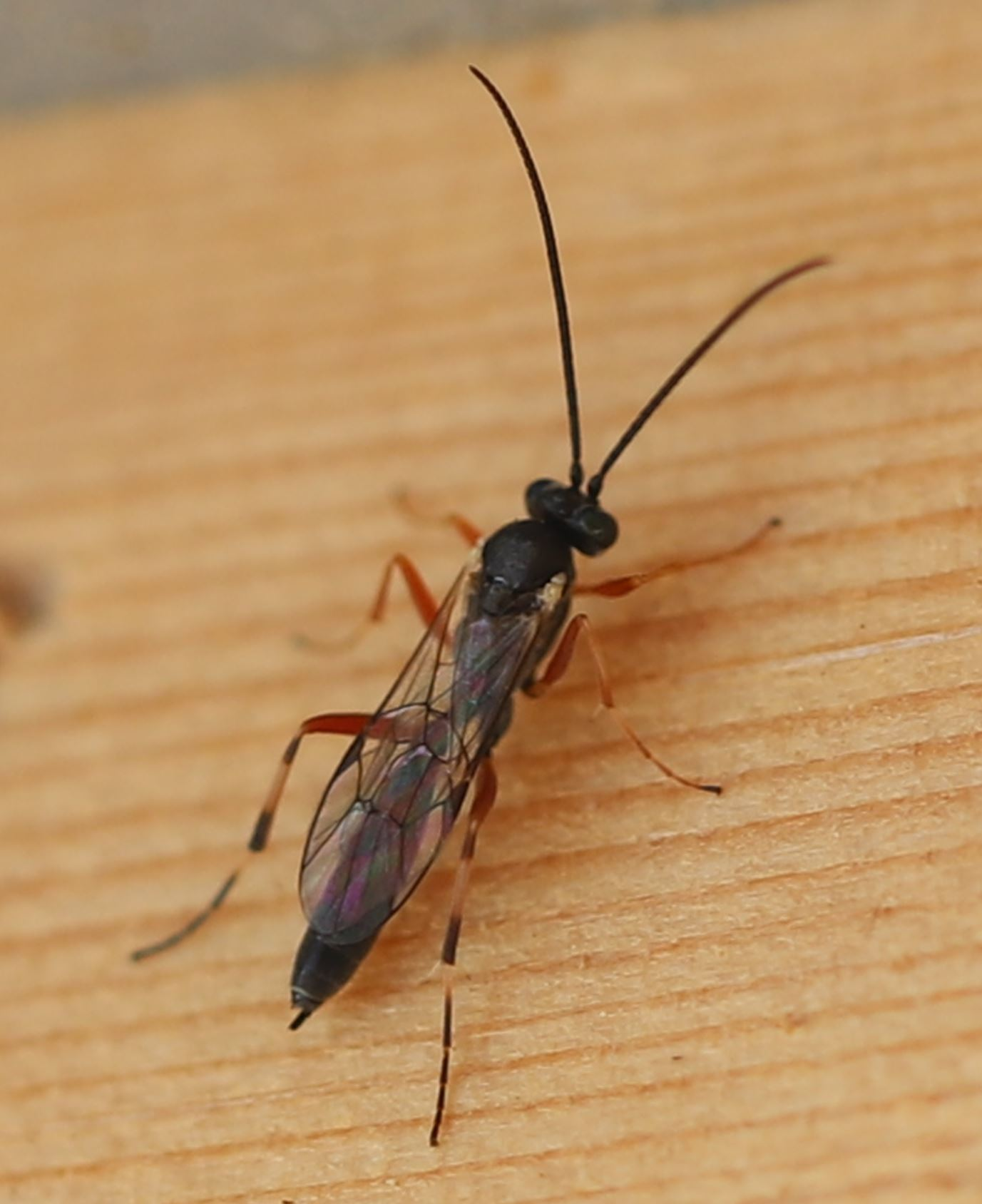
- Hyposoter didymator

Scientific classification
- Domain: Eukaryota
- Kingdom: Animalia
- Phylum: Arthropoda
- Class: Insecta
- Order: Hymenoptera
- Family: Ichneumonidae
- Subfamily: Campopleginae
- Genus: Hyposoter; Förster, 1869

= Hyposoter =

Genus of wasps

Hyposoter is a large cosmopolitan genus of parasitoid wasps belonging to the family Ichneumonidae.

The genus has cosmopolitan distribution.

== Selected species ==
- Hyposoter affinis (Cresson, 1864)
- Hyposoter albicans (Brischke, 1880)
- Hyposoter didymator (Thunberg, 1822)
- Hyposoter dimidiatus (Ashmead, 1894)
- Hyposoter discedens (Schmiedeknecht, 1909)
- Hyposoter disippi (Viereck, 1925)
- Hyposoter distriangulum Chen, Huang & Hsu, 2017
- Hyposoter dolosus (Gravenhorst, 1829)
- Hyposoter ebeninus (Gravenhorst, 1829)
- Hyposoter ebenitor Aubert, 1972
- Hyposoter erythrinus (Viereck, 1925)
- Hyposoter exiguae (Viereck, 1912)
- Hyposoter fitchii (Bridgman, 1881)
- Hyposoter formosanus (Uchida, 1932)
- Hyposoter forticarinatus (Cameron, 1906)
- Hyposoter frigidus (Lundbeck, 1897)
- Hyposoter fugitivus (Say, 1835)
- Hyposoter fuscitarsus (Viereck, 1925)
- Hyposoter galvestonensis (Viereck, 1906)
- Hyposoter grahami (Viereck, 1925)
- Hyposoter himalayensis (Cameron, 1906)
- Hyposoter horticola (Gravenhorst, 1829)
- Hyposoter inareolator Aubert, 1971
- Hyposoter indicus (Cameron, 1899)
- Hyposoter inquinatus (Holmgren, 1860)
- Hyposoter jachontovi (Meyer, 1927)
- Hyposoter juanianus (Roman, 1920)
- Hyposoter leucomerus (Thomson, 1887)
- Hyposoter longulus (Thomson, 1887)
- Hyposoter luctus (Davis, 1898)
- Hyposoter lymantriae Cushman, 1927
- Hyposoter maculatus (Hedwig, 1938)
- Hyposoter masoni Torgersen, 1985
- Hyposoter meridionalis (Smits van Burgst, 1914)
- Hyposoter nefastus (Cresson, 1874)
- Hyposoter neglectus (Holmgren, 1860)
- Hyposoter niger (Brulle, 1846)
- Hyposoter nigrior Aubert, 1993
- Hyposoter nigritarsis (Kriechbaumer, 1894)
- Hyposoter nigritus (Holmgren, 1860)
- Hyposoter nigrolineatus (Viereck, 1912)
- Hyposoter nigromaculatus (Strobl, 1904)
- Hyposoter noctuae (Ashmead, 1890)
- Hyposoter notatus (Gravenhorst, 1829)
- Hyposoter obliquus (Seyrig, 1935)
- Hyposoter obscurellus (Holmgren, 1860)
- Hyposoter occidentalis (Viereck, 1925)
- Hyposoter orbator (Gravenhorst, 1829)
- Hyposoter pallidirostris (Schmiedeknecht, 1909)
- Hyposoter pallipes (Smits van Burgst, 1912)
- Hyposoter parorgyiae (Viereck, 1910)
- Hyposoter pectinatus (Thomson, 1887)
- Hyposoter placidus (Desvignes, 1856)
- Hyposoter planatus (Viereck, 1925)
- Hyposoter plesius (Viereck, 1925)
- Hyposoter popofensis (Ashmead, 1902)
- Hyposoter porteri Brethes, 1913
- Hyposoter postcaedator Aubert, 1964
- Hyposoter posticae (Sonan, 1929)
- Hyposoter praecaedator Aubert, 1963
- Hyposoter prinzi (Meyer, 1926)
- Hyposoter prolixus (Holmgren, 1860)
- Hyposoter raoi Gupta, 1987
- Hyposoter rapacitor Aubert, 1971
- Hyposoter reunionis (Benoit, 1957)
- Hyposoter rhodocerae (Rondani, 1877)
- Hyposoter rivalis (Cresson, 1872)
- Hyposoter romani Ozols, 1959
- Hyposoter rubiginosus Cushman, 1924
- Hyposoter rubraniger (Lopez Cristobal, 1947)
- Hyposoter ruficrus (Thomson, 1887)
- Hyposoter rufiventris (Perez, 1895)
- Hyposoter rufovariatus (Schmiedeknecht, 1909)
- Hyposoter sanguinator Aubert, 1960
- Hyposoter seniculus (Gravenhorst, 1829)
- Hyposoter sicarius (Gravenhorst, 1829)
- Hyposoter simlaensis (Cameron, 1905)
- Hyposoter singularis (Schmiedeknecht, 1909)
- Hyposoter synchlorae (Ashmead, 1898)
- Hyposoter taihorinensis (Uchida, 1932)
- Hyposoter takagii (Matsumura, 1926)
- Hyposoter tenuicosta (Thomson, 1887)
- Hyposoter thuringiacus (Schmiedeknecht, 1909)
- Hyposoter tianshuiensis Sheng, 2004
- Hyposoter tibialis (Hedwig, 1938)
- Hyposoter tricolor (Ratzeburg, 1844)
- Hyposoter tricoloripes (Viereck, 1911)
- Hyposoter validus (Pfankuch, 1921)
- Hyposoter ventralis (Walker, 1874)
- Hyposoter vierecki Townes, Momoi & Townes, 1965
- Hyposoter virginalis (Gravenhorst, 1829)
- Hyposoter vividus (Holmgren, 1860)
- Hyposoter volens (Cameron, 1899)
- Hyposoter xanthocerus (Viereck, 1921)
