= Enytus =

Scientific classification
- Domain: Eukaryota
- Kingdom: Animalia
- Phylum: Arthropoda
- Class: Insecta
- Order: Hymenoptera
- Family: Ichneumonidae
- Genus: Enytus; Cameron, 1905

Genus of insects

Enytus is a genus of parasitoid wasps belonging to the family Ichneumonidae.

The species of this genus are found in Europe and North America.

Species:

- Enytus albipes (Provancher, 1888)
- Enytus alticola (Cushman, 1922)
- Enytus apostata (Gravenhorst, 1829)
- Enytus appositor (Aubert, 1970)
- Enytus arabicus (Horstmann, 1981)
- Enytus crataegellae (Thomson, 1887)
- Enytus ericeti (Horstmann, 1980)
- Enytus eureka (Ashmead, 1890)
- Enytus homonymator (Aubert, 1960)
- Enytus huet Rousse & Villemant, 2012
- Enytus madeirae (Horstmann, 1980)
- Enytus montanus (Ashmead, 1890)
- Enytus neoapostata (Horstmann, 1969)
- Enytus nitidiventris (Horstmann, 1980)
- Enytus obliteratus (Cresson, 1864)
- Enytus oculus (Viereck, 1925)
- Enytus parvicanda (Thomson, 1887)
- Enytus rufoapicalis Horstmann, 2004
- Enytus styriacus (Horstmann, 1980)
