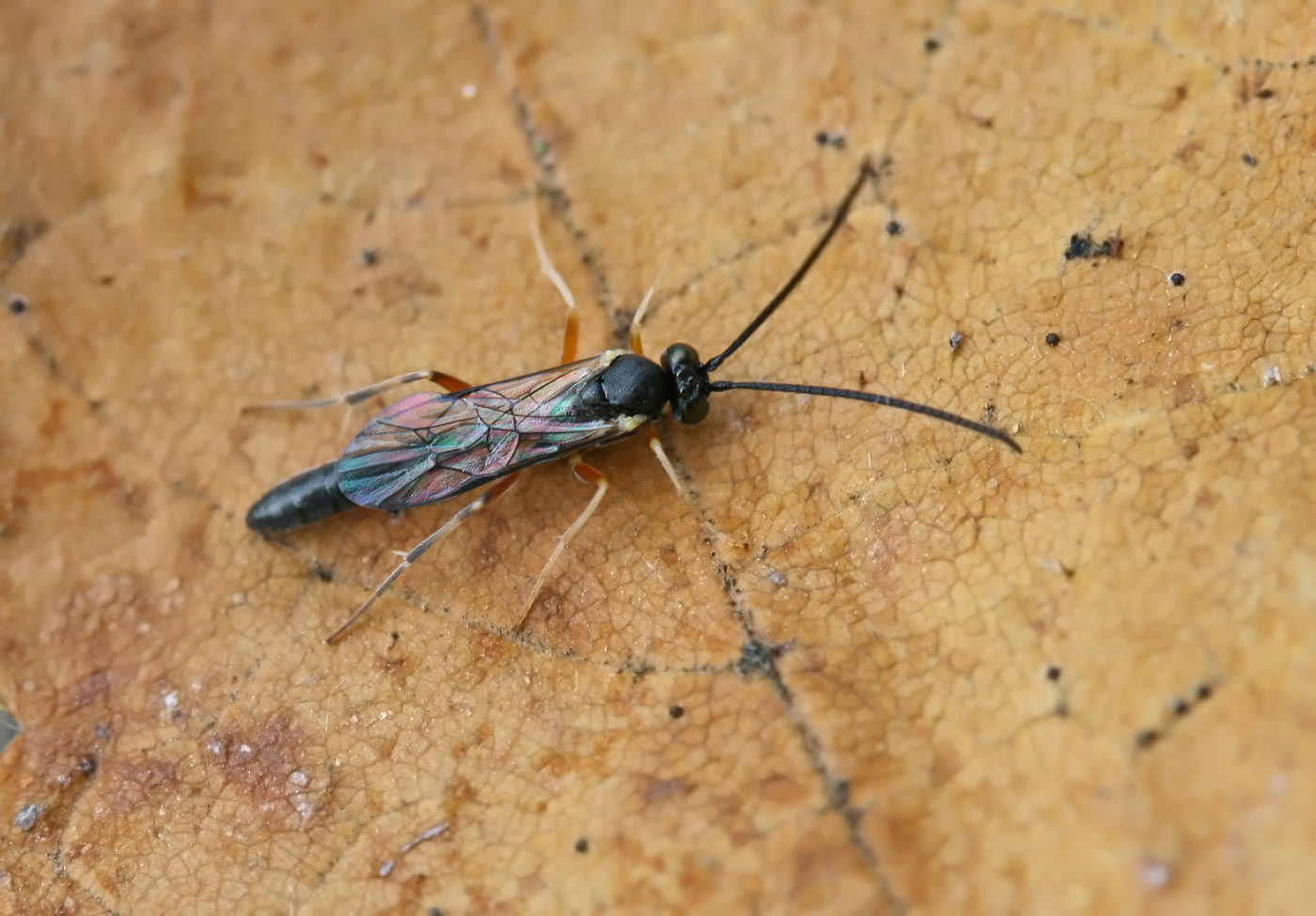
- Alcima orbitale

Scientific classification
- Domain: Eukaryota
- Kingdom: Animalia
- Phylum: Arthropoda
- Class: Insecta
- Order: Hymenoptera
- Family: Ichneumonidae
- Subfamily: Campopleginae
- Genus: Alcima; Förster, 1869

= Alcima =

Genus of insects

Alcima is a genus of parasitoid wasps belonging to the family Ichneumonidae and the subfamily Campopleginae.

The genus is known from the Palearctic region.

== Species ==
Three species are currently recognized.

- Alcima dbari Khalaim, 2007
- Alcima orbitale (Gravenhorst, 1829)
- Alcima pictor Aubert, 1971
