= Nemeritis elegans =

Scientific classification
- Kingdom: Animalia
- Phylum: Arthropoda
- Class: Insecta
- Order: Hymenoptera
- Family: Ichneumonidae
- Genus: Nemeritis
- Species: N. elegans

Binomial name
- Nemeritis elegans (Szepligeti, 1901)

Synonyms
- Cymodusa elegans Szepligeti, 1901; Nemeritis bafai (Gregor, 1940)

Species of wasp

Nemeritis elegans is a species of ichneumon wasps found in Europe.
