= Porizon =

Scientific classification
- Kingdom: Animalia
- Phylum: Arthropoda
- Clade: Pancrustacea
- Class: Insecta
- Order: Hymenoptera
- Family: Ichneumonidae
- Genus: Porizon; Fallen, 1813

Genus of insects

Porizon is a genus of parasitoid wasps belonging to the family Ichneumonidae.

The species of this genus are found in Europe and Northern America.

Species:

- Porizon agilis Cresson
- Porizon albistriae (Horstmann, 1987)
