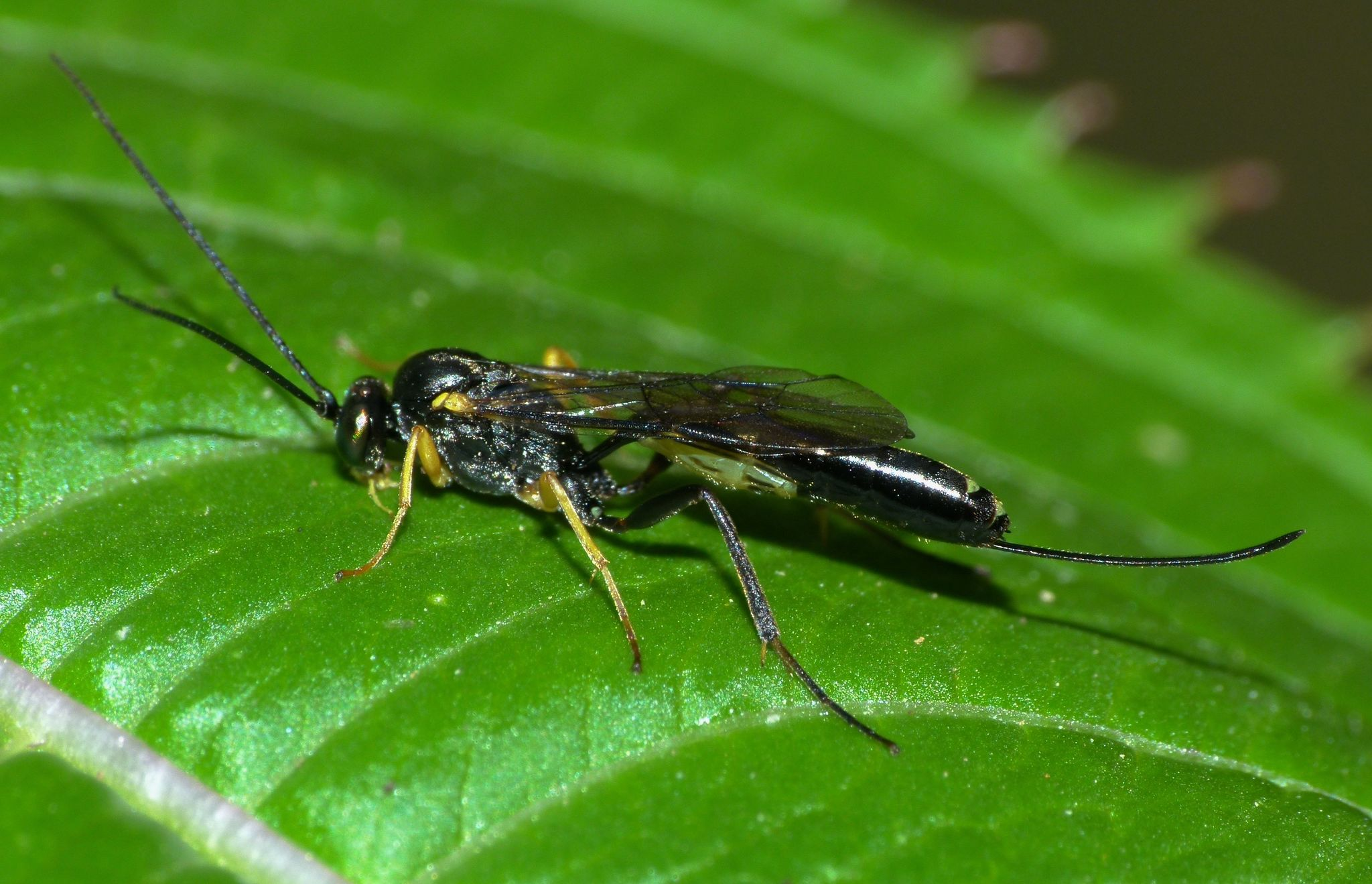

Scientific classification
- Kingdom: Animalia
- Phylum: Arthropoda
- Clade: Pancrustacea
- Class: Insecta
- Order: Hymenoptera
- Family: Ichneumonidae
- Tribe: Campoplegini
- Genus: Campoplex; Gravenhorst, 1829

Type species
- Ichneumon difformis Gmelin, 1790

Species
- many, including: Campoplex difformis

= Campoplex =

Genus of wasps

Campoplex is a genus of parasitic wasps in the tribe Campoplegini.

== Taxonomy ==
Former species

- Dusona elegans (as Campoplex elegans)
