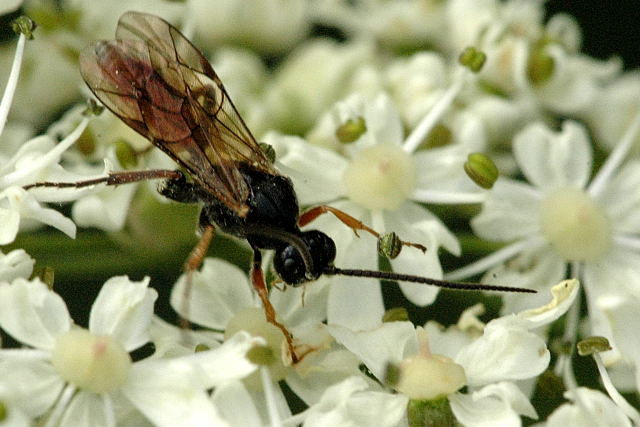

Scientific classification
- Kingdom: Animalia
- Phylum: Arthropoda
- Class: Insecta
- Order: Hymenoptera
- Family: Ichneumonidae
- Subfamily: Campopleginae
- Genus: Olesicampe; Forster, 1869

= Olesicampe =

Genus of ichneumon wasps

Olesicampe is a genus of ichneumon wasps in the family Ichneumonidae. There are at least 130 described species in Olesicampe.

== See also ==
- List of Olesicampe species
