= Paranthrene tabaniformis =

Scientific classification
- Domain: Eukaryota
- Kingdom: Animalia
- Phylum: Arthropoda
- Class: Insecta
- Order: Lepidoptera
- Family: Sesiidae
- Genus: Paranthrene
- Species: P. tabaniformis

Binomial name
- Paranthrene tabaniformis (Rottemburg, 1775)

Synonyms
- Sphinx tabaniformis Rottemburg, 1775; Sphinx asiliformis [Denis & Schiffermüller] 1775 (nec Rottemburg, 1775); Sphinx sesia Gmelin, 1790; Sphinx rhingiaeformis Hübner, 1790; Sesia crabroniformis Laspeyres, 1801 (nec Fabricius, 1793, nec Lewin, 1797); Aegeria tricincta Harris, 1839 (nec Moore, 1879, nec Wileman & South, 1918); Sesia serratiformis Freyer, 1842; Albuna denotata Edwards, 1882; Albuna denotata f. sangaica Bartel, 1912; Albuna denotata f. annulifera Closs, 1920; Albuna denotata f. oslari Engelhardt, 1946; Sphinx vespiformis Newman, 1832 (nec Linnaeus, 1761); Sciapteron kungessana Alpheraky, 1882; Sesia synagriformis Rambur, 1866; Paranthrene tabaniformis synagriformis var. intermedia Le Cerf, 1916

Species of moth

Paranthrene tabaniformis, the dusky clearwing, is a moth of the family Sesiidae. It is found in the Palearctic and Nearctic realms.

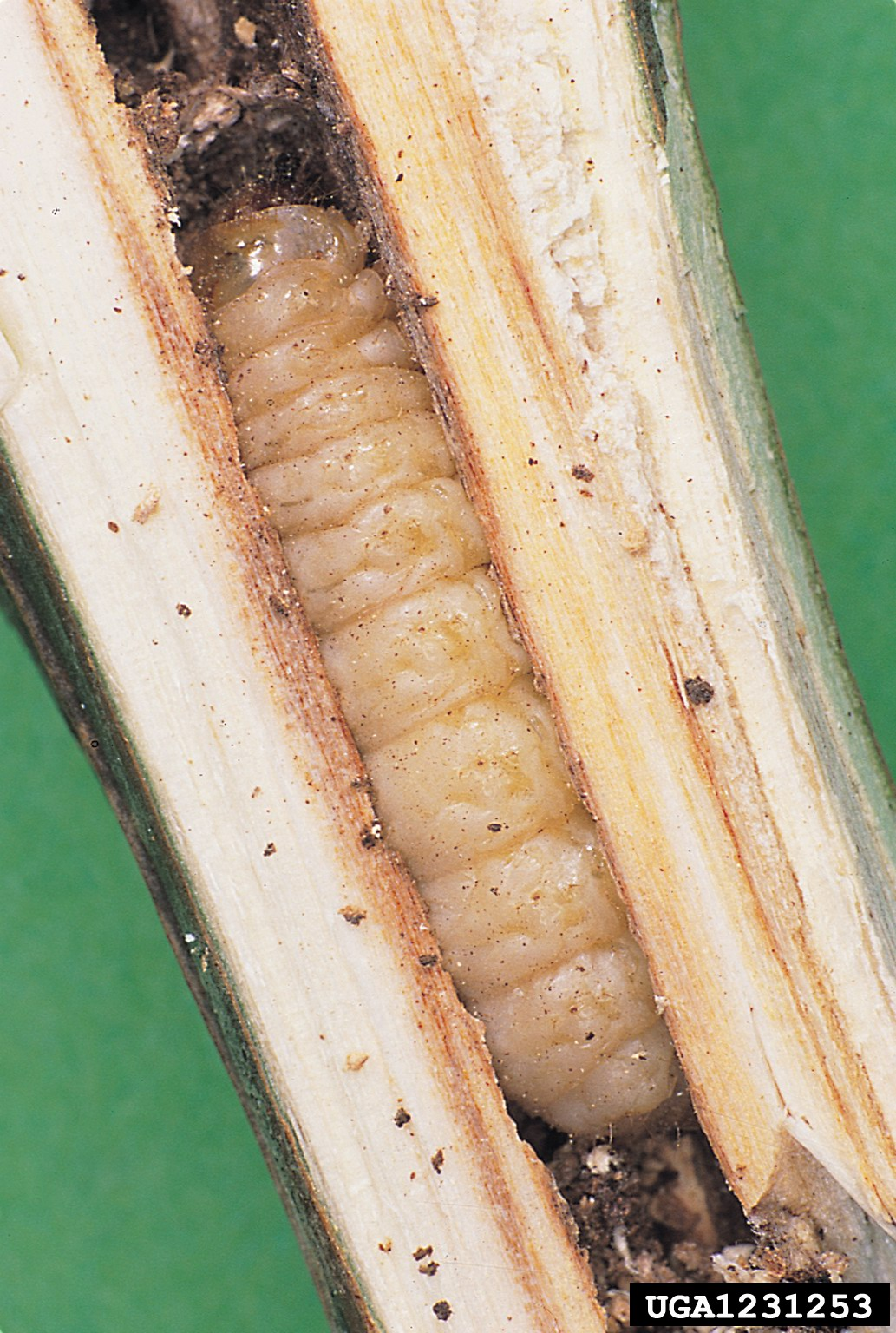
Larva

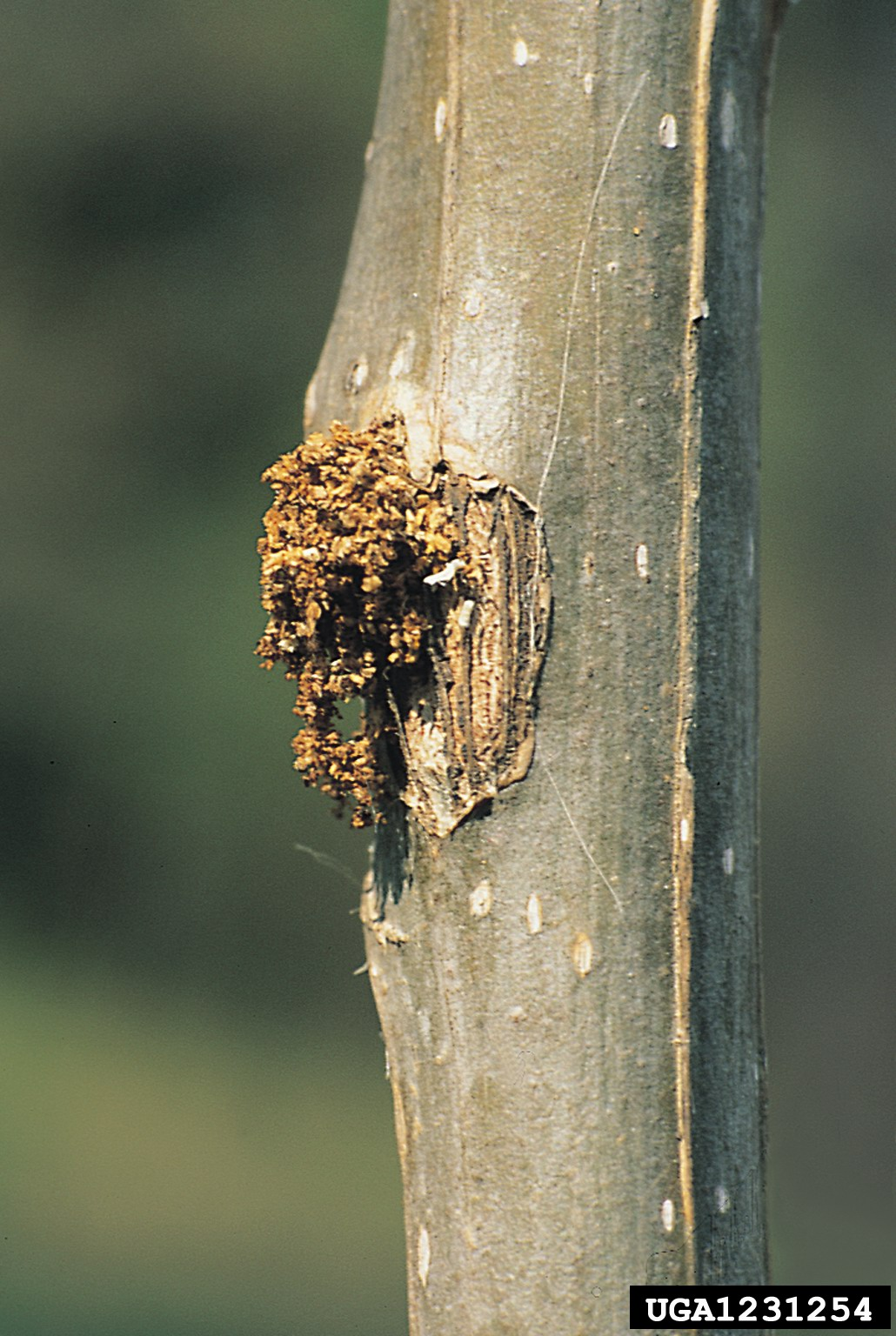
Exit hole

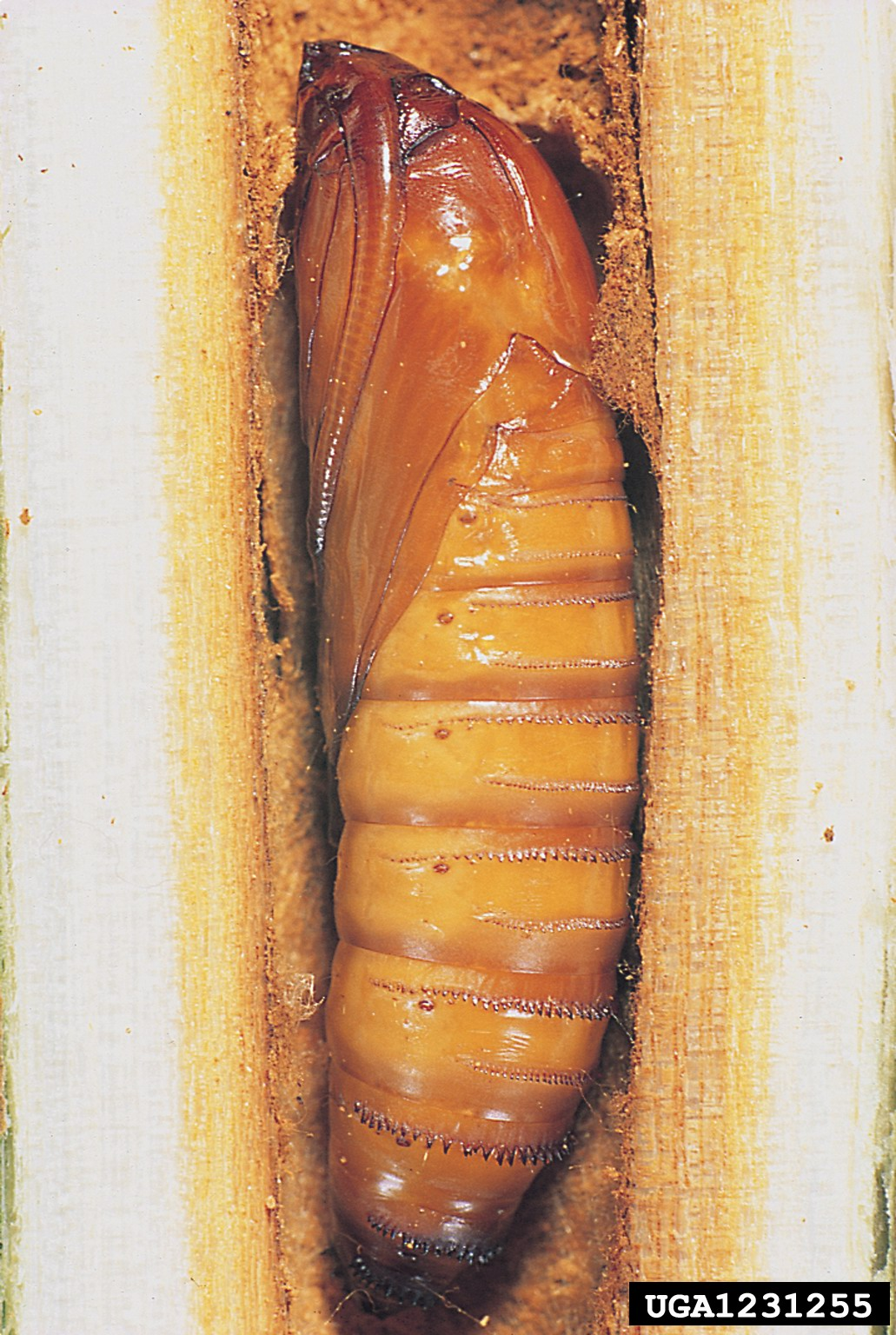
Pupa

The wingspan is c. 30 mm. The length of the forewings is c. 14 mm. Meyrick describes it - Head with white vertical bar before each eye, and yellow posterior ring. Abdomen with yellow rings on 2, 4, 6, and sometimes 7. Middle and posterior tibiae orange, blackbanded. Forewings rather dark fuscous, with elongate obscure hyaline patch towards base; costal streak violet-blackish. Hindwings hyaline; veins and termen dark fuscous. The moth flies from May to August depending on the location.

The larvae feed on poplar and willow, as well as sea-buckthorn.

The larvae have 6-7 stages. Mature larvae pupate in chambers within larval galleries. The pupae are found in the center of one-year poplar seedlings, or beneath the bark of stems and branches in the oldest trees.

Adults are effective fliers, though little is known about the flight distances of adult female P. tabaniformis.

P. tabaniformis resemble wasps, possibly as Batesian mimicry.

== Subspecies ==
- Paranthrene tabaniformis tabaniformis
- Paranthrene tabaniformis kungessana (Alpheraky, 1882)
- Paranthrene tabaniformis synagriformis (Rambur, 1866)
