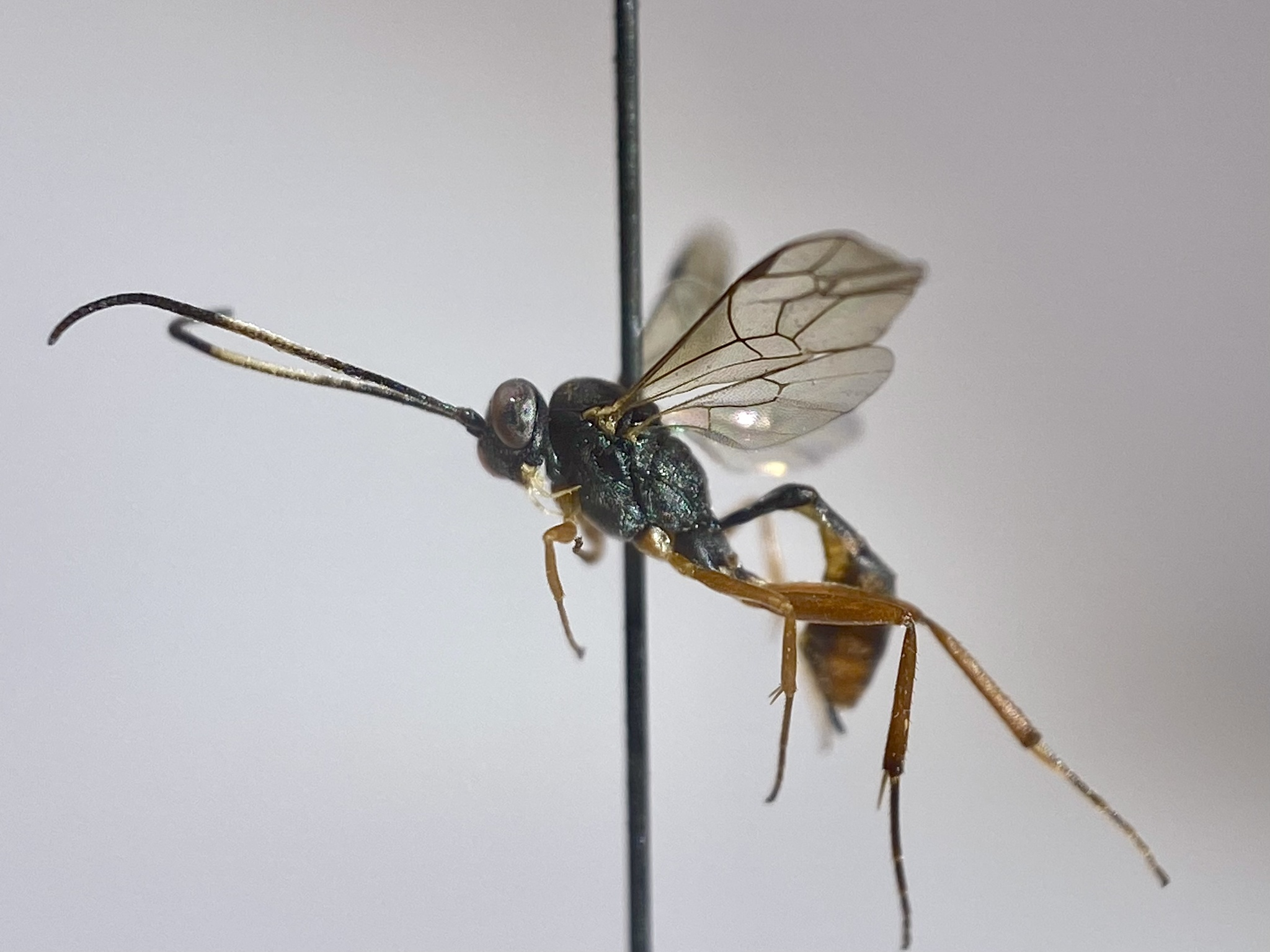
- Callidora albovincta

Scientific classification
- Domain: Eukaryota
- Kingdom: Animalia
- Phylum: Arthropoda
- Class: Insecta
- Order: Hymenoptera
- Family: Ichneumonidae
- Subfamily: Campopleginae
- Genus: Callidora; Förster, 1869

= Callidora =

Genus of insects

Callidora is a genus of parasitoid wasps belonging to the family Ichneumonidae and the subfamily Campopleginae. It is relatively species poor, with only five recognized species.

The genus has an almost cosmopolitan distribution.

== Description ==
Much like in other Campopleginae is the metasoma laterally compressed and the tip of the ovipositor notched. Clypeus small, mandibles and cheeks short. Eyes bare. Spurs hind tibiae reach the middle of the first segment of hind tarsus. Areola on propodeum small, hexagonal but open behind. Areolet of the wings present, second recurrent vein leaving near its middle. Nervellus intercepted. First tergite with a very weak glymma. Females of some species have a distinctive white ring on the antennae. Head and thorax black, metasoma usually red with black markings.

== Species ==
- Callidora albovincta (Holmgren, 1860)
- Callidora analis (Gravenhorst, 1829)
- Callidora atrognatha Gupta & Gupta, 1977
- Callidora surata Tigner, 1969
- Callidora tegularis Tigner, 1969
