= Nonnus (wasp) =

Scientific classification
- Domain: Eukaryota
- Kingdom: Animalia
- Phylum: Arthropoda
- Class: Insecta
- Order: Hymenoptera
- Family: Ichneumonidae
- Subfamily: Nonninae; Quicke, Fitton, Broad, Crocker, Laurenne, and Ismail, 2005
- Tribe: Nonnini; Townes, 1961
- Genus: Nonnus; Cresson, 1874

Genus of wasps

Nonnus is a genus of parasitic wasps in the family Ichneumonidae. It is the type and only genus of the tribe Nonnini and the subfamily Nonninae.

Species include:

- Nonnus antennatus Cresson, 1874
- Nonnus atratus Cresson, 1874
- Nonnus bicolor (Schmiedeknecht, 1908)
- Nonnus brethesi Townes, 1966
- Nonnus hastulatus (Brues & Richardson, 1913)
- Nonnus nigrans (Brues & Richardson, 1913)
- Nonnus punctulatus (Szepligeti, 1916)
- Nonnus rufithorax (Szepligeti, 1916)
- Nonnus rufus (Schmiedeknecht, 1908)
- Nonnus tornator (Fabricius, 1804)
