= Tranosema =

Scientific classification
- Domain: Eukaryota
- Kingdom: Animalia
- Phylum: Arthropoda
- Class: Insecta
- Order: Hymenoptera
- Family: Ichneumonidae
- Subfamily: Campopleginae
- Genus: Tranosema; Förster, 1869

Genus of insects

Tranosema is a genus of parasitoid wasps belonging to the family Ichneumonidae.

The species of this genus are found in Europe and North America.

Species:

- Tranosema atramentarium (Schmiedeknecht, 1909)
- Tranosema carbonellum (Thomson, 1887)
- Tranosema hyperboreum (Holmgren, 1860)
- Tranosema rostrale
