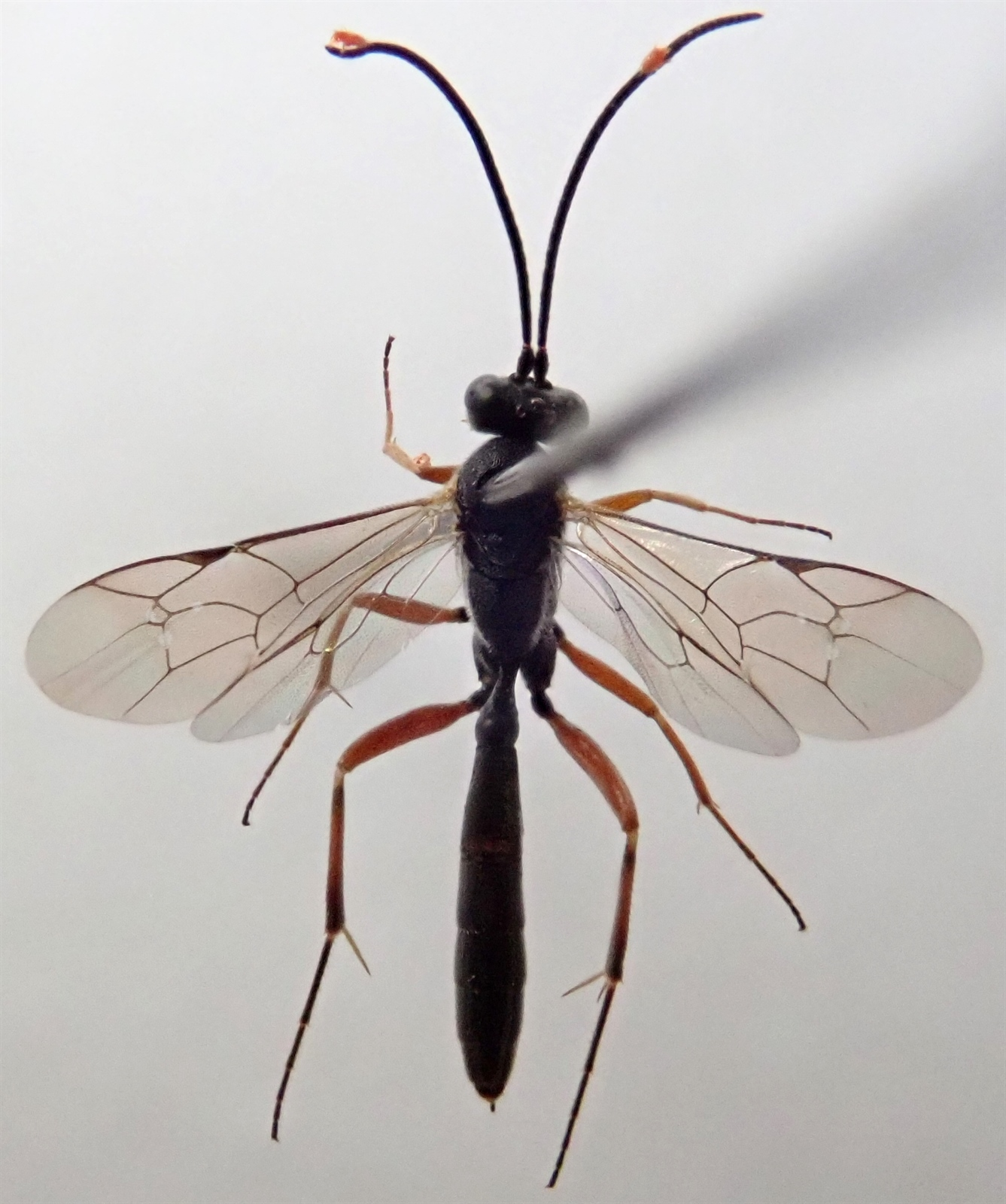
- Casinaria tenuiventris

Scientific classification
- Domain: Eukaryota
- Kingdom: Animalia
- Phylum: Arthropoda
- Class: Insecta
- Order: Hymenoptera
- Family: Ichneumonidae
- Subfamily: Campopleginae
- Tribe: Campoplegini
- Genus: Casinaria; Holmgren, 1859

= Casinaria =

Genus of wasps

Casinaria is a genus of parasitoid wasps belonging to the family Ichneumonidae.

The genus was first described by Holmgren in 1859.

The genus has cosmopolitan distribution.

Species:

- Casinaria affinis Tschek, 1871
- Casinaria affinisima Carlson, 1979
- Casinaria ajanta Maheshwary & Gupta, 1977
- Casinaria albibasalis Uchida, 1928
- Casinaria albifunda Han, van Achterberg & Chen, 2021
- Casinaria albipalpis (Gravenhorst, 1829)
- Casinaria albotibialis Kasparyan, 1976
- Casinaria alpina Thomson, 1887
- Casinaria amarilla Jerman & Gauld, 1988
- Casinaria ambigua (Townes, 1945)
- Casinaria arjuna Maheshwary & Gupta, 1977
- Casinaria artivultis Han, van Achterberg & Chen, 2021
- Casinaria ashimae Maheshwary & Gupta, 1977
- Casinaria atrata Morley, 1913
- Casinaria bangkhenensis Kusigemati, 1990
- Casinaria bonaerensis (Schrottky, 1902)
- Casinaria brachycera Vas, 2021
- Casinaria brasiliensis Brethes, 1927
- Casinaria buddha Maheshwary & Gupta, 1977
- Casinaria caliginea Vas, 2021
- Casinaria camura Vas, 2019
- Casinaria canadensis Walley, 1947
- Casinaria castanea Vas, 2020
- Casinaria cavigena Walley, 1947
- Casinaria coloradensis Walley, 1947
- Casinaria coloratilis Vas, 2020
- Casinaria compacta Maheshwary & Gupta, 1977
- Casinaria compressiventris Riedel, 2018
- Casinaria corrupta Walley, 1947
- Casinaria corvina Vas, 2021
- Casinaria crassiventris (Cameron, 1906)
- Casinaria cultellator Aubert, 1959
- Casinaria cylindrator Momoi, 1970
- Casinaria daitojimensis (Sonan, 1940)
- Casinaria dubia Tschek, 1871
- Casinaria ektypha Maheshwary & Gupta, 1977
- Casinaria elegantula Maheshwary & Gupta, 1977
- Casinaria eremica Jerman & Gauld, 1988
- Casinaria eupitheciae Viereck, 1912
- Casinaria excavator Aubert, 1963
- Casinaria exilis Han, van Achterberg & Chen, 2021
- Casinaria exiloides Han, van Achterberg & Chen, 2021
- Casinaria flagellator Riedel, 2018
- Casinaria flavicoxator Aubert, 1960
- Casinaria forcipata Walley, 1947
- Casinaria formosana Momoi, 1970
- Casinaria genuina (Norton, 1863)
- Casinaria geometrae Walley, 1947
- Casinaria graciliventris (Viereck, 1926)
- Casinaria grandis Walley, 1947
- Casinaria granula Maheshwary & Gupta, 1977
- Casinaria granulicoxis (Seyrig, 1935)
- Casinaria hei Han, van Achterberg & Chen, 2021
- Casinaria hesperiophaga Jerman & Gauld, 1988
- Casinaria hinzi Riedel, 2018
- Casinaria horstmanni Riedel, 2018
- Casinaria indubia (Morley, 1913)
- Casinaria infesta (Cresson, 1872)
- Casinaria insularis (Cresson, 1865)
- Casinaria ischnogaster Thomson, 1887
- Casinaria japonica Kusigemati, 1980
- Casinaria kittenbergeri Vas, 2020
- Casinaria kreichbaumeri (Costa, 1884)
- Casinaria lamellata Riedel, 2018
- Casinaria lamina (Viereck, 1921)
- Casinaria latericia Vas, 2020
- Casinaria legalis (Cresson, 1874)
- Casinaria lenticulata Maheshwary & Gupta, 1977
- Casinaria leo Maheshwary & Gupta, 1977
- Casinaria limenitidis (Howard, 1889)/
- Casinaria longiterebrae Maheshwary & Gupta, 1977
- Casinaria macerata (Cresson, 1874)
- Casinaria magdalia Maheshwary & Gupta, 1977
- Casinaria malaisei Maheshwary & Gupta, 1977
- Casinaria matsuyamensis (Uchida, 1928)
- Casinaria melanolophiae Walley, 1959
- Casinaria melasoma Han, van Achterberg & Chen, 2021
- Casinaria mellaclypea Maheshwary & Gupta, 1977
- Casinaria meridionalis(Turner, 1919)
- Casinaria meridionator Aubert, 1960
- Casinaria mesozosta (Gravenhorst, 1829)
- Casinaria micra Jerman & Gauld, 1988
- Casinaria minima (Morley, 1913)
- Casinaria moesta (Gravenhorst, 1829)
- Casinaria monticola Thomson, 1887
- Casinaria morionella Holmgren, 1860
- Casinaria mythologica Jerman & Gauld, 1988
- Casinaria natashae Maheshwary & Gupta, 1977
- Casinaria nigripes (Gravenhorst, 1829)
- Casinaria nigrotrochanterata Riedel, 2018
- Casinaria novoguineensis (Szepligeti, 1905)
- Casinaria onyx Vas, 2019
- Casinaria pallipes Brischke, 1880
- Casinaria papuensis Vas, 2020
- Casinaria paramorionella Riedel, 2018
- Casinaria partolstoyi Han, van Achterberg & Chen, 2021
- Casinaria parvicarinata (Cameron, 1906)
- Casinaria parvula Kriechbaumer, 1894
- Casinaria pavlova Jerman & Gauld, 1988
- Casinaria pedunculata (Szepligeti, 1908)
- Casinaria petiolaris (Gravenhorst, 1829)
- Casinaria philippina Maheshwary & Gupta, 1977
- Casinaria plusiae (Blanchard, 1947)
- Casinaria punctura Maheshwary & Gupta, 1977
- Casinaria pyreneator Aubert, 1960
- Casinaria remota Han, van Achterberg & Chen, 2021
- Casinaria rubens Vas, 2020
- Casinaria russea Vas, 2020
- Casinaria scabra Thomson, 1887
- Casinaria scabriformis Viereck, 1912
- Casinaria scalaris Vas, 2019
- Casinaria sellata Vas, 2020
- Casinaria semiothisae Walley, 1941
- Casinaria siccata Jerman & Gauld, 1988
- Casinaria simillima Maheshwary & Gupta, 1977
- Casinaria sordidata Maheshwary & Gupta, 1977
- Casinaria spec Aubert, 1960
- Casinaria stygia Tschek, 1871
- Casinaria subglabra Thomson, 1887
- Casinaria tegulata Riedel, 2018
- Casinaria tenuiceps Walley, 1947
- Casinaria tenuiventris (Gravenhorst, 1829)
- Casinaria terebrator Riedel, 2022
- Casinaria teshionis (Uchida, 1928)
- Casinaria tikari Maheshwary & Gupta, 1977
- Casinaria tolstoyi Maheshwary & Gupta, 1977
- Casinaria trochanterator Aubert, 1960
- Casinaria vadosa Walley, 1947
- Casinaria varians Tschek, 1871
- Casinaria varuni Maheshwary & Gupta, 1977
- Casinaria vesca Vas, 2020
- Casinaria virgata Jerman & Gauld, 1988
- Casinaria vitilevensis Kusigemati, 1985
- Casinaria woowonga Jerman & Gauld, 1988
- Casinaria xui Han, van Achterberg & Chen, 2021
