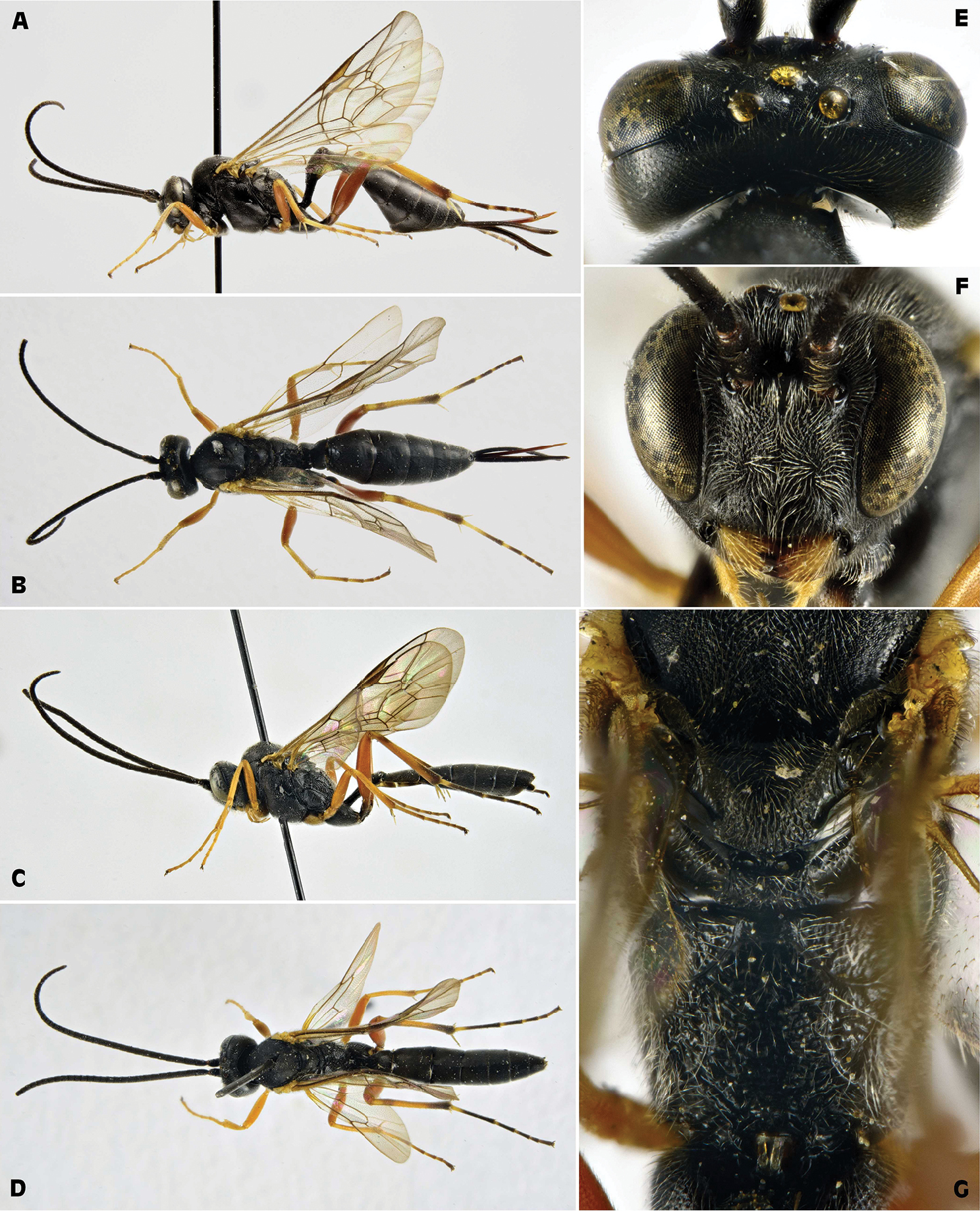
- Sinophorus turionum

Scientific classification
- Domain: Eukaryota
- Kingdom: Animalia
- Phylum: Arthropoda
- Class: Insecta
- Order: Hymenoptera
- Family: Ichneumonidae
- Genus: Sinophorus; Förster, 1869

= Sinophorus =

Genus of insects

Sinophorus is a genus of parasitoid wasps belonging to the family Ichneumonidae.

The species of this genus are found in Europe, Asia and North America.

Species:

- Sinophorus albidus (Gmelin, 1790)
- Sinophorus albipalpus Sanborne, 1984
- Sinophorus bazariae Sheng, 2015
- Sinophorus dioryctriae
- Sinophorus fuscicarpus (Thomson, 1887)
- Sinophorus latistrigis
- Sinophorus neimengensis
- Sinophorus runei
- Sinophorus xanthostomus (Gravenhorst, 1829)
