= Dolophron =

Scientific classification
- Kingdom: Animalia
- Phylum: Arthropoda
- Clade: Pancrustacea
- Class: Insecta
- Order: Hymenoptera
- Family: Ichneumonidae
- Genus: Dolophron; Förster, 1869

Genus of insects

Dolophron is a genus of parasitoid wasps belonging to the family Ichneumonidae.

The species of this genus are found in Europe.

Species:

- Dolophron nemorati Horstmann, 1978
- Dolophron pedella (Holmgren, 1860)
