= Benjaminia (wasp) =

Scientific classification
- Kingdom: Animalia
- Phylum: Arthropoda
- Class: Insecta
- Order: Hymenoptera
- Family: Ichneumonidae
- Genus: Benjaminia; Viereck, 1912

Genus of insects

Benjaminia is a genus of parasitoid wasps belonging to the family Ichneumonidae.

The species of this genus are found in North America.

Species:

- Benjaminia aridens Kasparyan, 1976
- Benjaminia carlsoni Wahl, 1989
