= Meloboris =

Scientific classification
- Domain: Eukaryota
- Kingdom: Animalia
- Phylum: Arthropoda
- Class: Insecta
- Order: Hymenoptera
- Family: Ichneumonidae
- Genus: Meloboris; Holmgren, 1859

Genus of insects

Meloboris is a genus of parasitoid wasps belonging to the family Ichneumonidae.

The species of this genus are found in Europe and North America.

Species:

- Meloboris alopha (Townes, 1970)
- Meloboris alternans (Gravenhorst, 1829)
- Meloboris basilaris (Provancher, 1875)
- Meloboris benevola (Gahan, 1914)
- Meloboris cingulata Horstmann, 2004
- Meloboris collector (Thunberg, 1822)
- Meloboris curticauda (Viereck, 1925)
- Meloboris dimicatellae Horstmann, 2004
- Meloboris fuscifemora (Graf, 1917)
- Meloboris gracilis Holmgren, 1859
- Meloboris helminda (Holmgren, 1868)
- Meloboris insularis Horstmann, 1980
- Meloboris islandica Hinz, 1969
- Meloboris leucaniae Kusigemati, 1972
- Meloboris longicauda Horstmann, 1980
- Meloboris marginata (Provancher, 1874)
- Meloboris miae Haraldseide, 2021
- Meloboris moldavica (Constantineanu & Mustata, 1972)
- Meloboris neglecta (Habermehl, 1923)
- Meloboris oblonga (Viereck, 1925)
- Meloboris orientalis Momoi, Kusigemati & Nakanishi, 1968
- Meloboris proxima (Perkins, 1942)
- Meloboris pseudocollector Haraldseide, 2021
- Meloboris sagittaria Vas, 2019
- Meloboris sidnica (Holmgren, 1868)
- Meloboris temporalis (Szepligeti, 1916)
- Meloboris unica (Viereck, 1926)
- Meloboris xylostellae Kusigemati, 1993
