= Eriborus =

Scientific classification
- Kingdom: Animalia
- Phylum: Arthropoda
- Clade: Pancrustacea
- Class: Insecta
- Order: Hymenoptera
- Family: Ichneumonidae
- Genus: Eriborus; Förster, 1869

Genus of insects

Eriborus is a genus of parasitoid wasps belonging to the family Ichneumonidae.

The genus has almost cosmopolitan distribution.

Species:

- Eriborus achalicus Dbar & Saparmamedova, 1988
- Eriborus acutulus Momoi, 1970
- Eriborus anomalus (Tosquinet, 1903) - found in Papua New Guinea
- Eriborus applicitus Sheng & Sun, 2006
- Eriborus elgonensis Vas, 2022 - found in Kenya
- Eriborus epiphyas Paull & Austin, 2006 - found in Australia
- Eriborus mirabilis - found in Papua New Guinea
- Eriborus terebrans (Gravenhorst 1829)
