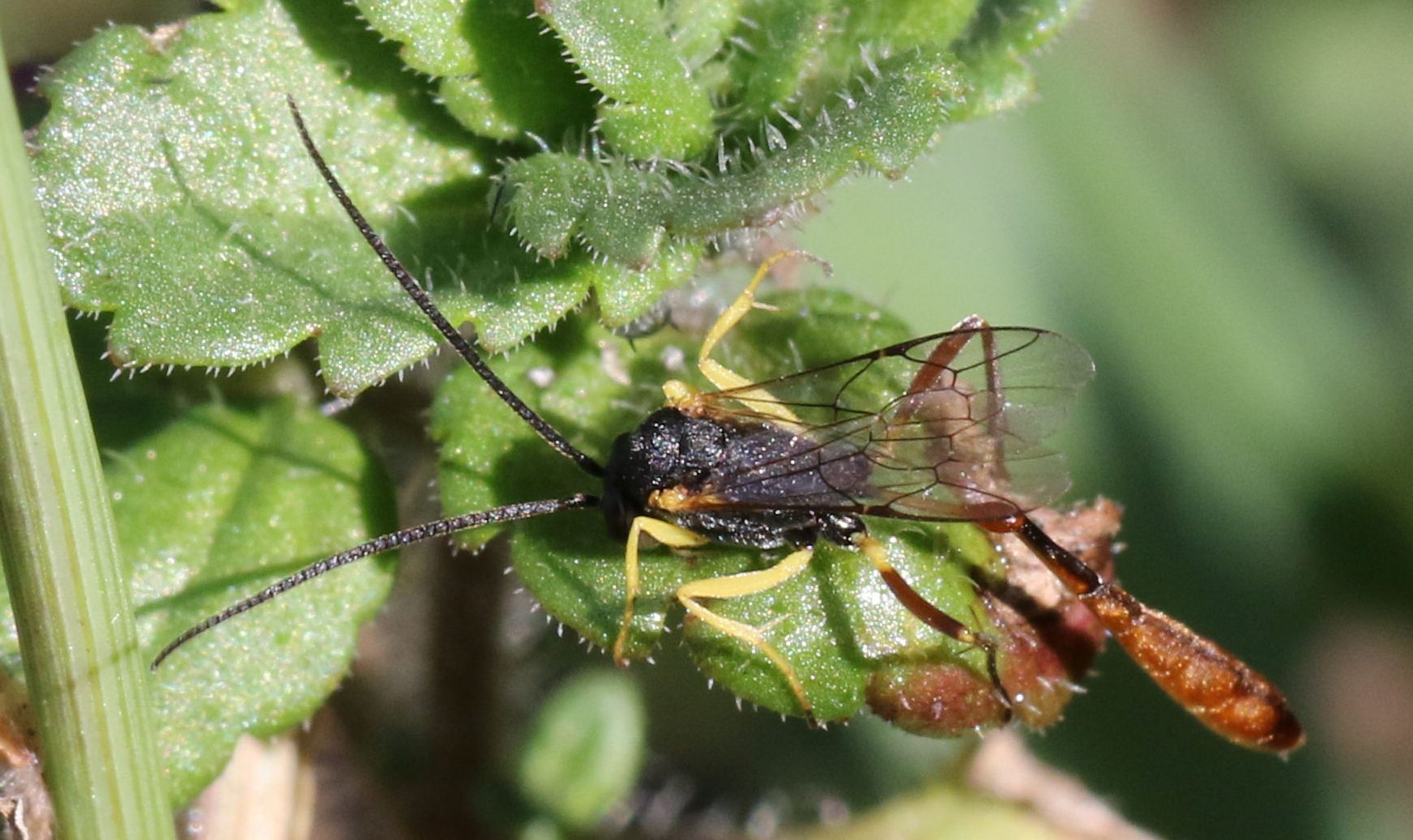
- Charops spinitarsis

Scientific classification
- Kingdom: Animalia
- Phylum: Arthropoda
- Class: Insecta
- Order: Hymenoptera
- Family: Ichneumonidae
- Genus: Charops; Holmgren, 1859

= Charops (wasp) =

Genus of wasps

Charops is a genus of parasitoid wasps belonging to the family Ichneumonidae.

The genus has cosmopolitan distribution.

Species:

- Charops aditya Gupta & Maheshwary, 1971
- Charops aeruginosus Vas, 2020
- Charops angelicae Santos, Onody & Brandão, 2019
- Charops annulipes Ashmead, 1890
- Charops armatus Seyrig, 1935
- Charops ater Szepligeti, 1908
- Charops bicolor (Szepligeti, 1906)
- Charops brachypterus (Cameron, 1897)
- Charops breviceps Kriechbaumer, 1884
- Charops brevipennis (Cameron, 1906)
- Charops cantator (DeGeer, 1778)
- Charops cariniceps Cameron, 1906
- Charops cavendishae Kittel, 2016
- Charops diversipes Roman, 1910
- Charops eduardoi Santos, Onody & Brandão, 2019
- Charops electrinus Vas, 2020
- Charops flavipes (Brulle, 1846)
- Charops fuliginosus Szepligeti, 1908
- Charops ganges Cushman, 1927
- Charops hersei Gupta & Maheshwary, 1971
- Charops juliannae Vas, 2020
- Charops katiae Santos, Onody & Brandão, 2019
- Charops lucianae Santos, Onody & Brandão, 2019
- Charops luctuosus (Cresson, 1865)
- Charops luteipes Walker, 1874
- Charops mariae Santos, Onody & Brandão, 2019
- Charops maroccanus Horstmann, 2008
- Charops mauroknemus Han, Achterberg & Chen, 2022
- Charops mucioi Santos, Onody & Brandão, 2019
- Charops nigritus Gupta & Maheshwary, 1971
- Charops obscurior Roman, 1910
- Charops obtusus Morley, 1913
- Charops plautus Gupta & Maheshwary, 1971
- Charops pulchripes Girault, 1925
- Charops spinitarsis Cameron, 1905
- Charops striatus (Uchida, 1932)
- Charops sumatrensis (Tosquinet, 1903)
- Charops taiwanus Uchida, 1932
- Charops terezae Santos, Onody & Brandão, 2019
