= Dusona aemula =

Scientific classification
- Kingdom: Animalia
- Phylum: Arthropoda
- Clade: Pancrustacea
- Class: Insecta
- Order: Hymenoptera
- Family: Ichneumonidae
- Genus: Dusona
- Species: D. aemula

Binomial name
- Dusona aemula Förster, 1868

Species of wasp

Dusona aemula is a species of parasitic wasp belonging to the family Ichneumonidae, subfamily Campopleginae. It is a parasitoid of Geometrid moth larvae, mainly Eupithecia species.

== Description ==
Head, antennae and thorax black. Second abdominal segment red on the posterion 0.1 – 0.3, third segment almost entirely red and fourth segment often marked with red, gaster otherwise black. Front legs yellow from the trochanter, mid leg yellow from the apex of the trochanter, hind tibia yellowish medially, narrowly marked with black basally, rather broadly marked with black apically. All tarsi are darkened apically. Glymma small. Maxillary palps yellow or yellowish red. Mandibles marked with yellow. Epipleuron of the third tergite not separated by a crease. Size 7-8 mm, 24–30 flagellomeres in females, 28–32 in males. Ovipositor index 0.6. Dusona aemula can be distinguished from the very similar species D. juvenilis by the length of the ovipositor and the presence of a distinct pleural part of the epicnemial carina only sometimes weakly obliterated ventrally.

== Ecology ==
Dusona aemula is a parasitoid of several species of Geometrid moth: Eupithecia absinthiata, Eupithecia centaureata, Eupithecia distinctaria, Eupithecia pimpinellata, Eupithecia ultimaria, Eupithecia venosata and potentially Operophtera brumata though this has not been confirmed. The wasp seems to be either bivoltine or univoltine depending on its host's life cycle and the climate, as it has at least two generations in continental Europe but only one further north. The larva overwinters in its own cocoon. Flight period between June and October.

== Distribution ==
Dusona aemula is known from almost the entire palearctic region: Austria, Azerbaijan, Belgium, Bulgaria, Croatia, Czech Republic, Finland, France, Germany, Hungary, Italy, Kazakhstan, Moldova, Netherlands, Norway, Poland, Romania, Russia, Spain, Sweden, Tunisia, Turkey, Ukraine and United Kingdom.
