= Dusona terebrator =

Scientific classification
- Domain: Eukaryota
- Kingdom: Animalia
- Phylum: Arthropoda
- Class: Insecta
- Order: Hymenoptera
- Family: Ichneumonidae
- Genus: Dusona
- Species: D. terebrator

Binomial name
- Dusona terebrator Förster, 1868

Species of wasp

Dusona terebrator is a species of parasitic wasp belonging to the family Ichneumonidae, subfamily Campopleginae. It is a parasitoid of Noctuid moth larvae.

== Description ==
Head, antennae and thorax black. Central abdominal segments red, basal and posterior segments black, second tergite red on the posterior 0.4–0.5. Hind tibia distinctly marked with black basally and apically. Maxillary palps blackish brown. Mandibles black in females, sometimes marked with yellowish red in males. Petiole smooth or with fine sculpture laterally in front of the glymmae, at most with some transverse wrinkles anteriorly. Mesopleuron with distinctly separated punctures at least dorsally and ventrally, coriaceous and dull between punctures. Third gastral tergite separated from the epipleuron by a crease. Median longitudinal carinae of the propodeum complete or almost complete, joining the costulae anteriorly. Size 9-11mm, 39–44(49) flagellomeres. Ovipositor index 1.0. Dusona terebrator is very similar to other small species of Dusona such as D. leptogaster, D. admontina and in particular D. nidulator but can be distinguished by a combination of the sculpture of the mesopleuron and petiole, the coloration of abdomen, the number of flagellomeres, ovipositor index and other smaller characteristics.

== Ecology ==
The known hosts are the Noctuid moths Athetis hospes, Caradrina morpheus and Charanyca trigrammica. The wasps larvae kill their hosts in the fall and overwinter in their own cocoons. Flight period is April to September (in southern Spain March to September).

== Distribution ==
Dusona terebrator is known from much of the Palearctic region: Austria, Armenia, Azerbaijan, Bulgaria, Belarus, Czech Republic, Finland, France, Germany, Italy, Moldova, Netherlands, Poland, Romania, Russia (including east Siberia), Slovakia, Spain, Sweden, Turkey, Ukraine and United Kingdom.
