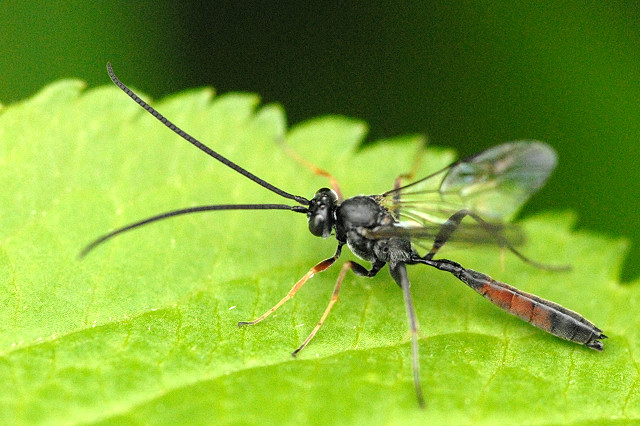
- Dusona leptogaster

Scientific classification
- Domain: Eukaryota
- Kingdom: Animalia
- Phylum: Arthropoda
- Class: Insecta
- Order: Hymenoptera
- Family: Ichneumonidae
- Genus: Dusona
- Species: D. leptogaster

Binomial name
- Dusona leptogaster Holmgren, 1860

= Dusona leptogaster =

Species of wasp

Dusona leptogaster is a species of parasitic wasp belonging to the family Ichneumonidae, subfamily Campopleginae. It is a parasitoid of Geometrid moth larvae, the two known hosts being Alsophila aescularia and Lomaspilis marginata.

== Description ==
Head, antennae and thorax black. Central abdominal segments red, basal and posterior segments black. Coloration of legs varies. Petioloar suture complete. First gastral sternite coriaceous medially. Mesopleuron with wrinkles and without punctuation centrally, densely rugose-punctate dorsally and ventrally (some small specimens might be rugose-punctate centrally). Third gastral tergite separated from the epipleuron by a crease. Median longitudinal carinae of propodeum complete anteriorly. Size 7–8 mm, 38–43 flagellomeres. D. leptogaster is very similar to other small species of Dusona such as Dusona nidulator, Dusona admontina and Dusona terebrator but can be distinguished by a combination of the sculpture of the mesopleuron, the coloration of abdomen, the number of flagellomeres and other smaller characteristics.

== Ecology ==
Dusona leptogaster is a known parasitoid of two species of Geometrid moth: Alsophila aescularia and Lomaspilis marginata. The wasp seems to be either bivoltine or univoltine depending on its host. D. leptogaster larvae kill their host during its pupal stage and then spin a cocoon inside the now hollow pupa. The adult wasp emerges the following year. Flight period is between May and September.

== Distribution ==
Dusona leptogaster is known from most of the palearctic region: Austria, Azerbaijan, Belgium, Bulgaria, Croatia, Czech Republic, Finland, France, Germany, Hungary, Italy, Japan, Latvia, Moldova, Netherlands, Poland, Romania, Russia (including east Siberia), Sweden, Switzerland, Turkey, Ukraine and United Kingdom.
