= Dusona nidulator =

Scientific classification
- Domain: Eukaryota
- Kingdom: Animalia
- Phylum: Arthropoda
- Class: Insecta
- Order: Hymenoptera
- Family: Ichneumonidae
- Genus: Dusona
- Species: D. nidulator

Binomial name
- Dusona nidulator Fabricius, 1804

Species of wasp

Dusona nidulator is a species of parasitic wasp belonging to the family Ichneumonidae, subfamily Campopleginae. It is a parasitoid, but the host is unknown.

== Description ==
Head, antennae and thorax black. Central abdominal segments red, basal and posterior segments black (second tergite red on the posterior 0.1–0.3). Hind tibia yellowish red, often weakly marked with black basally, distinctly marked with black apically. First gastral sternite coriaceous medially. Petiole distinctly sculptured laterally in front of the deep glymmae, with long rows of transverse wrinkles or with irregular wrinkles. Mesopleuron with distinctly separated punctures at least dorsally and ventrally, smooth and shining between punctures. Third gastral tergite separated from the epipleuron by a crease. Spiracular carina indistinct or obliterated. Size 12–13 mm, 48–52 flagellomeres. Ovipositor index 0.5–0.6. D. nidulator is very similar to other small species of Dusona such as Dusona leptogaster, Dusona admontina and Dusona terebrator but can be distinguished by a combination of the sculpture of the mesopleuron and petiole, the coloration of abdomen, the number of flagellomeres, the size and other smaller characteristics.

== Ecology ==
Flight period between April and July.

== Distribution ==
Dusona nidulator is known from most of the palearctic region: Austria, Armenia, Azerbaijan, Belgium, Bulgaria, Belarus, Croatia, Czech Republic, Finland, France, Germany, Georgia, Italy, Latvia, Moldova, Netherlands, Norway, Poland, Romania, Russia (including east Siberia), Slovakia, Sweden, Switzerland, Turkey, Ukraine and United Kingdom.
