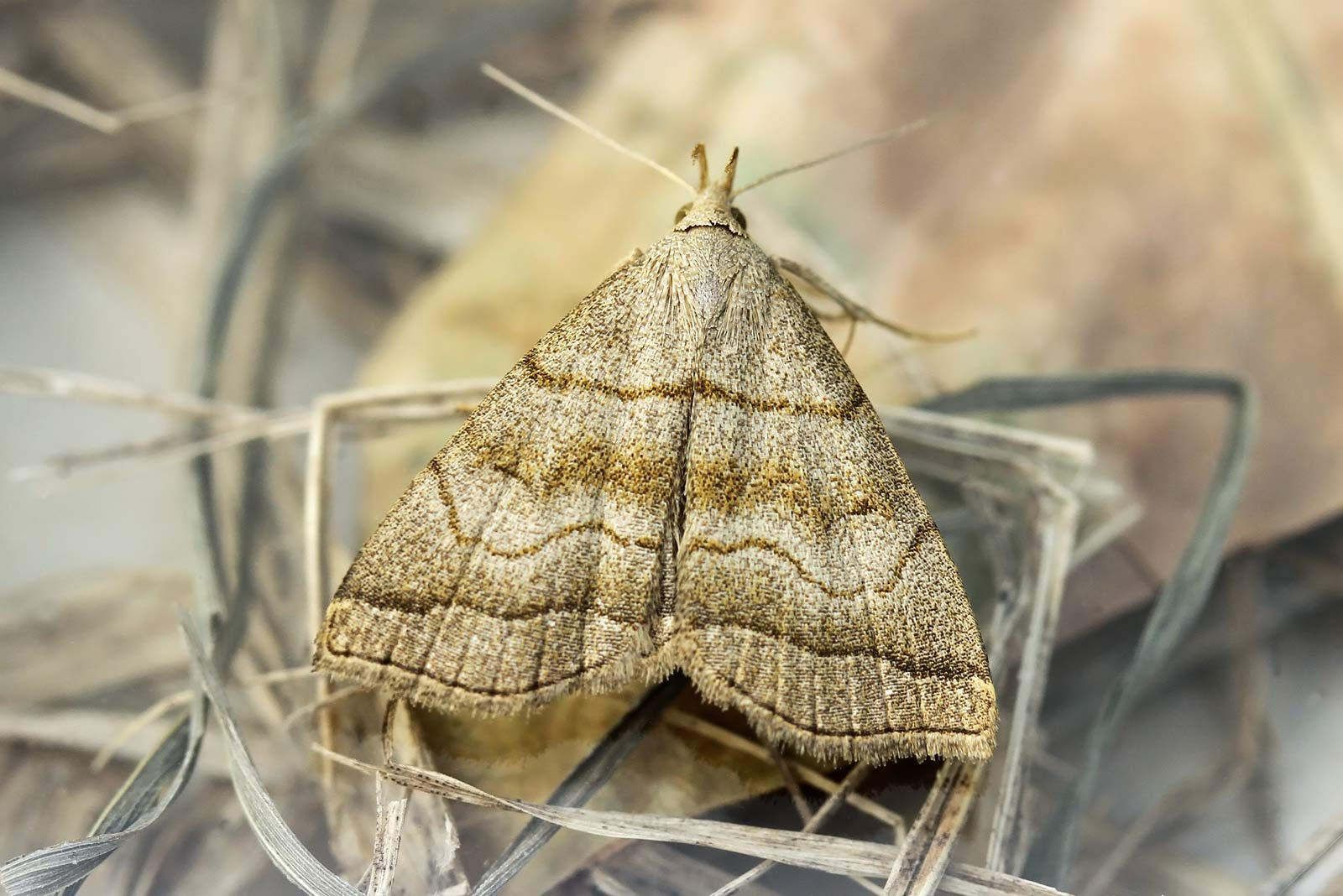
- Herminia tarsicrinalis

Scientific classification
- Kingdom: Animalia
- Phylum: Arthropoda
- Class: Insecta
- Order: Lepidoptera
- Superfamily: Noctuoidea
- Family: Erebidae
- Subfamily: Herminiinae
- Genus: Herminia; Latreille, 1802

Synonyms
- Strigina Savigny, 1816

= Herminia =

Genus of moths

Herminia is a genus of litter moths of the family Erebidae. The genus was described by Pierre André Latreille in 1802. It was treated as a synonym for Polypogon for some time.

== Species ==
- Herminia grisealis Denis & Schiffermüller, 1775 - small fan-foot
- Herminia tarsicrinalis Knoch, 1782 - shaded fan-foot
- Herminia tarsipennalis Treitschke, 1835 - fan-foot
- Herminia tenuialis Rebel, 1899
- Herminia vermiculata (Leech, 1900)
