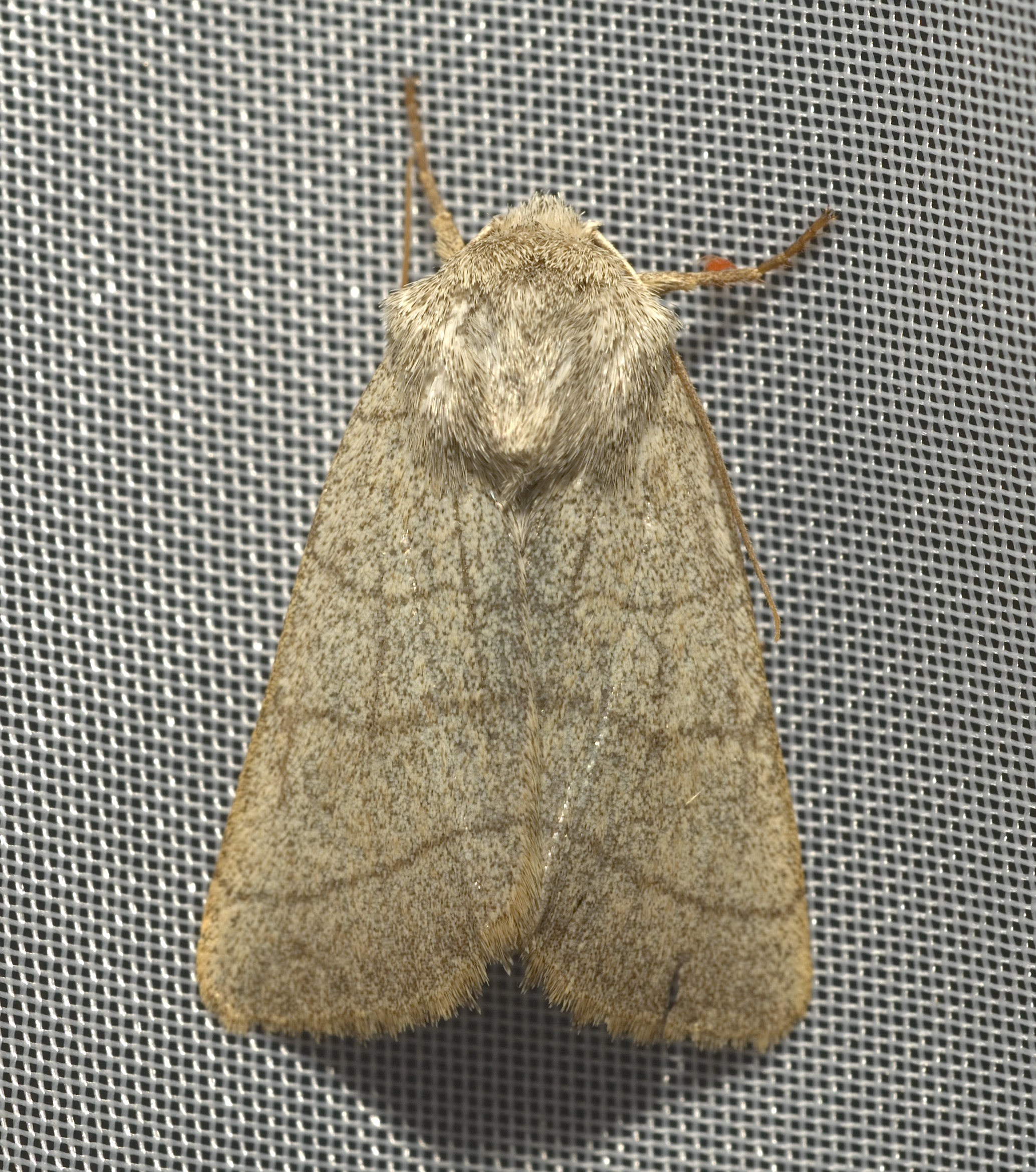
- Charanyca trigrammica

Scientific classification
- Kingdom: Animalia
- Phylum: Arthropoda
- Class: Insecta
- Order: Lepidoptera
- Superfamily: Noctuoidea
- Family: Noctuidae
- Subfamily: Xyleninae
- Genus: Charanyca; Billberg, 1820

= Charanyca =

Genus of moths

Charanyca is a genus of moths of the family Noctuidae.

== Species ==
- Charanyca apfelbecki (Rebel, 1901)
- Charanyca docilis (Walker, 1857)
- Charanyca ferrosqualida Simonyi, 1996
- Charanyca ferruginea (Esper, [1785]) – brown rustic
- Charanyca trigrammica (Hufnagel, 1766) – treble lines
