= Dusona japonica =

Scientific classification
- Domain: Eukaryota
- Kingdom: Animalia
- Phylum: Arthropoda
- Class: Insecta
- Order: Hymenoptera
- Family: Ichneumonidae
- Genus: Dusona
- Species: D. japonica

Binomial name
- Dusona japonica (Cameron, 1906)

Species of wasp

Dusona japonica is a species of parasitic wasp belonging to the family Ichneumonidae, subfamily Campopleginae. It was first described in 1906 as Campoplex japonica by Peter Cameron.

It is found in South Korea, China, Kazakhstan, Kyrgyzstan, Russia, Uzbekistan, India and in Japan.
