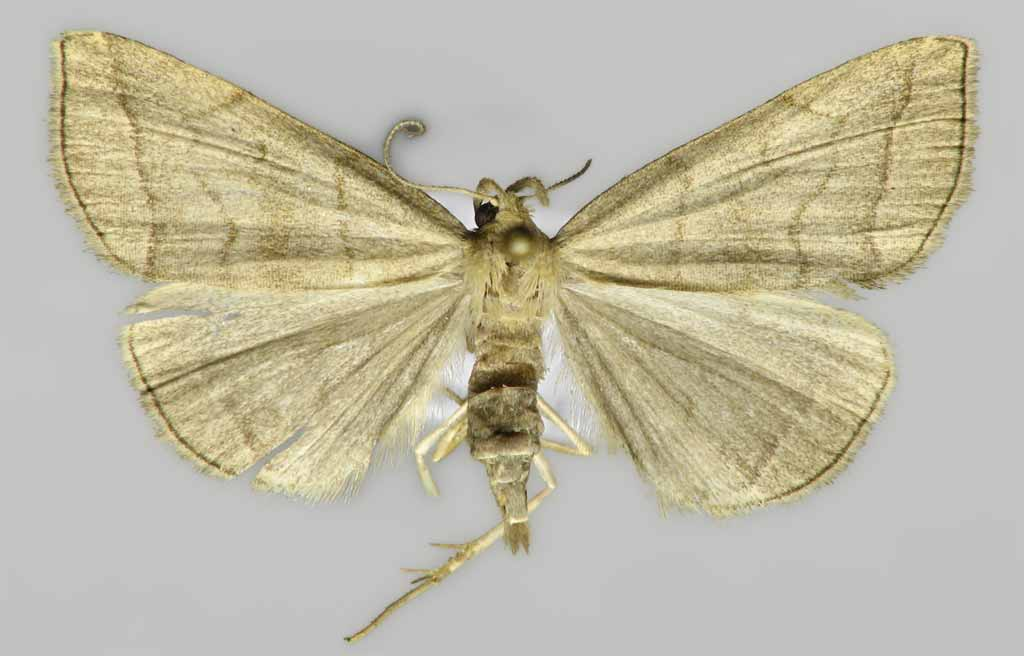

Scientific classification
- Kingdom: Animalia
- Phylum: Arthropoda
- Class: Insecta
- Order: Lepidoptera
- Superfamily: Noctuoidea
- Family: Erebidae
- Genus: Herminia
- Species: H. tarsicrinalis

Binomial name
- Herminia tarsicrinalis (Knoch, 1782)

Synonyms
- Phalaena pyralis tarsicrinalis; Crambus tarsicrinatus

= Herminia tarsicrinalis =

Species of moth

Herminia tarsicrinalis, commonly known as the shaded fan-foot, is a litter moth of the family Erebidae. This species was first described by August Wilhelm Knoch in 1782. It can be found in Europe.

The wingspan is 28–32 millimetres (1.1–1.3 in). The moths flies from June to July depending on the location.

The larvae feed on withered leaves.
