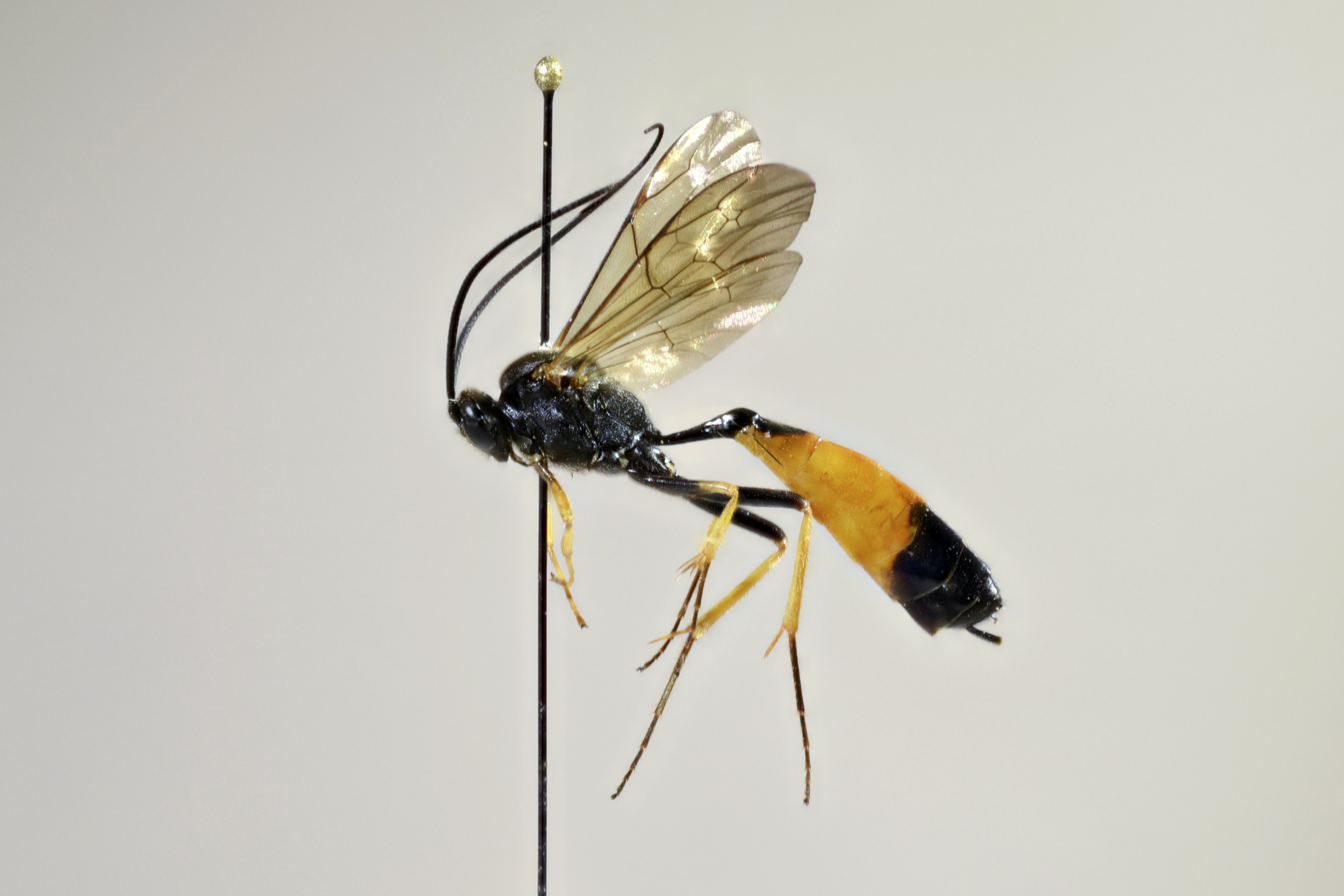

Scientific classification
- Domain: Eukaryota
- Kingdom: Animalia
- Phylum: Arthropoda
- Class: Insecta
- Order: Hymenoptera
- Family: Ichneumonidae
- Genus: Dusona
- Species: D. falcator

Binomial name
- Dusona falcator Fabricius, 1775

Synonyms
- Ichneumon falcator Fabricius, 1775

= Dusona falcator =

Species of wasp

Dusona falcator is a large species of parasitic wasp belonging to the family Ichneumonidae, subfamily Campopleginae. It is a parasitoid of the buff-tip moth. It is one of the largest known species of Camopleginae, able to reach sizes over 20mm. The species can be found throughout the Palearctic realm.

== Description ==
Head, antennae and thorax black. Central segments of abdomen yellow, first and distal segments black. Front and middle legs almost entirety yellow, hind femurs and tarsi mostly black. Hind tibiae yellow at least apically. Depression in front of the speculum on the mesopleuron for the greater part with longitudinal striae. Size 17-20mm, 62-67 flagellomeres. It can be hard to distinguish D. falcator from closely related species such as Dusona obliterata, who has a similar color pattern and size. A clear difference that can be used for identification is that D. obliterata almost entirely lacks the distinct longitudinal striae in front of the speculum (depression might have a few striae dorsally, granulate-strigose ventrally). It is also on average slightly smaller (14–17 mm) and often has fewer flagellar segments (59–66).

== Ecology ==
Females attack larvae of the buff-tip moth during the summer and lays her eggs inside their bodies. The wasp's larva develops by eating the tissue of the host, eventually killing it. The wasp overwinters inside of the moths pupa before emerging.
