= Dusona abdominator =

Scientific classification
- Domain: Eukaryota
- Kingdom: Animalia
- Phylum: Arthropoda
- Class: Insecta
- Order: Hymenoptera
- Family: Ichneumonidae
- Genus: Dusona
- Species: D. abdominator

Binomial name
- Dusona abdominator Hinz, 1985

Species of wasp

Dusona abdominator is a species of parasitic wasp belonging to the family Ichneumonidae, subfamily Campopleginae.

== Description ==
Head, antennae and thorax black. In females are parts of the mandibles, legs excluding the trochanters and coxae, apex of the post petiole and the rest of the abdomen dark red (though base of second abdominal segment usually with a black spot). Third abdominal segment with an indistinct black line. Coloration of males is similar, but with the mandibles, trochanters and coxae mottled with yellow, and with a more distinct black line on the third abdominal segment. Mesopleuron strongly punctate, propleuron partially punctate with shiny areas in between the punctures and with wrinkled sides. Propodeum with distinct transverse carina, oval spiracles removed from the lateral longitudinal carina by about half their lengths and the longitudinal carina dissolving into wrinkles posteriorly in males. First abdominal segment evenly curved on the upper side and without lateral impressions. Epipleuron of the third tergite not separated by a crease. Wing length in females 7.6mm, in males 6.4mm. 47-48 flagellomeres. The species is most easily distinguished by the extensive red coloration of the abdomen, the sculpture of the propodeum and the structure of the first abdominal segment.

== Ecology ==
The known flight period is between February and April.

== Distribution ==
Dusona abdominator is only known from the Canary Islands (Gran Canaria and Tenerife).
