= Dusona juvenilis =

Scientific classification
- Domain: Eukaryota
- Kingdom: Animalia
- Phylum: Arthropoda
- Class: Insecta
- Order: Hymenoptera
- Family: Ichneumonidae
- Genus: Dusona
- Species: D. juvenilis

Binomial name
- Dusona juvenilis Förster, 1868

Species of wasp

Dusona juvenilis is a species of parasitic wasp belonging to the family Ichneumonidae, subfamily Campopleginae. It is a parasitoid of Eupithecia haworthiata larvae.

== Description ==
Head, antennae and thorax black. Second abdominal segment red on the posterior 0.1 – 0.3, third segment extensively red and forth segment black but rarely marked red laterally, gaster otherwise black. Legs varying between yellow and black, front and middle legs usually brighter. Maxillary palps yellow or yellowish red. Mandibles marked with yellow. Epipleuron of the third tergite not separated by a crease. Size 7–9 mm, 26–28 flagellomeres in females, 28–31 in males. Ovipositor index 1.3. Dusona juvenilis can be distinguished from the very similar species D. aemula by the length of the ovipositor and that pleural part of the epicnemial carina being almost completely obliterated, usually with only some wrinkles present medially and/or subdorsally.

== Ecology ==
Dusona juvenilis is univoltine. It is associated with Clematis vitalba since this is the host plant to the host. Flight period is between June and September.

== Distribution ==
Dusona juvenilis is known from a large portion of the Palearctic region: Austria, Belarus, Bulgaria, Finland, France, Germany, Georgia, Greece, Italy, Netherlands, Norway, Poland, Russia (including Siberia), Spain, Sweden, Turkey, Ukraine and United Kingdom.
