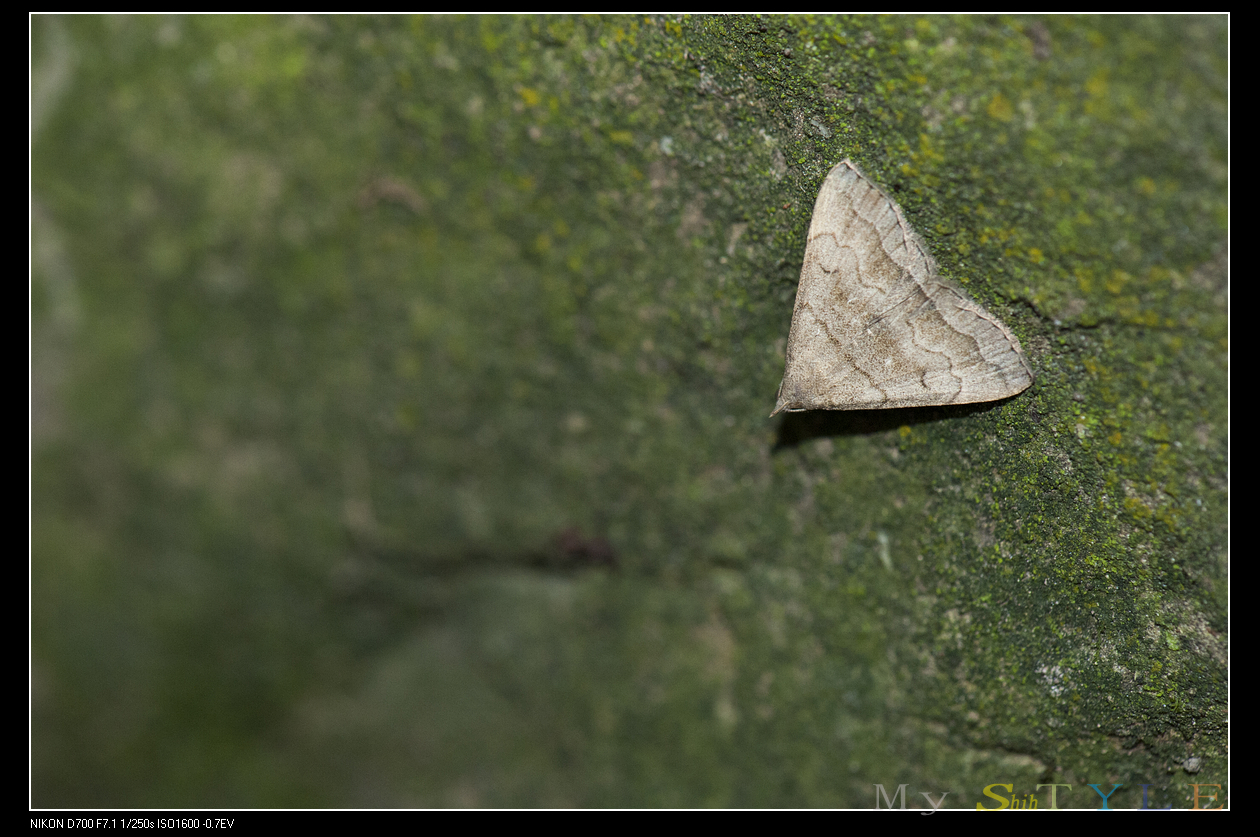

Scientific classification
- Domain: Eukaryota
- Kingdom: Animalia
- Phylum: Arthropoda
- Class: Insecta
- Order: Lepidoptera
- Superfamily: Noctuoidea
- Family: Erebidae
- Genus: Herminia
- Species: H. vermiculata

Binomial name
- Herminia vermiculata (Leech, 1900)

Synonyms
- Nodaria vermiculata Leech, 1900; Polypogon vermiculata

= Herminia vermiculata =

Species of moth

Herminia vermiculata is a litter moth of the family Erebidae first described by John Henry Leech in 1900. It is found in western China and Taiwan.
