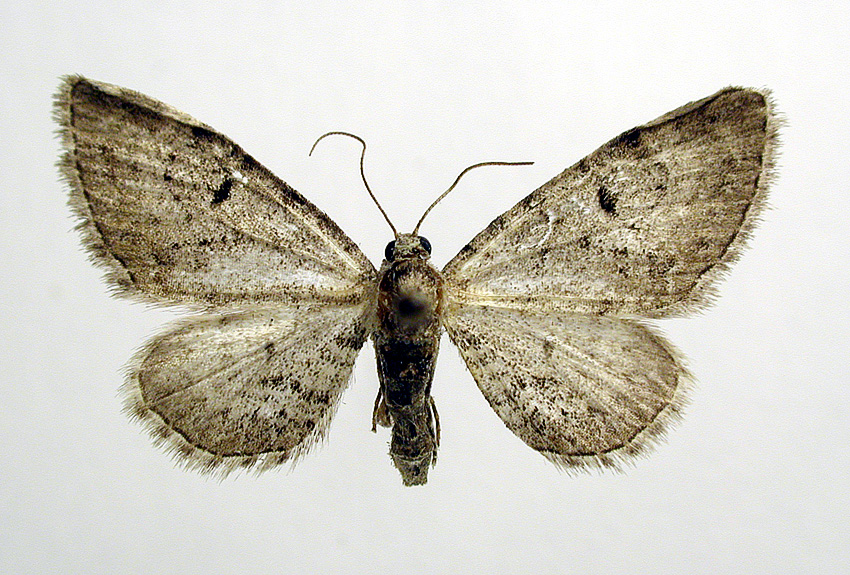

Scientific classification
- Kingdom: Animalia
- Phylum: Arthropoda
- Class: Insecta
- Order: Lepidoptera
- Family: Geometridae
- Genus: Eupithecia
- Species: E. pimpinellata

Binomial name
- Eupithecia pimpinellata (Hübner, 1813)

Synonyms
- Geometra pimpinellata Hübner, 1813; Eupithecia altaicata Guenée, 1858; Eupithecia cinerascens Tengstrom, 1875; Eupithecia lantoscata Milliere, 1873; Eupithecia limbosignata Dietze, 1910; Eupithecia variata Schwingenschuss, 1936; Eupithecia elongata Dietze, 1913

= Eupithecia pimpinellata =

Species of moth

Eupithecia pimpinellata, the pimpinel pug, is a moth of the family Geometridae. The species was first described by Jacob Hübner in 1813. It is known from most of Europe to Morocco (High Atlas), Siberia, Kyrgyzstan, Altai, Mongolia.It primarily colonizes bushy places, forest edges, clearings, hedges, mountain slopes, embankments, railway dams and parks as well as semi-dry grasslands. In the Alps it rises to heights of 1800 metres.

The wingspan is 20–24 mm. Eupithecia pimpinellata has elongated wings. The forewing ground colour is ash-grey suffused rufous. The discal spot is large and elongated. Several crosslines, the median with a row of dark spots. Prout gives an account of the variations. There are forms of the long and slender larva which is either greenish with yellow segment incisions or almost monochrome red. The brownish pupa has green or yellow wing sheaths. On the dark brown cremaster there are eight hook bristles, the middle pair of which is strongly formed.

There is one generation per year with adults on wing from the end of June to August.

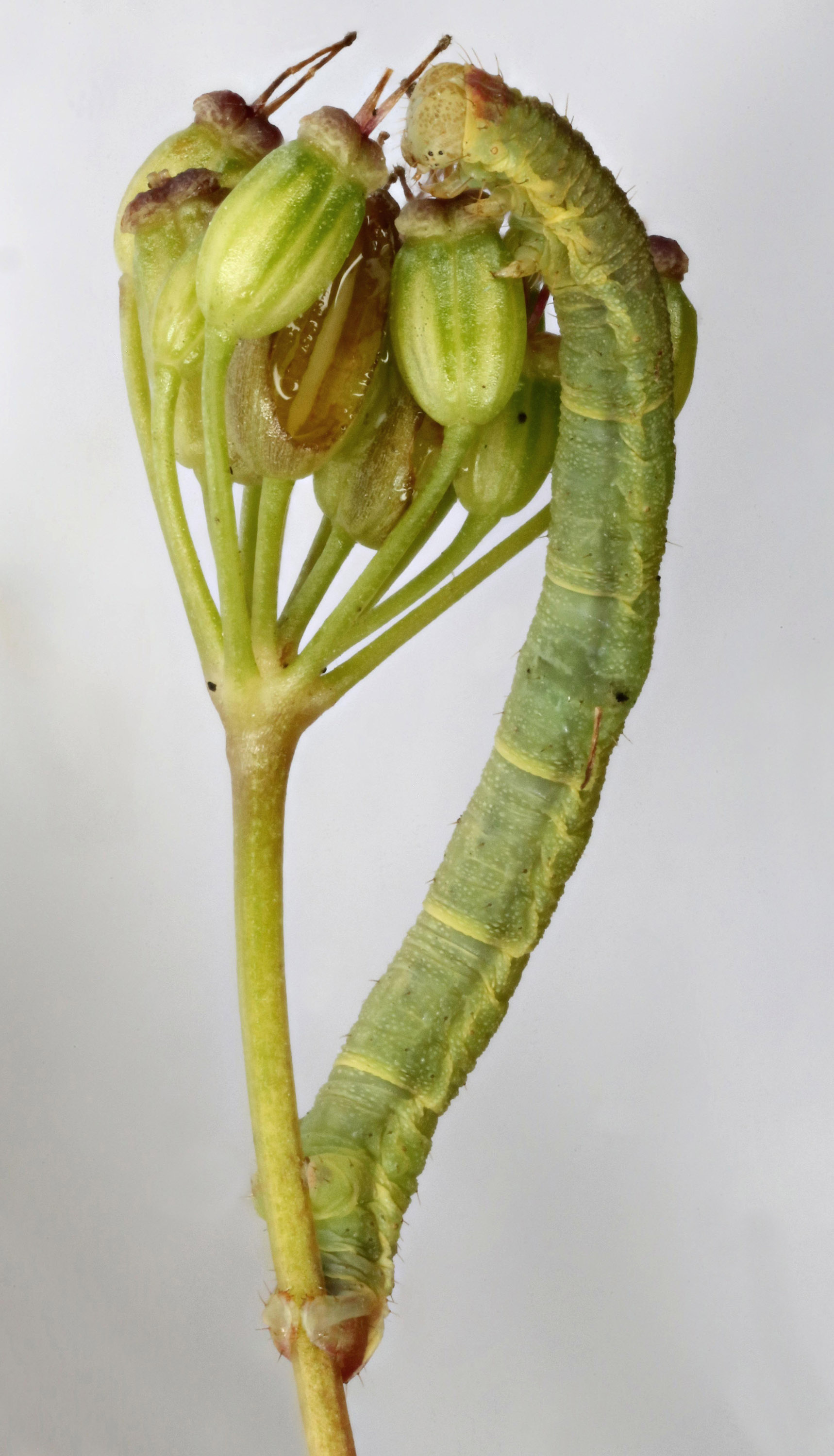
Larva Cors Goch, North Wales, Sept 2016

The larvae mainly feed on Pimpinella saxifraga and Pimpinella major, but also other Apiaceae species. They feed on the flowers and seeds of their host plant. Larvae can be found from July to October. It overwinters as a pupa.

== Subspecies ==
- Eupithecia pimpinellata pimpinellata
- Eupithecia pimpinellata retheli Prout, 1938
- Eupithecia pimpinellata altaicata Guenée, [1858] Altai
- Eupithecia pimpinellata vellicata Dietze, 1908 China

== Similar species ==
- Eupithecia distinctaria lacks the brown saddle on the second abdominal segment.
- Eupithecia pauxillaria is a paler grey E. pimpinellata.
