= Dusona elegans =

Scientific classification
- Domain: Eukaryota
- Kingdom: Animalia
- Phylum: Arthropoda
- Class: Insecta
- Order: Hymenoptera
- Family: Ichneumonidae
- Genus: Dusona
- Species: D. elegans

Binomial name
- Dusona elegans (Szépligeti 1908)

Synonyms
- Campoplex elegans Szépligeti 1908

Species of wasp

Dusona elegans is a species of parasitic wasps in the tribe Limneriini. It is found in Tanzania. The holotype is in the Naturhistoriska Riksmuseet, Stockholm.
