= Strigina =

Scientific classification
- Domain: Eukaryota
- Kingdom: Animalia
- Phylum: Arthropoda
- Class: Insecta
- Order: Lepidoptera
- Superfamily: Noctuoidea
- Family: Erebidae
- Subfamily: Hypeninae
- Genus: Strigina; Savigny, 1816

Genus of moths

Strigina was a genus of moths of the family Noctuidae. The genus was described by Savigny in 1816.

Lepidoptera and Some Other Life Forms has this name as a synonym of Polypogon. The Global Lepidoptera Names Index has this as a synonym of Herminia.
