= Eupithecia pauxillaria =

Scientific classification
- Domain: Eukaryota
- Kingdom: Animalia
- Phylum: Arthropoda
- Class: Insecta
- Order: Lepidoptera
- Family: Geometridae
- Genus: Eupithecia
- Species: E. pauxillaria

Binomial name
- Eupithecia pauxillaria Boisduval, 1840

Synonyms
- Eupithecia euphrasiata Herrich-Schaffer 1861; Eupithecia vellicata Dietze 1906

Species of moth

Eupithecia pauxillaria, the parsimonious pug, is a moth in the family Geometridae. It is found in most of Europe, except Ireland, Great Britain, Portugal and northern Europe and the central part of the Balkan Peninsula.

The wingspan is 19–22 mm. Adults are on wing from June to October.

The larvae feed on Odontites (including Odontites lutea) and Euphrasia species. Larvae can be found in September and October.
