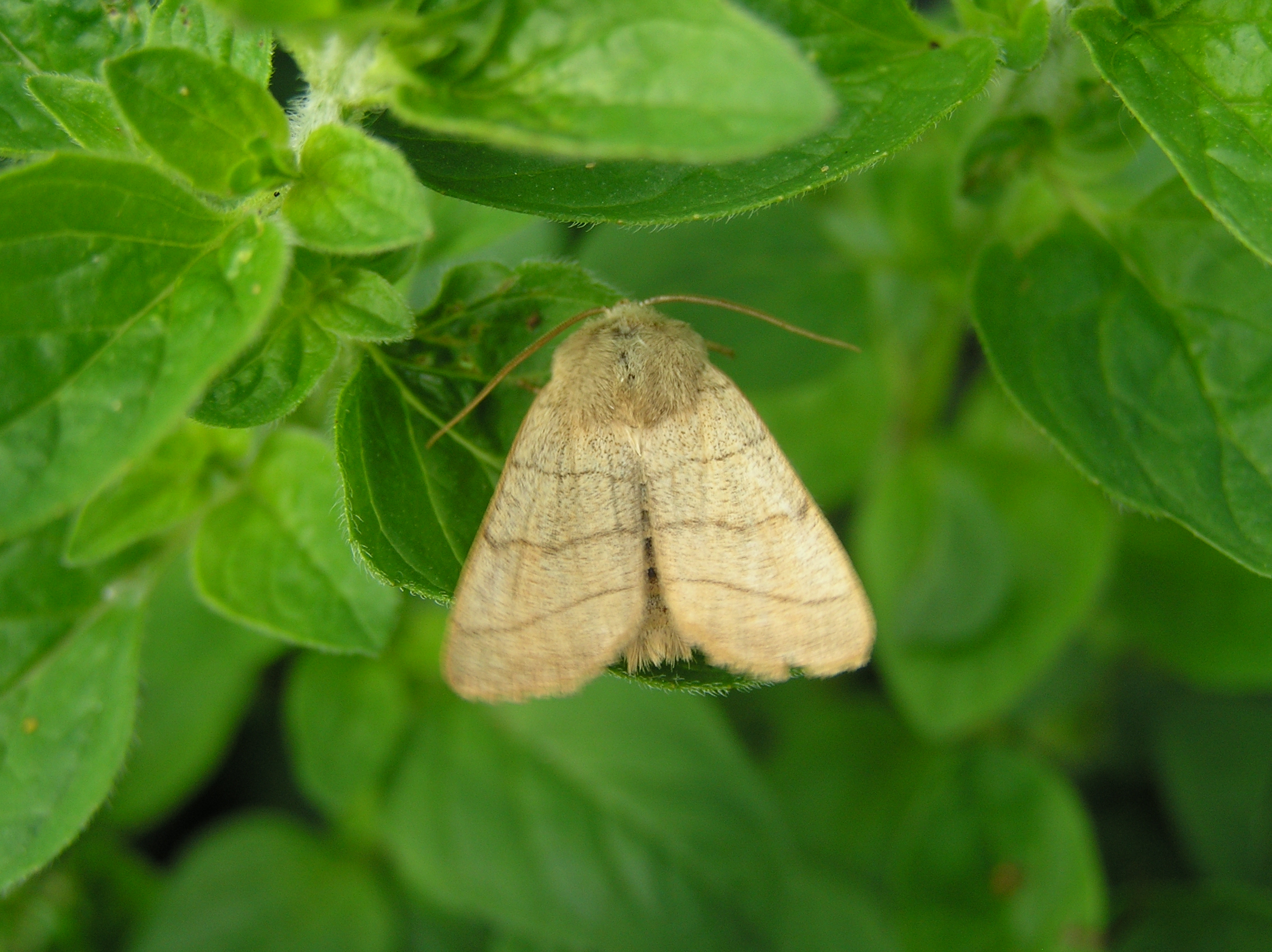

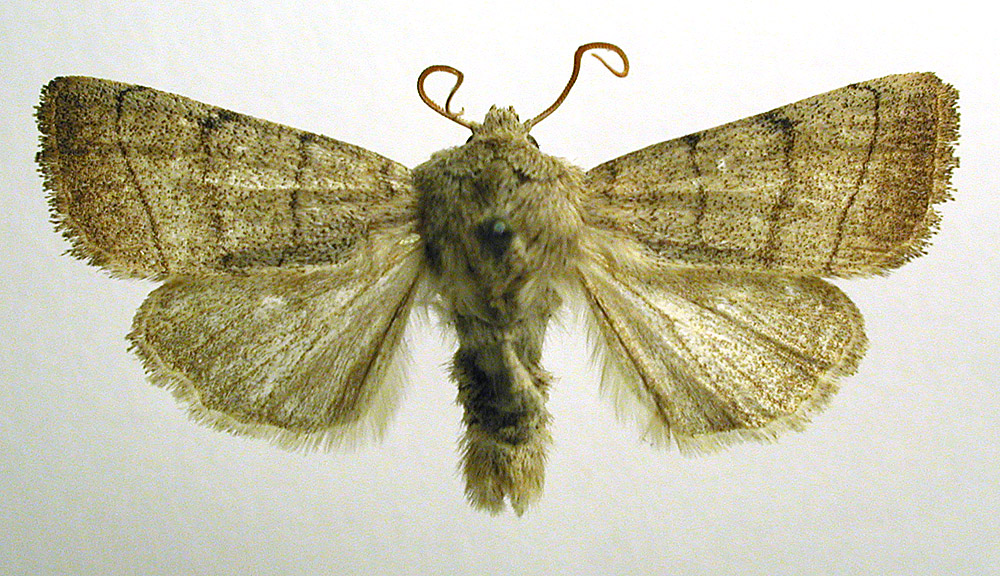

Scientific classification
- Domain: Eukaryota
- Kingdom: Animalia
- Phylum: Arthropoda
- Class: Insecta
- Order: Lepidoptera
- Superfamily: Noctuoidea
- Family: Noctuidae
- Genus: Charanyca
- Species: C. trigrammica

Binomial name
- Charanyca trigrammica (Hufnagel, 1766)

= Charanyca trigrammica =

Species of moth

The Treble Lines (Charanyca trigrammica) is a moth of the family Noctuidae. It is found virtually throughout Europe.In addition, there are occurrences in Asia minor and the Caucasus.In the mountains it rises to altitudes of 1000 metres.

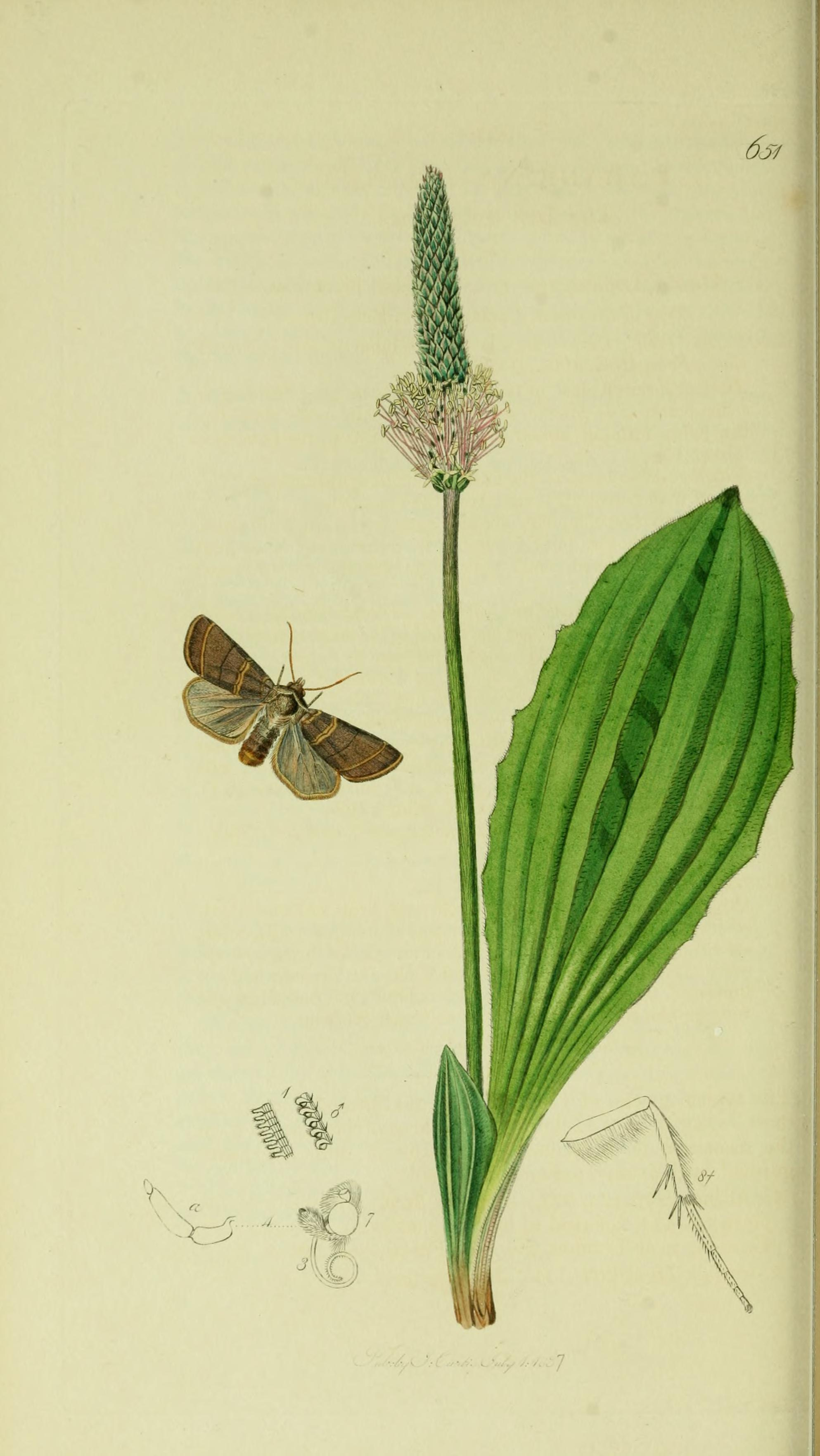
Illustration from John Curtis's British Entomology Volume 5

== Description ==
The wingspan is 35–40 millimetres (1.4–1.6 in) Forewing whitish ochreous finely dusted with olive brown, sometimes with a slight ochraceous or pinkish tinge, and with a darker shade just before termen: crossed by 3 brown lines, of which the inner is somewhat oblique outwards, and the outer inwards: the median generally a little thicker, sometimes followed by a distinct dark shade; hindwing pale to dark grey, varying according to the forewing; in the form evidens Thnbg, the forewing is rufous ochreous or yellow ochreous, the hindwing darker; - bilinea Hbn. a rare form, has the space between inner and median lines dark, the rest of the wing being reddish grey; — in perrufa ab. nov. [Warren] the whole wing is rufous, with the median shade absent or obscure; — obscura Tutt is dull olive fuscous with the median shade hardly visible, the hindwing also dark fuscous; while pallidalinea Tutt has the inner line obsolete, the other two pale;- semifuscans Haw. has the ground colour of the type, whitish ochreous, as far as the median line, the outer half being dark, the median line followed externally by a dark shade and the termen preceded by a similar shade: the ab. fringsii Schultz has only one transverse line; -lastly, erubescens Trti, from Sicily, is a dark brown form with the median line present.

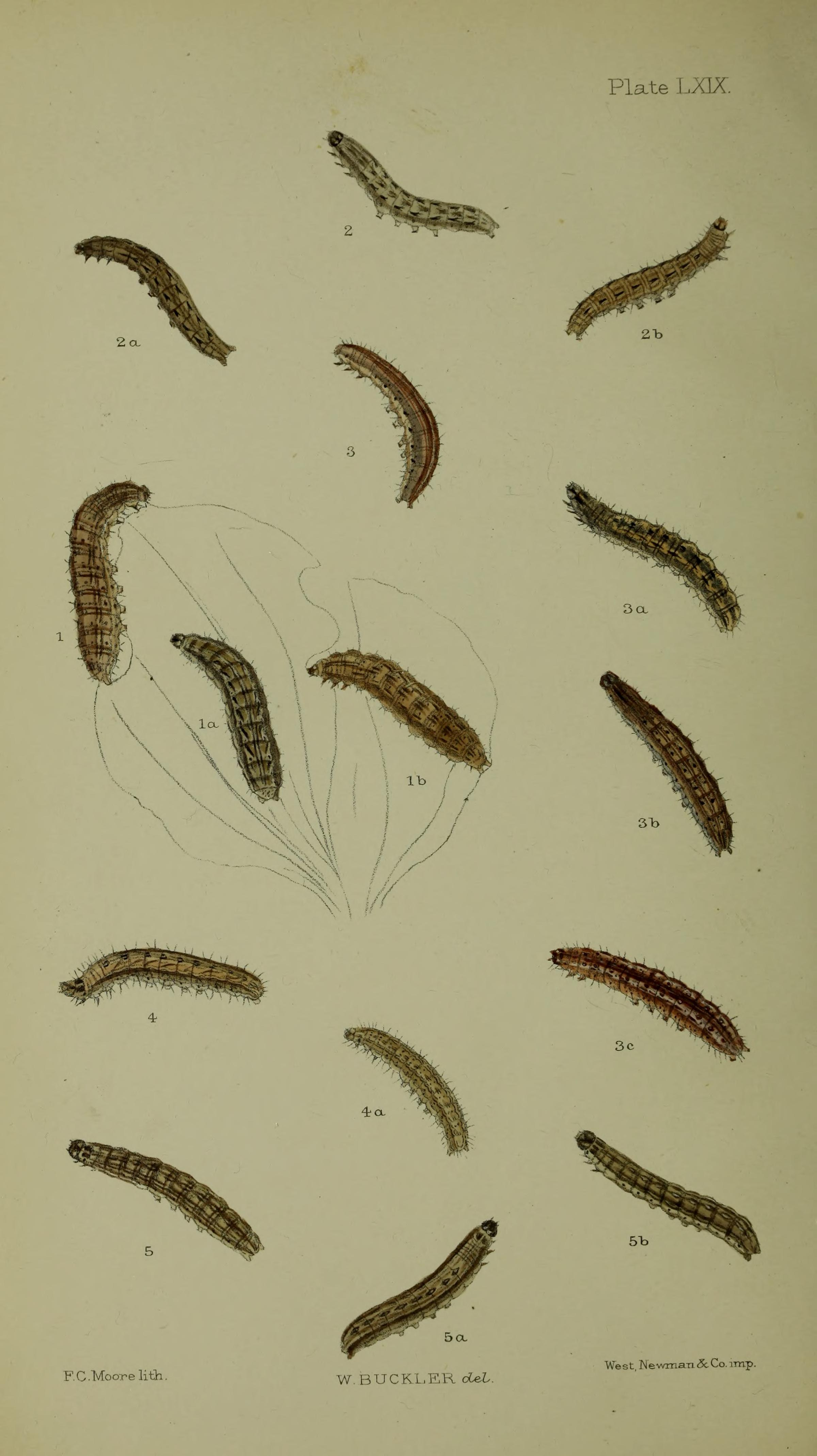
Figs 1, 1a, 1b larva after last moult

== Biology ==
The moth flies in one generation from April to July and are attracted to light and sugar.

The spherical egg is heavily flattened at the base and has strong ribs, of which only about half reach the pole. It is of yellowish white colour. The caterpillar is stocky, grey to reddish coloured, provided with many point warts as well as some short hair and shows a bright, interrupted back line. The stigma are bordered black and white. The front part tapers towards the small head. The caterpillars preferably feed on various herbaceous plants including Plantago major.

== Notes ==
1. The flight season refers to Belgium and The Netherlands. This may vary in other parts of the range.
