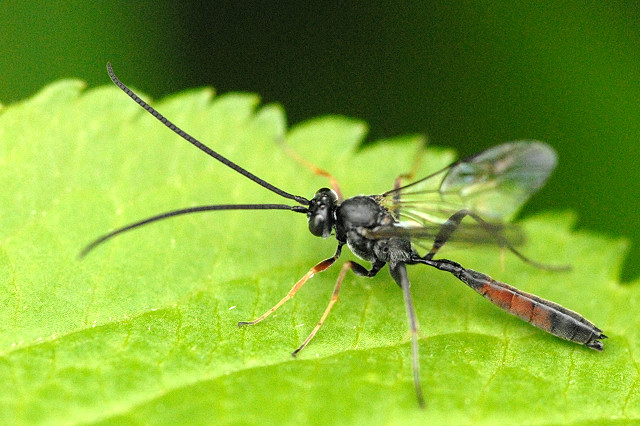
- Dusona leptogaster

Scientific classification
- Domain: Eukaryota
- Kingdom: Animalia
- Phylum: Arthropoda
- Class: Insecta
- Order: Hymenoptera
- Family: Ichneumonidae
- Subfamily: Campopleginae
- Tribe: Limneriini
- Genus: Dusona; Cameron, 1901

= Dusona =

Genus of insects

Dusona is a genus of parasitoid wasps belonging to the family Ichneumonidae. It is the most species rich genus of the subfamily Campopleginae with 442 known species.

The genus has cosmopolitan distribution.

== Description ==
Dusona is an easily recognized genus among other Campopleginae due to a number of clear diagnostic characteristics which include: elongated, oval or slit-shaped propodeal spiracles; a very strongly compressed metasoma; closed areolets and petiolar sutures that are often obliterated or positioned very low anteriorly. Additionally many species reach unusually large body sizes, some exceeding 20 mm (see Dusona falcator). The thorax and head of most species are uniformly black, with the abdomen varying between black, red, brown, orange and yellow, with the fist tergit and the outer most tergites most usually black.

== Ecology ==
All species of Dusona are parasitoids, with the main hosts being the larvae of Lepidopterans. The host is usually killed as a prepupa, in a few cases as a pupa. Only one species, Dusona minor, has been reported as a parasitoid of larva outside of Lepidoptera, parasitoidizing the sawfly Monoctenus juniperi.

== Species ==
- Dusona abdominator Hinz, 1985
- Dusona admontina (Speiser, 1908)
- Dusona adriaansei (Teunissen, 1947)
- Dusona aemula (Forster, 1868)
- Dusona aequorea Gupta & Gupta, 1977
- Dusona affinis (Brischke, 1880)
- Dusona affinitor Hinz, 1979
- Dusona ahlaensis Gupta & Gupta, 1977
- Dusona alius (Norton, 1863)
- Dusona alpigena Hinz, 1972
- Dusona alpina (Strobl, 1904)
- Dusona alpinator Hinz & Horstmann, 2004
- Dusona alticola (Gravenhorst, 1829)
- Dusona alveolata Gupta & Gupta, 1977
- Dusona americana (Ashmead, 1890)
- Dusona amurator Hinz, 1985
- Dusona anceps (Holmgren, 1860)
- Dusona angustata (Thomson, 1887)
- Dusona angustifrons (Forster, 1868)
- Dusona annexa (Forster, 1868)
- Dusona anomala (Seyrig, 1935)
- Dusona aquilonaria Gupta & Gupta, 1977
- Dusona argentea (Norton, 1863)
- Dusona argentopilosa (Enderlein, 1921)
- Dusona artonae (Narendran, 2000)
- Dusona aspera (Gupta & Gupta, 1976)
- Dusona assita (Norton, 1863)
- Dusona associata (Walley, 1940)
- Dusona atriceps (Cresson, 1865)
- Dusona atricolor (Szepligeti, 1908)
- Dusona atrotibialis Horstmann, 2006
- Dusona augasma (Gupta & Gupta, 1976)
- Dusona auriculator Aubert, 1964
- Dusona aurifer (Cresson, 1874)
- Dusona aurita (Kriechbaumer, 1883)
- Dusona australis (Walley, 1940)
- Dusona aversa (Forster, 1868)
- Dusona baueri Hinz, 1973
- Dusona bellator Hinz & Horstmann, 2004
- Dusona bellipes (Holmgren, 1872)
- Dusona bellula (Dalla Torre, 1901)
- Dusona belokobyli Hinz & Horstmann, 2004
- Dusona bharata Gupta & Gupta, 1977
- Dusona bicolor (Brischke, 1880)
- Dusona bicoloripes (Ashmead, 1906)
- Dusona brachiator (Say, 1835)
- Dusona brevicornis (Brischke, 1880)
- Dusona brevisocrea Gupta & Gupta, 1977
- Dusona brischkei (Dalla Torre, 1901)
- Dusona brullei (Dalla Torre, 1901)
- Dusona bucculenta (Holmgren, 1860)
- Dusona bucculentoides Hinz & Horstmann, 2004
- Dusona buddha (Cameron, 1897)
- Dusona burmensis Gupta & Gupta, 1977
- Dusona calceata (Brauns, 1895)
- Dusona cameronii (Dalla Torre, 1901)
- Dusona canadensis (Walley, 1940)
- Dusona capitator Hinz, 1985
- Dusona carinata Gupta & Gupta, 1977
- Dusona carinator Hinz, 1979
- Dusona carinifer (Teunissen, 1947)
- Dusona carinifrons (Holmgren, 1860)
- Dusona cariniscutis (Cameron, 1903)
- Dusona carlsoni Gupta & Gupta, 1977
- Dusona carpathica (Szepligeti, 1916)
- Dusona carpinellae (Schrank, 1802)
- Dusona castanipes (Thomson, 1887)
- Dusona caudator Hinz, 1985
- Dusona celator Hinz, 1985
- Dusona ceylonica (Cameron, 1897)
- Dusona chabarowski Hinz & Horstmann, 2004
- Dusona chechziri Hinz & Horstmann, 2004
- Dusona chikaldaensis Gupta & Gupta, 1977
- Dusona chinensis Horstmann, 2004
- Dusona circumcinctus (Forster, 1868)
- Dusona circumspectans (Forster, 1868)
- Dusona citeria Gupta & Gupta, 1977
- Dusona collaris Hinz & Horstmann, 2004
- Dusona confluens (Walley, 1940)
- Dusona conformis (Walley, 1940)
- Dusona confusa (Forster, 1868)
- Dusona confusator Hinz & Horstmann, 2004
- Dusona consobrina (Holmgren, 1872)
- Dusona constantineanui Hinz, 1977
- Dusona contumator Hinz, 1979
- Dusona contumax (Forster, 1868)
- Dusona coriacea Horstmann, 2004
- Dusona cornellus (Teunissen, 1947)
- Dusona crassicornis (Provancher, 1886)
- Dusona crassipes (Thomson, 1887)
- Dusona crassiventris Horstmann, 2004
- Dusona cressonii (Dalla Torre, 1901)
- Dusona cultrator (Gravenhorst, 1829)
- Dusona cytaeis (Cameron, 1903)
- Dusona debilis (Forster, 1868)
- Dusona deceptor (Walley, 1940)
- Dusona definis Gupta & Gupta, 1977
- Dusona deodarae (Cushman, 1927)
- Dusona destructor Wahl, 1991
- Dusona detritor Hinz & Horstmann, 2004
- Dusona dictor Hinz, 1979
- Dusona dimidiata (Brulle, 1846)
- Dusona dimidiata (Gupta & Gupta, 1976)
- Dusona dineshi Gupta & Gupta, 1977
- Dusona disclusa (Forster, 1868)
- Dusona diversa (Norton, 1863)
- Dusona diversella (Walley, 1940)
- Dusona diversicolor (Viereck, 1925)
- Dusona doonensis Gupta & Gupta, 1977
- Dusona dositheae (Audouin, 1834)
- Dusona downesi (Viereck, 1925)
- Dusona dubitor Hinz, 1977
- Dusona egregia (Viereck, 1916)
- Dusona einbecki Hinz, 1977
- Dusona ektypha Gupta & Gupta, 1977
- Dusona elegans (Szepligeti, 1908)
- Dusona ellopiae (Walley, 1929)
- Dusona elongata (Gupta & Gupta, 1976)
- Dusona epomiata Gupta & Gupta, 1977
- Dusona erythra (Uchida, 1932)
- Dusona erythrogaster (Forster, 1868)
- Dusona erythrospila (Cameron, 1906)
- Dusona experta (Cresson, 1872)
- Dusona exsculpta (Brischke, 1880)
- Dusona extranea (Turner, 1919)
- Dusona falcator (Fabricius, 1775)
- Dusona fatigator (Forster, 1868)
- Dusona femoralis Gupta & Gupta, 1977
- Dusona ferruginea Walkley, 1963
- Dusona fervida (Tosquinet, 1903)
- Dusona filator Hinz, 1985
- Dusona filicornis (Holmgren, 1872)
- Dusona flagellator (Fabricius, 1793)
- Dusona flavescens (Walley, 1940)
- Dusona flavipennis (Cresson, 1874)
- Dusona flavitarsis Horstmann, 2004
- Dusona flavopicta Horstmann, 2004
- Dusona flinti Gupta & Gupta, 1977
- Dusona fossata (Viereck, 1926)
- Dusona fractocristata (Enderlein, 1921)
- Dusona fuliginosa (Szepligeti, 1908)
- Dusona fulvicornis (Cameron, 1906)
- Dusona fundator (Hinz, 1990)
- Dusona fuscitarsis (Viereck, 1926)
- Dusona ganeshi Gupta & Gupta, 1977
- Dusona garhwalensis (Gupta & Gupta, 1976)
- Dusona gastator Hinz, 1985
- Dusona gastroides Horstmann, 2004
- Dusona geminata Gupta & Gupta, 1977
- Dusona genalis (Thomson, 1887)
- Dusona genator Hinz, 1979
- Dusona gephyra Gupta & Gupta, 1977
- Dusona gibbosa (Gupta & Gupta, 1976)
- Dusona glabra Gupta & Gupta, 1977
- Dusona glauca (Norton, 1863)
- Dusona gnara (Cresson, 1874)
- Dusona gracilis (Walley, 1940)
- Dusona grahami (Walley, 1940)
- Dusona graptor Hinz, 1985
- Dusona guatemalensis (Cameron, 1886)
- Dusona habermehli (Kriechbaumer, 1898)
- Dusona heptahamuli (Gupta & Gupta, 1976)
- Dusona himachalensis Gupta & Gupta, 1977
- Dusona himalayensis (Cameron, 1899)
- Dusona holmgrenii (Dalla Torre, 1901)
- Dusona horrida (Hancock, 1926)
- Dusona humilis (Forster, 1868)
- Dusona impressifrons Hinz, 1979
- Dusona inclivata Gupta & Gupta, 1977
- Dusona incompleta (Bridgman, 1889)
- Dusona inconspicua Horstmann, 2004
- Dusona indistinctor Hinz, 1979
- Dusona inermis (Forster, 1868)
- Dusona infelix (Dalla Torre, 1901)
- Dusona infesta (Forster, 1868)
- Dusona infundibulum Horstmann, 2004
- Dusona insignita (Forster, 1868)
- Dusona insolita (Walley, 1940)
- Dusona intelligator Aubert, 1966
- Dusona interstitialis (Walley, 1940)
- Dusona iwatae Hinz, 1994
- Dusona japonica (Cameron, 1906)
- Dusona johnsoni (Walley, 1940)
- Dusona juvenilis (Forster, 1868)
- Dusona juventas (Morley, 1916)
- Dusona juxta (Gupta & Gupta, 1976)
- Dusona kalatopensis Gupta & Gupta, 1977
- Dusona kamathi Gupta & Gupta, 1977
- Dusona kamrupa (Gupta & Gupta, 1976)
- Dusona karkil (Cheesman, 1936)
- Dusona kasparyani Hinz, 1985
- Dusona kerrichi (Gupta & Gupta, 1976)
- Dusona korta (Cheesman, 1953)
- Dusona kriechbaumeri (Costa, 1884)
- Dusona lacivia (Cresson, 1874)
- Dusona lajae Gupta & Gupta, 1977
- Dusona lamellator Aubert, 1960
- Dusona lamellifer Hinz, 1994
- Dusona laminata (Walley, 1940)
- Dusona laticincta (Cresson, 1865)
- Dusona lautareti (Hinz, 1990)
- Dusona lecta (Cresson, 1874)
- Dusona lenticulata Gupta & Gupta, 1977
- Dusona leptogaster (Holmgren, 1860)
- Dusona levibasis Horstmann, 2004
- Dusona libauensis (Strand, 1918)
- Dusona liberator Hinz, 1985
- Dusona libertatis (Teunissen, 1947)
- Dusona linearis Horstmann, 2004
- Dusona lineola (Schrottky, 1902)
- Dusona lividariae Hinz, 1963
- Dusona lobata (Walley, 1940)
- Dusona longiabdominalis (Uchida, 1932)
- Dusona longicauda (Uchida, 1928)
- Dusona longifemorata (Gupta & Gupta, 1976)
- Dusona longigena Horstmann, 2004
- Dusona longigenata Gupta & Gupta, 1977
- Dusona longiseta Hinz, 1961
- Dusona longistilus Horstmann, 2004
- Dusona longiterebra (Gupta & Gupta, 1976)
- Dusona luctuosa (Provancher, 1875)
- Dusona luteipes (Thomson, 1887)
- Dusona macrofovea Iwata, 1960
- Dusona mactatoides Hinz, 1994
- Dusona mactator (Forster, 1868)
- Dusona magnifica (Walley, 1940)
- Dusona major (Cresson, 1879)
- Dusona malaisei Gupta & Gupta, 1977
- Dusona marmorata (Szepligeti, 1908)
- Dusona maruyamae Hinz, 1994
- Dusona maruyamator Hinz, 1979
- Dusona matsumurae (Uchida, 1928)
- Dusona mediator (Gupta & Gupta, 1976)
- Dusona melanator Hinz, 1985
- Dusona memorator Hinz, 1994
- Dusona mercator (Fabricius, 1793)
- Dusona meridionator Aubert, 1960
- Dusona meritor Hinz & Horstmann, 2004
- Dusona mexicana (Cameron, 1886)
- Dusona micrator Hinz, 1979
- Dusona mikroschemos (Gupta & Gupta, 1976)
- Dusona minor (Provancher, 1879)
- Dusona minuta (Holmgren, 1856)
- Dusona minutor Horstmann, 2004
- Dusona miranda (Szepligeti, 1908)
- Dusona mixta (Pollich, 1781)
- Dusona momoii Hinz & Horstmann, 2004
- Dusona montana (Roman, 1929)
- Dusona montrealensis (Viereck, 1926)
- Dusona murarii (Gupta, 1987)
- Dusona myrtilla (Desvignes, 1856)
- Dusona nagatomii (Kusigemati, 1990)
- Dusona nanus Horstmann, 2004
- Dusona nebulosa Horstmann, 2004
- Dusona negata (Turner, 1919)
- Dusona nervellator Horstmann, 2004
- Dusona nidulator (Fabricius, 1804)
- Dusona nigriapiculata (Gupta & Gupta, 1976)
- Dusona nigridens Horstmann, 2004
- Dusona nigridorsum Horstmann, 2004
- Dusona nigrina Horstmann, 2004
- Dusona nigritegula Gupta & Gupta, 1977
- Dusona nigritibialis (Viereck, 1926)
- Dusona nigritibialis (Gupta & Gupta, 1976)
- Dusona nitidipleuris Horstmann, 2004
- Dusona norikurae Hinz & Horstmann, 2004
- Dusona notabilis (Forster, 1868)
- Dusona novitia (Morley, 1913)
- Dusona nubilator Hinz, 1994
- Dusona nursei (Cameron, 1907)
- Dusona obesa (Davis, 1898)
- Dusona obliterata (Holmgren, 1872)
- Dusona obscurator Horstmann, 2004
- Dusona obscuripes Horstmann, 2004
- Dusona obtutor Hinz, 1994
- Dusona occidentalis (Davis, 1898)
- Dusona occipita Gupta & Gupta, 1977
- Dusona ocellata (Walley, 1940)
- Dusona okadai (Uchida, 1942)
- Dusona opaca (Thomson, 1887)
- Dusona opacoides Hinz, 1985
- Dusona opima (Cresson, 1874)
- Dusona orientalis Gupta & Gupta, 1977
- Dusona pahalgamensis Gupta & Gupta, 1977
- Dusona pallescens (Walley, 1940)
- Dusona papator Hinz & Horstmann, 2004
- Dusona parallela Gupta & Gupta, 1977
- Dusona parva Horstmann, 2004
- Dusona parvicavata Horstmann, 2004
