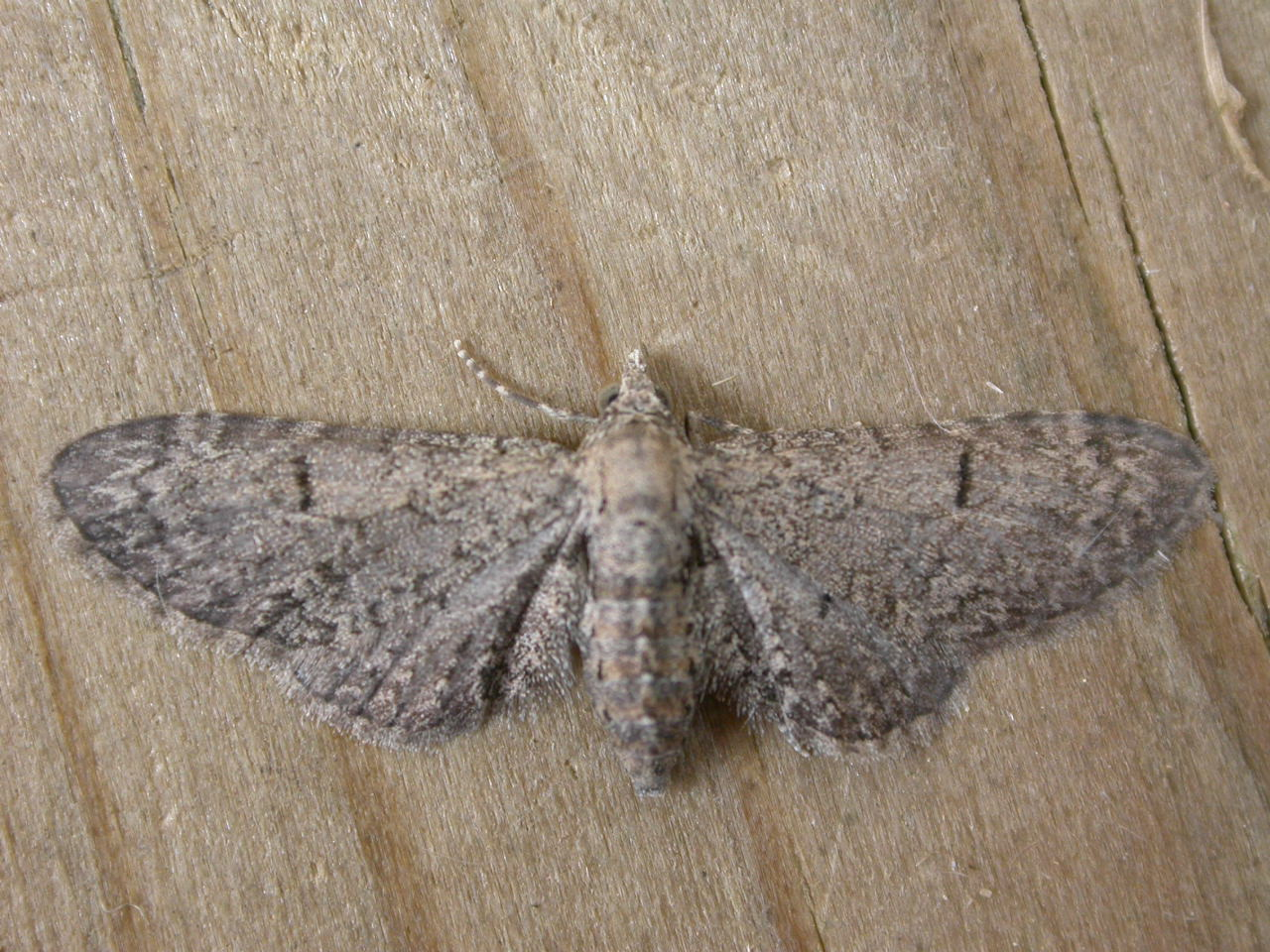

Scientific classification
- Domain: Eukaryota
- Kingdom: Animalia
- Phylum: Arthropoda
- Class: Insecta
- Order: Lepidoptera
- Family: Geometridae
- Genus: Eupithecia
- Species: E. ultimaria

Binomial name
- Eupithecia ultimaria Boisduval, 1840

Synonyms
- Tephroclystia tornifascia Rothschild, 1913; Eupithecia golearia Lucas, 1940

= Eupithecia ultimaria =

Species of moth

Eupithecia ultimaria, the Channel Islands pug, is a moth of the family Geometridae. The species was first described by Jean Baptiste Boisduval in 1840. It can be found in Europe, where it is found in Portugal and Spain, coastal western and southern France, Italy, the Mediterranean islands including Cyprus and Greece. It is also found in southern England and the Channel Islands. Furthermore, it is present in North Africa (Morocco, Algeria, Tunisia, Libya, Egypt), Lebanon, Israel, Iraq and Iran.

The wingspan is 13–17 mm. Adults are on wing from late April to June and again from August to late October in two generations per year.

The larvae feed on Tamarix gallica.
