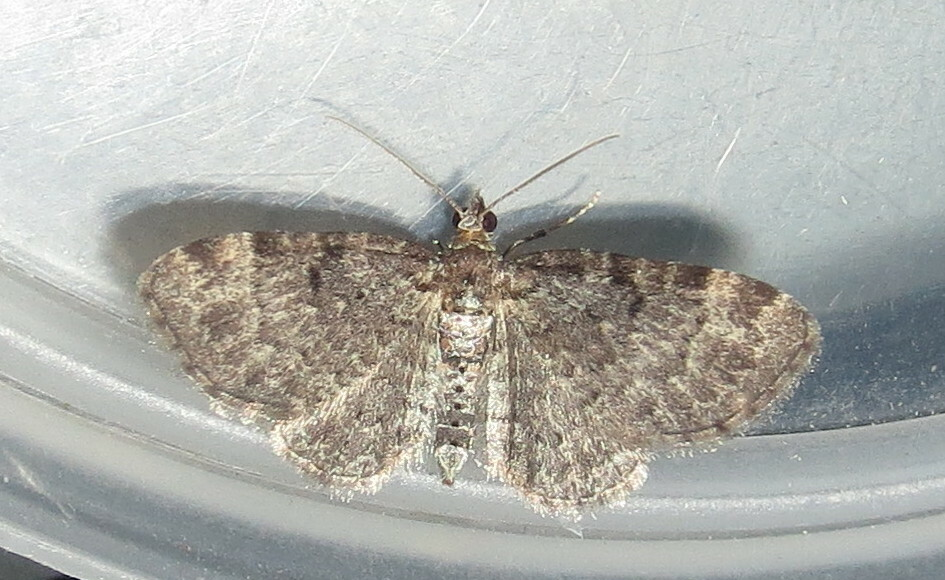

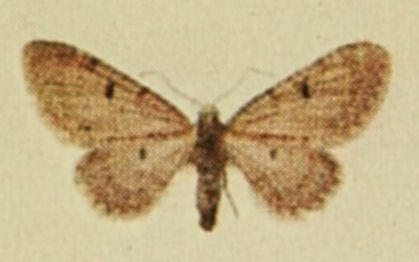
- Illustration depicting an unusually brown (Western) specimen

Scientific classification
- Domain: Eukaryota
- Kingdom: Animalia
- Phylum: Arthropoda
- Class: Insecta
- Order: Lepidoptera
- Family: Geometridae
- Genus: Eupithecia
- Species: E. distinctaria

Binomial name
- Eupithecia distinctaria Herrich-Schäffer, 1848

Synonyms
- Eupithecia albifronsata Graslin, 1863; Eupithecia heydenaria Staudinger, 1870

= Eupithecia distinctaria =

Species of moth

Eupithecia distinctaria, the thyme pug, is a moth of the family Geometridae. It is found throughout Europe. from Ireland, Britain and the Iberian Peninsula through western and central Europe then East to Russia (Volga-Don, East Caucasus, Western Caucasus, Kaliningrad) and Iran. In the north the range reaches as far as the southern Fennoscandia, to the south, where it is more common, it occupies the Mediterranean and Asia Minor. It is found primarily on warm, stony slopes and rocky structures as well as on sparse grassy areas with thyme mounds. In the Alps, it rises to heights of 2000 metres.

The wingspan is 16–20 mm The forewing ground colour is clear ash grey with or without an admixture of brownish. There is a dark costal patch and a very conspicuous black discal spot. The colour is darker towards the outer margin and there is a fine white wavy post discal line. The hindwings are pale, suffused darker brown at the outer margin. There is also a small fine black discal spot near the costal margin.sextiata Mill, is a lighter grey or whitish, rather strongly marked southern form, best known from Southern France.

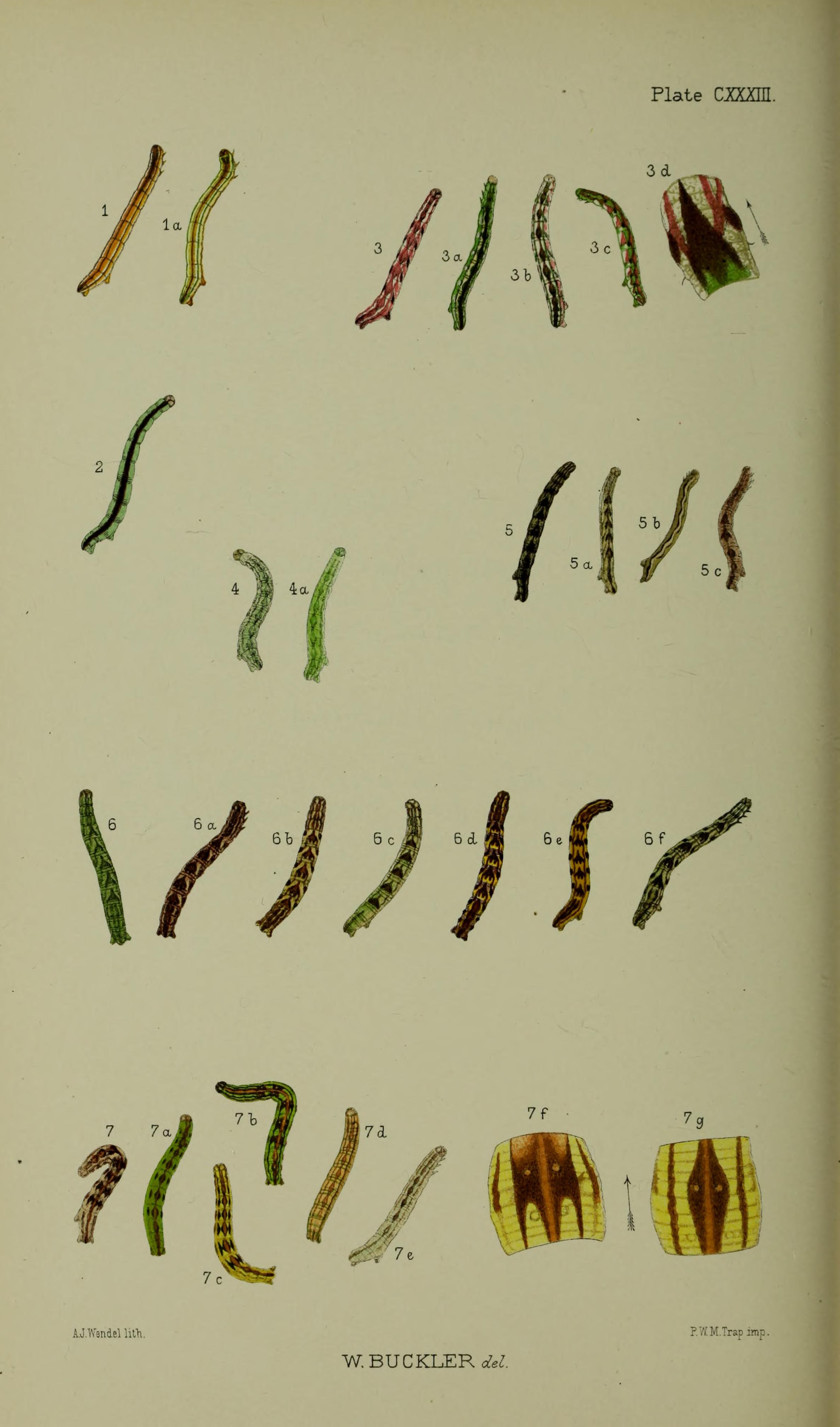
Fig.2 larvae after final moult

Last instar caterpillars are smooth and slender. They are mostly greenish colored and show a wide red back stripe. Sometimes monochrome red specimens appear. With these colours, they are superbly camouflaged on the flowers of their food plants.

The moth flies in June and July resting on stones by day.

Unsurprisingly, the larvae feed on thyme (Thymus (plant) spp.).

== Subspecies ==
- Eupithecia distinctaria distinctaria
- Eupithecia distinctaria constrictata Guenee, 1858
- Eupithecia distinctaria piemonticola Schwingenschuss, 1954
- Eupithecia distinctaria sextiata Dardoin & Milliere, 1867

== Similar species ==
- Eupithecia pimpinellata is distinguished by a dark brown saddle on the second abdominal segment.
- Eupithecia extraversaria Freshly hatched moths shimmer slightly violet grey. The caterpillars differ significantly E. extraversaria has a strong reddish-brown drawing on each body segment.

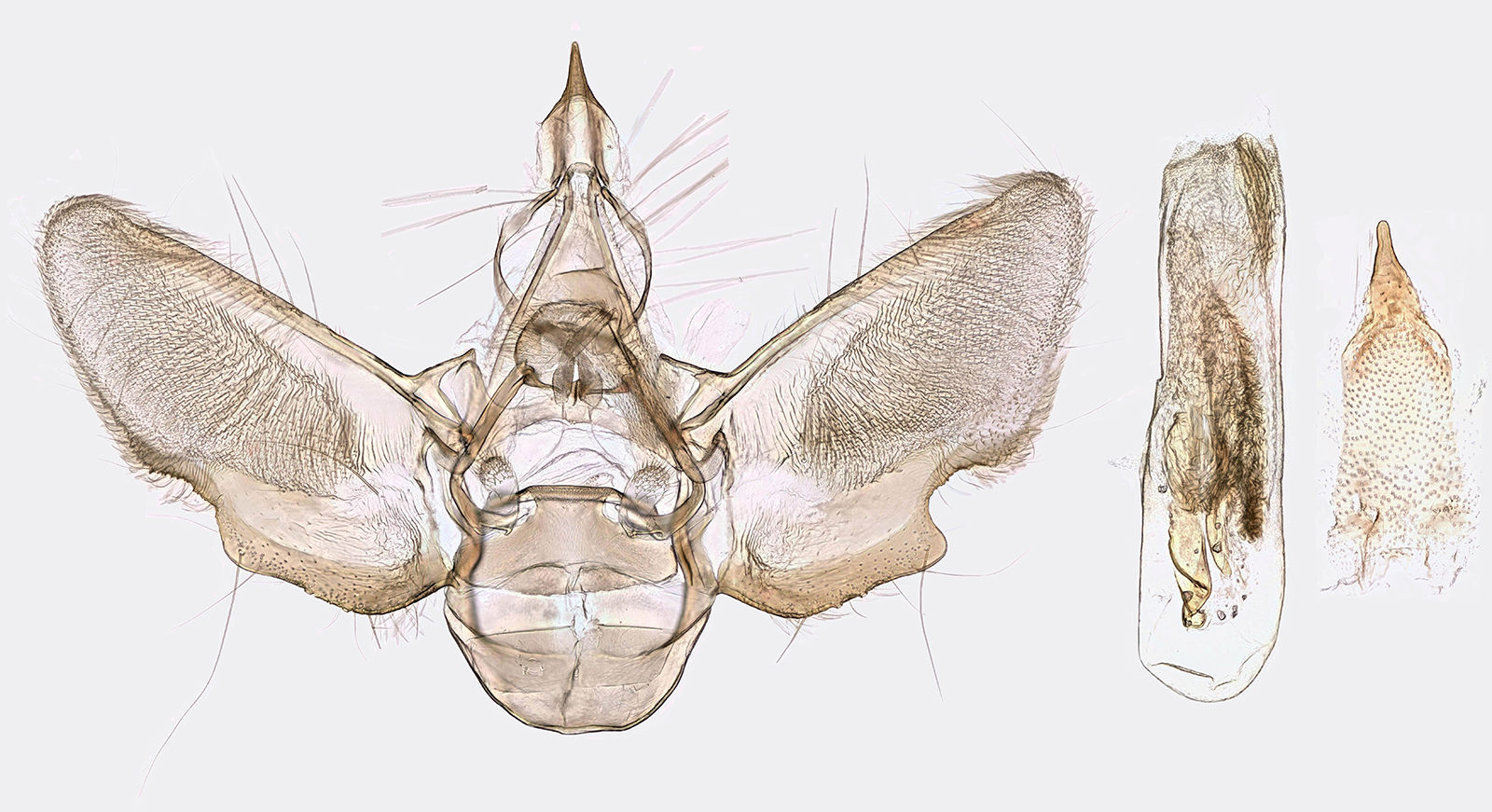
Male genitalia

Certain identification may require a genitalic preparation.
