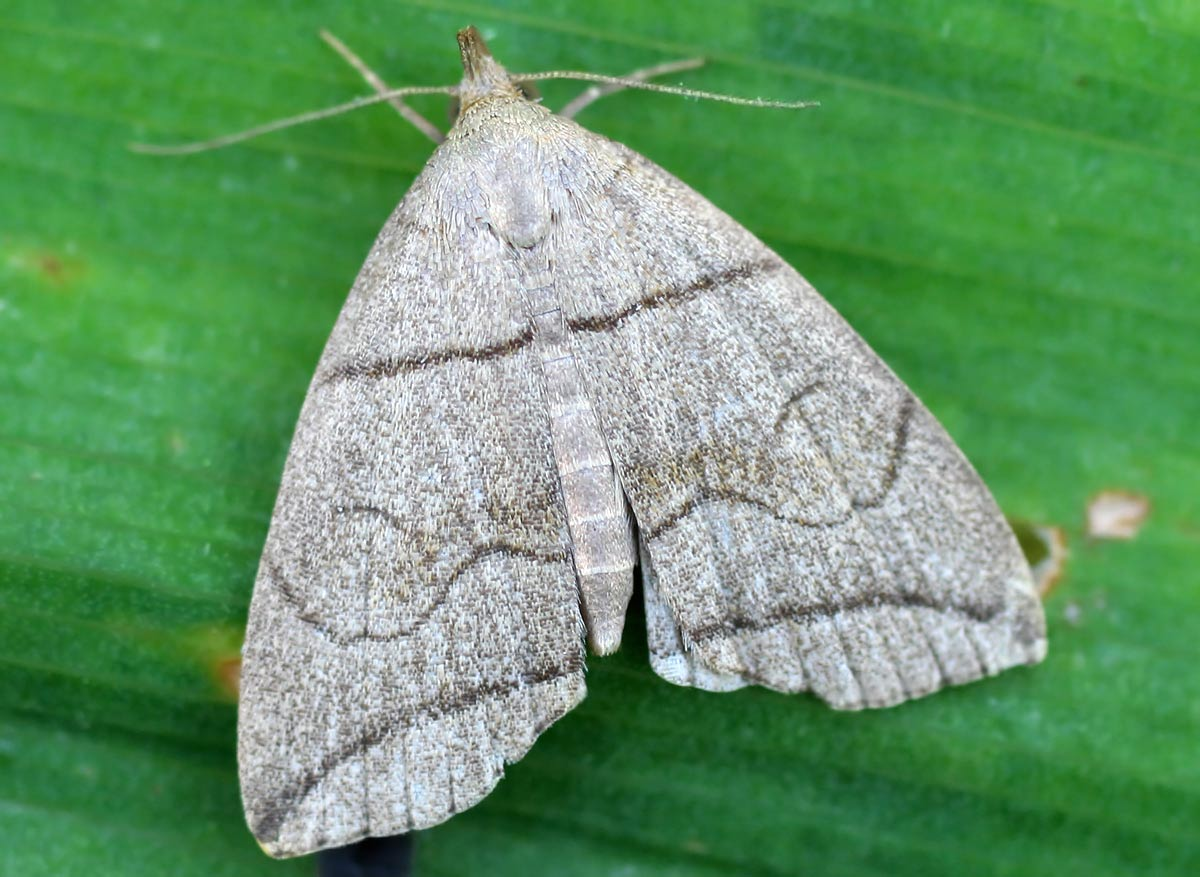

Scientific classification
- Domain: Eukaryota
- Kingdom: Animalia
- Phylum: Arthropoda
- Class: Insecta
- Order: Lepidoptera
- Superfamily: Noctuoidea
- Family: Erebidae
- Genus: Herminia
- Species: H. grisealis

Binomial name
- Herminia grisealis (Denis & Schiffermüller, 1775)

= Herminia grisealis =

Species of moth

Herminia grisealis, the small fan-foot, is a litter moth of the family Erebidae. It is found in Europe. The eastern expansion is across the Palearctic to the Ussuri River and after that Japan. In the Alps it rises up to a height of 1300 meters.

== Description ==
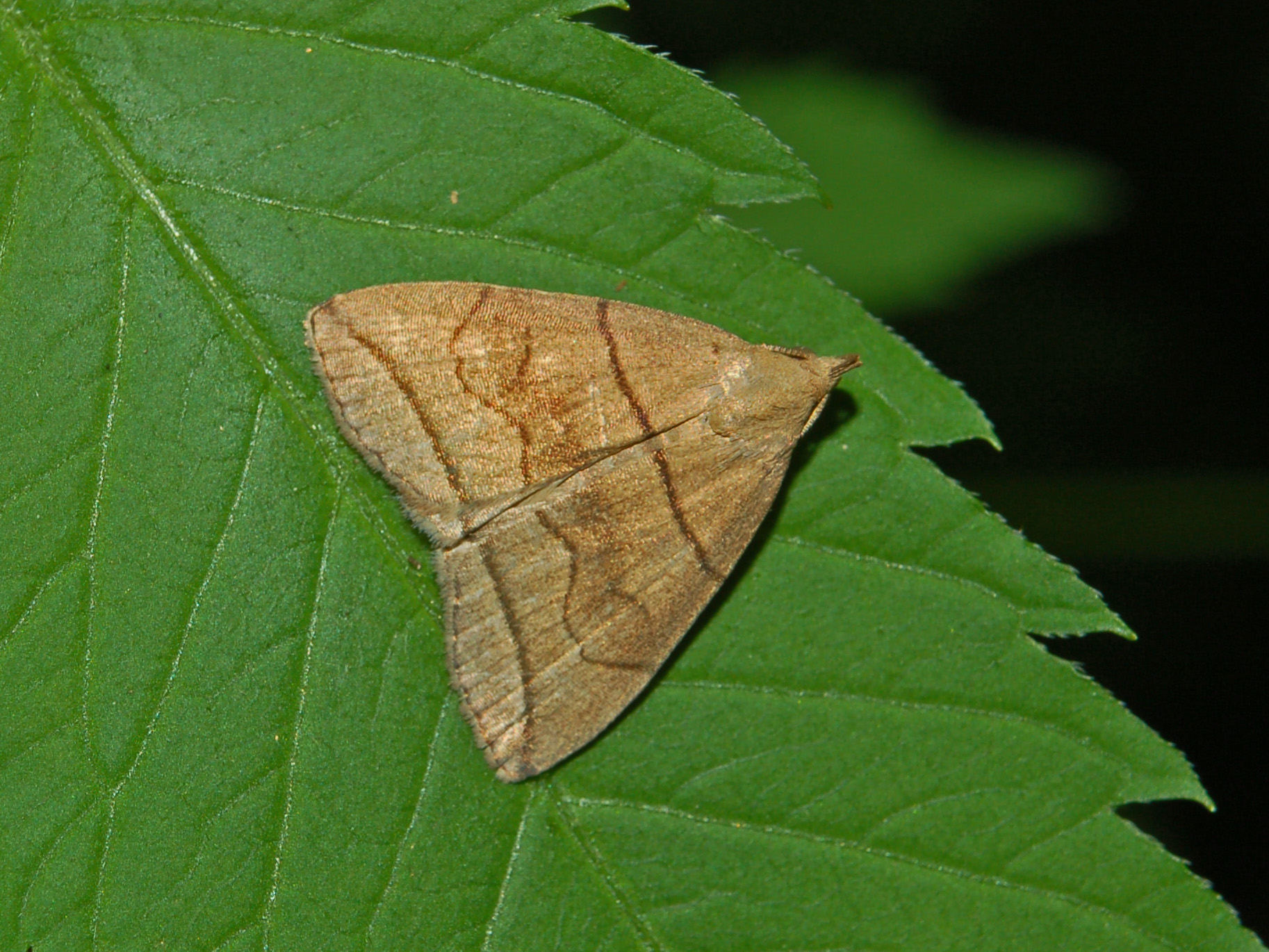
Herminia grisealis, brown form

The wingspan is 24–28 mm. The length of the forewings is 11–13 mm. This species shows three darker lines crossing the greyish brown wings. The top and the lower lines run straight or lightly curved, while the middle one is undulating.

== Technical description ==
The forewing is grey brown often with a yellow tinge; lines dark brown; the inner straight, oblique, thick; the subterminal thick, concave outwards, curving into apex; outer line fine, sickle shaped; a short dark line at end of cell; hindwing quite pale grey with outer and subterminal obscure lines.

== Biology ==
Small fan-foot usually rest during daylight, beginning their activities in early dusk. These moths fly in one or two generations from early May to mid-August..

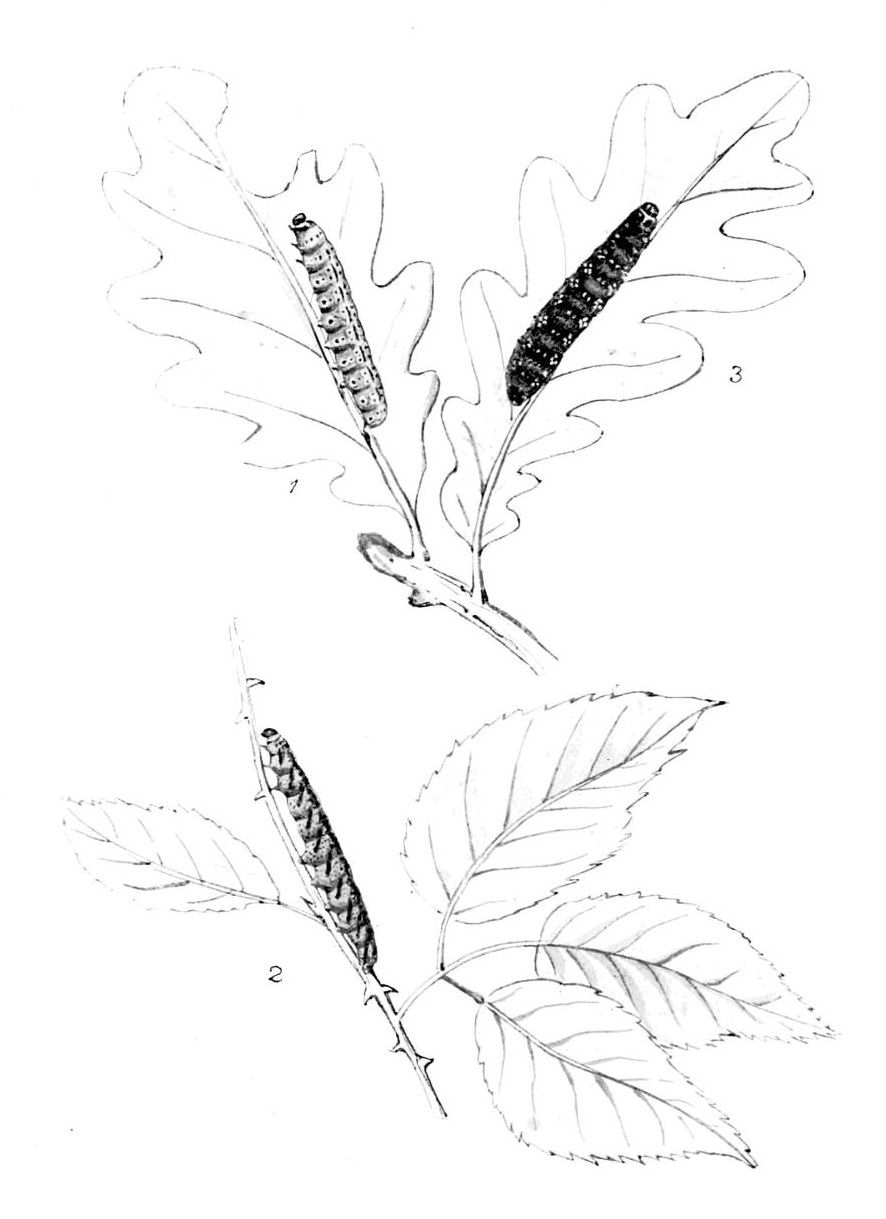
Larva (figure 1)

Larva is blackish grey, with a dorsal row of black triangles edged behind with yellowish grey, and black lateral oblique streaks; other descriptions make it reddish yellow grey. The larvae feed on various shrubs and deciduous trees such as oak, alder, birch, Crataegus, bird cherry, Corylus avellana, Rubus, Clematis vitalba and also fallen leaves.

== Notes ==
1. The flight season refers to Belgium and The Netherlands. This may vary in other parts of the range.
