= Dusona admontina =

Scientific classification
- Domain: Eukaryota
- Kingdom: Animalia
- Phylum: Arthropoda
- Class: Insecta
- Order: Hymenoptera
- Family: Ichneumonidae
- Genus: Dusona
- Species: D. admontina

Binomial name
- Dusona admontina (Speiser, 1908)

Synonyms
- Campoplex admontinus Speiser, 1908

Species of wasp

Dusona admontina is a species of parasitic wasp belonging to the family Ichneumonidae, subfamily Campopleginae. It is a parasitoid of the larvae of Herminia grisealis.

== Description ==
Head, antennae and thorax black. Central and posterior abdominal segments red or distinctly marked with red, basal segments mostly black. Coloration of legs varies between reddish brown to black. Petioloar suture complete. First gastral sternite finely coriaceous medially. Size 7–9 mm, 34–39 flagellomeres. D. admontia is very similar to other small species of Dusona but can be distinguished by a combination of the 3rd gastral tergite being separated from the epipleuron by a crease, the mesopleuron being densely rugose-punctate with the interspaces coriaceous and rather dull, the coloration of abdomen and the number of flagellomeres.

== Ecology ==
Dusona admontina has a short flight period between July and September. Females attack and lay their eggs in the larvae of the moth Herminia grisealis. The wasp's larva kills the host during its pupal stage and then spins a cocoon inside the now hollow pupa. The adult wasp emerges the following year.

== Distribution ==
Dusona admontina is known from throughout the palearctic region though concentrated in northern Europe. Known regions include Poland, Germany, Netherlands, Belgium, Great Britain, Austria, Romania, Sweden, Norway and Russia (including east Siberia).
