= Ardozyga desmatra =

Scientific classification
- Kingdom: Animalia
- Phylum: Arthropoda
- Clade: Pancrustacea
- Class: Insecta
- Order: Lepidoptera
- Family: Gelechiidae
- Genus: Ardozyga
- Species: A. desmatra

Binomial name
- Ardozyga desmatra (Lower, 1897)

Synonyms
- Gelechia desmatra Lower, 1897; Gelechia zygosema Lower, 1897; Gelechia zygosema Lower, 1899; Protolechia desmatra

Species of moth

Ardozyga desmatra is a species of moth in the family Gelechiidae. It was described by Oswald Bertram Lower in 1897. It is found in Australia, where it has been recorded from New South Wales, Victoria and South Australia.

The wingspan is 11–13 mm (0.43–0.51 in). The forewings are whitish, more or less wholly suffused with pale ochreous yellowish and with the extreme costal edge dark fuscous near the base. There is a moderate dark brown median fascia, with the extremities strongly angularly produced anteriorly, and slightly posteriorly. A dark brown patch occupies the apical fourth of the wing, produced anteriorly at the extremities to near the median fascia, enclosing several oblique white marks on the costa and a row of white scales before the termen. There is also a dark fuscous terminal line. The hindwings are light fuscous.
