= Ardozyga vacatella =

Scientific classification
- Kingdom: Animalia
- Phylum: Arthropoda
- Clade: Pancrustacea
- Class: Insecta
- Order: Lepidoptera
- Family: Gelechiidae
- Genus: Ardozyga
- Species: A. vacatella

Binomial name
- Ardozyga vacatella (Walker, 1864)

Synonyms
- Gelechia vacatella Walker, 1864; Protolechia vacatella

Species of moth

Ardozyga vacatella is a species of moth in the family Gelechiidae. It was described by Francis Walker in 1864. It is found in Australia, where it has been recorded from Queensland.

Adults are a cinereous-fawn colour, the forewings with brown and black speckles, of which there are very few towards the costa. There are some elongated black marks on the costa and an oblique black streak extending from the tip along part of the exterior border. A diffuse blackish stripe extends from the base near the interior border and the exterior border is extremely oblique. The hindwings are cinereous.
