= Ardozyga liota =

Scientific classification
- Kingdom: Animalia
- Phylum: Arthropoda
- Clade: Pancrustacea
- Class: Insecta
- Order: Lepidoptera
- Family: Gelechiidae
- Genus: Ardozyga
- Species: A. liota

Binomial name
- Ardozyga liota (Meyrick, 1904)

Synonyms
- Protolechia liota Meyrick, 1904

Species of moth

Ardozyga liota is a species of moth in the family Gelechiidae. It was described by Edward Meyrick in 1904. It is found in Australia, where it has been recorded from Western Australia.

The wingspan is about 12 mm (0.47 in). The forewings are light grey, densely and suffusedly irrorated (speckled) with white, and sprinkled with dark fuscous. The stigmata are moderate, blackish, with the plical obliquely beyond the first discal. There are some blackish dots along the posterior half of the costa. The hindwings are whitish-grey.
