= Ardozyga chenias =

Scientific classification
- Kingdom: Animalia
- Phylum: Arthropoda
- Clade: Pancrustacea
- Class: Insecta
- Order: Lepidoptera
- Family: Gelechiidae
- Genus: Ardozyga
- Species: A. chenias

Binomial name
- Ardozyga chenias (Meyrick, 1904)

Synonyms
- Protolechia chenias Meyrick, 1904

Species of moth

Ardozyga chenias is a species of moth in the family Gelechiidae. It was described by Edward Meyrick in 1904. It is found in Australia, where it has been recorded from New South Wales and Victoria.

== Characteristics ==
The wingspan is about 16 mm (0.63 in). The forewings are fuscous, sprinkled with whitish and sometimes with dark fuscous, towards the costa posteriorly much suffused with white. There is a small dark fuscous spot on the base of the costa and a white mark from the base in the middle, as well as narrow very oblique dark fuscous marks from the costa at one-fifth, and before and beyond the middle, with patches of ferruginous suffusion beneath them. A streak of ferruginous suffusion, including some black scales, is found in the disc from one-fourth to three-fourths, and another on the fold. There is also a series of blackish marks beneath the posterior third of the costa and along the termen, preceded by a rather broad ferruginous suffusion. The hindwings are pale grey, darker posteriorly.
