= Ardozyga penthicodes =

Scientific classification
- Kingdom: Animalia
- Phylum: Arthropoda
- Clade: Pancrustacea
- Class: Insecta
- Order: Lepidoptera
- Family: Gelechiidae
- Genus: Ardozyga
- Species: A. penthicodes

Binomial name
- Ardozyga penthicodes (Meyrick, 1921)

Synonyms
- Protolechia penthicodes Meyrick, 1921

Species of moth

Ardozyga penthicodes is a species of moth in the family Gelechiidae. It was described by Edward Meyrick in 1921. It is found in Australia, where it has been recorded from southern Queensland.

The wingspan is about 16 mm (0.63 in). The forewings are fuscous with a very irregular streak of white suffusion running from the base of the costa through the middle of the disc to the termen beneath the apex, with undefined branches of white irroration along the veins towards the costa. There is a narrow black streak along the fold throughout, edged beneath by a suffused white streak towards the middle and nearly interrupted with white in the middle. There are also short longitudinal streaks of dark fuscous irroration representing the discal stigmata, and similar marks towards the posterior portion of the costa and termen between the veins. The hindwings are rather dark grey, thinly scaled at the base and with a broad dark fuscous streak occupying the costal third throughout.
