= Ardozyga trachyphanes =

Scientific classification
- Kingdom: Animalia
- Phylum: Arthropoda
- Clade: Pancrustacea
- Class: Insecta
- Order: Lepidoptera
- Family: Gelechiidae
- Genus: Ardozyga
- Species: A. trachyphanes

Binomial name
- Ardozyga trachyphanes (Meyrick, 1904)

Synonyms
- Protolechia trachyphanes Meyrick, 1904

Species of moth

Ardozyga trachyphanes is a species of moth in the family Gelechiidae. It was described by Edward Meyrick in 1904. It is found in Australia, where it has been recorded from Western Australia.

The wingspan is 9–10 mm (0.35–0.39 in). The forewings are light grey, irregularly irrorated with white and dark fuscous and with blackish subcostal and dorsal marks near the base, and a plical mark beyond these. The stigmata are rather large, cloudy, dark fuscous, with the plical rather beyond the first discal. The posterior half of the costa and termen have alternate cloudy spots of white and dark fuscous irroration. The hindwings are whitish-grey, becoming grey towards the apex.
