= Ardozyga pyrrhica =

Scientific classification
- Kingdom: Animalia
- Phylum: Arthropoda
- Clade: Pancrustacea
- Class: Insecta
- Order: Lepidoptera
- Family: Gelechiidae
- Genus: Ardozyga
- Species: A. pyrrhica

Binomial name
- Ardozyga pyrrhica (Turner, 1919)

Synonyms
- Protolechia pyrrhica Turner, 1919

Species of moth

Ardozyga pyrrhica is a species of moth in the family Gelechiidae. It was described by Alfred Jefferis Turner in 1919. It is found in Australia, where it has been recorded from Queensland.

The wingspan is about 11 mm (0.43 in). The forewings are reddish brown. The stigmata are obsolete, but there is a fine fuscous line on the apical half of the costa interrupted by several minute whitish-ochreous dots. A dark-fuscous apical spot gives off a fine line along the upper part of the termen. The hindwings are grey.
