= Ardozyga arganthes =

Scientific classification
- Kingdom: Animalia
- Phylum: Arthropoda
- Clade: Pancrustacea
- Class: Insecta
- Order: Lepidoptera
- Family: Gelechiidae
- Genus: Ardozyga
- Species: A. arganthes

Binomial name
- Ardozyga arganthes (Meyrick, 1904)

Synonyms
- Protolechia arganthes Meyrick, 1904

Species of moth

Ardozyga arganthes is a species of moth in the family Gelechiidae. It was described by Edward Meyrick in 1904. It is found in Australia, where it has been recorded from Queensland.

The wingspan is about 11 mm (0.43 in). The forewings are ochreous-white, with a few fuscous scales and with the markings fuscous mixed with blackish. There is a narrow straight basal fascia and an oblique mark on the costa at one-fifth. The stigmata are rather large, irregular, with the plical somewhat beyond the first discal, confluent with a blotch on the middle of the dorsum, an additional dot between and above the first and second discal, confluent with a blotch on the costa before the middle, and an additional dot beneath the second discal, confluent with a broad irregular suffused subterminal fascia. The hindwings are grey.
