= Ardozyga decaspila =

Scientific classification
- Kingdom: Animalia
- Phylum: Arthropoda
- Clade: Pancrustacea
- Class: Insecta
- Order: Lepidoptera
- Family: Gelechiidae
- Genus: Ardozyga
- Species: A. decaspila

Binomial name
- Ardozyga decaspila (Lower, 1899)

Synonyms
- Gelechia decaspila Lower, 1899; Protolechia decaspila

Species of moth

Ardozyga decaspila is a species of moth in the family Gelechiidae. It was described by Oswald Bertram Lower in 1899. It is found in Australia, where it has been recorded from Victoria.

The wingspan is 13–16 mm (0.51–0.63 in). The forewings are whitish ochreous, partially tinged with yellowish, and sprinkled with ferruginous and sometimes with dark fuscous. There are five oblique wedge-shaped dark fuscous marks on the costa, the last two confluent. There is also a dark fuscous mark on the base of the dorsum. The stigmata are small or moderate, blackish, accompanied with ferruginous, the plical obliquely beyond the first discal, the second discal produced posteriorly into a longitudinal blackish ferruginous-edged mark, tending to connect with a similar upright mark from the tornus. There is also a small ferruginous patch along the tornus, including a terminal row of cloudy blackish dots. The hindwings are light grey with a whitish-ochreous subdorsal pencil of hairs.
