= Ardozyga microdora =

Scientific classification
- Kingdom: Animalia
- Phylum: Arthropoda
- Clade: Pancrustacea
- Class: Insecta
- Order: Lepidoptera
- Family: Gelechiidae
- Genus: Ardozyga
- Species: A. microdora

Binomial name
- Ardozyga microdora (Meyrick, 1904)

Synonyms
- Protolechia microdora Meyrick, 1904

Species of moth

Ardozyga microdora is a species of moth in the family Gelechiidae. It was described by Edward Meyrick in 1904. It is found in Australia, where it has been recorded from Western Australia.

The wingspan is about 10 mm (0.39 in). The forewings are light grey, somewhat sprinkled with dark grey. The stigmata are dark fuscous, with the plical obliquely beyond the first discal. The costa posteriorly with obscure indications of alternate whitish and darker spots. The hindwings are light grey, darker posteriorly.
