= Ardozyga haemaspila =

Scientific classification
- Kingdom: Animalia
- Phylum: Arthropoda
- Clade: Pancrustacea
- Class: Insecta
- Order: Lepidoptera
- Family: Gelechiidae
- Genus: Ardozyga
- Species: A. haemaspila

Binomial name
- Ardozyga haemaspila (Lower, 1894)

Synonyms
- Gelechia haemaspila Lower, 1894; Protolechia haemaspila; Gelechia nana Lower, 1894

Species of moth

Ardozyga haemaspila is a species of moth in the family Gelechiidae. It was described by Oswald Bertram Lower in 1894. It is found in Australia, where it has been recorded from New South Wales and South Australia.

The wingspan is 15–16 mm (0.59–0.63 in). The forewings are pale ochreous, variably tinged with reddish, whitish, or brownish, the veins often marked with streaks of dark fuscous irroration (sprinkles). There are about six more-or-less indistinct small dark fuscous spots on the costa and a reddish-ochreous dot on the dorsum at one-fourth, and another (sometimes blackish) in the disc above it. A transverse reddish-ochreous or ferruginous blotch is found in the disc at two-fifths, sometimes edged with dark fuscous and whitish, sometimes very indistinct. The second discal stigma is blackish, usually with a similar dot beneath it and there is sometimes a black streak along the fold from near the base to the middle, and another in the disc from two-fifths to the termen beneath the apex. The hindwings are grey.
