= Ardozyga loemias =

Scientific classification
- Kingdom: Animalia
- Phylum: Arthropoda
- Clade: Pancrustacea
- Class: Insecta
- Order: Lepidoptera
- Family: Gelechiidae
- Genus: Ardozyga
- Species: A. loemias

Binomial name
- Ardozyga loemias (Meyrick, 1904)

Synonyms
- Protolechia loemias Meyrick, 1904

Species of moth

Ardozyga loemias is a species of moth in the family Gelechiidae. It was described by Edward Meyrick in 1904. It is found in Australia, where it has been recorded from New South Wales and Victoria.

The wingspan is 16–19 mm (0.63–0.75 in). The forewings are light fuscous, sprinkled with dark fuscous and blackish between the veins, which appear as light streaks. There are small indistinct dark fuscous spots on the costa at the base and one-sixth and along the posterior half. There is also an irregular transverse dark fuscous blotch in the disc at one-third, a dot above the middle of the disc, and two transversely placed at three-fifths, as well as a terminal series of small indistinct dark fuscous spots between the veins. The hindwings are grey, darker posteriorly.
