= Ardozyga molyntis =

Scientific classification
- Kingdom: Animalia
- Phylum: Arthropoda
- Clade: Pancrustacea
- Class: Insecta
- Order: Lepidoptera
- Family: Gelechiidae
- Genus: Ardozyga
- Species: A. molyntis

Binomial name
- Ardozyga molyntis (Meyrick, 1904)

Synonyms
- Protolechia molyntis Meyrick, 1904

Species of moth

Ardozyga molyntis is a species of moth in the family Gelechiidae. It was described by Edward Meyrick in 1904. It is found in Australia, where it has been recorded from Victoria and South Australia.

The wingspan is 12–14 mm (0.47–0.55 in). The forewings are fuscous sprinkled with dark fuscous. The stigmata are dark fuscous, with the plical obliquely beyond the first discal, an additional dot beneath the second discal. There is an angulated series of dark fuscous dots beneath the posterior part of the costa and before the termen. The hindwings are fuscous.
