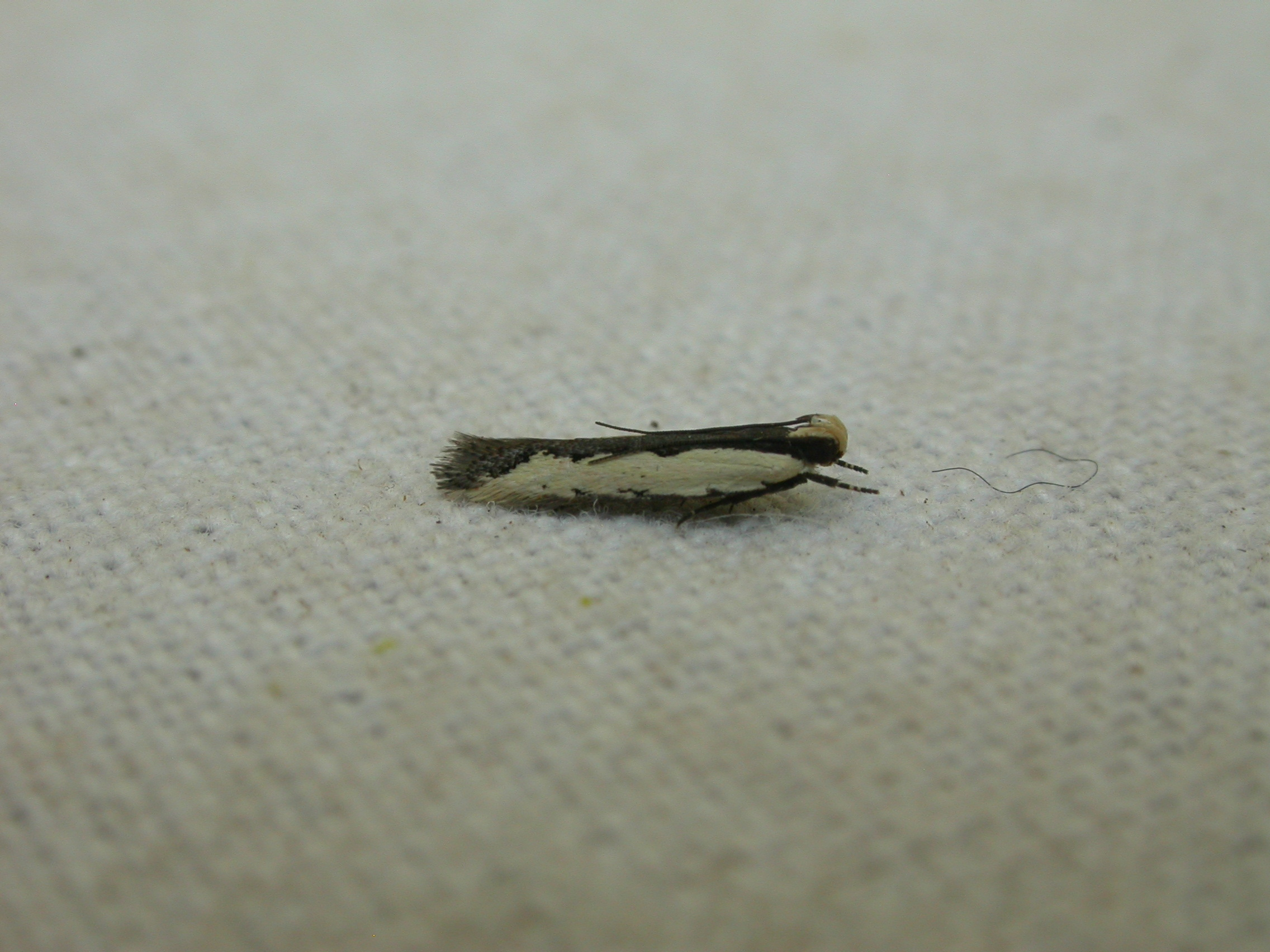
- Ardozyga mesochra

Scientific classification
- Kingdom: Animalia
- Phylum: Arthropoda
- Clade: Pancrustacea
- Class: Insecta
- Order: Lepidoptera
- Family: Gelechiidae
- Subfamily: Gelechiinae
- Genus: Ardozyga; Lower, 1902

Synonyms
- Protolechia Meyrick, 1903; Prodosiarcha Meyrick, 1904; Protolechia Meyrick, 1904; Lexiarcha Meyrick, 1916; Phyzanica Turner, 1917; Semocharista Meyrick, 1922; Baryzancla Turner, 1932; Baryzancla Turner, 1933; Brachyzancla Turner, 1947

= Ardozyga =

Genus of moths

Ardozyga is a genus of moths that belongs to the family Gelechiidae.

== Species ==
- Ardozyga aclera (Meyrick, 1904)
- Ardozyga acrocrossa (Turner, 1947)
- Ardozyga acroleuca (Meyrick, 1904)
- Ardozyga actinota (Meyrick, 1904)
- Ardozyga aeolopis (Meyrick, 1904)
- Ardozyga amblopis (Meyrick, 1904)
- Ardozyga amphiplaca (Meyrick, 1932)
- Ardozyga ananeura (Meyrick, 1904)
- Ardozyga annularia (Turner, 1919)
- Ardozyga anthracina (Meyrick, 1904)
- Ardozyga arenaria (Turner, 1933)
- Ardozyga arganthes (Meyrick, 1904)
- Ardozyga argocentra (Meyrick, 1904)
- Ardozyga aspetodes (Meyrick, 1904)
- Ardozyga autopis (Meyrick, 1904)
- Ardozyga aversella (Walker, 1864)
- Ardozyga banausodes (Meyrick, 1904)
- Ardozyga bistrigata (Meyrick, 1921)
- Ardozyga caminopis (Meyrick, 1904)
- Ardozyga catadamanta (Diakonoff, 1954)
- Ardozyga catarrhacta (Meyrick, 1904)
- Ardozyga celidophora (Turner, 1919)
- Ardozyga cephalota (Meyrick, 1904)
- Ardozyga ceramica (Meyrick, 1904)
- Ardozyga chalazodes (Turner, 1919)
- Ardozyga chenias (Meyrick, 1904)
- Ardozyga chionoprora (Turner, 1927)
- Ardozyga chiradia (Meyrick, 1904)
- Ardozyga cladara (Meyrick, 1904)
- Ardozyga compsochroa (Meyrick, 1904)
- Ardozyga cosmotis (Meyrick, 1904)
- Ardozyga creperrima (Turner, 1919)
- Ardozyga crotalodes (Meyrick, 1904)
- Ardozyga crypsibatis (Meyrick, 1904)
- Ardozyga crypsicneca (Turner, 1927)
- Ardozyga cryptosperma (Meyrick, 1921)
- Ardozyga decaspila (Lower, 1899)
- Ardozyga deltodes (Lower, 1896)
- Ardozyga desmatra (Lower, 1897)
- Ardozyga diplanetis (Meyrick, 1904)
- Ardozyga dysclyta (Turner, 1933)
- Ardozyga dysphanes (Turner, 1947)
- Ardozyga diplonesa (Meyrick, 1904)
- Ardozyga elassopis (Turner, 1919)
- Ardozyga elpistis (Meyrick, 1904)
- Ardozyga emmeles (Turner, 1933)
- Ardozyga enchotypa (Turner, 1919)
- Ardozyga englypta (Meyrick, 1904)
- Ardozyga eumela (Lower, 1897)
- Ardozyga euprepta (Turner, 1933)
- Ardozyga euryarga (Turner, 1919)
- Ardozyga eustephana (Turner, 1919)
- Ardozyga exarista (Meyrick, 1904)
- Ardozyga flexilis (Meyrick, 1904)
- Ardozyga frugalis (Meyrick, 1904)
- Ardozyga furcifera (Turner, 1919)
- Ardozyga galactopa (Meyrick, 1916)
- Ardozyga glagera (Turner, 1919)
- Ardozyga gorgonias (Meyrick, 1904)
- Ardozyga gypsocrana (Turner, 1919)
- Ardozyga haemaspila (Lower, 1894)
- Ardozyga hedana (Turner, 1919)
- Ardozyga hilara (Turner, 1919)
- Ardozyga hormodes (Meyrick, 1904)
- Ardozyga hylias (Meyrick, 1904)
- Ardozyga hypocneca (Turner, 1919)
- Ardozyga hypoleuca (Meyrick, 1904)
- Ardozyga idiospila (Meyrick, 1922)
- Ardozyga invalida (Meyrick, 1904)
- Ardozyga involuta (Turner, 1919)
- Ardozyga iochlaena (Meyrick, 1904)
- Ardozyga irobela (Turner, 1947)
- Ardozyga ithygramma (Turner, 1933)
- Ardozyga liota (Meyrick, 1904)
- Ardozyga lithina (Lower, 1899)
- Ardozyga loemias (Meyrick, 1904)
- Ardozyga loxodesma (Meyrick, 1904)
- Ardozyga mechanistis (Meyrick, 1904)
- Ardozyga megalommata (Meyrick, 1904)
- Ardozyga megalosticta (Turner, 1919)
- Ardozyga melicrata (Turner, 1919)
- Ardozyga mesochra (Lower, 1894)
- Ardozyga mesopsamma (Turner, 1919)
- Ardozyga microdora (Meyrick, 1904)
- Ardozyga micropa (Meyrick, 1904)
- Ardozyga molyntis (Meyrick, 1904)
- Ardozyga nephelota (Meyrick, 1904)
- Ardozyga neurosticha (Turner, 1933)
- Ardozyga nothrodes (Meyrick, 1921)
- Ardozyga nyctias (Meyrick, 1904)
- Ardozyga obeliscota (Meyrick, 1904)
- Ardozyga obscura (Turner, 1933)
- Ardozyga ochrobathra (Turner, 1933)
- Ardozyga odorifera (Meyrick, 1904)
- Ardozyga orthanotos (Lower, 1900)
- Ardozyga pacifica (Meyrick, 1904)
- Ardozyga pelogenes (Meyrick, 1906)
- Ardozyga pelogramma (Meyrick, 1904)
- Ardozyga penthicodes (Meyrick, 1921)
- Ardozyga phasianis (Meyrick, 1904)
- Ardozyga phloeodes (Meyrick, 1904)
- Ardozyga plinthactis (Meyrick, 1904)
- Ardozyga poenicea (Turner, 1947)
- Ardozyga polioxysta (Turner, 1933)
- Ardozyga prisca (Meyrick, 1904)
- Ardozyga proscripta (Meyrick, 1921)
- Ardozyga psephias (Meyrick, 1904)
- Ardozyga pyrrhica (Turner, 1919)
- Ardozyga sarisias (Meyrick, 1904)
- Ardozyga sciodes (Meyrick, 1904)
- Ardozyga scytina (Meyrick, 1904)
- Ardozyga secta (Meyrick, 1921)
- Ardozyga semiographa (Turner, 1919)
- Ardozyga sisyraea (Meyrick, 1904)
- Ardozyga sodalisella (Walker, 1864)
- Ardozyga sporodeta (Turner, 1919)
- Ardozyga stratifera (Meyrick, 1904)
- Ardozyga subnexella (Walker, 1864)
- Ardozyga tabulata (Meyrick, 1904)
- Ardozyga taracta (Turner, 1919)
- Ardozyga telopis (Meyrick, 1904)
- Ardozyga temenitis (Meyrick, 1904)
- Ardozyga tetralychna Lower, 1902
- Ardozyga tetraploa (Meyrick, 1904)
- Ardozyga thanatodes (Lower, 1893)
- Ardozyga thermoplaca Lower, 1902
- Ardozyga thyridota (Meyrick, 1904)
- Ardozyga thyrsoptera (Meyrick, 1904)
- Ardozyga trachyphanes (Meyrick, 1904)
- Ardozyga trichalina (Meyrick, 1904)
- Ardozyga trichosema (Meyrick, 1904)
- Ardozyga trichroma (Turner, 1933)
- Ardozyga tridecta (Lower, 1900)
- Ardozyga trochias (Meyrick, 1921)
- Ardozyga tyroessa (Turner, 1933)
- Ardozyga vacatella (Walker, 1864)
- Ardozyga voluta (Meyrick, 1904)
- Ardozyga xanthocephala (Meyrick, 1904)
- Ardozyga xestolitha (Meyrick, 1904)
- Ardozyga xuthias (Meyrick, 1904)

=== Excluded species ===
- Brachyzancla sporima Turner, 1947
