= Ardozyga trichosema =

Scientific classification
- Kingdom: Animalia
- Phylum: Arthropoda
- Clade: Pancrustacea
- Class: Insecta
- Order: Lepidoptera
- Family: Gelechiidae
- Genus: Ardozyga
- Species: A. trichosema

Binomial name
- Ardozyga trichosema (Meyrick, 1904)

Synonyms
- Protolechia trichosema Meyrick, 1904

Species of moth

Ardozyga trichosema is a species of moth in the family Gelechiidae. It was described by Edward Meyrick in 1904. It is found in Australia, where it has been recorded from Western Australia.

The wingspan is about 12 mm (0.47 in). The forewings are pale fuscous, mixed with whitish towards the dorsum and posteriorly, and with a few dark fuscous scales, as well as a very broad irregular-edged white costal streak from the base to five-sixths, partially limited beneath by a black plical streak from near the base to the middle, and another connecting two discal stigmata, and with some dark fuscous scales round its apex. The hindwings are grey.
