= Ardozyga thyridota =

Scientific classification
- Kingdom: Animalia
- Phylum: Arthropoda
- Clade: Pancrustacea
- Class: Insecta
- Order: Lepidoptera
- Family: Gelechiidae
- Genus: Ardozyga
- Species: A. thyridota

Binomial name
- Ardozyga thyridota (Meyrick, 1904)

Synonyms
- Protolechia thyridota Meyrick, 1904

Species of moth

Ardozyga thyridota is a species of moth in the family Gelechiidae. It was described by Edward Meyrick in 1904. It is found in Australia, where it has been recorded from New South Wales and South Australia.

The wingspan is about 9 mm (0.35 in). The forewings are light brown, slightly purple-tinged, irrorated with black and sometimes with whitish and there are five obscure oblique series of undefined spots of blackish irroration, the first (subbasal) and median most conspicuous. The hindwings are fuscous, darker posteriorly, with a well-marked transparent patch towards the base.
