= Ardozyga furcifera =

Scientific classification
- Kingdom: Animalia
- Phylum: Arthropoda
- Clade: Pancrustacea
- Class: Insecta
- Order: Lepidoptera
- Family: Gelechiidae
- Genus: Ardozyga
- Species: A. furcifera

Binomial name
- Ardozyga furcifera (Turner, 1919)

Synonyms
- Protolechia furcifera Turner, 1919

Species of moth

Ardozyga furcifera is a species of moth in the family Gelechiidae. It was described by Alfred Jefferis Turner in 1919. It is found in Australia, where it has been recorded from Victoria.

The wingspan is 18–20 mm (0.71–0.79 in). The forewings are reddish-brown, the costal area whitish with fuscous irroration and with a blackish costal mark at one-third. There is a fine whitish subcostal line from the middle, edged beneath with blackish, and giving off four short whitish streaks to the apical third of the costa and apex. An irregular whitish longitudinal streak is found above the middle, edged beneath with blackish from the base, giving off an oblique streak at the middle to the subcostal line. Soon after, it forks, each arm of the fork is deflected upwards into the sub-costal line. There are some blackish scales on the fold, on the base of the dorsum, and on the termen. The hindwings are pale-grey.
