= Ardozyga glagera =

Scientific classification
- Kingdom: Animalia
- Phylum: Arthropoda
- Clade: Pancrustacea
- Class: Insecta
- Order: Lepidoptera
- Family: Gelechiidae
- Genus: Ardozyga
- Species: A. glagera

Binomial name
- Ardozyga glagera (Turner, 1919)

Synonyms
- Prodosiarcha glagera Turner, 1919

Species of moth

Ardozyga glagera is a species of moth in the family Gelechiidae. It was described by Alfred Jefferis Turner in 1919. It is found in Australia, where it has been recorded from Queensland.

The wingspan is about 11 mm (0.43 in). The forewings are whitish, with pale ochreous-grey irroration which forms slender streaks along the fold, from the base of the costa through the disc to the apex, and along the costa. The hindwings are whitish.
