= Ardozyga pacifica =

Scientific classification
- Kingdom: Animalia
- Phylum: Arthropoda
- Clade: Pancrustacea
- Class: Insecta
- Order: Lepidoptera
- Family: Gelechiidae
- Genus: Ardozyga
- Species: A. pacifica

Binomial name
- Ardozyga pacifica (Meyrick, 1904)

Synonyms
- Protolechia pacifica Meyrick, 1904; Protolechia leptosticta Turner, 1919

Species of moth

Ardozyga pacifica is a species of moth in the family Gelechiidae. It was described by Edward Meyrick in 1904. It is found in Australia, where it has been recorded from New South Wales, Western Australia and Victoria.

The wingspan is 10–12 mm (0.39–0.47 in). The forewings are light greyish-ochreous, irregularly sprinkled with white and dark fuscous. The markings are cloudy, formed of dark golden-brown irroration mixed with dark fuscous. There are small spots at the base of the costa and dorsum and a dorsal suffusion from one-fourth to near the tornus. The stigmata are rather large, the plical somewhat beyond the first discal. There is a small undefined white costal spot before the middle and a broad undefined fascia from the costa beyond this to the tornus. The hindwings are whitish-grey.
