= Ardozyga acroleuca =

Scientific classification
- Kingdom: Animalia
- Phylum: Arthropoda
- Clade: Pancrustacea
- Class: Insecta
- Order: Lepidoptera
- Family: Gelechiidae
- Genus: Ardozyga
- Species: A. acroleuca

Binomial name
- Ardozyga acroleuca (Meyrick, 1904)

Synonyms
- Protolechia acroleuca Meyrick, 1904

Species of moth

Ardozyga acroleuca is a species of moth in the family Gelechiidae. It was described by Edward Meyrick in 1904. It is found in Australia, where it has been recorded from New South Wales and Victoria.

The wingspan is about 12 mm (0.47 in). The forewings are purplish-fuscous with a moderate irregular-edged oblique ochreous-white fascia from two-thirds of the costa, reaching three-fourths across the wing. There is a white dot on the costa beyond the middle and an ochreous-white patch occupying the apical fourth of the wing, but mixed with dark fuscous scales on the margins. The hindwings are fuscous.
