= Ardozyga arenaria =

Scientific classification
- Kingdom: Animalia
- Phylum: Arthropoda
- Clade: Pancrustacea
- Class: Insecta
- Order: Lepidoptera
- Family: Gelechiidae
- Genus: Ardozyga
- Species: A. arenaria

Binomial name
- Ardozyga arenaria (Turner, 1933)

Synonyms
- Protolechia arenaria Turner, 1933

Species of moth

Ardozyga arenaria is a species of moth in the family Gelechiidae. It was described by Alfred Jefferis Turner in 1933. It is found in Australia, where it has been recorded from Queensland.
