= Ardozyga sciodes =

Scientific classification
- Kingdom: Animalia
- Phylum: Arthropoda
- Clade: Pancrustacea
- Class: Insecta
- Order: Lepidoptera
- Family: Gelechiidae
- Genus: Ardozyga
- Species: A. sciodes

Binomial name
- Ardozyga sciodes (Meyrick, 1904)

Synonyms
- Protolechia sciodes Meyrick, 1904

Species of moth

Ardozyga sciodes is a species of moth in the family Gelechiidae. It was described by Edward Meyrick in 1904. It is found in Australia, where it has been recorded from Western Australia.

The wingspan is about 11 mm (0.43 in). The forewings are fuscous, finely irrorated with white, more strongly and suffusedly towards the costa, the costal edge quite white. The stigmata are indistinctly dark fuscous, the plical obliquely beyond the first discal, another similar dot beneath the second discal. The hindwings are grey-whitish.
