= Ardozyga mesopsamma =

Scientific classification
- Kingdom: Animalia
- Phylum: Arthropoda
- Clade: Pancrustacea
- Class: Insecta
- Order: Lepidoptera
- Family: Gelechiidae
- Genus: Ardozyga
- Species: A. mesopsamma

Binomial name
- Ardozyga mesopsamma (Turner, 1919)

Synonyms
- Protolechia mesopsamma Turner, 1919

Species of moth

Ardozyga mesopsamma is a species of moth in the family Gelechiidae. It was described by Alfred Jefferis Turner in 1919. It is found in Australia, where it has been recorded from Queensland.

The wingspan is about 13 mm (0.51 in). The forewings are dark fuscous with slight whitish irroration and whitish-brown markings. There is a broad costal streak from the base to one-third and a fine short sub-basal dorsal streak, as well as a series of fine dots on the apical third of the costa and termen. The hindwings are pale-grey.
