= Ardozyga megalosticta =

Scientific classification
- Kingdom: Animalia
- Phylum: Arthropoda
- Clade: Pancrustacea
- Class: Insecta
- Order: Lepidoptera
- Family: Gelechiidae
- Genus: Ardozyga
- Species: A. megalosticta

Binomial name
- Ardozyga megalosticta (Turner, 1919)

Synonyms
- Protolechia megalosticta Turner, 1919

Species of moth

Ardozyga megalosticta is a species of moth in the family Gelechiidae. It was described by Alfred Jefferis Turner in 1919. It is found in Australia, where it has been recorded from New South Wales.

The wingspan is 13–14 mm (0.51–0.55 in). The forewings are pale-grey with dark-fuscous markings. There is a dot near the base of the costa and another on the costa at one-sixth, a dot near the base of the dorsum and another on the dorsum at one-fourth. The first discal is found at one-third, it is minute, while the second discal is larger at two-thirds, the plical beyond the first discal and large. There is a large fuscous suffusion beyond the second discal extending to the tornus and there is also a terminal fuscous suffusion. The hindwings are grey-whitish.
