= Ardozyga stratifera =

Scientific classification
- Kingdom: Animalia
- Phylum: Arthropoda
- Clade: Pancrustacea
- Class: Insecta
- Order: Lepidoptera
- Family: Gelechiidae
- Genus: Ardozyga
- Species: A. stratifera

Binomial name
- Ardozyga stratifera (Meyrick, 1904)

Synonyms
- Protolechia stratifera Meyrick, 1904; Gelechia stratifera Lower, 1894

Species of moth

Ardozyga stratifera, the striped ardozyga moth, is a species of moth in the family Gelechiidae. It was described by Edward Meyrick in 1904. It is found in Australia, where it has been recorded from Queensland, New South Wales, Victoria, Tasmania, South Australia and Western Australia.

The wingspan is 11–13 mm (0.43–0.51 in). The forewings are whitish ochreous, partially tinged with pale brassy yellow and with a moderate dark fuscous costal streak from near the base to five-sixths, narrowed to the extremities, the lower edge with three blackish marks. There is a broad dark fuscous streak along the dorsum and termen to the apex, the upper edge irregularly sinuate, forming four slight prominences, and partially blackish marked. The hindwings are rather light grey, darker posteriorly.
