= Ardozyga crypsibatis =

Scientific classification
- Kingdom: Animalia
- Phylum: Arthropoda
- Clade: Pancrustacea
- Class: Insecta
- Order: Lepidoptera
- Family: Gelechiidae
- Genus: Ardozyga
- Species: A. crypsibatis

Binomial name
- Ardozyga crypsibatis (Meyrick, 1904)

Synonyms
- Protolechia crypsibatis Meyrick, 1904

Species of moth

Ardozyga crypsibatis is a species of moth in the family Gelechiidae. It was described by Edward Meyrick in 1904. It is found in Australia, where it has been recorded from Tasmania, New South Wales and South Australia.

The wingspan is 12–14 mm (0.47–0.55 in). The forewings are light fuscous irrorated (speckled) with whitish scales pointed with dark fuscous. The stigmata are round, dark fuscous, the plical rather obliquely beyond the first discal, another similar dot below the second discal. There is a dark fuscous marginal line above the apex. The hindwings are pale grey.
