= Ardozyga flexilis =

Scientific classification
- Kingdom: Animalia
- Phylum: Arthropoda
- Clade: Pancrustacea
- Class: Insecta
- Order: Lepidoptera
- Family: Gelechiidae
- Genus: Ardozyga
- Species: A. flexilis

Binomial name
- Ardozyga flexilis (Meyrick, 1904)

Synonyms
- Protolechia flexilis Meyrick, 1904

Species of moth

Ardozyga flexilis is a species of moth in the family Gelechiidae. It was described by Edward Meyrick in 1904. It is found in Australia, where it has been recorded from New South Wales.

The wingspan is about 12 mm (0.47 in). The forewings are fuscous, irrorated (speckled) with dark fuscous and finely sprinkled with whitish. The stigmata are dark fuscous, the plical obliquely beyond the first discal and another similar dot beneath the second discal. The hindwings are pale grey.
