= Ardozyga ceramica =

Scientific classification
- Kingdom: Animalia
- Phylum: Arthropoda
- Clade: Pancrustacea
- Class: Insecta
- Order: Lepidoptera
- Family: Gelechiidae
- Genus: Ardozyga
- Species: A. ceramica

Binomial name
- Ardozyga ceramica (Meyrick, 1904)

Synonyms
- Protolechia ceramica Meyrick, 1904; Gelechia ceramica Lower, 1897

Species of moth

Ardozyga ceramica is a species of moth in the family Gelechiidae. It was described by Edward Meyrick in 1904. It is found in Australia, where it has been recorded from New South Wales.

The wingspan is 13–14 mm (0.51–0.55 in). The forewings are pale rosy-ochreous irrorated (speckled) with ferruginous and with the veins partially obscurely indicated with fuscous and whitish irroration. The markings are undefined, formed of brown-reddish suffusion more or less irrorated or marked with black. There are three small oblique semi-oval spots on the anterior half of the costa and a series of short marks along the fold, as well as two longitudinal marks in the disc representing the stigmata. There is also a series of spots beneath the posterior half of the costa and along the termen. The hindwings are pale grey, becoming darker posteriorly.
