= Ardozyga diplanetis =

Scientific classification
- Kingdom: Animalia
- Phylum: Arthropoda
- Clade: Pancrustacea
- Class: Insecta
- Order: Lepidoptera
- Family: Gelechiidae
- Genus: Ardozyga
- Species: A. diplanetis

Binomial name
- Ardozyga diplanetis (Meyrick, 1904)

Synonyms
- Protolechia diplanetis Meyrick, 1904

Species of moth

Ardozyga diplanetis is a species of moth in the family Gelechiidae. It was described by Edward Meyrick in 1904. It is found in Australia, where it has been recorded from New South Wales and Victoria.

The wingspan is 17–19 mm (0.67–0.75 in). The forewings are dark slaty-fuscous, with more or less distinct blackish streaks along the fold and in the disc posteriorly. The stigmata are minute, white, with the plical obliquely beyond the first discal. There is a rounded yellow-ochreous spot between the second discal and the tornus, edged anteriorly with ochreous-whitish and there is also a white dot on the middle of the costa, as well as a series beneath the costa posteriorly. The hindwings are fuscous, darker posteriorly, more thinly scaled towards the base.
