= Ardozyga banausodes =

Scientific classification
- Kingdom: Animalia
- Phylum: Arthropoda
- Clade: Pancrustacea
- Class: Insecta
- Order: Lepidoptera
- Family: Gelechiidae
- Genus: Ardozyga
- Species: A. banausodes

Binomial name
- Ardozyga banausodes (Meyrick, 1904)

Synonyms
- Protolechia banausodes Meyrick, 1904

Species of moth

Ardozyga banausodes is a species of moth in the family Gelechiidae. It was described by Edward Meyrick in 1904. It is found in Australia, where it has been recorded from Queensland.

The wingspan is about 15 mm (0.59 in). The forewings are light fuscous, sprinkled with dark fuscous with the stigmata cloudy, dark fuscous, the plical beneath the first discal, an additional dot beneath and sometimes sub-confluent with the second discal. There is a series of indistinct dark fuscous dots along the posterior part of the costa and termen. The hindwings are grey.
