= Ardozyga odorifera =

Scientific classification
- Kingdom: Animalia
- Phylum: Arthropoda
- Clade: Pancrustacea
- Class: Insecta
- Order: Lepidoptera
- Family: Gelechiidae
- Genus: Ardozyga
- Species: A. odorifera

Binomial name
- Ardozyga odorifera (Meyrick, 1904)

Synonyms
- Protolechia odorifera Meyrick, 1904

Species of moth

Ardozyga odorifera is a species of moth in the family Gelechiidae. It was described by Edward Meyrick in 1904. It is found in Australia, where it has been recorded from New South Wales and Queensland.

The wingspan is 14–17 mm (0.55–0.67 in). The forewings are grey, irrorated with dark fuscous and a few whitish scales and with a moderate pale ferruginous costal streak from the base to two-fifths, enclosing dark fuscous oblique wedge-shaped costal spots at the base and one-fourth, and terminated by a larger dark fuscous spot in the middle. The stigmata are whitish, the discal placed on a longitudinal black streak, the plical obliquely before the first discal, placed on a fine black plical streak usually marked with pale ferruginous dots at one-fourth and near the tornus. There is an irregularly triangular pale ferruginous spot above the tornus, preceded by some whitish scales, and followed by a blackish apical suffusion. Some undefined blackish spots are found beneath the costa posteriorly, edged beneath with pale ferruginous. The hindwings are light grey, darker terminally, thinly scaled towards the costa from the base to two-thirds.
