= Ardozyga exarista =

Scientific classification
- Kingdom: Animalia
- Phylum: Arthropoda
- Clade: Pancrustacea
- Class: Insecta
- Order: Lepidoptera
- Family: Gelechiidae
- Genus: Ardozyga
- Species: A. exarista

Binomial name
- Ardozyga exarista (Meyrick, 1904)

Synonyms
- Protolechia exarista Meyrick, 1904

Species of moth

Ardozyga exarista is a species of moth in the family Gelechiidae. It was described by Edward Meyrick in 1904. It is found in Australia, where it has been recorded from the state of Western Australia.

The wingspan is about 12 mm (0.47 in). The forewings are dark fuscous, faintly purplish-tinged with a yellowish-white costal blotch near the base, reaching three-fourths across the wing, the posterior edge outwardly oblique. There are darker longitudinal marks in the disc above the middle and on the fold. The posterior half has scattered undefined dots of white scales, especially indicating a postmedian fascia and terminal series. The costal edge is yellowish-white for a short distance beyond the middle. The hindwings are tawny.
