= Ardozyga hedana =

Scientific classification
- Kingdom: Animalia
- Phylum: Arthropoda
- Clade: Pancrustacea
- Class: Insecta
- Order: Lepidoptera
- Family: Gelechiidae
- Genus: Ardozyga
- Species: A. hedana

Binomial name
- Ardozyga hedana (Turner, 1919)

Synonyms
- Protolechia hedana Turner, 1919

Species of moth

Ardozyga hedana is a species of moth in the family Gelechiidae. It was described by Alfred Jefferis Turner in 1919. It is found in Australia, where it has been recorded from southern Queensland.

The wingspan is about 18 mm (0.71 in). The forewings are whitish closely irrorated with purple-grey, the markings reddish-brown mixed with fuscous. There are three ill-defined fuscous spots on the basal third of the costa, the surrounding area suffused with reddish brown. A subdorsal spot is found at three-fourths, a discal spot slightly beyond it at two-thirds, and two terminal spots above and below the middle. The hindwings are whitish, becoming pale-grey towards the apex.
