= Ardozyga celidophora =

Scientific classification
- Kingdom: Animalia
- Phylum: Arthropoda
- Clade: Pancrustacea
- Class: Insecta
- Order: Lepidoptera
- Family: Gelechiidae
- Genus: Ardozyga
- Species: A. celidophora

Binomial name
- Ardozyga celidophora (Turner, 1919)

Synonyms
- Protolechia celidophora Turner, 1919

Species of moth

Ardozyga celidophora is a species of moth in the family Gelechiidae. It was described by Alfred Jefferis Turner in 1919. It is found in Australia, where it has been recorded from Queensland.

The wingspan is 12–17 mm (0.47–0.67 in). The forewings are pale-brown, with the markings and a few scattered scales fuscous. There is an outlined blotch, ill-defined dorsally, including the plical and first discal, a dot above the middle second discal at two-thirds and a large tornal and terminal blotch which is narrower at the apex. There are also some whitish-brown terminal dots. The hindwings are whitish-ochreous with the apical one-third grey.
