= Ardozyga aspetodes =

Scientific classification
- Kingdom: Animalia
- Phylum: Arthropoda
- Clade: Pancrustacea
- Class: Insecta
- Order: Lepidoptera
- Family: Gelechiidae
- Genus: Ardozyga
- Species: A. aspetodes

Binomial name
- Ardozyga aspetodes (Meyrick, 1904)

Synonyms
- Protolechia aspetodes Meyrick, 1904

Species of moth

Ardozyga aspetodes is a species of moth in the family Gelechiidae. It was described by Edward Meyrick in 1904. It is found in Australia where it has been recorded from Victoria.

The wingspan is about 21 mm (0.83 in). The forewings are dark brown-grey with the stigmata dark fuscous, each followed by a minute pale dot, the plical obliquely beyond the first discal, the second discal transverse. There is a series of pale dots along the posterior part of the costa and termen. The hindwings are fuscous with a terminal series of pale dots.
