= Ardozyga proscripta =

Scientific classification
- Kingdom: Animalia
- Phylum: Arthropoda
- Clade: Pancrustacea
- Class: Insecta
- Order: Lepidoptera
- Family: Gelechiidae
- Genus: Ardozyga
- Species: A. proscripta

Binomial name
- Ardozyga proscripta (Meyrick, 1921)

Synonyms
- Protolechia proscripta Meyrick, 1921

Species of moth

Ardozyga proscripta is a species of moth in the family Gelechiidae. It was described by Edward Meyrick in 1921. It is found in Australia, where it has been recorded from southern Queensland.

The wingspan is about 13 mm (0.51 in). The forewings are light brownish-ochreous, with coarse scattered blackish scales and blackish markings. There is a large dot on the base of the costa, a small spot at one-fifth, a somewhat larger spot before the middle, and three dots posteriorly. There is a small spot on the dorsum at one-fourth and the plical and first discal stigmata form large roundish sub-confluent spots, the plical posterior, the second discal forming a small round spot, an additional similar spot before and slightly above this, and an indistinct dot beneath it. There is also an almost terminal series of large cloudy dots. The hindwings are light grey, somewhat darker posteriorly.
