= Ardozyga galactopa =

Scientific classification
- Kingdom: Animalia
- Phylum: Arthropoda
- Clade: Pancrustacea
- Class: Insecta
- Order: Lepidoptera
- Family: Gelechiidae
- Genus: Ardozyga
- Species: A. galactopa

Binomial name
- Ardozyga galactopa (Meyrick, 1916)

Synonyms
- Lexiarcha galactopa Meyrick, 1916; Protolechia albifrons Turner, 1919; Protolechia blacica Turner, 1919

Species of moth

Ardozyga galactopa is a species of moth in the family Gelechiidae. It was described by Edward Meyrick in 1916. It is found in Australia, where it has been recorded from the Northern Territory and Queensland.

The wingspan is about 11 mm (0.43 in). The forewings are dark fuscous, faintly purplish-tinged and with the base narrowly ochreous-white. There is a broad irregular-edged whitish-ochreous transverse fascia at about three-fourths. The hindwings are grey, thinly scaled towards the base and with a thin subdorsal expansible hairpencil of very long fine pale grey hairs.
