= Ardozyga diplonesa =

Scientific classification
- Kingdom: Animalia
- Phylum: Arthropoda
- Clade: Pancrustacea
- Class: Insecta
- Order: Lepidoptera
- Family: Gelechiidae
- Genus: Ardozyga
- Species: A. diplonesa

Binomial name
- Ardozyga diplonesa (Meyrick, 1904)

Synonyms
- Protolechia diplonesa Meyrick, 1904

Species of moth

Ardozyga diplonesa is a species of moth in the family Gelechiidae. It was described by Edward Meyrick in 1904. It is found in Australia, where it has been recorded from Western Australia.

The wingspan is 8–9 mm (0.31–0.35 in). The forewings are grey densely mixed with white, the costa broadly suffused with white from near the base to near the apex. The discal stigmata are large, roundish, dark fuscous, the plical little marked or obsolete, somewhat obliquely beyond the first discal. The hindwings are pale grey, becoming darker posteriorly.
