= Ardozyga xuthias =

Scientific classification
- Kingdom: Animalia
- Phylum: Arthropoda
- Clade: Pancrustacea
- Class: Insecta
- Order: Lepidoptera
- Family: Gelechiidae
- Genus: Ardozyga
- Species: A. xuthias

Binomial name
- Ardozyga xuthias (Meyrick, 1904)

Synonyms
- Protolechia xuthias Meyrick, 1904

Species of moth

Ardozyga xuthias is a species of moth in the family Gelechiidae. It was described by Edward Meyrick in 1904. It is found in Australia, where it has been recorded from South Australia.

The wingspan is about 15 mm (0.59 in). The forewings are ferruginous, becoming fuscous towards the anterior half of the dorsum. There is a fuscous streak along the fold, and a fuscous erect mark from the tornus, reaching two-thirds across the wing. The costal edge is blackish, with oblique blackish wedge-shaped marks at the base, one-fifth, and before and beyond the middle. There are some black scales in a longitudinal row above the middle. The stigmata are blackish and undefined, the plical obliquely beyond the first discal. There is also an angulated series of black dots beneath the posterior third of the costa and along the termen. The hindwings are grey.
