= Ardozyga tetraploa =

Scientific classification
- Kingdom: Animalia
- Phylum: Arthropoda
- Clade: Pancrustacea
- Class: Insecta
- Order: Lepidoptera
- Family: Gelechiidae
- Genus: Ardozyga
- Species: A. tetraploa

Binomial name
- Ardozyga tetraploa (Meyrick, 1904)

Synonyms
- Protolechia tetraploa Meyrick, 1904

Species of moth

Ardozyga tetraploa is a species of moth in the family Gelechiidae. It was described by Edward Meyrick in 1904. It is found in Australia, where it has been recorded from Victoria.

The wingspan is about 15 mm (0.59 in). The forewings are dark fuscous with a very broad ochreous-white transverse fascia extending from near the base to one-third and with an ochreous-white costal dot beyond the middle, as well as a rather narrow ochreous-white inwards-curved fascia from two-thirds of the costa to before the tornus. The hindwings are grey, darker towards apex.
