= Ardozyga telopis =

Scientific classification
- Kingdom: Animalia
- Phylum: Arthropoda
- Clade: Pancrustacea
- Class: Insecta
- Order: Lepidoptera
- Family: Gelechiidae
- Genus: Ardozyga
- Species: A. telopis

Binomial name
- Ardozyga telopis (Meyrick, 1904)

Synonyms
- Protolechia telopis Meyrick, 1904

Species of moth

Ardozyga telopis is a species of moth in the family Gelechiidae. It was described by Edward Meyrick in 1904. It is found in Australia, where it has been recorded from New South Wales.

The wingspan is about 13 mm (0.51 in). The forewings are dark brown, on the termen purplish-tinged. There is a large ochreous-white patch extending along the costa from the base (except a dark fuscous basal dot) to two-fifths, reaching about three-fourths across the wing and at the base to the dorsum, the lower edge sinuate, indented posteriorly, the posterior edge outwardly oblique from the costa, somewhat curved. There is an ochreous-whitish triangular dot on the middle of the costa and a moderate ochreous-white fascia from three-fourths of the costa towards the tornus, but not quite reaching it, narrowed downwards. The hindwings are tawny, posteriorly infuscated.
