= Ardozyga cephalota =

Scientific classification
- Kingdom: Animalia
- Phylum: Arthropoda
- Clade: Pancrustacea
- Class: Insecta
- Order: Lepidoptera
- Family: Gelechiidae
- Genus: Ardozyga
- Species: A. cephalota

Binomial name
- Ardozyga cephalota (Meyrick, 1904)

Synonyms
- Protolechia cephalota Meyrick, 1904

Species of moth

Ardozyga cephalota is a species of moth in the family Gelechiidae. It was described by Edward Meyrick in 1904. It is found in Australia, where it has been recorded from Western Australia.

The wingspan is about 18 mm (0.71 in). The forewings are fuscous irrorated with dark fuscous and with the stigmata obscure, elongate, dark fuscous, each followed by a whitish-ochreous dot, the plical obliquely beyond the first discal. There is a whitish-ochreous dot on the dorsum at one-fourth, and one in the middle of the costa. There is also a small undefined spot of whitish-ochreous suffusion above the tornus, preceded by dark fuscous suffusion, and a fainter spot above this. Some indistinct whitish-ochreous dots are found beneath the costa posteriorly and along the termen. The hindwings are grey, paler, and thinly scaled towards the base.
