= Ardozyga tetralychna =

Scientific classification
- Kingdom: Animalia
- Phylum: Arthropoda
- Clade: Pancrustacea
- Class: Insecta
- Order: Lepidoptera
- Family: Gelechiidae
- Genus: Ardozyga
- Species: A. tetralychna

Binomial name
- Ardozyga tetralychna Lower, 1902

Synonyms
- Protolechia acricula Meyrick, 1914

Species of moth

Ardozyga tetralychna is a species of moth in the family Gelechiidae. It was described by Oswald Bertram Lower in 1902. It is found in Australia, where it has been recorded from Victoria and New South Wales.

The wingspan is about 17 mm (0.67 in). The forewings are dark fuscous, with a slight purplish tinge and a small yellow-ochreous spot at the base in the middle. The stigmata are small, white, the plical obliquely beyond the first discal. There is a row of small white dots around the posterior part of the costa and termen. The hindwings are grey.
