= Ardozyga cosmotis =

Scientific classification
- Kingdom: Animalia
- Phylum: Arthropoda
- Clade: Pancrustacea
- Class: Insecta
- Order: Lepidoptera
- Family: Gelechiidae
- Genus: Ardozyga
- Species: A. cosmotis

Binomial name
- Ardozyga cosmotis (Meyrick, 1904)

Synonyms
- Protolechia cosmotis Meyrick, 1904

Species of moth

Ardozyga cosmotis is a species of moth in the family Gelechiidae. It was described by Edward Meyrick in 1904. It is found in Australia, where it has been recorded from Western Australia.

The wingspan is 13–15 mm (0.51–0.59 in). The forewings are grey or greyish-ochreous, irregularly mixed with white and sprinkled with black and with a small ochreous-orange basal patch. The stigmata are moderate, blackish, more or less accompanied with white, the plical very obliquely beyond the first discal, and with a similar dot between and above the first and second discal, the second discal followed by a white spot containing two black specks. The posterior half of the costa is marked with alternate dark and whitish spots. The hindwings are grey or whitish-grey.
