= Ardozyga trichroma =

Scientific classification
- Kingdom: Animalia
- Phylum: Arthropoda
- Clade: Pancrustacea
- Class: Insecta
- Order: Lepidoptera
- Family: Gelechiidae
- Genus: Ardozyga
- Species: A. trichroma

Binomial name
- Ardozyga trichroma (Turner, 1933)

Synonyms
- Protolechia trichroma Turner, 1933

Species of moth

Ardozyga trichroma is a species of moth in the family Gelechiidae. It was described by Alfred Jefferis Turner in 1933. It is found in Australia, where it has been recorded from Queensland.

The wingspan is about 15 mm (0.59 in).
