= Ardozyga loxodesma =

Scientific classification
- Kingdom: Animalia
- Phylum: Arthropoda
- Clade: Pancrustacea
- Class: Insecta
- Order: Lepidoptera
- Family: Gelechiidae
- Genus: Ardozyga
- Species: A. loxodesma

Binomial name
- Ardozyga loxodesma (Meyrick, 1904)

Synonyms
- Prodosiarcha loxodesma Meyrick, 1904

Species of moth

Ardozyga loxodesma is a species of moth in the family Gelechiidae. It was described by Edward Meyrick in 1904. It is found in Australia, where it has been recorded from South Australia.

The wingspan is 11–14 mm (0.43–0.55 in). The forewings are rather dark fuscous, finely irrorated (speckled) with whitish and with a spot on the costa at one-fourth, a straight oblique fascia from before the middle of the costa to before the tornus, and an angulated subterminal series of spots very close to the posterior portion of the costa and termen dark fuscous, undefined and often indistinct. The hindwings are orange, the posterior half suffused with dark fuscous.
