= Ardozyga aversella =

Scientific classification
- Kingdom: Animalia
- Phylum: Arthropoda
- Clade: Pancrustacea
- Class: Insecta
- Order: Lepidoptera
- Family: Gelechiidae
- Genus: Ardozyga
- Species: A. aversella

Binomial name
- Ardozyga aversella (Walker, 1864)

Synonyms
- Gelechia aversella Walker, 1864; Protolechia aversella

Species of moth

Ardozyga aversella is a species of moth in the family Gelechiidae. It was described by Francis Walker in 1864. It is found in Australia, where it has been recorded from the states of Western Australia, Queensland, New South Wales, Victoria and South Australia.

The wingspan is 12–16 mm. The forewings are fuscous, irregularly sprinkled with white and dark fuscous, the costal half much more mixed with white. There are small blackish spots on the base of the costa and dorsum and two very oblique parallel series of ill-defined blackish marks from the costa at one-fourth and before the middle to the termen, and a third, more connected, along the fold. Sometimes, there are some indistinct ochreous or reddish-ochreous marks placed amongst these, especially towards the termen. The hindwings are light grey, darker posteriorly.
