= Ardozyga aeolopis =

Scientific classification
- Kingdom: Animalia
- Phylum: Arthropoda
- Clade: Pancrustacea
- Class: Insecta
- Order: Lepidoptera
- Family: Gelechiidae
- Genus: Ardozyga
- Species: A. aeolopis

Binomial name
- Ardozyga aeolopis (Meyrick, 1904)

Synonyms
- Protolechia aeolopis Meyrick, 1904

Species of moth

Ardozyga aeolopis is a species of moth in the family Gelechiidae. It was described by Edward Meyrick in 1904. It is found in Australia, where it has been recorded from New South Wales.

The wingspan is about 10 mm (0.39 in). The forewings are pale greyish-ochreous, irrorated with dark fuscous and with five costal spots of blackish irroration (speckles) from the base to beyond three-fourths and three clear discal patches of whitish suffusion surrounded with pale ochreous at one-third, two-thirds, and four-fifths, the first and second followed by blackish spots on the fold, the second and third connected in the disc by an elongate blackish mark. There is a blackish dorsal mark towards the base and an irregular streak of blackish suffusion along the termen. The hindwings are dark fuscous, with an irregular transparent patch towards the base.
