= Ardozyga tridecta =

Scientific classification
- Kingdom: Animalia
- Phylum: Arthropoda
- Clade: Pancrustacea
- Class: Insecta
- Order: Lepidoptera
- Family: Gelechiidae
- Genus: Ardozyga
- Species: A. tridecta

Binomial name
- Ardozyga tridecta (Lower, 1900)

Synonyms
- Gelechia tridecta Lower, 1900; Protolechia tridecta

Species of moth

Ardozyga tridecta is a species of moth in the family Gelechiidae. It was described by Oswald Bertram Lower in 1900. It is found in Australia, where it has been recorded from South Australia.

The wingspan is about 18 mm (0.71 in). The forewings are fuscous whitish, irregularly sprinkled with fuscous and with a fuscous basal patch, the edge curved, dark fuscous, running from the costa near the base to the dorsum at one-fourth. There are five small dark fuscous spots on the costa and two triangular brown spots in the disc at one-third and two-thirds, representing the stigmata, blackish edged except beneath, the anterior rather larger. There is also an undefined fuscous suffusion towards the apex and upper part of the termen. The hindwings are grey.
