= Ardozyga sporodeta =

Scientific classification
- Kingdom: Animalia
- Phylum: Arthropoda
- Clade: Pancrustacea
- Class: Insecta
- Order: Lepidoptera
- Family: Gelechiidae
- Genus: Ardozyga
- Species: A. sporodeta

Binomial name
- Ardozyga sporodeta (Turner, 1919)

Synonyms
- Protolechia sporodeta Turner, 1919

Species of moth

Ardozyga sporodeta is a species of moth in the family Gelechiidae. It was described by Alfred Jefferis Turner in 1919. It is found in Australia, where it has been recorded from Queensland.

The wingspan is about 14 mm (0.55 in). The forewings are ochreous-whitish with numerous dots and a few scattered dark-fuscous scales. There are subcostal and subdorsal dots near the base and a subdorsal dot at one-sixth. The stigmata are larger and rather suffused, the plical beyond the first discal, the second discal before two-thirds. There is a series of dots on the apical half of the costa and near the termen. The hindwings are whitish with pale-grey suffusion towards the apex.
