= Ardozyga dysphanes =

Scientific classification
- Kingdom: Animalia
- Phylum: Arthropoda
- Clade: Pancrustacea
- Class: Insecta
- Order: Lepidoptera
- Family: Gelechiidae
- Genus: Ardozyga
- Species: A. dysphanes

Binomial name
- Ardozyga dysphanes (Turner, 1947)

Synonyms
- Eutorna dysphanes Turner, 1947

Species of moth

Ardozyga dysphanes is a species of moth in the family Gelechiidae. It was described by Alfred Jefferis Turner in 1947. It is found in Australia, where it has been recorded from Queensland.
