= Ardozyga chiradia =

Scientific classification
- Kingdom: Animalia
- Phylum: Arthropoda
- Clade: Pancrustacea
- Class: Insecta
- Order: Lepidoptera
- Family: Gelechiidae
- Genus: Ardozyga
- Species: A. chiradia

Binomial name
- Ardozyga chiradia (Meyrick, 1904)

Synonyms
- Protolechia chiradia Meyrick, 1904

Species of moth

Ardozyga chiradia is a species of moth in the family Gelechiidae. It was described by Edward Meyrick in 1904. It is found in Australia, where it has been recorded from Queensland.

The wingspan is 11–13 mm (0.43–0.51 in). The forewings are fuscous-whitish, irregularly irrorated with dark fuscous and sometimes partially ochreous-tinged. The stigmata are blackish, more or less accompanied with white suffusion, variable in development, sometimes large, the plical obliquely beyond the first discal, an additional dot between and above the first and second discal, and another beneath the second discal. There is an oblique spot of dark fuscous suffusion from the base of the costa, and usually blotches before and beyond the middle. Some undefined dark spots are found towards the costa posteriorly and the termen. The hindwings are yellow-grey-whitish, suffused with light grey towards the apex.
