= Ardozyga psephias =

Scientific classification
- Kingdom: Animalia
- Phylum: Arthropoda
- Clade: Pancrustacea
- Class: Insecta
- Order: Lepidoptera
- Family: Gelechiidae
- Genus: Ardozyga
- Species: A. psephias

Binomial name
- Ardozyga psephias (Meyrick, 1904)

Synonyms
- Protolechia psephias Meyrick, 1904

Species of moth

Ardozyga psephias is a species of moth in the family Gelechiidae. It was described by Edward Meyrick in 1904. It is found in Australia, where it has been recorded from Western Australia.

The wingspan is 12–14 mm (0.47–0.55 in). The forewings are pale fuscous, irrorated with whitish and sprinkled with dark fuscous. The stigmata are large, dark fuscous and undefined, with the plical obliquely beyond the first discal, sometimes additional dots between and above the discal, and beneath the second discal. The posterior half of the costa is marked with more or less defined white dots alternating with darker spots. The hindwings are light grey, paler towards the base.
