= Ardozyga pelogramma =

Scientific classification
- Kingdom: Animalia
- Phylum: Arthropoda
- Clade: Pancrustacea
- Class: Insecta
- Order: Lepidoptera
- Family: Gelechiidae
- Genus: Ardozyga
- Species: A. pelogramma

Binomial name
- Ardozyga pelogramma (Meyrick, 1904)

Synonyms
- Protolechia pelogramma Meyrick, 1904; Protolechia phloeopola Turner, 1919

Species of moth naive to Victoria, Australia

Ardozyga pelogramma is a species of moth in the family Gelechiidae. It was first described by Edward Meyrick in 1904. It is found in Australia, where it has been recorded in Victoria.

It has a wingspan of 16–19 mm (0.63–0.75 in). The forewings are whitish-gray densely covered in small dark gray-brown spots and with a moderate irregular pale reddish-ochreous longitudinal streak above the middle from the base to near the apex, irregularly streaked with white, the upper edge ill-defined, with three anteriorly oblique wedge-shaped projections almost reaching the costal edge on the anterior half, the lower edge well-defined, at first straight, then with two semi-oval indentations representing the large discal stigmata, and an irregular indentation between them. There is an elongate whitish dot on the fold about the middle, and a short pale ochreous dash towards the tornus. The hindwings are grey, darker posteriorly, near the base paler and thinly scaled.
