= Ardozyga annularia =

Scientific classification
- Kingdom: Animalia
- Phylum: Arthropoda
- Clade: Pancrustacea
- Class: Insecta
- Order: Lepidoptera
- Family: Gelechiidae
- Genus: Ardozyga
- Species: A. annularia

Binomial name
- Ardozyga annularia (Turner, 1919)

Synonyms
- Protolechia annularia Turner, 1919

Species of moth

Ardozyga annularia is a species of moth in the family Gelechiidae. It was described by Alfred Jefferis Turner in 1919. It is found in Australia, where it has been recorded from southern Queensland.
