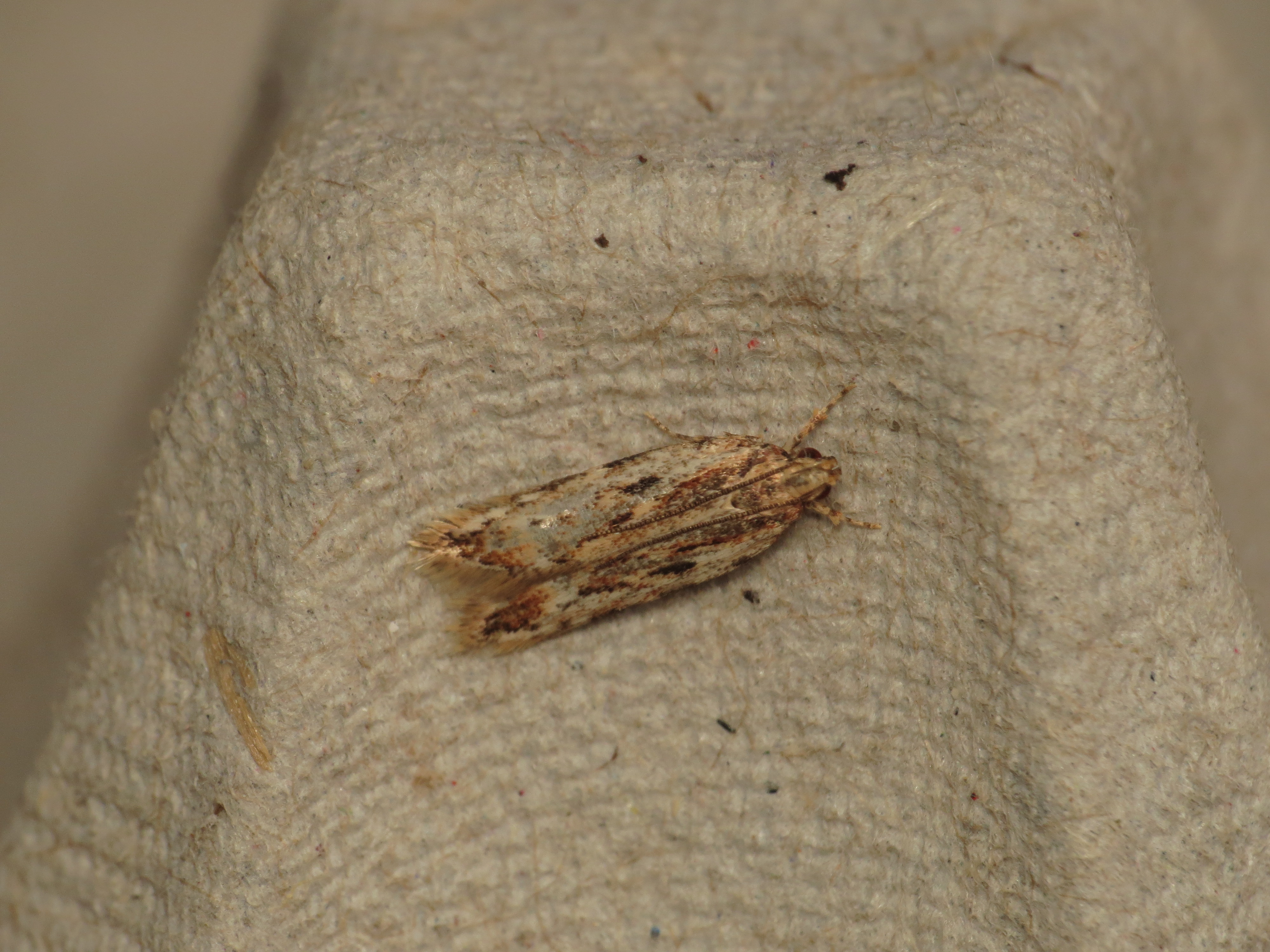

Scientific classification
- Kingdom: Animalia
- Phylum: Arthropoda
- Clade: Pancrustacea
- Class: Insecta
- Order: Lepidoptera
- Family: Gelechiidae
- Genus: Ardozyga
- Species: A. sisyraea

Binomial name
- Ardozyga sisyraea (Meyrick, 1904)

Synonyms
- Protolechia sisyraea Meyrick, 1904

= Ardozyga sisyraea =

Species of moth

Ardozyga sisyraea is a species of moth in the family Gelechiidae. It was described by Edward Meyrick in 1904. It is found in Australia, where it has been recorded from Victoria.

The wingspan is about 14 mm (0.55 in). The forewings are ochreous-whitish, irregularly sprinkled with fuscous and light ferruginous and with five elongate marks of dark fuscous irroration on the costa, and one on the base of the dorsum. The stigmata are blackish, with the plical very obliquely beyond the first discal, preceded and followed by some blackish scales on the fold, the second discal followed by a short blackish dash, connected with an upright blackish mark from the tornus, a line of blackish marks from the costa beyond the middle to the apex. There is a moderately broad light ferruginous patch along the termen. The hindwings are fuscous-whitish, becoming more fuscous posteriorly. The basal two-fifths, except for a narrow median hyaline patch, are clothed with modified blackish-grey scales, with acute projections on the veins reaching to the middle.
