= Ardozyga hypoleuca =

Scientific classification
- Kingdom: Animalia
- Phylum: Arthropoda
- Clade: Pancrustacea
- Class: Insecta
- Order: Lepidoptera
- Family: Gelechiidae
- Genus: Ardozyga
- Species: A. hypoleuca

Binomial name
- Ardozyga hypoleuca (Meyrick, 1904)

Synonyms
- Protolechia hypoleuca Meyrick, 1904

Species of moth

Ardozyga hypoleuca is a species of moth in the family Gelechiidae. It was described by Edward Meyrick in 1904. It is found in Australia, where it has been recorded from New South Wales.

The wingspan is 11–12 mm (0.43–0.47 in). The forewings are light grey, mixed with whitish and sprinkled with dark fuscous. The stigmata are large, formed of dark fuscous irroration, with the plical obliquely beyond the first discal. The dark fuscous irroration tends to form similar spots on the fold before and beyond the plical, between the discal stigmata, and along the posterior half of the costa and termen. The hindwings are whitish.
