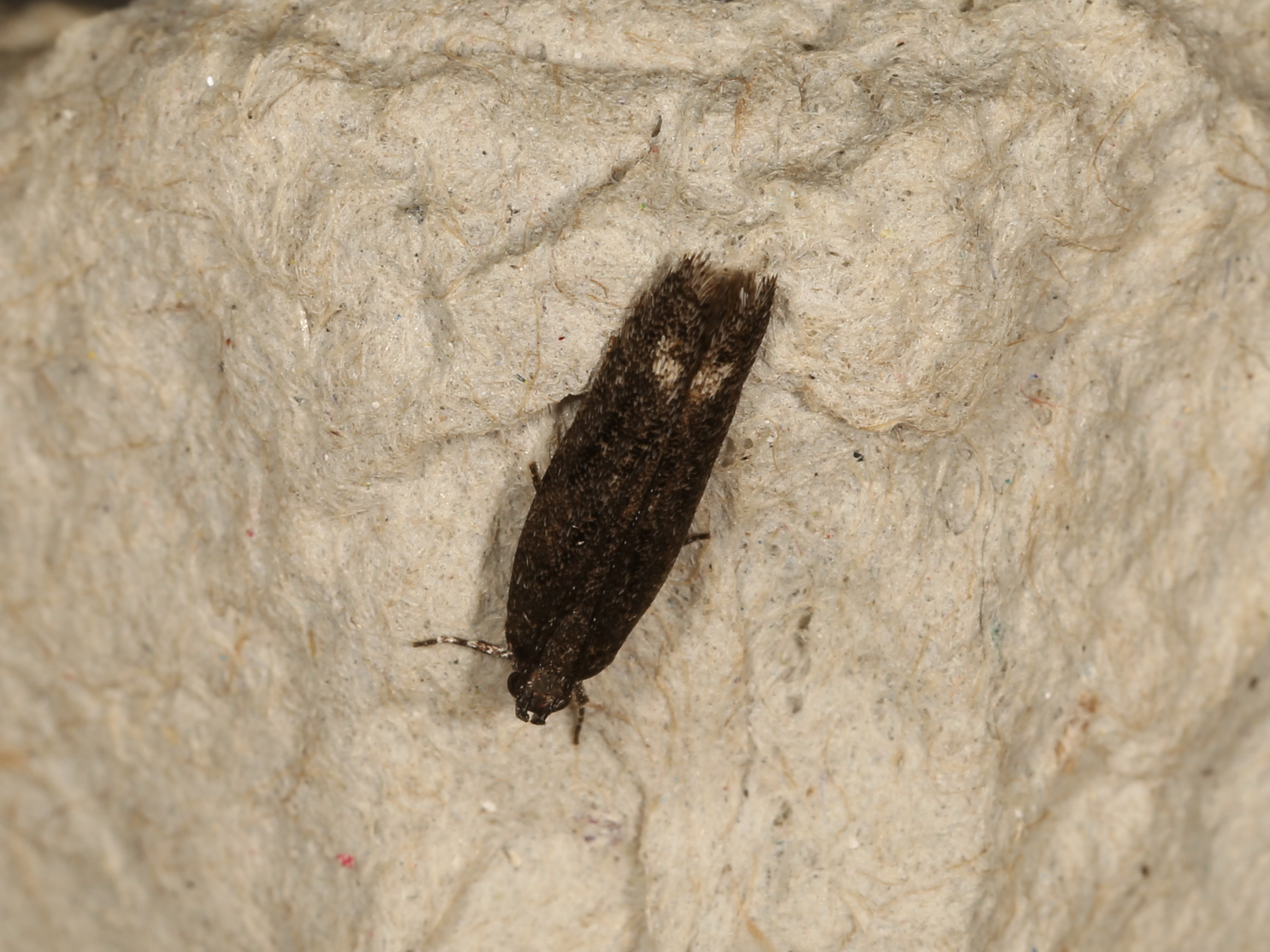

Scientific classification
- Kingdom: Animalia
- Phylum: Arthropoda
- Clade: Pancrustacea
- Class: Insecta
- Order: Lepidoptera
- Family: Gelechiidae
- Genus: Ardozyga
- Species: A. hilara

Binomial name
- Ardozyga hilara (Turner, 1919)

Synonyms
- Protolechia hilara Turner, 1919

= Ardozyga hilara =

Species of moth

Ardozyga hilara is a species of moth in the family Gelechiidae. It was described by Alfred Jefferis Turner in 1919. It is found in Australia, where it has been recorded from Victoria.

The wingspan is about 16 mm (0.63 in). The forewings are dark-fuscous with a few scattered whitish scales. The stigmata are blackish, scarcely discernible and there is a whitish suffused spot above the tornus. The hindwings are orange with some fuscous scales on the apex and termen.
