= Ardozyga xestolitha =

Scientific classification
- Kingdom: Animalia
- Phylum: Arthropoda
- Clade: Pancrustacea
- Class: Insecta
- Order: Lepidoptera
- Family: Gelechiidae
- Genus: Ardozyga
- Species: A. xestolitha

Binomial name
- Ardozyga xestolitha (Meyrick, 1904)

Synonyms
- Protolechia xestolitha Meyrick, 1904

Species of moth

Ardozyga xestolitha is a species of moth in the family Gelechiidae. It was described by Edward Meyrick in 1904. It is found in Australia, where it has been recorded from New South Wales.

The wingspan is about 19 mm (0.75 in). The forewings are shining light bronzy-fuscous, suffused with brownish-ochreous towards the base, somewhat sprinkled with dark fuscous. The stigmata are small, dark fuscous, rather nearly approximated, the plical rather obliquely beyond the first discal, a similar dot nearly midway between the second discal and the dorsum. The hindwings are light grey, towards the base whitish-tinged.
