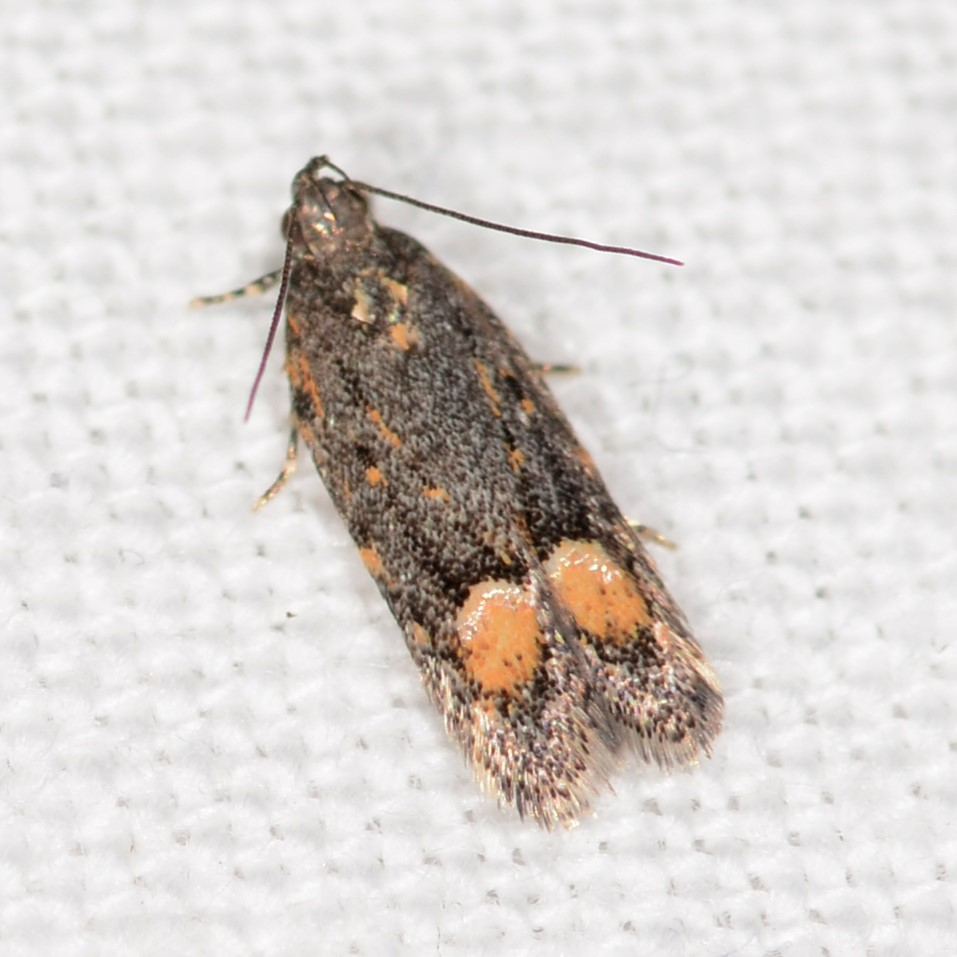

Scientific classification
- Kingdom: Animalia
- Phylum: Arthropoda
- Clade: Pancrustacea
- Class: Insecta
- Order: Lepidoptera
- Family: Gelechiidae
- Genus: Ardozyga
- Species: A. deltodes

Binomial name
- Ardozyga deltodes (Lower, 1896)

Synonyms
- Gelechia deltodes Lower, 1896; Protolechia deltodes

= Ardozyga deltodes =

Species of moth

Ardozyga deltodes is a species of moth in the family Gelechiidae. It was first described by Oswald Bertram Lower in 1896. It is found in Australia, where it has been recorded from Victoria and New South Wales.

== Description ==
The wingspan is 15–19 mm (0.59–0.75 in). The forewings are pale ashy grey, densely irrorated (speckled) with dark fuscous, with bronzy-purplish reflections. In males, there is a small ochreous-white basal spot, while there is a pale ochreous basal dot in females. There are ochreous-white dots on the costa near the base, and at one-fourth of the dorsum, more ochreous in females. The stigmata are blackish fuscous, the plical obliquely beyond the first discal, both these followed by ochreous-whitish dots. There is also an ochreous-whitish dot on the middle of the costa and an ochreous-yellow blotch from the tornus reaching nearly across wing, the anterior edge convex and margined with an ochreous-white streak separated by some metallic scales, the posterior edge straight. An angulated series of ochreous-whitish dots is found beneath the posterior portion of the costa and along the termen. The hindwings are grey.
