= Ardozyga creperrima =

Scientific classification
- Kingdom: Animalia
- Phylum: Arthropoda
- Clade: Pancrustacea
- Class: Insecta
- Order: Lepidoptera
- Family: Gelechiidae
- Genus: Ardozyga
- Species: A. creperrima

Binomial name
- Ardozyga creperrima (Turner, 1919)

Synonyms
- Protolechia creperrima Turner, 1919

Species of moth

Ardozyga creperrima is a species of moth in the family Gelechiidae. It was described by Alfred Jefferis Turner in 1919. It is found in Australia, where it has been recorded from southern Queensland. The wingspan is about 14 mm (0.55 in). The forewings are dark-fuscous, with the stigmata obsolete. The hindwings are grey.
