= Ardozyga cladara =

Scientific classification
- Kingdom: Animalia
- Phylum: Arthropoda
- Clade: Pancrustacea
- Class: Insecta
- Order: Lepidoptera
- Family: Gelechiidae
- Genus: Ardozyga
- Species: A. cladara

Binomial name
- Ardozyga cladara (Meyrick, 1904)

Synonyms
- Protolechia cladara Meyrick, 1904

Species of moth

Ardozyga cladara is a species of moth in the family Gelechiidae. It was described by Edward Meyrick in 1904. It is found in Australia, where it has been recorded from Tasmania.

The wingspan is about 11 mm (0.43 in). The forewings are fuscous, finely irrorated with white, more strongly and suffusedly towards the costa, and with the costal edge quite white. The stigmata are indistinctly dark fuscous, the plical obliquely beyond the first discal, another similar dot beneath the second discal. The hindwings are grey-whitish.
