= Ardozyga idiospila =

Scientific classification
- Kingdom: Animalia
- Phylum: Arthropoda
- Clade: Pancrustacea
- Class: Insecta
- Order: Lepidoptera
- Family: Gelechiidae
- Genus: Ardozyga
- Species: A. idiospila

Binomial name
- Ardozyga idiospila (Meyrick, 1922)

Synonyms
- Semocharista idiospila Meyrick, 1922

Species of moth

Ardozyga idiospila is a species of moth in the family Gelechiidae. It was described by Edward Meyrick in 1922. It is found in Australia, where it has been recorded from north-western Australia.

The wingspan is about 12 mm (0.47 in). The forewings are dark fuscous, the dorsal half suffused brown from one-fourth to the termen. There is a small white spot near the base in the middle, nearly confluent with an elongate white spot beneath the fold towards the base. There are also two large irregular transverse white blotches in the disc at one-third and two-thirds, each enclosing a small irregular dark fuscous spot in its lower portion, the second rather constricted in the middle. There are small irregular marginal whitish dots around the posterior part of the costa and termen. The hindwings are pale grey.
