= Ardozyga phloeodes =

Scientific classification
- Kingdom: Animalia
- Phylum: Arthropoda
- Clade: Pancrustacea
- Class: Insecta
- Order: Lepidoptera
- Family: Gelechiidae
- Genus: Ardozyga
- Species: A. phloeodes

Binomial name
- Ardozyga phloeodes (Meyrick, 1904)

Synonyms
- Protolechia phloeodes Meyrick, 1904; Cryptolechia striata Turner, 1947

Species of moth

Ardozyga phloeodes is a species of moth in the family Gelechiidae. It was described by Edward Meyrick in 1904. It is found in Australia, where it has been recorded from Queensland.

The wingspan is 19–21 mm (0.75–0.83 in). The forewings are white or whitish-fuscous mixed with white, irrorated with dark fuscous, and with all veins irregularly streaked with blackish-fuscous. The second discal stigma is dark fuscous surrounded with white. The hindwings are fuscous, darker posteriorly, especially in females, towards the base thinly scaled and whitish.
