= Ardozyga compsochroa =

Scientific classification
- Kingdom: Animalia
- Phylum: Arthropoda
- Clade: Pancrustacea
- Class: Insecta
- Order: Lepidoptera
- Family: Gelechiidae
- Genus: Ardozyga
- Species: A. compsochroa

Binomial name
- Ardozyga compsochroa (Meyrick, 1904)

Synonyms
- Protolechia compsochroa Meyrick, 1904

Species of moth

Ardozyga compsochroa is a species of moth in the family Gelechiidae. It was described by Edward Meyrick in 1904. It is found in Australia, where it has been recorded from South Australia and New South Wales.

The wingspan is 12–13 mm (0.47–0.51 in). The forewings are fuscous, sprinkled with dark fuscous and a few white scales, as well as with a broad reddish-ochreous streak along the costa from the base to three-fourths, the lower edge irregular and partially margined with white scales. There is a streak of blackish irroration beneath this from two-fifths to the extremity, with a short whitish-edged projection upwards halfway, and marked with a white dot representing the second discal stigma. There is also a streak of blackish irroration along the fold, marked with two or three white dots. A series of white dots alternating with black scales are found along the posterior half of the costa and the veins towards the termen tend to be lined with dark fuscous, with numerous scattered white scales. The hindwings are light grey.
