= Ardozyga autopis =

Scientific classification
- Kingdom: Animalia
- Phylum: Arthropoda
- Clade: Pancrustacea
- Class: Insecta
- Order: Lepidoptera
- Family: Gelechiidae
- Genus: Ardozyga
- Species: A. autopis

Binomial name
- Ardozyga autopis (Meyrick, 1904)

Synonyms
- Protolechia autopis Meyrick, 1904

Species of moth

Ardozyga autopis is a species of moth in the family Gelechiidae. It was described by Edward Meyrick in 1904. It is found in Australia, where it has been recorded from the state of Western Australia.

The wingspan is 14–15 mm (0.55–0.59 in). The forewings are rather light fuscous, sprinkled with dark fuscous and with the stigmata moderate, dark fuscous, the plical obliquely beyond the first discal. There are traces of darker spots on the posterior half of the costa and termen. The hindwings are light grey.
