= Ardozyga ananeura =

Scientific classification
- Kingdom: Animalia
- Phylum: Arthropoda
- Clade: Pancrustacea
- Class: Insecta
- Order: Lepidoptera
- Family: Gelechiidae
- Genus: Ardozyga
- Species: A. ananeura

Binomial name
- Ardozyga ananeura (Meyrick, 1904)

Synonyms
- Protolechia ananeura Meyrick, 1904; Protolechia mitophora Turner, 1919

Species of moth

Ardozyga ananeura is a species of moth in the family Gelechiidae. It was described by Edward Meyrick in 1904. It is found in Australia, where it has been recorded from Queensland and New South Wales.

The wingspan is about 11 mm (0.43 in). The forewings are light ochreous, sprinkled on the veins with fuscous and blackish. There is a small distinct black dot beneath the costa near the base. The stigmata are small, blackish, with the plical very obliquely beyond the first discal, an additional dot between and above the first and second discal, and another beneath the second discal. There are three triangular blackish marks on the upper part of the termen, the middle one largest. The hindwings are light grey.
