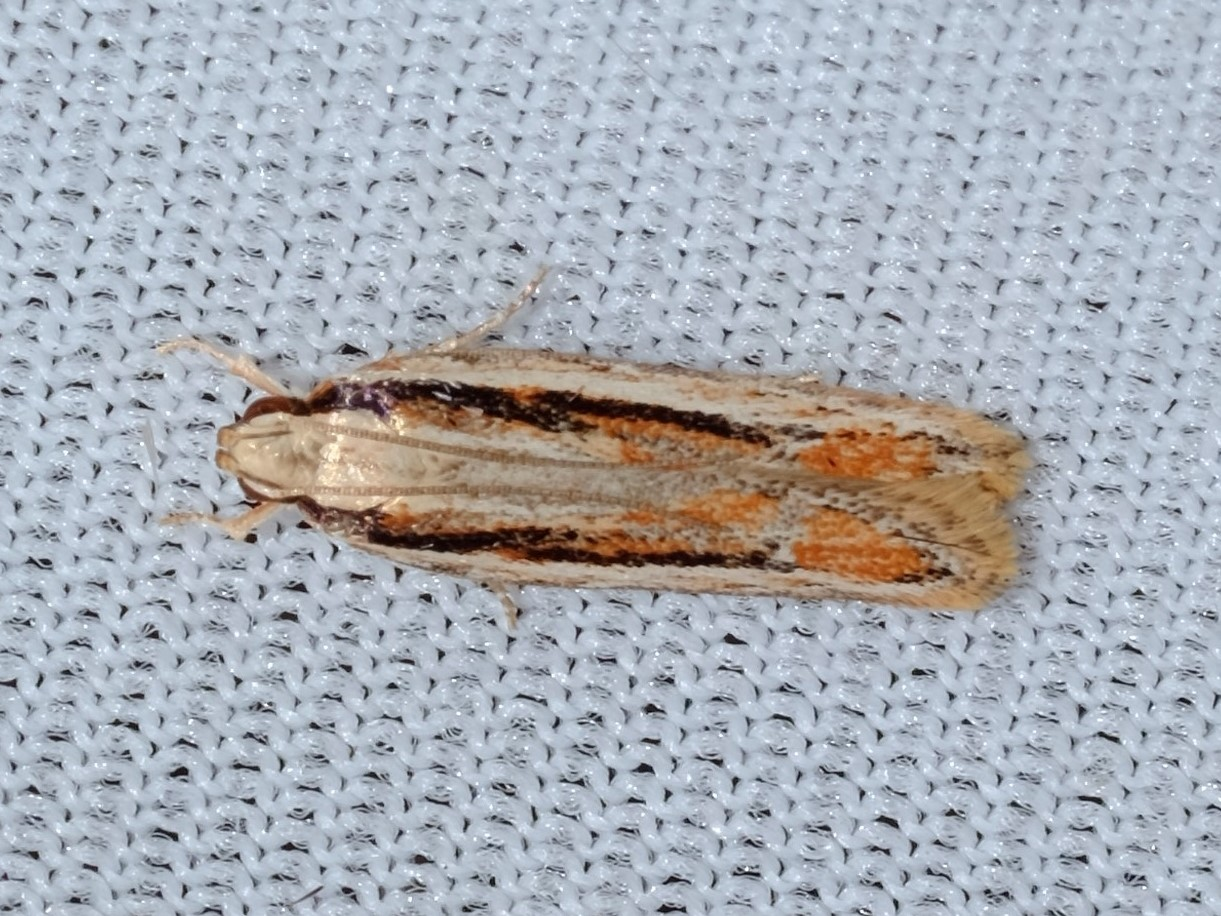

Scientific classification
- Kingdom: Animalia
- Phylum: Arthropoda
- Clade: Pancrustacea
- Class: Insecta
- Order: Lepidoptera
- Family: Gelechiidae
- Genus: Ardozyga
- Species: A. orthanotos

Binomial name
- Ardozyga orthanotos (Lower, 1900)

Synonyms
- Gelechia orthanotos Lower, 1900; Protolechia orthanotos

= Ardozyga orthanotos =

Species of moth

Ardozyga orthanotos is a species of moth in the family Gelechiidae. It was described by Oswald Bertram Lower in 1900. It is found in Australia, where it has been recorded from Victoria.

The wingspan is about 18 mm (0.71 in). The forewings are whitish ochreous, partly mixed with pale ochreous, with some scattered fuscous and dark fuscous scales. There are indications of dark fuscous marks on the costa at one-fifth and two-fifths and there is a somewhat undefined black streak along the fold from the base to two-fifths, and another in the disc from above the apex of this to three-fourths. There are also some blackish scales about the apex. The hindwings are dark fuscous, somewhat lighter towards the tips, towards the dorsum ochreous tinged and with a short transparent streak from the middle of the base.
