= Ardozyga bistrigata =

Scientific classification
- Kingdom: Animalia
- Phylum: Arthropoda
- Clade: Pancrustacea
- Class: Insecta
- Order: Lepidoptera
- Family: Gelechiidae
- Genus: Ardozyga
- Species: A. bistrigata

Binomial name
- Ardozyga bistrigata (Meyrick, 1921)

Synonyms
- Protolechia bistrigata Meyrick, 1921

Species of moth

Ardozyga bistrigata is a species of moth in the family Gelechiidae. It was described by Edward Meyrick in 1921. It is found in Australia, where it has been recorded from southern Queensland.

The wingspan is about 10 mm (0.39 in). The forewings are pale ochreous largely suffused light brown-reddish and with a line of dark grey scales almost on the costa towards the base. There is a small group of black scales just below the costa before the middle, and two others similarly placed midway between this and the apex. A black streak is found along the basal half of the fold, and an irregular thicker streak in the disc from before the middle to five-sixths. There are also three or four strigulae of irregular black scales along the termen and at the apex, as well as a white marginal line around the posterior part of the costa and termen. The hindwings are subhyaline whitish with suffused grey streaks along the veins, and a broad terminal band of grey suffusion.
