= Ardozyga elpistis =

Scientific classification
- Kingdom: Animalia
- Phylum: Arthropoda
- Clade: Pancrustacea
- Class: Insecta
- Order: Lepidoptera
- Family: Gelechiidae
- Genus: Ardozyga
- Species: A. elpistis

Binomial name
- Ardozyga elpistis (Meyrick, 1904)

Synonyms
- Protolechia elpistis Meyrick, 1904

Species of moth

Ardozyga elpistis is a species of moth in the family Gelechiidae. It was described by Edward Meyrick in 1904. It is found in Australia, where it has been recorded from Western Australia.

The wingspan is about 15 mm (0.59 in). The forewings are fuscous, sprinkled with whitish and dark fuscous. The stigmata are rather indistinct, dark fuscous, the plical obliquely beyond the first discal. The hindwings are light grey.
