= Ardozyga trichalina =

Scientific classification
- Kingdom: Animalia
- Phylum: Arthropoda
- Clade: Pancrustacea
- Class: Insecta
- Order: Lepidoptera
- Family: Gelechiidae
- Genus: Ardozyga
- Species: A. trichalina

Binomial name
- Ardozyga trichalina (Meyrick, 1904)

Synonyms
- Protolechia trichalina Meyrick, 1904

Species of moth

Ardozyga trichalina is a species of moth in the family Gelechiidae. It was described by Edward Meyrick in 1904. It is found in Australia, where it has been recorded from Western Australia.

The wingspan is 17–18 mm (0.67–0.71 in). The forewings are white, with a few scattered grey or dark fuscous scales and a narrow curved subbasal dark fuscous fascia, interrupted below the middle. There are dark fuscous dots on the costa at one-fifth and before and beyond the middle, and on the dorsum at one-fourth, a dark fuscous transverse discal spot at two-fifths, and a smaller and narrower one at two-thirds, representing the stigmata, the anterior connected with an elongate fuscous suffusion along the dorsum. There is a moderate somewhat sinuate dark fuscous fascia at three-fourths and an irregular dark fuscous apical blotch, enclosing some whitish terminal dots. The hindwings are grey, paler basally.
