= Ardozyga catadamanta =

Scientific classification
- Kingdom: Animalia
- Phylum: Arthropoda
- Clade: Pancrustacea
- Class: Insecta
- Order: Lepidoptera
- Family: Gelechiidae
- Genus: Ardozyga
- Species: A. catadamanta

Binomial name
- Ardozyga catadamanta (Diakonoff, 1954)

Synonyms
- Prodosiarcha catadamanta Diakonoff, 1954

Species of moth

Ardozyga catadamanta is a species of moth in the family Gelechiidae. It was described by Alexey Diakonoff in 1954. It is found in New Guinea.
