= Ardozyga plinthactis =

Scientific classification
- Kingdom: Animalia
- Phylum: Arthropoda
- Clade: Pancrustacea
- Class: Insecta
- Order: Lepidoptera
- Family: Gelechiidae
- Genus: Ardozyga
- Species: A. plinthactis

Binomial name
- Ardozyga plinthactis (Meyrick, 1904)

Synonyms
- Protolechia plinthactis Meyrick, 1904

Species of moth

Ardozyga plinthactis is a species of moth that belongs to the family Gelechiidae. This species can be found in Australia, where it has been recorded from New South Wales.

It was described by Edward Meyrick in 1904.

== Description ==
The wingspan is about 10 mm (0.39 in). The forewings are white, sprinkled with pale ochreous and dark fuscous. The markings are pale ochreous mixed or tinged with ferruginous and irrorated with blackish. There is a small spot at the base of the costa, and another at one-fifth, as well as a larger and more blackish oblique semi-oval spot on the costa before the middle and a mark on the base of the dorsum. A small spot is found on the fold at one-third and there is an irregular patch above the tornus, as well as a row of undefined spots beneath the posterior third of the costa and along the termen. The hindwings are pale grey.
