= Ardozyga amphiplaca =

Scientific classification
- Kingdom: Animalia
- Phylum: Arthropoda
- Clade: Pancrustacea
- Class: Insecta
- Order: Lepidoptera
- Family: Gelechiidae
- Genus: Ardozyga
- Species: A. amphiplaca

Binomial name
- Ardozyga amphiplaca (Meyrick, 1932)

Synonyms
- Protolechia amphiplaca Meyrick, 1932

Species of moth

Ardozyga amphiplaca is a species of moth in the family Gelechiidae. It was described by Edward Meyrick in 1932. It is found in New Guinea.
