= Ardozyga nothrodes =

Scientific classification
- Kingdom: Animalia
- Phylum: Arthropoda
- Clade: Pancrustacea
- Class: Insecta
- Order: Lepidoptera
- Family: Gelechiidae
- Genus: Ardozyga
- Species: A. nothrodes

Binomial name
- Ardozyga nothrodes (Meyrick, 1921)

Synonyms
- Protolechia nothrodes Meyrick, 1921

Species of moth

Ardozyga nothrodes is a species of moth in the family Gelechiidae. It was described by Edward Meyrick in 1921. It is found in Australia, where it has been recorded from southern Queensland.

The wingspan is 13–15 mm (0.51–0.59 in). The forewings are brown, more or less irrorated dark fuscous. The stigmata are dark fuscous, usually obscure or indistinct, the plical rather obliquely beyond the first discal, an additional dot beneath the second discal, and one between the first and second. There are cloudy dark fuscous dots along the posterior half of the costa, the interspaces usually lighter brownish-ochreous, and an interrupted terminal line similarly edged. The hindwings are pale whitish-yellowish, more or less suffused with light grey on the posterior half.
