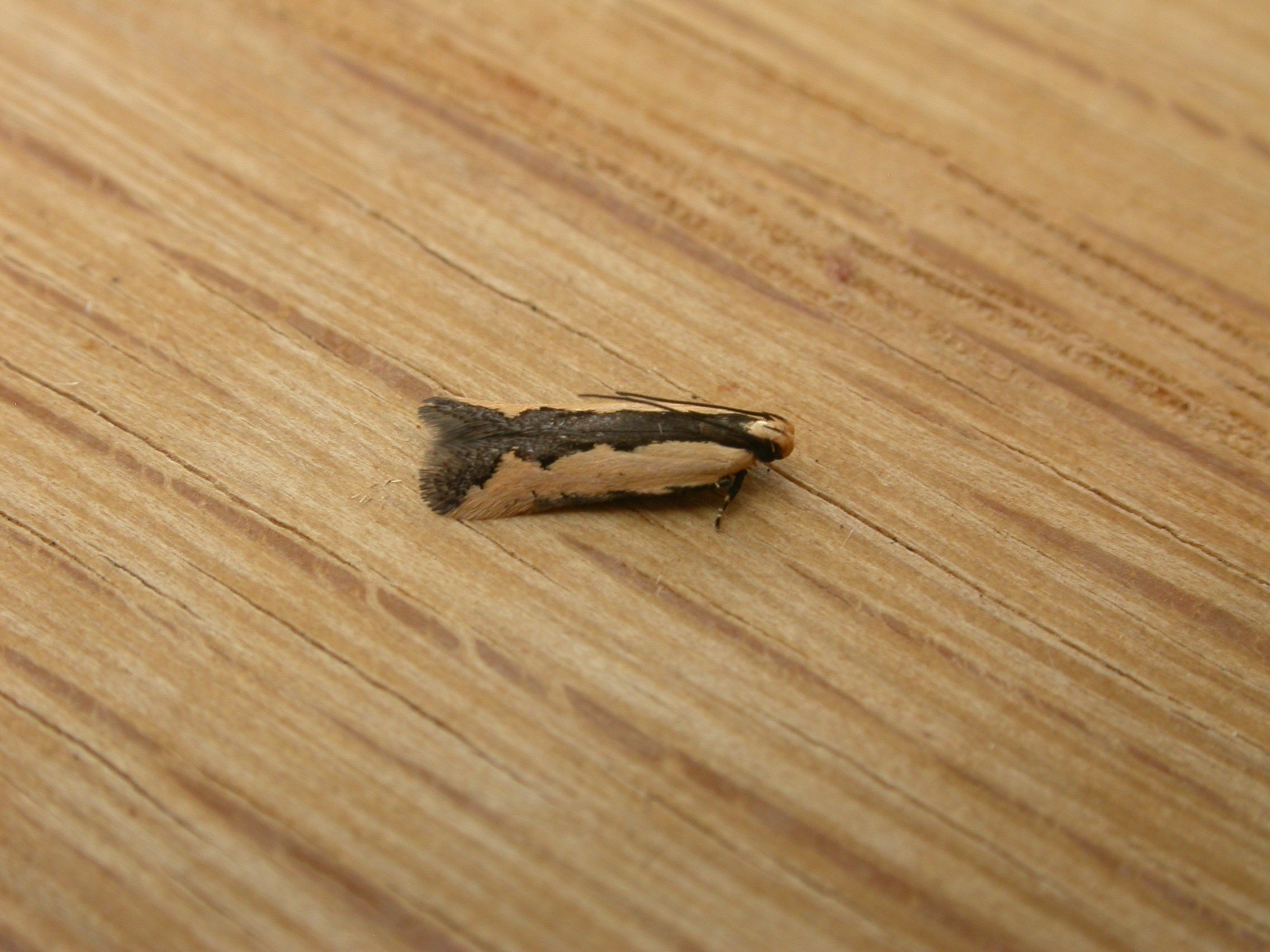

Scientific classification
- Kingdom: Animalia
- Phylum: Arthropoda
- Clade: Pancrustacea
- Class: Insecta
- Order: Lepidoptera
- Family: Gelechiidae
- Genus: Ardozyga
- Species: A. catarrhacta

Binomial name
- Ardozyga catarrhacta (Meyrick, 1904)

Synonyms
- Protolechia catarrhacta Meyrick, 1904

= Ardozyga catarrhacta =

Species of moth

Ardozyga catarrhacta is a species of moth in the family Gelechiidae. It was described by Edward Meyrick in 1904. It is found in Australia, where it has been recorded from New South Wales.

The wingspan is about 9 mm (0.35 in). The forewings are shining whitish-ochreous with five oblique dark fuscous marks or spots on the costa, the basal minute, the others larger posteriorly, last two confluent. There is a broad dark fuscous dorsal streak from the base to the tornus, with the extremities pointed and the upper edge projecting at one-fourth and more strongly at two-thirds. There is also a dark fuscous spot along the termen beneath the apex. The hindwings are whitish-grey.
