= Ardozyga anthracina =

Scientific classification
- Kingdom: Animalia
- Phylum: Arthropoda
- Clade: Pancrustacea
- Class: Insecta
- Order: Lepidoptera
- Family: Gelechiidae
- Genus: Ardozyga
- Species: A. anthracina

Binomial name
- Ardozyga anthracina (Meyrick, 1904)

Synonyms
- Protolechia anthracina Meyrick, 1904

Species of moth

Ardozyga anthracina is a species of moth in the family Gelechiidae. It was described by Edward Meyrick in 1904. It is found in Australia, where it has been recorded from New South Wales.

The wingspan is 11–13 mm (0.43–0.51 in). The forewings are fuscous suffusedly irrorated (speckled) with dark fuscous, sometimes with a few whitish scales. The plical and second discal stigmata are obsoletely dark fuscous, each accompanied by a distinct white dot. The hindwings are grey, thinly scaled and semitransparent towards the base, darker posteriorly.
