= Ardozyga secta =

Scientific classification
- Kingdom: Animalia
- Phylum: Arthropoda
- Clade: Pancrustacea
- Class: Insecta
- Order: Lepidoptera
- Family: Gelechiidae
- Genus: Ardozyga
- Species: A. secta

Binomial name
- Ardozyga secta (Meyrick, 1921)

Synonyms
- Protolechia secta Meyrick, 1921

Species of moth

Ardozyga secta is a species of moth in the family Gelechiidae. It was described by Edward Meyrick in 1921. It is found in Australia, where it has been recorded from southern Queensland.

The wingspan is about 15 mm (0.59 in). The forewings are pale ochreous irrorated dark fuscous, with some irregular ferruginous-ochreous suffusion towards the base, on the fold, and beneath the costa. The discal stigmata are represented by elongate blackish streaks, the plical similar but shorter, rather beyond the first discal. There is a blackish mark on the fold towards the extremity and an angulated series of cloudy blackish marks just before the posterior part of the costa and termen, preceded by cloudy ferruginous-ochreous spots. The hindwings are grey, pale towards the base.
