= Ardozyga caminopis =

Scientific classification
- Kingdom: Animalia
- Phylum: Arthropoda
- Clade: Pancrustacea
- Class: Insecta
- Order: Lepidoptera
- Family: Gelechiidae
- Genus: Ardozyga
- Species: A. caminopis

Binomial name
- Ardozyga caminopis (Meyrick, 1904)

Synonyms
- Protolechia caminopis Meyrick, 1904

Species of moth

Ardozyga caminopis is a species of moth in the family Gelechiidae. It was described by Edward Meyrick in 1904. It is found in Australia, where it has been recorded from New South Wales.

The wingspan is about 12 mm (0.47 in). The forewings are dark bronzy, irrorated with blackish. The costal edge is ochreous-whitish just beyond the middle and there is an irregular-edged elongate whitish-ochreous spot extending along the dorsum from two-fifths to three-fourths. The hindwings are tawny, deeper towards the apex.
