= Ardozyga subnexella =

Scientific classification
- Kingdom: Animalia
- Phylum: Arthropoda
- Clade: Pancrustacea
- Class: Insecta
- Order: Lepidoptera
- Family: Gelechiidae
- Genus: Ardozyga
- Species: A. subnexella

Binomial name
- Ardozyga subnexella (Walker, 1864)

Synonyms
- Gelechia subnexella Walker, 1864; Protolechia subnexella; Gelechia bistellella Walker, 1864; Gelechia monoleuca Lower, 1897

Species of moth

Ardozyga subnexella is a species of moth in the family Gelechiidae. It was described by Francis Walker in 1864. It is found in Australia, where it has been recorded from Queensland and New South Wales.

The wingspan is 16–17 mm. The forewings are purplish fuscous irregularly irrorated (sprinkled) with dark fuscous or blackish and with a streak of blackish suffusion along the fold. There is a suffused black streak in the disc from before the middle to near the termen, interrupted by a rather large white second discal stigma. The hindwings are fuscous, darker posteriorly, thinly scaled towards the base.
