= Ardozyga irobela =

Scientific classification
- Kingdom: Animalia
- Phylum: Arthropoda
- Clade: Pancrustacea
- Class: Insecta
- Order: Lepidoptera
- Family: Gelechiidae
- Genus: Ardozyga
- Species: A. irobela

Binomial name
- Ardozyga irobela (Turner, 1947)

Synonyms
- Cryptolechia irobela Turner, 1947; Cryptolechia brachymita Turner, 1947

Species of moth

Ardozyga irobela is a species of moth in the family Gelechiidae. It was described by Alfred Jefferis Turner in 1947. It is found in Australia, where it has been recorded from Western Australia.
