= Ardozyga prisca =

Scientific classification
- Kingdom: Animalia
- Phylum: Arthropoda
- Clade: Pancrustacea
- Class: Insecta
- Order: Lepidoptera
- Family: Gelechiidae
- Genus: Ardozyga
- Species: A. prisca

Binomial name
- Ardozyga prisca (Meyrick, 1904)

Synonyms
- Protolechia prisca Meyrick, 1904

Species of moth

Ardozyga prisca is a species of moth in the family Gelechiidae. It was described by Edward Meyrick in 1904. It is found in Australia, where it has been recorded from New South Wales.

The wingspan is 8–11 mm (0.31–0.43 in). The forewings are fuscous, very finely irrorated with whitish. The stigmata are faintly darker or quite obsolete, with the plical rather beyond the first discal. The hindwings are pale grey, somewhat darker posteriorly.
