= Ardozyga chionoprora =

Scientific classification
- Kingdom: Animalia
- Phylum: Arthropoda
- Clade: Pancrustacea
- Class: Insecta
- Order: Lepidoptera
- Family: Gelechiidae
- Genus: Ardozyga
- Species: A. chionoprora

Binomial name
- Ardozyga chionoprora (Turner, 1927)

Synonyms
- Protolechia chionoprora Turner, 1927

Species of moth

Ardozyga chionoprora is a species of moth in the family Gelechiidae. It was described by Alfred Jefferis Turner in 1927. It is found in Australia, where it has been recorded from Tasmania.
