= Ardozyga aclera =

Scientific classification
- Kingdom: Animalia
- Phylum: Arthropoda
- Clade: Pancrustacea
- Class: Insecta
- Order: Lepidoptera
- Family: Gelechiidae
- Genus: Ardozyga
- Species: A. aclera

Binomial name
- Ardozyga aclera (Meyrick, 1904)

Synonyms
- Protolechia aclera Meyrick, 1904

Species of moth

Ardozyga aclera is a species of moth in the family Gelechiidae. It was described by Edward Meyrick in 1904. It is found in Australia, where it has been recorded from South Australia.

The wingspan is 11–13 mm (0.43–0.51 in). The forewings are whitish-fuscous, thinly sprinkled with fine blackish scales. The stigmata are blackish, the plical obliquely beyond the first discal, sometimes an additional dot beneath the second discal, and sometimes undefined blackish dots along the posterior half of the costa. The hindwings are grey-whitish.
