= Ardozyga enchotypa =

Scientific classification
- Kingdom: Animalia
- Phylum: Arthropoda
- Clade: Pancrustacea
- Class: Insecta
- Order: Lepidoptera
- Family: Gelechiidae
- Genus: Ardozyga
- Species: A. enchotypa

Binomial name
- Ardozyga enchotypa (Turner, 1919)

Synonyms
- Protolechia enchotypa Turner, 1919

Species of moth

Ardozyga enchotypa is a species of moth in the family Gelechiidae. It was described by Alfred Jefferis Turner in 1919. It is found in Australia, where it has been recorded from Victoria.

The wingspan is about 16 mm (0.63 in). The forewings are fuscous more or less irrorated (sprinkled) with whitish and with a rather broad whitish streak above the middle from the base narrowing to a point at the apex, edged above and beneath by blackish lines, somewhat incomplete and interrupted, and cutting into a streak before the apex, the streak also contains a short blackish longitudinal line near the base and there is a fine blackish line on the fold. The hindwings are pale-grey, darker towards the apex.
