= Ardozyga gypsocrana =

Scientific classification
- Kingdom: Animalia
- Phylum: Arthropoda
- Clade: Pancrustacea
- Class: Insecta
- Order: Lepidoptera
- Family: Gelechiidae
- Genus: Ardozyga
- Species: A. gypsocrana

Binomial name
- Ardozyga gypsocrana (Turner, 1919)

Synonyms
- Protolechia gypsocrana Turner, 1919

Species of moth

Ardozyga gypsocrana is a species of moth in the family Gelechiidae. It was described by Alfred Jefferis Turner in 1919. It is found in Australia, where it has been recorded from Queensland.

The wingspan is 10–12 mm (0.39–0.47 in). The forewings are whitish irrorated with pale-fuscous. The stigmata are rather large, ill-defined, the plical beyond the first discal. The hindwings are whitish.
