= Ardozyga hormodes =

Scientific classification
- Kingdom: Animalia
- Phylum: Arthropoda
- Clade: Pancrustacea
- Class: Insecta
- Order: Lepidoptera
- Family: Gelechiidae
- Genus: Ardozyga
- Species: A. hormodes

Binomial name
- Ardozyga hormodes (Meyrick, 1904)

Synonyms
- Protolechia hormodes Meyrick, 1904

Species of moth

Ardozyga hormodes is a species of moth in the family Gelechiidae. It was described by Edward Meyrick in 1904. It is found in Australia, where it has been recorded from New South Wales.

The wingspan is 13–14 mm (0.51–0.55 in). The forewings are white irregularly sprinkled with ferruginous and fuscous and with blackish markings, more or less accompanied with ferruginous suffusion, especially on the posterior half of the wing. There are three oblique semi-oval spots on the anterior half of the costa and a small spot on the dorsum near the base, as well as three elongate marks along the fold, and two in the disc representing the stigmata. A series of spots is found beneath the posterior portion of the costa and along the termen. The hindwings are pale grey, darker posteriorly.
