= Ardozyga involuta =

Scientific classification
- Kingdom: Animalia
- Phylum: Arthropoda
- Clade: Pancrustacea
- Class: Insecta
- Order: Lepidoptera
- Family: Gelechiidae
- Genus: Ardozyga
- Species: A. involuta

Binomial name
- Ardozyga involuta (Turner, 1919)

Synonyms
- Protolechia involuta Turner, 1919

Species of moth

Ardozyga involuta is a species of moth in the family Gelechiidae. It was described by Turner in 1919. It is found in Australia, where it has been recorded from Queensland.

The wingspan is about 18 mm (0.71 in). The forewings are whitish densely irrorated (speckled) with dark-fuscous. The markings are dark-fuscous edged with whitish. There is a spot on the base of the dorsum, a small median spot at one-fourth, another larger but less defined between this and the middle, a third at three-fourths, and a fourth at the apex, both rather large. There are five costal dots in the posterior two-thirds, as well as a fine subterminal line from the apical spot to the tornus. The hindwings are dark-grey.
