= Ardozyga megalommata =

Scientific classification
- Kingdom: Animalia
- Phylum: Arthropoda
- Clade: Pancrustacea
- Class: Insecta
- Order: Lepidoptera
- Family: Gelechiidae
- Genus: Ardozyga
- Species: A. megalommata

Binomial name
- Ardozyga megalommata (Meyrick, 1904)

Synonyms
- Protolechia megalommata Meyrick, 1904

Species of moth

Ardozyga megalommata is a species of moth in the family Gelechiidae. It was described by Edward Meyrick in 1904. It is found in Australia, where it has been recorded from Queensland.

The wingspan is about 16 mm (0.63 in). The forewings are whitish, suffused with dark bronzy-fuscous irroration except on the veins and the costal edge. There are two transverse-oval dark fuscous blotches in the disc at one-third and two-thirds, outlined with whitish. The hindwings are grey.
