= Ardozyga hypocneca =

Scientific classification
- Kingdom: Animalia
- Phylum: Arthropoda
- Clade: Pancrustacea
- Class: Insecta
- Order: Lepidoptera
- Family: Gelechiidae
- Genus: Ardozyga
- Species: A. hypocneca

Binomial name
- Ardozyga hypocneca (Turner, 1919)

Synonyms
- Protolechia hypocneca Turner, 1919

Species of moth

Ardozyga hypocneca is a species of moth in the family Gelechiidae. It was described by Alfred Jefferis Turner in 1919. It is found in Australia, where it has been recorded from Queensland.

The wingspan is about 11 mm (0.43 in). The forewings are dark-fuscous closely irrorated (speckled) with whitish, more so towards the margins. The stigmata are obsolete. The hindwings are very pale whitish-ochreous with the apical one-third grey.
