= Ardozyga nephelota =

Scientific classification
- Kingdom: Animalia
- Phylum: Arthropoda
- Clade: Pancrustacea
- Class: Insecta
- Order: Lepidoptera
- Family: Gelechiidae
- Genus: Ardozyga
- Species: A. nephelota

Binomial name
- Ardozyga nephelota (Meyrick, 1904)

Synonyms
- Protolechia nephelota Meyrick, 1904

Species of moth

Ardozyga nephelota is a species of moth in the family Gelechiidae. It was described by Edward Meyrick in 1904. It is found in Australia, where it has been recorded from New South Wales and Victoria.

The wingspan is about 16 mm (0.63 in). The forewings are light fuscous irrorated (speckled) with dark fuscous. The stigmata are moderate, dark fuscous, with the plical rather beyond the first discal and a similar dot immediately beneath the second discal. There is a row of obscure pale dots along the posterior half of the costa and termen. The hindwings are grey.
