= Brachyzancla sporima =

Scientific classification
- Kingdom: Animalia
- Phylum: Arthropoda
- Clade: Pancrustacea
- Class: Insecta
- Order: Lepidoptera
- Family: Gelechiidae
- Genus: Ardozyga
- Species: A. sporima

Binomial name
- Ardozyga sporima Turner, 1947

Species of moth

"Brachyzancla" sporima is a species of moth described by Turner in 1947, from a specimen in Queensland, Australia. The wingspan is 15 mm (0.59 in).

== Taxonomy ==
The species was described in the genus Brachyzancla, now considered a synonym of Ardozyga. It is since more often thought to belong to the Xyloryctinae.
