= Ardozyga invalida =

Scientific classification
- Kingdom: Animalia
- Phylum: Arthropoda
- Clade: Pancrustacea
- Class: Insecta
- Order: Lepidoptera
- Family: Gelechiidae
- Genus: Ardozyga
- Species: A. invalida

Binomial name
- Ardozyga invalida (Meyrick, 1904)

Synonyms
- Protolechia invalida Meyrick, 1904

Species of moth

Ardozyga invalida is a species of moth in the family Gelechiidae. It was described by Edward Meyrick in 1904. It is found in Australia, where it has been recorded from southern Queensland and New South Wales.

The wingspan is 8–10 mm (0.31–0.39 in). The forewings are light fuscous, irrorated on the costal third with dark fuscous, and on the dorsal third with whitish. There is a broad white costal streak from the base to near the apex, narrowed posteriorly. The plical stigma and a spot close to the tornus are cloudy and dark fuscous. The hindwings are grey-whitish in males and light grey in females.
