= Ardozyga euryarga =

Scientific classification
- Kingdom: Animalia
- Phylum: Arthropoda
- Clade: Pancrustacea
- Class: Insecta
- Order: Lepidoptera
- Family: Gelechiidae
- Genus: Ardozyga
- Species: A. euryarga

Binomial name
- Ardozyga euryarga (Turner, 1919)

Synonyms
- Protolechia euryarga Turner, 1919

Species of moth

Ardozyga euryarga is a species of moth in the family Gelechiidae. It was described by Alfred Jefferis Turner in 1919. It is found in Australia, where it has been recorded from southern Queensland.

The wingspan is 8–11 mm (0.31–0.43 in). The forewings are fuscous-brown with a broad white costal streak from the base to the apex, narrowing at the extremities, containing some brownish scales towards the costa posteriorly, narrowly edged with fuscous beneath, and slightly indented at one-third and two-thirds, the indentations representing the discal stigmata. There is some white suffusion along the dorsum and tornus. The hindwings are whitish, towards the apex grey-whitish, in females pale-grey.
