= Ardozyga thermoplaca =

Scientific classification
- Kingdom: Animalia
- Phylum: Arthropoda
- Clade: Pancrustacea
- Class: Insecta
- Order: Lepidoptera
- Family: Gelechiidae
- Genus: Ardozyga
- Species: A. thermoplaca

Binomial name
- Ardozyga thermoplaca Lower, 1902

Synonyms
- Protolechia erudita Meyrick, 1916

Species of moth

Ardozyga thermoplaca is a species of moth in the family Gelechiidae. It was described by Oswald Bertram Lower in 1902. It is found in Australia, where it has been recorded from Victoria.

The wingspan is about 17 mm (0.67 in). The forewings are grey irrorated (sprinkled) with dark fuscous and with an irregular transverse ochreous-yellow spot from the costa near the base. The stigmata are represented by small irregular white spots, the plical obliquely beyond the first discal, the second discal larger and partially including two dark dots, surrounded by some scattered whitish scales. There is a row of irregular white dots very near the margin, around the posterior part of the costa and termen. The hindwings are light ochreous yellow, the basal fourth and a broad costal streak becoming obsolete towards the apex dark grey.
