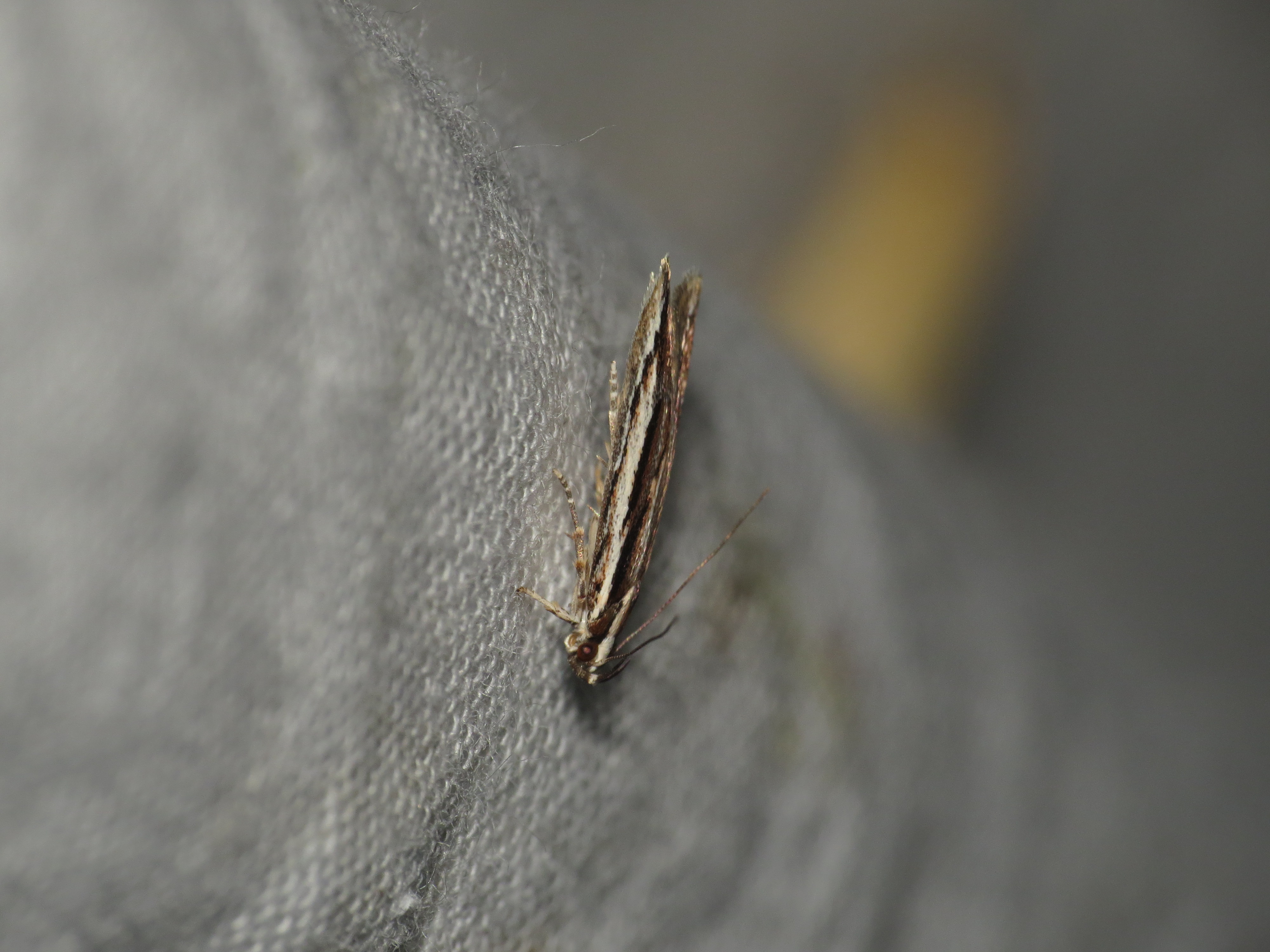

Scientific classification
- Kingdom: Animalia
- Phylum: Arthropoda
- Clade: Pancrustacea
- Class: Insecta
- Order: Lepidoptera
- Family: Gelechiidae
- Genus: Ardozyga
- Species: A. obeliscota

Binomial name
- Ardozyga obeliscota (Meyrick, 1904)

Synonyms
- Protolechia obeliscota Meyrick, 1904; Gelechia obeliscota Lower, 1897

= Ardozyga obeliscota =

Species of moth

Ardozyga obeliscota is a species of moth in the family Gelechiidae. It was described by Edward Meyrick in 1904. It is found in Australia, where it has been recorded from Victoria.

The wingspan is 17–18 mm (0.67–0.71 in). The forewings are light brown, more or less mixed or suffused with ferruginous and the costal two-fifths occupied by a broad white suffusion, the costal edge fuscous mixed. There are three oblique blackish marks on the anterior half of the costa, the third connected by a series of short blackish dashes with the apex. A blackish mark is found on the base of the dorsum and there is a thick blackish streak along the fold from the base, attenuated and becoming obsolete posteriorly. There is a more or less undefined white streak or suffusion beneath this and a thick black longitudinal streak in the disc limiting the white costal suffusion from before one-third to the apical series. Some white scales or suffusion are found beneath this towards the tornus and there is an interrupted blackish terminal line. The hindwings are light grey, darker posteriorly.
