= Ardozyga eumela =

Scientific classification
- Kingdom: Animalia
- Phylum: Arthropoda
- Clade: Pancrustacea
- Class: Insecta
- Order: Lepidoptera
- Family: Gelechiidae
- Genus: Ardozyga
- Species: A. eumela

Binomial name
- Ardozyga eumela (Lower, 1897)

Synonyms
- Cleodora eumela Lower, 1897; Protolechia eumela

Species of moth

Ardozyga eumela is a species of moth in the family Gelechiidae. It was described by Oswald Bertram Lower in 1897. It is found in Australia, where it has been recorded from Tasmania, Victoria and South Australia.

The wingspan is 13–16 mm (0.51–0.63 in). The forewings are whitish fuscous, irregularly sprinkled with fuscous and dark fuscous and with about six small blackish spots on the costa, and one on the dorsum at one-fourth. There is an irregular fuscous blackish-edged blotch in the disc at one-third and a blackish dot above the middle of the disc, as well as a transverse blackish mark in the disc at two-thirds. A series of indistinct dark spots is found before the termen. The hindwings are grey.
