= Ardozyga gorgonias =

Scientific classification
- Kingdom: Animalia
- Phylum: Arthropoda
- Clade: Pancrustacea
- Class: Insecta
- Order: Lepidoptera
- Family: Gelechiidae
- Genus: Ardozyga
- Species: A. gorgonias

Binomial name
- Ardozyga gorgonias (Meyrick, 1904)

Synonyms
- Protolechia gorgonias Meyrick, 1904

Species of moth

Ardozyga gorgonias is a species of moth in the family Gelechiidae. It was described by Edward Meyrick in 1904. It is found in Australia, where it has been recorded from Queensland.

The wingspan is about 12 mm (0.47 in). The forewings are ochreous-whitish, tinged with brown, and irregularly sprinkled with dark fuscous, as well as with a dark fuscous dot on the base of the costa, and some blackish scales between this and the dorsum. There are some raised subdorsal scales at one-fourth and five rather large costal spots of blackish irroration, as well as an irregular dark blotch in the disc at one-third, mostly edged with blackish, and margined posteriorly with white. A blackish white-edged dot is found above the middle of the disc, and two transversely placed at two-thirds. There is a blotch of dark fuscous suffusion in the disc beyond these, confluent with the last costal spot. There is also an apical spot of dark suffusion and some whitish terminal dots. The hindwings are whitish-ochreous, the terminal half suffused with fuscous, darker posteriorly.
