= Ardozyga crotalodes =

Scientific classification
- Kingdom: Animalia
- Phylum: Arthropoda
- Clade: Pancrustacea
- Class: Insecta
- Order: Lepidoptera
- Family: Gelechiidae
- Genus: Ardozyga
- Species: A. crotalodes

Binomial name
- Ardozyga crotalodes (Meyrick, 1904)

Synonyms
- Protolechia crotalodes Meyrick, 1904

Species of moth

Ardozyga crotalodes is a species of moth in the family Gelechiidae. It was described by Edward Meyrick in 1904. It is found in Australia, where it has been recorded from Queensland.

The wingspan is about 14 mm (0.55 in). The forewings are whitish-fuscous, sprinkled with dark fuscous and with small dark fuscous costal spots at the base and one-sixth. The stigmata are fuscous, the plical obliquely beyond the first discal, an additional dot between and above the discal. There is a dark fuscous costal mark before two-thirds, and indistinct dark fuscous dots on the posterior part of the costa and termen. The hindwings are light grey.
