= Ardozyga argocentra =

Scientific classification
- Kingdom: Animalia
- Phylum: Arthropoda
- Clade: Pancrustacea
- Class: Insecta
- Order: Lepidoptera
- Family: Gelechiidae
- Genus: Ardozyga
- Species: A. argocentra

Binomial name
- Ardozyga argocentra (Meyrick, 1904)

Synonyms
- Protolechia argocentra Meyrick, 1904

Species of moth

Ardozyga argocentra is a species of moth in the family Gelechiidae. It was described by Edward Meyrick in 1904. It is found in Australia, where it has been recorded from the state of Western Australia.

The wingspan is about 11 mm (0.43 in). The forewings are fuscous, slightly purplish-tinged, irrorated (speckled) with dark fuscous and with the stigmata formed by white dots partially surrounded with dark fuscous, the plical larger, obliquely beyond the first discal. The posterior three-fifths of the costa is marked with a series of white dots. The hindwings are grey.
