= Ardozyga xanthocephala =

Scientific classification
- Kingdom: Animalia
- Phylum: Arthropoda
- Clade: Pancrustacea
- Class: Insecta
- Order: Lepidoptera
- Family: Gelechiidae
- Genus: Ardozyga
- Species: A. xanthocephala

Binomial name
- Ardozyga xanthocephala (Meyrick, 1904)

Synonyms
- Protolechia xanthocephala Meyrick, 1904

Species of moth

Ardozyga xanthocephala is a species of moth in the family Gelechiidae. It was described by Edward Meyrick in 1904. It is found in Australia, where it has been recorded from southern Queensland and New South Wales.

The wingspan is 15–18 mm (0.59–0.71 in). The forewings are white with four dark fuscous transverse fasciae, the first narrow, straight, basal, the second narrow, interrupted beneath the costa, much dilated on the dorsum, the third moderate, narrowed and sinuate on the upper half and the fourth irregular, terminal, not reaching the tornus, including some white terminal marks. There are dark fuscous costal dots between each pair of fasciae. A transverse dark fuscous discal mark precedes and is almost confluent with the third fascia. The hindwings are grey, darker posteriorly and paler towards the base.
