= Ardozyga tabulata =

Scientific classification
- Kingdom: Animalia
- Phylum: Arthropoda
- Clade: Pancrustacea
- Class: Insecta
- Order: Lepidoptera
- Family: Gelechiidae
- Genus: Ardozyga
- Species: A. tabulata

Binomial name
- Ardozyga tabulata (Meyrick, 1904)

Synonyms
- Protolechia tabulata Meyrick, 1904

Species of moth

Ardozyga tabulata is a species of moth in the family Gelechiidae. It was described by Edward Meyrick in 1904. It is found in Australia, where it has been recorded from New South Wales and South Australia.

The wingspan is 10–12 mm (0.39–0.47 in). The forewings are fuscous irrorated with dark fuscous and with a broad pale yellow-ochreous costal streak from the base to four-fifths, becoming ochreous-whitish on the edges, enclosing five small oblique blackish costal marks, the last two confluent, its lower edge indented in the middle, partially edged with blackish-fuscous. The hindwings are dark grey in males, with an irregular pale ochreous-yellowish patch occupying the basal two-fifths. In females, the hindwings are grey-whitish, suffused with dark grey towards the margins except basally.
