= Ardozyga hylias =

Scientific classification
- Kingdom: Animalia
- Phylum: Arthropoda
- Clade: Pancrustacea
- Class: Insecta
- Order: Lepidoptera
- Family: Gelechiidae
- Genus: Ardozyga
- Species: A. hylias

Binomial name
- Ardozyga hylias (Meyrick, 1904)

Synonyms
- Protolechia hylias Meyrick, 1904

Species of moth

Ardozyga hylias is a species of moth in the family Gelechiidae. It was described by Edward Meyrick in 1904. It is found in Australia, where it has been recorded from New South Wales.

The wingspan is about 9 mm (0.35 in). The forewings are whitish, irrorated with dark fuscous and with five black costal spots from the base to three-fourths and three elongate black spots arranged along the fold, and three in a discal series obliquely beyond these respectively. There is a blackish dorsal mark near the base. The hindwings are grey, paler and thinly scaled towards the base.
