= Ardozyga actinota =

Scientific classification
- Kingdom: Animalia
- Phylum: Arthropoda
- Clade: Pancrustacea
- Class: Insecta
- Order: Lepidoptera
- Family: Gelechiidae
- Genus: Ardozyga
- Species: A. actinota

Binomial name
- Ardozyga actinota (Meyrick, 1904)

Synonyms
- Protolechia actinota Meyrick, 1904

Species of moth

Ardozyga actinota is a species of moth in the family Gelechiidae. It was described by Edward Meyrick in 1904. It is found in Australia, where it has been recorded from Western Australia.

The wingspan is 16–18 mm (0.63–0.71 in). The forewings are fuscous irrorated (speckled) with white and veins two to twelve marked with more or less indistinct blackish streaks. A stronger black streak is found along the fold from the base to two-thirds and the discal stigmata are moderate, blackish, with a black white-edged longitudinal dash lying between them. The hindwings are grey, paler towards base.
