= Ardozyga melicrata =

Scientific classification
- Kingdom: Animalia
- Phylum: Arthropoda
- Clade: Pancrustacea
- Class: Insecta
- Order: Lepidoptera
- Family: Gelechiidae
- Genus: Ardozyga
- Species: A. melicrata

Binomial name
- Ardozyga melicrata (Turner, 1919)

Synonyms
- Protolechia melicrata Turner, 1919

Species of moth

Ardozyga melicrata is a species of moth in the family Gelechiidae. It was described by Alfred Jefferis Turner in 1919. It is found in Australia, where it has been recorded from northern Queensland.

The wingspan is 10–12 mm (0.39–0.47 in). The forewings are whitish-ochreous. The stigmata are obsolete or rarely faintly indicated by minute ochreous dots. The hindwings are pale-grey.
