= Ardozyga temenitis =

Scientific classification
- Kingdom: Animalia
- Phylum: Arthropoda
- Clade: Pancrustacea
- Class: Insecta
- Order: Lepidoptera
- Family: Gelechiidae
- Genus: Ardozyga
- Species: A. temenitis

Binomial name
- Ardozyga temenitis (Meyrick, 1904)

Synonyms
- Protolechia temenitis Meyrick, 1904

Species of moth

Ardozyga temenitis is a species of moth in the family Gelechiidae. It was described by Edward Meyrick in 1904. It is found in Australia, where it has been recorded from Queensland.

The wingspan is 11–12 mm (0.43–0.47 in). The forewings are whitish in males, in females whitish-ochreous, in both suffusedly irrorated with fuscous, more especially in females, where the ground colour is almost wholly obscured. The stigmata are fuscous, in males distinct, in females very indistinct, the plical obliquely beyond the first discal, a similar dot close beneath the second discal. There is a broad cloudy fuscous fascia from three-fourths of the costa to the tornus, the posterior edge in males well-defined, in females there is a pre-terminal series of obscure pale dots. The hindwings are yellow-whitish in males, in females very pale yellow, with the terminal half in both suffused with whitish-fuscous.
