= Ardozyga trochias =

Scientific classification
- Kingdom: Animalia
- Phylum: Arthropoda
- Clade: Pancrustacea
- Class: Insecta
- Order: Lepidoptera
- Family: Gelechiidae
- Genus: Ardozyga
- Species: A. trochias

Binomial name
- Ardozyga trochias (Meyrick, 1921)

Synonyms
- Protolechia trochias Meyrick, 1921

Species of moth

Ardozyga trochias is a species of moth in the family Gelechiidae. It was described by Edward Meyrick in 1921. It is found in Australia, where it has been recorded from Queensland.

The wingspan is about 16 mm (0.63 in). The forewings are light brownish-ochreous, with scattered dark fuscous specks and with small blackish dots on the costa at the base and one-sixth. The stigmata are dark fuscous, the discal small, the plical forming a small spot rather obliquely beyond the first discal. There is a roundish fuscous blotch above the tornus, and a rather smaller one at the apex, the apex itself dark fuscous. The hindwings are light grey.
