= Ardozyga euprepta =

Scientific classification
- Kingdom: Animalia
- Phylum: Arthropoda
- Clade: Pancrustacea
- Class: Insecta
- Order: Lepidoptera
- Family: Gelechiidae
- Genus: Ardozyga
- Species: A. euprepta

Binomial name
- Ardozyga euprepta (Turner, 1933)

Synonyms
- Protolechia euprepta Turner, 1933

Species of moth

Ardozyga euprepta is a species of moth in the family Gelechiidae. It was described by Alfred Jefferis Turner in 1933. It is found in Australia, where it has been recorded from Queensland.
