= Ardozyga eustephana =

Scientific classification
- Kingdom: Animalia
- Phylum: Arthropoda
- Clade: Pancrustacea
- Class: Insecta
- Order: Lepidoptera
- Family: Gelechiidae
- Genus: Ardozyga
- Species: A. eustephana

Binomial name
- Ardozyga eustephana (Turner, 1919)

Synonyms
- Protolechia eustephana Turner, 1919

Species of moth

Ardozyga eustephana is a species of moth in the family Gelechiidae. It was described by Alfred Jefferis Turner in 1919. It is found in Australia, where it has been recorded from southern Queensland.

The wingspan is 14–16 mm (0.55–0.63 in). The forewings are fuscous-whitish with patchy fuscous irroration and an angular spot at one-third of the disc, moderate in size, embracing the first discal and plical stigmata, the second discal before two-thirds, transversely elongate. There is a sub-apical blotch and terminal line, both fuscous. The hindwings are pale-grey.
