= Ardozyga mechanistis =

Scientific classification
- Kingdom: Animalia
- Phylum: Arthropoda
- Clade: Pancrustacea
- Class: Insecta
- Order: Lepidoptera
- Family: Gelechiidae
- Genus: Ardozyga
- Species: A. mechanistis

Binomial name
- Ardozyga mechanistis (Meyrick, 1904)

Synonyms
- Protolechia mechanistis Meyrick, 1904

Species of moth

Ardozyga mechanistis is a species of moth in the family Gelechiidae. Described by Edward Meyrick in 1904, it is endemic to Australia, specifically the island of Tasmania.

The wingspan is 15–16 mm (0.59–0.63 in). The forewings are pale brownish-ochreous, faintly pinkish-tinged, irrorated (speckled) with fuscous and dark fuscous and with oblique cloudy dark fuscous marks on the costa at the base, one-fifth, and the middle. There is a row of elongate dark fuscous marks along the fold, and two spots in the disc representing the stigmata. A series of undefined cloudy dark fuscous spots is found beneath the costa posteriorly and along the termen. The hindwings are pale grey, becoming darker posteriorly.
