= Ardozyga iochlaena =

Scientific classification
- Kingdom: Animalia
- Phylum: Arthropoda
- Clade: Pancrustacea
- Class: Insecta
- Order: Lepidoptera
- Family: Gelechiidae
- Genus: Ardozyga
- Species: A. iochlaena

Binomial name
- Ardozyga iochlaena (Meyrick, 1904)

Synonyms
- Protolechia iochlaena Meyrick, 1904

Species of moth

Ardozyga iochlaena is a species of moth in the family Gelechiidae. It was described by Edward Meyrick in 1904. It is found in Australia, where it has been recorded from Western Australia.

The wingspan is 15–16 mm (0.59–0.63 in). The forewings are light fuscous, suffused with ochreous towards the base, irrorated with whitish and sprinkled with fuscous. The costal edge is finely white from one-fourth to three-fourths and the stigmata are moderate, very indistinct, dark fuscous, with the plical somewhat beyond the first discal. The hindwings are grey.
