= Ardozyga amblopis =

Scientific classification
- Kingdom: Animalia
- Phylum: Arthropoda
- Clade: Pancrustacea
- Class: Insecta
- Order: Lepidoptera
- Family: Gelechiidae
- Genus: Ardozyga
- Species: A. amblopis

Binomial name
- Ardozyga amblopis (Meyrick, 1904)

Synonyms
- Protolechia amblopis Meyrick, 1904

Species of moth

Ardozyga amblopis is a species of moth in the family Gelechiidae. It was described by Edward Meyrick in 1904. It is found in Australia, where it has been recorded from Western Australia.

The wingspan is about 12 mm (0.47 in). The forewings are whitish, densely irrorated (speckled) with dark fuscous and with indistinct blackish spots along the costa, alternating with smaller pale reddish-ochreous spots, and edged beneath with irregular ferruginous spots. There are elongate blackish spots in the disc before and beyond the middle, separated by a pale reddish-ochreous spot. There is also a blackish streak along the fold, interrupted by a pale reddish-ochreous spot in the middle and there is some undefined pale reddish-ochreous suffusion towards the apex. The hindwings are fuscous, with an irregular transparent basal patch.
