= Ardozyga semiographa =

Scientific classification
- Kingdom: Animalia
- Phylum: Arthropoda
- Clade: Pancrustacea
- Class: Insecta
- Order: Lepidoptera
- Family: Gelechiidae
- Genus: Ardozyga
- Species: A. semiographa

Binomial name
- Ardozyga semiographa (Turner, 1919)

Synonyms
- Protolechia semiographa Turner, 1919

Species of moth

Ardozyga semiographa is a species of moth in the family Gelechiidae. It was described by Alfred Jefferis Turner in 1919. It is found in Australia, where it has been recorded from Queensland.

The wingspan is about 20 mm (0.79 in). The forewings are pale-fuscous with a few fuscous scales and a sharply defined blackish blotch in the disc at one-third, including the plical and first dorsal stigmata, its outline very irregular. The hindwings are pale-grey.
