= Ardozyga micropa =

Scientific classification
- Kingdom: Animalia
- Phylum: Arthropoda
- Clade: Pancrustacea
- Class: Insecta
- Order: Lepidoptera
- Family: Gelechiidae
- Genus: Ardozyga
- Species: A. micropa

Binomial name
- Ardozyga micropa (Meyrick, 1904)

Synonyms
- Protolechia micropa Meyrick, 1904; Gelechia micropa Lower, 1897

Species of moth

Ardozyga micropa is a species of moth in the family Gelechiidae. It was described by Edward Meyrick in 1904. It is found in Australia, where it has been recorded from Victoria and South Australia.

The wingspan is 16–19 mm (0.63–0.75 in). The forewings are dark purplish-fuscous, sprinkled with grey-whitish and with five white costal dots from the middle to near the apex. The plical and second discal stigmata are white, partially darker-edged and there are some minute white dots on the termen. The hindwings are grey, darker posteriorly and with the base thinly scaled.
