= Ardozyga elassopis =

Scientific classification
- Kingdom: Animalia
- Phylum: Arthropoda
- Clade: Pancrustacea
- Class: Insecta
- Order: Lepidoptera
- Family: Gelechiidae
- Genus: Ardozyga
- Species: A. elassopis

Binomial name
- Ardozyga elassopis (Turner, 1919)

Synonyms
- Protolechia elassopis Turner, 1919

Species of moth

Ardozyga elassopis is a species of moth in the family Gelechiidae. It was described by Alfred Jefferis Turner in 1919. It is found in Australia, where it has been recorded from Queensland.

The wingspan is about 9 mm (0.35 in). The forewings are whitish irrorated with grey, more closely so beneath the costa and towards the termen. The stigmata are blackish, minute, the plical beyond the first discal. The hindwings are pale-grey.
