= Ardozyga thyrsoptera =

Scientific classification
- Kingdom: Animalia
- Phylum: Arthropoda
- Clade: Pancrustacea
- Class: Insecta
- Order: Lepidoptera
- Family: Gelechiidae
- Genus: Ardozyga
- Species: A. thyrsoptera

Binomial name
- Ardozyga thyrsoptera (Meyrick, 1904)

Synonyms
- Protolechia thyrsoptera Meyrick, 1904

Species of moth

Ardozyga thyrsoptera is a species of moth in the family Gelechiidae. It was described by Edward Meyrick in 1904. It is found in Australia, where it has been recorded from Queensland.

The wingspan is about 14 mm (0.55 in). The forewings are pale fuscous, irregularly mixed with darker and with a pale basal patch, its edge running from two-fifths of the costa to the dorsum near the base, enclosing small dark fuscous costal spots at the base and one-fifth. Beyond this a transverse dark fuscous spot from the costa, terminating beneath in two divergent slender partially white-edged arms, terminated and connected on the fold by a blackish streak produced anteriorly to the basal patch. There is a short black elongate mark in the disc above the middle and a rather ill-defined black longitudinal streak from the middle of the disc to the termen beneath the apex, with an interrupted branch to the costa above the apex and a cloudy white dot resting on this representing the second discal stigma. There is also a series of small dark fuscous spots separated by whitish dots on the posterior half of the costa and an interrupted whitish dark-edged terminal line. The hindwings are grey, darker towards the apex.
