= List of moths of Australia (Gelechiidae) =

Partial list of Australian moths

This is a list of the Australian moth species of the family Gelechiidae. It also acts as an index to the species articles and forms part of the full List of moths of Australia.

== Anacampsinae ==
- Aproaerema coracina (Meyrick, 1921)
- Aproaerema isoscelixantha (Lower, 1897)
- Aproaerema simplexella (Walker, 1864)
- Chaliniastis astrapaea Meyrick, 1904
- Idiophantis chiridota Meyrick, 1914
- Idiophantis habrias Meyrick, 1904
- Idiophantis insomnis (Meyrick, 1904)
- Pauroneura brachysticha Turner, 1919
- Scindalmota limata Turner, 1919
- Thiotricha acronipha Turner, 1919
- Thiotricha animosella (Walker, 1864)
- Thiotricha anticentra Meyrick, 1904
- Thiotricha argyrea Turner, 1919
- Thiotricha arthrodes Meyrick, 1904
- Thiotricha atractodes Meyrick, 1922
- Thiotricha bullata Meyrick, 1904
- Thiotricha chrysopa Meyrick, 1904
- Thiotricha complicata Meyrick, 1918
- Thiotricha hemiphaea Turner, 1919
- Thiotricha leucothona Meyrick, 1904
- Thiotricha margarodes Meyrick, 1904
- Thiotricha niphastis Meyrick, 1904
- Thiotricha oxytheces Meyrick, 1904
- Thiotricha panglycera Turner, 1919
- Thiotricha paraconta Meyrick, 1904
- Thiotricha parthenica Meyrick, 1904
- Thiotricha prosoestea Turner, 1919
- Epiphthora achnias Meyrick, 1904
- Epiphthora acrocola Turner, 1927
- Epiphthora acropasta Turner, 1919
- Epiphthora anisaula (Meyrick, 1921)
- Epiphthora autoleuca Meyrick, 1904
- Epiphthora belonodes Meyrick, 1904
- Epiphthora chionocephala (Lower, 1901)
- Epiphthora coniombra Meyrick, 1904
- Epiphthora cryolopha Meyrick, 1904
- Epiphthora delochorda Lower, 1918
- Epiphthora dinota (Turner, 1933)
- Epiphthora drosias Meyrick, 1904
- Epiphthora harpastis Meyrick, 1904
- Epiphthora hexagramma (Meyrick, 1921)
- Epiphthora hyperaenicta Turner, 1927
- Epiphthora isonira Meyrick, 1904
- Epiphthora lemurella Meyrick, 1904
- Epiphthora leptoconia Turner, 1919
- Epiphthora leucomichla Meyrick, 1904
- Epiphthora megalornis Meyrick, 1904
- Epiphthora miarodes Meyrick, 1904
- Epiphthora microtima Meyrick, 1904
- Epiphthora niphaula Meyrick, 1904
- Epiphthora phantasta Meyrick, 1904
- Epiphthora poliopasta Turner, 1919
- Epiphthora psychrodes Meyrick, 1904
- Epiphthora spectrella Meyrick, 1904
- Epiphthora thyellias Meyrick, 1904
- Epiphthora zalias (Meyrick, 1922)
- Aristotelia antipala Meyrick, 1904
- Aristotelia aphthoropa Turner, 1939
- Aristotelia centrosema (Lower, 1893)
- Aristotelia clavata Meyrick, 1914
- Aristotelia crypsixantha Turner, 1919
- Aristotelia epicharta Turner, 1919
- Aristotelia epimetalla Meyrick, 1904
- Aristotelia eurypsola Turner, 1919
- Aristotelia furtiva Meyrick, 1904
- Aristotelia hemisarca Lower, 1916
- Aristotelia iomarmara Meyrick, 1921
- Aristotelia ivae Busck, 1900
- Aristotelia macrothecta Meyrick, 1904
- Aristotelia ochrostephana Turner, 1933
- Aristotelia pamphaea Meyrick, 1904
- Aristotelia sinistra Meyrick, 1904
- Aristotelia sticheris Turner, 1919
- Aristotelia tetracosma Meyrick, 1904
- Aristotelia themerastis Turner, 1919
- Aristotelia thetica Meyrick, 1904
- Aristotelia turbida Turner, 1919
- Catameces peribapta (Lower, 1918)
- Deltophora peltosema (Lower, 1900)
- Dorycnopa heliochares (Lower, 1900)
- Dorycnopa marmorea (Lower, 1899)
- Dorycnopa orthodesma (Lower, 1901)
- Dorycnopa triphera Lower, 1920
- Iulota bacillum (Turner, 1927)
- Iulota epispila (Lower, 1897)
- Iulota ischnora Turner, 1919
- Iulota ithyxyla Meyrick, 1904
- Iulota ochropolia Turner, 1939
- Iulota phauloptila Turner, 1919
- Iulota triglossa Meyrick, 1904
- Leptogeneia bicristata Meyrick, 1904
- Proselotis ischnoptila (Turner, 1919)
- Pycnobathra achroa (Lower, 1901)
- Pycnobathra acromelas (Turner, 1919)
- Pycnobathra aenictodes Turner, 1919
- Pycnobathra aphileta Meyrick, 1904
- Pycnobathra astemphella Meyrick, 1904
- Pycnobathra centrosema Meyrick, 1904
- Pycnobathra chalcoscia Meyrick, 1904
- Pycnobathra clavata Meyrick, 1914
- Pycnobathra coniodes Meyrick, 1904
- Pycnobathra euxena Meyrick, 1904
- Pycnobathra hoplitis Meyrick, 1904
- Pycnobathra inficeta Meyrick, 1904
- Pycnobathra ischnota Meyrick, 1904
- Pycnobathra isotis Meyrick, 1904
- Pycnobathra melitopis Meyrick, 1904
- Pycnobathra niphodes (Lower, 1897)
- Pycnobathra oxyphanes Meyrick, 1904
- Pycnobathra pityritis Meyrick, 1904
- Pycnobathra platyleuca Meyrick, 1904
- Pycnobathra popularis Meyrick, 1904
- Pycnobathra sclerotricha Meyrick, 1904
- Pycnobathra sematacma Meyrick, 1921
- Pycnobathra stratimera (Lower, 1897)
- Pyncostola actias (Meyrick, 1904)
- Pyncostola sciopola (Meyrick, 1904)
- Pyncostola stalactis (Meyrick, 1904)

== Chelariinae ==
- Anarsia anisodonta Diakonoff, 1954
- Anarsia centrospila (Turner, 1919)
- Anarsia dryinopa Lower, 1897
- Anarsia epiula Meyrick, 1904
- Anarsia hippocoma Meyrick, 1921
- Anarsia leucophora Meyrick, 1904
- Anarsia molybdota Meyrick, 1904
- Anarsia patulella (Walker, 1864)
- Anisoplaca bathropis (Meyrick, 1904)
- Decatopseustis cataphanes Common, 1958
- Decatopseustis xanthastis (Lower, 1896)
- Hypatima ammonura (Meyrick, 1921)
- Hypatima attenuata (Meyrick, 1920)
- Hypatima baliodes (Lower, 1920)
- Hypatima cyrtopleura (Turner, 1919)
- Hypatima dermatica (Meyrick, 1921)
- Hypatima deviella (Walker, 1864)
- Hypatima discissa (Meyrick, 1916)
- Hypatima euplecta (Meyrick, 1904)
- Hypatima harpophora (Meyrick, 1921)
- Hypatima metaphorica (Meyrick, 1921)
- Hypatima microgramma (Meyrick, 1920)
- Hypatima orthostathma (Meyrick, 1921)
- Hypatima scotia (Turner, 1919)
- Hypatima simulacrella (Meyrick, 1904)
- Hypatima spathota (Meyrick, 1913)
- Hypatima sphenophora (Meyrick, 1904)
- Hypatima tenebrosa (Meyrick, 1920)
- Hypatima tessulata (Meyrick, 1921)
- Hypatima toreuta (Turner, 1919)
- Macracaena adela Common, 1958
- Pectinophora endema Common, 1958
- Pectinophora gossypiella (Saunders, 1844)
- Pectinophora scutigera (Holdaway, 1926)
- Pexicopia arenicola Common, 1958
- Pexicopia catharia Common, 1958
- Pexicopia cryphia Common, 1958
- Pexicopia dascia Common, 1958
- Pexicopia desmanthes (Lower, 1898)
- Pexicopia diasema Common, 1958
- Pexicopia dictyomorpha (Lower, 1900)
- Pexicopia epactaea (Meyrick, 1904)
- Pexicopia euryanthes (Meyrick, 1922)
- Pexicopia mimetica Common, 1958
- Pexicopia nephelombra (Meyrick, 1904)
- Pexicopia paliscia Common, 1958
- Pexicopia pheletes Common, 1958
- Pexicopia proselia Common, 1958
- Pexicopia pycnoda (Lower, 1899)
- Pexicopia trimetropis (Meyrick, 1922)
- Sitotroga cerealella (Olivier, 1789)

== Dichomerinae ==
- Arotria iophaea Meyrick, 1904
- Atasthalistis ochreoviridella (Pagenstecher, 1900)
- Atasthalistis pyrocosma Meyrick, 1886
- Atasthalistis tricolor (R. Felder & Rogenhofer, 1875)
- Dichomeris achlyodes (Meyrick, 1904)
- Dichomeris acrogypsa Turner, 1919
- Dichomeris acuminatus (Staudinger, 1876)
- Dichomeris adactella (Walker, 1864)
- Dichomeris capnites (Meyrick, 1904)
- Dichomeris chalcophaea Meyrick, 1921
- Dichomeris cirrhostola Turner, 1919
- Dichomeris dryinodes (Lower, 1897)
- Dichomeris dysorata Turner, 1919
- Dichomeris holomela (Lower, 1897)
- Dichomeris iodorus (Meyrick, 1904)
- Dichomeris lutivittata Meyrick, 1921
- Dichomeris lygropa (Lower, 1903)
- Dichomeris melanophylla (Turner, 1919)
- Dichomeris melichrous (Meyrick, 1904)
- Dichomeris mesoctenis Meyrick, 1921
- Dichomeris peristylis (Meyrick, 1904)
- Dichomeris pleuroleuca Turner, 1919
- Dichomeris pleurophaea (Turner, 1919)
- Dichomeris thanatopsis (Lower, 1901)
- Dichomeris xuthochyta Turner, 1919
- Dichomeris zygophorus (Meyrick, 1904)
- Empalactis sporogramma (Meyrick, 1921)
- Holaxyra ancylosticha (Turner, 1919)
- Hylograptis thryptica Meyrick, 1910
- Hyodectis crenoides Meyrick, 1904
- Mesophleps apentheta (Turner, 1919)
- Mesophleps argonota (Lower, 1901)
- Mesophleps chloranthes (Lower, 1900)
- Mesophleps crocina (Meyrick, 1904)
- Mesophleps cycnobathra (Lower, 1898)
- Mesophleps epiochra (Meyrick, 1886)
- Mesophleps macrosemus (Lower, 1900)
- Mesophleps meliphanes (Lower, 1894)
- Mesophleps mylicotis (Meyrick, 1904)
- Mesophleps ochroloma (Lower, 1901)
- Mesophleps palpigera (Walsingham, 1891)
- Mesophleps parvella Li & Sattler, 2012
- Mesophleps tephrastis (Meyrick, 1904)
- Mesophleps tetrachroa (Lower, 1898)
- Mesophleps trichombra (Lower, 1898)
- Mesophleps truncatella Li & Sattler, 2012
- Myconita plutelliformis (Snellen, 1901)
- Nothris mesophracta Turner, 1919
- Onebala amethystina (Meyrick, 1904)
- Onebala choristis (Meyrick, 1904)
- Onebala euargyra (Turner, 1919)
- Onebala hibisci (Stainton, 1859)
- Onebala iridosoma (Meyrick, 1918)
- Onebala zapyrodes (Turner, 1919)
- Rhadinophylla siderosema Turner, 1919
- Streniastis composita Meyrick, 1922
- Streniastis thermaea (Lower, 1897)
- Symbolistis argyromitra Meyrick, 1904
- Symbolistis orophota Meyrick, 1904
- Telephila plasticus (Meyrick, 1904)

== Gelechiinae ==
- Australiopalpa bumerang Povolný, 1974
- Australiopalpa commoni Povolný, 1974
- Australiopalpa tristis Povolný, 1974
- Ephysteris promptella (Staudinger, 1859)
- Ephysteris silignitis (Turner, 1919)
- Ephysteris subdiminutella (Stainton, 1867)
- Macrenches clerica (Rosenstock, 1885)
- Macrenches eurybatis Meyrick, 1904
- Phthorimaea operculella (Zeller, 1873)
- Sarotorna eridora Meyrick, 1904
- Sarotorna mesoleuca (Lower, 1900)
- Sarotorna myrrhina Turner, 1919
- Sarotorna stenodes (Turner, 1936)
- Scrobipalpa aptatella (Walker, 1864)
- Scrobipalpa eschatopis (Meyrick, 1904)
- Scrobipalpa leucocephala (Lower, 1893)
- Scrobipalpa nonyma (Turner, 1919)
- Scrobipalpa pyrrhanthes (Meyrick, 1904)
- Smenodoca erebenna Meyrick, 1904
- Stegasta allactis Meyrick, 1904
- Stegasta cosmodes (Lower, 1899)
- Stegasta tenebricosa Turner, 1919
- Stegasta variana Meyrick, 1904
- Symmetrischema tangolias (Gyen, 1913)
- Physoptila termiticola (Turner, 1926)
- Ardozyga aclera (Meyrick, 1904)
- Ardozyga acrocrossa (Turner, 1947)
- Ardozyga acroleuca (Meyrick, 1904)
- Ardozyga actinota (Meyrick, 1904)
- Ardozyga aeolopis (Meyrick, 1904)
- Ardozyga amblopis (Meyrick, 1904)
- Ardozyga ananeura (Meyrick, 1904)
- Ardozyga annularia (Turner, 1919)
- Ardozyga anthracina (Meyrick, 1904)
- Ardozyga arenaria (Turner, 1933)
- Ardozyga arganthes (Meyrick, 1904)
- Ardozyga argocentra (Meyrick, 1904)
- Ardozyga aspetodes (Meyrick, 1904)
- Ardozyga autopis (Meyrick, 1904)
- Ardozyga aversella (Walker, 1864)
- Ardozyga banausodes (Meyrick, 1904)
- Ardozyga bistrigata (Meyrick, 1921)
- Ardozyga caminopis (Meyrick, 1904)
- Ardozyga catarrhacta (Meyrick, 1904)
- Ardozyga celidophora (Turner, 1919)
- Ardozyga cephalota (Meyrick, 1904)
- Ardozyga ceramica (Meyrick, 1904)
- Ardozyga chalazodes (Turner, 1919)
- Ardozyga chenias (Meyrick, 1904)
- Ardozyga chionoprora (Turner, 1927)
- Ardozyga chiradia (Meyrick, 1904)
- Ardozyga cladara (Meyrick, 1904)
- Ardozyga compsochroa (Meyrick, 1904)
- Ardozyga cosmotis (Meyrick, 1904)
- Ardozyga creperrima (Turner, 1919)
- Ardozyga crotalodes (Meyrick, 1904)
- Ardozyga crypsibatis (Meyrick, 1904)
- Ardozyga crypsicneca (Turner, 1927)
- Ardozyga cryptosperma (Meyrick, 1921)
- Ardozyga decaspila (Lower, 1899)
- Ardozyga deltodes (Lower, 1896)
- Ardozyga desmatra (Lower, 1897)
- Ardozyga diplanetis (Meyrick, 1904)
- Ardozyga diplonesa (Meyrick, 1904)
- Ardozyga dysclyta (Turner, 1933)
- Ardozyga dysphanes (Turner, 1947)
- Ardozyga elassopis (Turner, 1919)
- Ardozyga elpistis (Meyrick, 1904)
- Ardozyga emmeles (Turner, 1933)
- Ardozyga enchotypa (Turner, 1919)
- Ardozyga englypta (Meyrick, 1904)
- Ardozyga eumela (Lower, 1897)
- Ardozyga euprepta (Turner, 1933)
- Ardozyga euryarga (Turner, 1919)
- Ardozyga eustephana (Turner, 1919)
- Ardozyga exarista (Meyrick, 1904)
- Ardozyga flexilis (Meyrick, 1904)
- Ardozyga frugalis (Meyrick, 1904)
- Ardozyga furcifera (Turner, 1919)
- Ardozyga galactopa (Meyrick, 1916)
- Ardozyga glagera (Turner, 1919)
- Ardozyga gorgonias (Meyrick, 1904)
- Ardozyga gypsocrana (Turner, 1919)
- Ardozyga haemaspila (Lower, 1894)
- Ardozyga hedana (Turner, 1919)
- Ardozyga hilara (Turner, 1919)
- Ardozyga hormodes (Meyrick, 1904)
- Ardozyga hylias (Meyrick, 1904)
- Ardozyga hypocneca (Turner, 1919)
- Ardozyga hypoleuca (Meyrick, 1904)
- Ardozyga idiospila (Meyrick, 1922)
- Ardozyga invalida (Meyrick, 1904)
- Ardozyga involuta (Turner, 1919)
- Ardozyga iochlaena (Meyrick, 1904)
- Ardozyga irobela (Turner, 1947)
- Ardozyga ithygramma (Turner, 1933)
- Ardozyga liota (Meyrick, 1904)
- Ardozyga lithina (Lower, 1899)
- Ardozyga loemias (Meyrick, 1904)
- Ardozyga loxodesma (Meyrick, 1904)
- Ardozyga mechanistis (Meyrick, 1904)
- Ardozyga megalommata (Meyrick, 1904)
- Ardozyga megalosticta (Turner, 1919)
- Ardozyga melicrata (Turner, 1919)
- Ardozyga mesochra (Lower, 1894)
- Ardozyga mesopsamma (Turner, 1919)
- Ardozyga microdora (Meyrick, 1904)
- Ardozyga micropa (Meyrick, 1904)
- Ardozyga molyntis (Meyrick, 1904)
- Ardozyga nephelota (Meyrick, 1904)
- Ardozyga neurosticha (Turner, 1933)
- Ardozyga nothrodes (Meyrick, 1921)
- Ardozyga nyctias (Meyrick, 1904)
- Ardozyga obeliscota (Meyrick, 1904)
- Ardozyga obscura (Turner, 1933)
- Ardozyga ochrobathra (Turner, 1933)
- Ardozyga odorifera (Meyrick, 1904)
- Ardozyga orthanotos (Lower, 1900)
- Ardozyga pacifica (Meyrick, 1904)
- Ardozyga pelogenes (Meyrick, 1906)
- Ardozyga pelogramma (Meyrick, 1904)
- Ardozyga penthicodes (Meyrick, 1921)
- Ardozyga phasianis (Meyrick, 1904)
- Ardozyga phloeodes (Meyrick, 1904)
- Ardozyga plinthactis (Meyrick, 1904)
- Ardozyga poenicea (Turner, 1947)
- Ardozyga polioxysta (Turner, 1933)
- Ardozyga prisca (Meyrick, 1904)
- Ardozyga proscripta (Meyrick, 1921)
- Ardozyga psephias (Meyrick, 1904)
- Ardozyga pyrrhica (Turner, 1919)
- Ardozyga sarisias (Meyrick, 1904)
- Ardozyga sciodes (Meyrick, 1904)
- Ardozyga scytina (Meyrick, 1904)
- Ardozyga secta (Meyrick, 1921)
- Ardozyga semiographa (Turner, 1919)
- Ardozyga sisyraea (Meyrick, 1904)
- Ardozyga sodalisella (Walker, 1864)
- Ardozyga sporodeta (Turner, 1919)
- Ardozyga stratifera (Meyrick, 1904)
- Ardozyga subnexella (Walker, 1864)
- Ardozyga tabulata (Meyrick, 1904)
- Ardozyga taracta (Turner, 1919)
- Ardozyga telopis (Meyrick, 1904)
- Ardozyga temenitis (Meyrick, 1904)
- Ardozyga tetralychna Lower, 1902
- Ardozyga tetraploa (Meyrick, 1904)
- Ardozyga thanatodes (Lower, 1893)
- Ardozyga thermoplaca Lower, 1902
- Ardozyga thyridota (Meyrick, 1904)
- Ardozyga thyrsoptera (Meyrick, 1904)
- Ardozyga trachyphanes (Meyrick, 1904)
- Ardozyga trichalina (Meyrick, 1904)
- Ardozyga trichosema (Meyrick, 1904)
- Ardozyga trichroma (Turner, 1933)
- Ardozyga tridecta (Lower, 1900)
- Ardozyga trochias (Meyrick, 1921)
- Ardozyga tyroessa (Turner, 1933)
- Ardozyga vacatella (Walker, 1864)
- Ardozyga voluta (Meyrick, 1904)
- Ardozyga xanthocephala (Meyrick, 1904)
- Ardozyga xestolitha (Meyrick, 1904)
- Ardozyga xuthias (Meyrick, 1904)
- Corynaea dilechria Turner, 1919
- Craspedotis diasticha Turner, 1919
- Craspedotis pragmatica Meyrick, 1904
- Craspedotis soloeca Meyrick, 1904
- Craspedotis thinodes Meyrick, 1904
- Ephelictis megalarthra Meyrick, 1904
- Ephelictis neochalca Meyrick, 1904
- Epibrontis hemichlaena (Lower, 1897)
- Epibrontis pallacopa Meyrick, 1922
- Epimimastis catopta Turner, 1919
- Epimimastis porphyroloma (Lower, 1897)
- Epimimastis tegminata Meyrick, 1916
- Hemiarcha bleptodes Turner, 1919
- Hemiarcha caliginosa Turner, 1919
- Hemiarcha macroplaca (Lower, 1893)
- Hemiarcha metableta Turner, 1933
- Hemiarcha tetrasticta Turner, 1919
- Hemiarcha thermochroa (Lower, 1893)
- Oncerozancla euopa Turner, 1933
- Orthoptila abruptella (Walker, 1864)
- Pancoenia pelota Meyrick, 1904
- Pancoenia periphora Meyrick, 1904
- Pancoenia pygmaea Turner, 1919
- Phaeotypa stenochorda (Turner, 1933)
- Sphaleractis epiclysta Meyrick, 1920
- Sphaleractis eurysema Meyrick, 1904
- Sphaleractis parasticta Meyrick, 1904
- Sphaleractis platyleuca (Lower, 1897)
- Tanycyttara xanthomochla Turner, 1933
- Tritadelpha microptila Meyrick, 1904

The following species belongs to the subfamily Gelechiinae, but has not been assigned to a genus yet. Given here is the original name given to the species when it was first described:

- Gelechia anthochra Lower, 1896
- Phthorimaea chersochlora Meyrick, 1922
- Barea ectadia Turner, 1935
- Trachyntis epipona Meyrick, 1902
- Phthorimaea frequens Meyrick, 1921
- Psoricoptera melanoptila Lower, 1897
- Hemiarcha polioleuca Turner, 1919
- Gelechia callicoma Lower, 1897
- Gelechia cannanella Lower, 1897
- Borkhausenia catochopis Meyrick, 1920
- Copidostola dimorpha Lower, 1897
- Gelechia heliochrysa Lower, 1897
- Ypsolophus inodes Lower, 1897
- Gelechia lividella Lower, 1897
- Gelechia marmoratella Walker, 1864
- Paltodora orthocrossa Lower, 1897
- Gelechia petrodes Lower, 1897
- Phyllocnistis spilota Turner, 1947

== Sources ==
- Gelechiinae at Australian Faunal Directory
