= List of gelechiid genera: J =

The large moth family Gelechiidae contains the following genera:

- Julota
