= Craspedotis =

Scientific classification
- Domain: Eukaryota
- Kingdom: Animalia
- Phylum: Arthropoda
- Class: Insecta
- Order: Lepidoptera
- Family: Gelechiidae
- Subfamily: Gelechiinae
- Genus: Craspedotis; Meyrick, 1904

Genus of moths

Craspedotis is a genus of moths in the family Gelechiidae.

== Species ==
- Craspedotis diasticha Turner, 1919
- Craspedotis pragmatica Meyrick, 1904
- Craspedotis soloeca Meyrick, 1904
- Craspedotis thinodes Meyrick, 1904
