= Empalactis =

Scientific classification
- Domain: Eukaryota
- Kingdom: Animalia
- Phylum: Arthropoda
- Class: Insecta
- Order: Lepidoptera
- Family: Gelechiidae
- Tribe: Chelariini
- Genus: Empalactis; Meyrick, 1925

Genus of moths

Empalactis is a genus of moths in the family Gelechiidae.

== Species ==
- Empalactis ponomarenkoae Ueda, 2012
- Empalactis sporogramma Meyrick, 1921
