= Symbolistis =

Scientific classification
- Domain: Eukaryota
- Kingdom: Animalia
- Phylum: Arthropoda
- Class: Insecta
- Order: Lepidoptera
- Family: Gelechiidae
- Subfamily: Dichomeridinae
- Genus: Symbolistis; Meyrick, 1904

Genus of moths

Symbolistis is a genus of moth in the family Gelechiidae.

== Species ==
- Symbolistis argyromitra Meyrick, 1904
- Symbolistis orophota Meyrick, 1904
