= Streniastis =

Scientific classification
- Domain: Eukaryota
- Kingdom: Animalia
- Phylum: Arthropoda
- Class: Insecta
- Order: Lepidoptera
- Family: Gelechiidae
- Subfamily: Dichomeridinae
- Genus: Streniastis; Meyrick, 1904

Genus of moths

Streniastis is a genus of moth in the family Gelechiidae.

== Species ==
- Streniastis composita Meyrick, 1922
- Streniastis thermaea Lower, 1897
