= Pancoenia =

Scientific classification
- Domain: Eukaryota
- Kingdom: Animalia
- Phylum: Arthropoda
- Class: Insecta
- Order: Lepidoptera
- Family: Gelechiidae
- Subfamily: Gelechiinae
- Genus: Pancoenia; Meyrick, 1904

Genus of moths

Pancoenia is a genus of moth in the family Gelechiidae.

== Species ==
- Pancoenia pelota Meyrick, 1904
- Pancoenia periphora Meyrick, 1904
- Pancoenia pygmaea Turner, 1919
