= Ardozyga lithina =

Scientific classification
- Kingdom: Animalia
- Phylum: Arthropoda
- Clade: Pancrustacea
- Class: Insecta
- Order: Lepidoptera
- Family: Gelechiidae
- Genus: Ardozyga
- Species: A. lithina

Binomial name
- Ardozyga lithina (Lower, 1899)

Synonyms
- Gelechia lithina Lower, 1899; Protolechia lithina

Species of moth

Ardozyga lithina is a species of moth in the family Gelechiidae. It was described by Oswald Bertram Lower in 1899. It is found in Australia, where it has been recorded from New South Wales.

The wingspan is about 12 mm (0.47 in). The forewings are whitish, densely irrorated (speckled) with dark fuscous. The stigmata are large, dark fuscous, partially edged with white, the plical rather obliquely beyond the first discal, a similar spot between the first and second discal. There is a row of undefined white spots along the posterior half of the costa and termen. The hindwings are light grey, darker posteriorly.

The larvae have been recorded feeding on Dodonaea lobulata.
