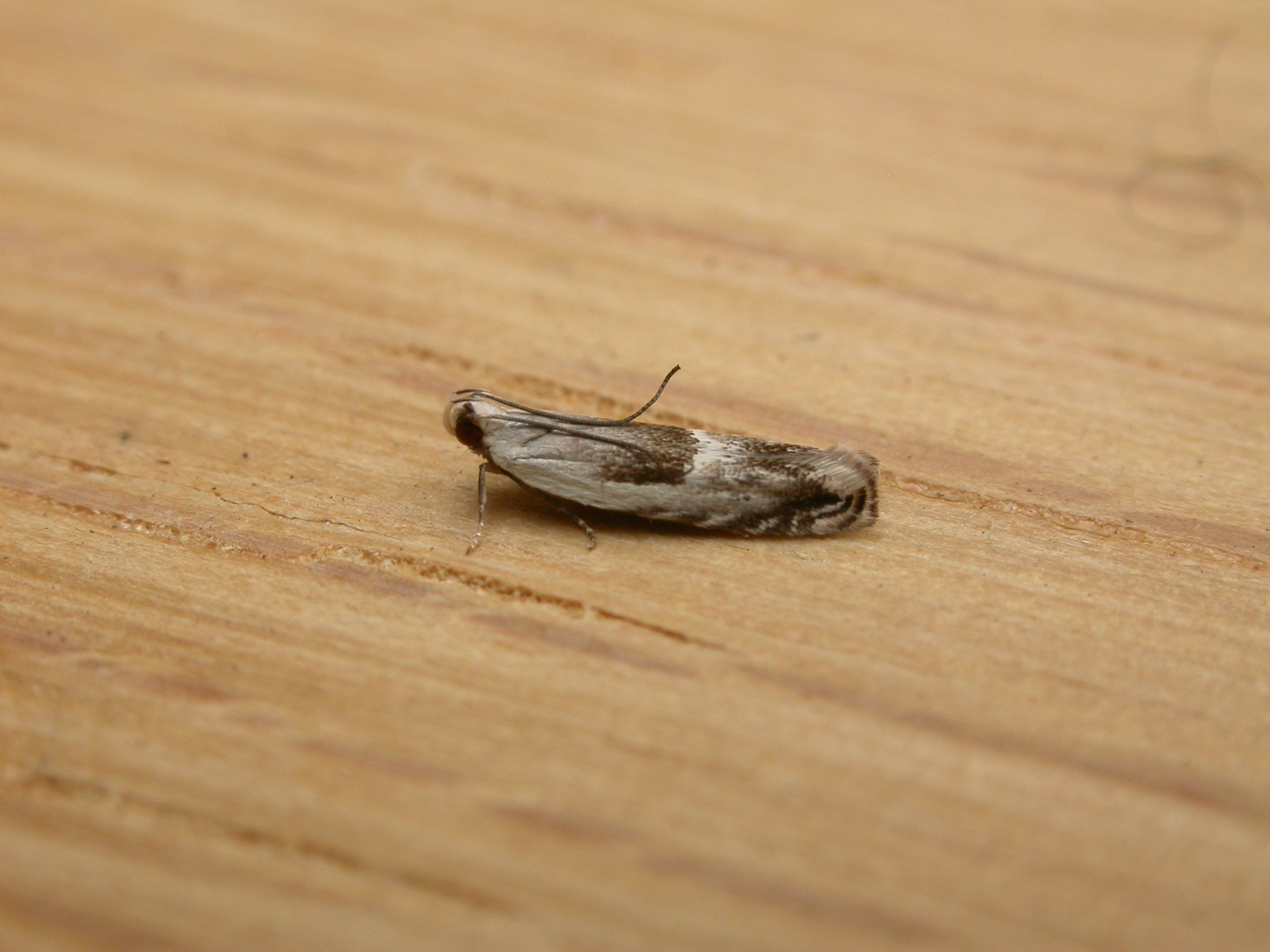
- Epibrontis hemichlaena

Scientific classification
- Domain: Eukaryota
- Kingdom: Animalia
- Phylum: Arthropoda
- Class: Insecta
- Order: Lepidoptera
- Family: Gelechiidae
- Subfamily: Gelechiinae
- Genus: Epibrontis; Meyrick, 1904

= Epibrontis =

Genus of moths

Epibrontis is a genus of moths in the family Gelechiidae.

== Species ==
- Epibrontis hemichlaena (Lower, 1897)
- Epibrontis pallacopa Meyrick, 1922
