= Australiopalpa =

Scientific classification
- Kingdom: Animalia
- Phylum: Arthropoda
- Clade: Pancrustacea
- Class: Insecta
- Order: Lepidoptera
- Family: Gelechiidae
- Tribe: Gnorimoschemini
- Genus: Australiopalpa; Povolný, 1974

Genus of moths

Australiopalpa is a genus of moths in the family Gelechiidae.

== Species ==
- Australiopalpa bumerang Povolný, 1974
- Australiopalpa commoni Povolný, 1974
- Australiopalpa tristis Povolný, 1974
