= Empalactis ponomarenkoae =

Scientific classification
- Domain: Eukaryota
- Kingdom: Animalia
- Phylum: Arthropoda
- Class: Insecta
- Order: Lepidoptera
- Family: Gelechiidae
- Genus: Empalactis
- Species: E. ponomarenkoae

Binomial name
- Empalactis ponomarenkoae Ueda, 2012

Species of moth

Empalactis ponomarenkoae is a moth in the family Gelechiidae. It was described by Ueda in 2012. It is found in Japan (Honshu, Kyushu).

== Description ==
The length of the forewings is 4.5–6 mm for males and 5.5–6 mm for females.
