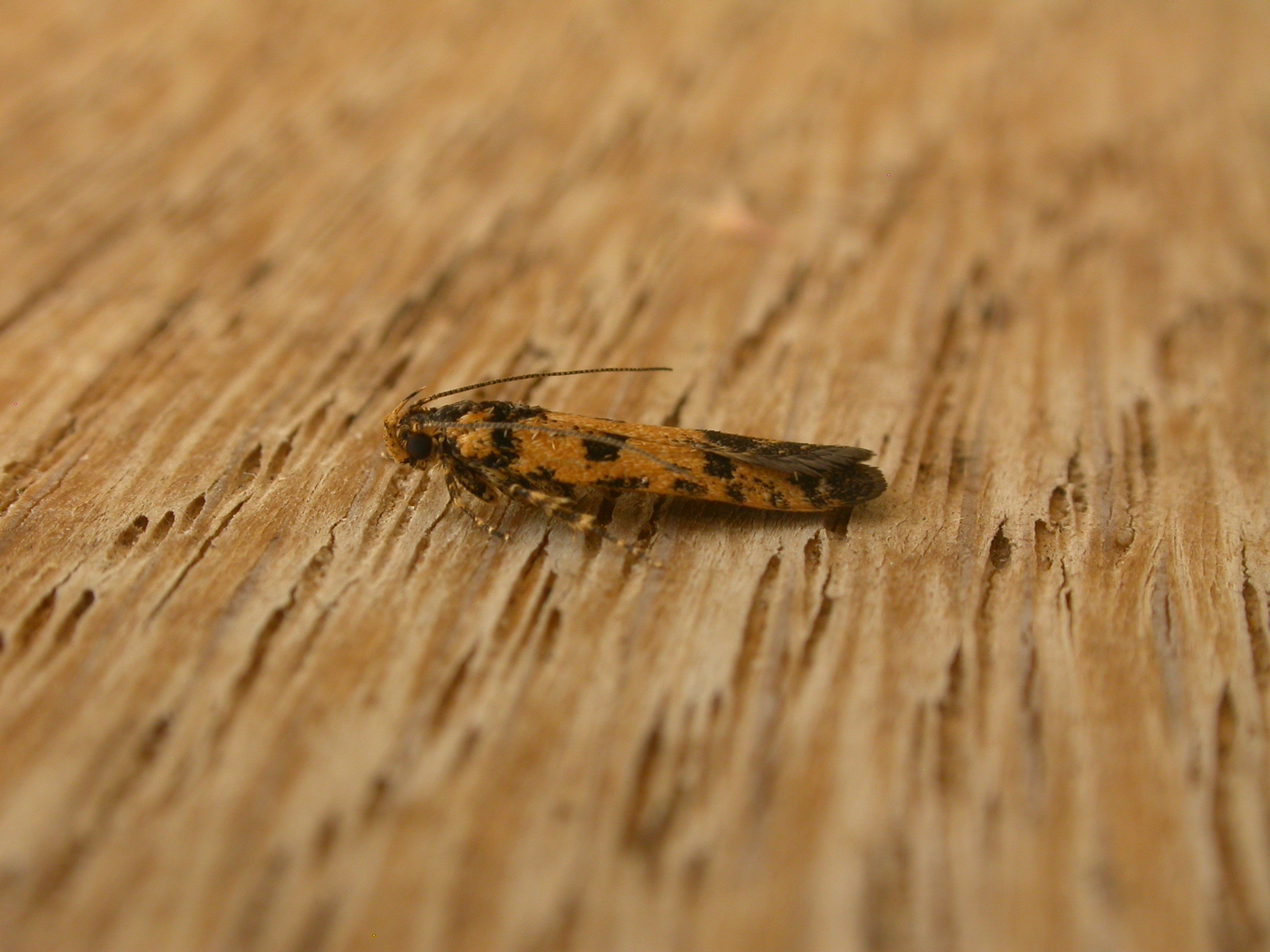

Scientific classification
- Domain: Eukaryota
- Kingdom: Animalia
- Phylum: Arthropoda
- Class: Insecta
- Order: Lepidoptera
- Family: Gelechiidae
- Subfamily: Gelechiinae
- Genus: Hemiarcha; Meyrick, 1904

= Hemiarcha =

Genus of moths

Hemiarcha is a genus of moths in the family Gelechiidae.

== Species ==
- Hemiarcha bleptodes Turner, 1919
- Hemiarcha caliginosa Turner, 1919
- Hemiarcha macroplaca (Lower, 1893)
- Hemiarcha melanogastra Diakonoff, 1954
- Hemiarcha metableta Turner, 1933
- Hemiarcha polioleuca Turner, 1919
- Hemiarcha tetrasticta Turner, 1919
- Hemiarcha thermochroa (Lower, 1893)
