= Sphagiocrates =

Scientific classification
- Domain: Eukaryota
- Kingdom: Animalia
- Phylum: Arthropoda
- Class: Insecta
- Order: Lepidoptera
- Family: Gelechiidae
- Genus: Sphagiocrates; Meyrick, 1925

Genus of moths

Sphagiocrates is a genus of moth in the family Gelechiidae.

== Species ==
- Sphagiocrates chersochlora (Meyrick, 1922)
- Sphagiocrates lusoria (Meyrick, 1922)
