= Sphaleractis =

Scientific classification
- Domain: Eukaryota
- Kingdom: Animalia
- Phylum: Arthropoda
- Class: Insecta
- Order: Lepidoptera
- Family: Gelechiidae
- Subfamily: Gelechiinae
- Genus: Sphaleractis; Meyrick, 1904

Genus of moths

Sphaleractis is a genus of moth in the family Gelechiidae.

== Species ==
- Sphaleractis platyleuca (Lower, 1897)
- Sphaleractis eurysema Meyrick, 1904
- Sphaleractis epiclysta Meyrick, 1920
- Sphaleractis parasticta Meyrick, 1904
