= Sphagiocrates lusoria =

Scientific classification
- Domain: Eukaryota
- Kingdom: Animalia
- Phylum: Arthropoda
- Class: Insecta
- Order: Lepidoptera
- Family: Gelechiidae
- Genus: Sphagiocrates
- Species: S. lusoria

Binomial name
- Sphagiocrates lusoria (Meyrick, 1922)

Synonyms
- Brachmia lusoria Meyrick, 1922

Species of moth

Sphagiocrates lusoria is a moth of the family Gelechiidae. It was described by Edward Meyrick in 1922. It is found on Java and Sumatra in Indonesia.

The wingspan is 23–24 mm. The basal area of the forewings is suffused with orange and there is a violet-brown suffused streak along the costa from the base to near the apex. A short dark brown streak is found on the dorsal edge near the base and there is a streak of ferruginous-orange suffusion from the base along the fold to the plical stigma. The stigmata are represented by spots of orange suffusion, sometimes purplish mixed, the first discal large, rather beyond the plical. There is a shade of orange-purplish suffusion from four-fifths of the costa to three-fourths of the dorsum, well-defined posteriorly and with an angular projection in the middle. There is some slight orange suffusion along the termen. The hindwings are whitish.
