= Hemiarcha melanogastra =

Scientific classification
- Kingdom: Animalia
- Phylum: Arthropoda
- Class: Insecta
- Order: Lepidoptera
- Family: Gelechiidae
- Genus: Hemiarcha
- Species: H. melanogastra

Binomial name
- Hemiarcha melanogastra Diakonoff, 1954

Species of moth

Hemiarcha melanogastra is a moth in the family Gelechiidae. It was described by Alexey Diakonoff in 1954. It is found in New Guinea.
