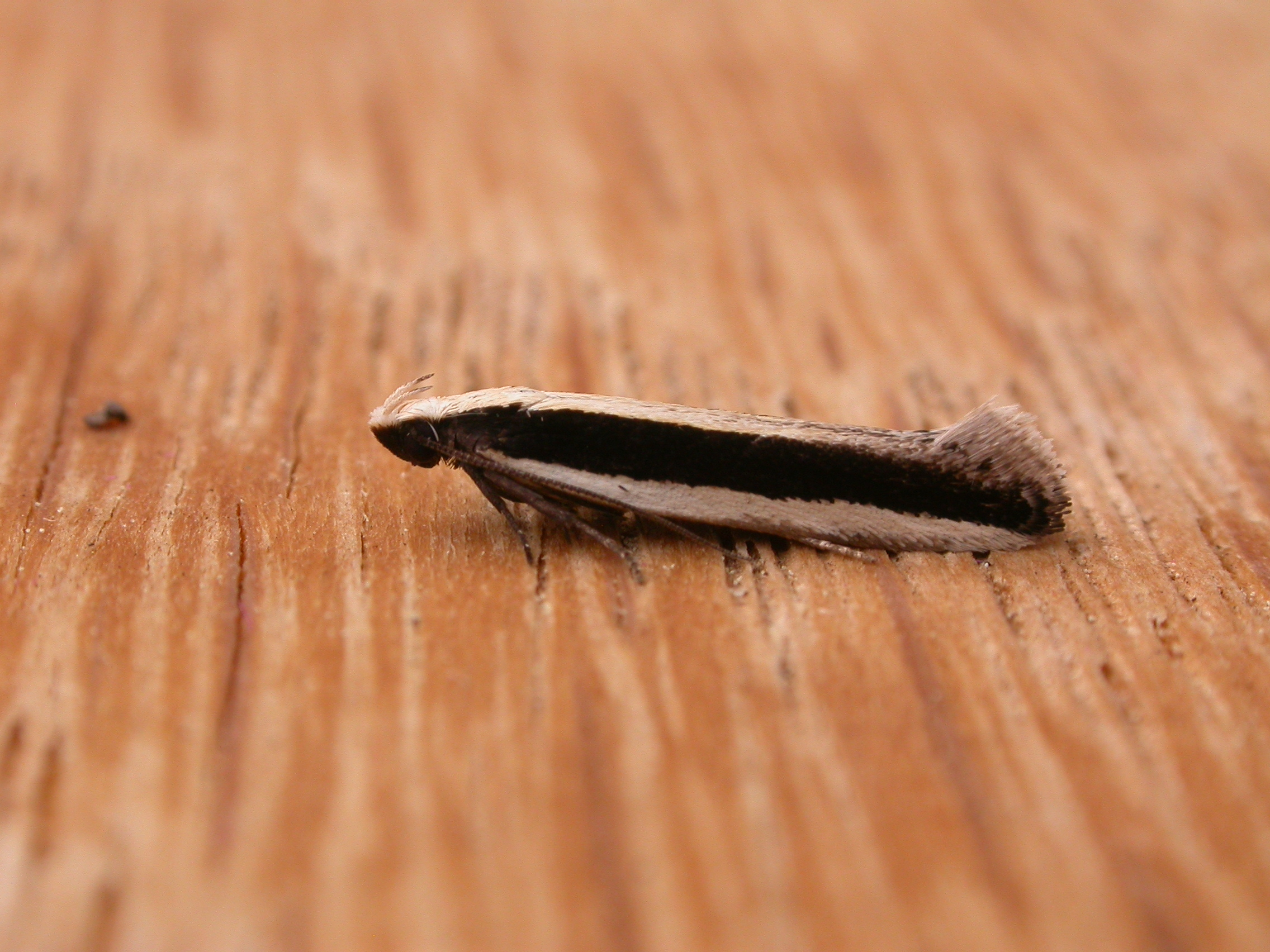
- Macrenches clerica

Scientific classification
- Domain: Eukaryota
- Kingdom: Animalia
- Phylum: Arthropoda
- Class: Insecta
- Order: Lepidoptera
- Family: Gelechiidae
- Subfamily: Gelechiinae
- Genus: Macrenches; Meyrick, 1904

= Macrenches =

Genus of moth

Macrenches is a genus of moth in the family Gelechiidae.

== Species ==
- Macrenches clerica (Rosenstock, 1885)
- Macrenches eurybatis Meyrick, 1904
