= Decatopseustis =

Scientific classification
- Kingdom: Animalia
- Phylum: Arthropoda
- Clade: Pancrustacea
- Class: Insecta
- Order: Lepidoptera
- Family: Gelechiidae
- Subfamily: Apatetrinae
- Genus: Decatopseustis; Meyrick, 1925

Genus of moths

Decatopseustis is a genus of moths in the family Gelechiidae.

== Species ==
- Decatopseustis cataphanes Common, 1958
- Decatopseustis xanthastis (Lower, 1896)
