= Craspedotis thinodes =

Scientific classification
- Kingdom: Animalia
- Phylum: Arthropoda
- Class: Insecta
- Order: Lepidoptera
- Family: Gelechiidae
- Genus: Craspedotis
- Species: C. thinodes

Binomial name
- Craspedotis thinodes Meyrick, 1904

Species of moth

Craspedotis thinodes is a moth in the family Gelechiidae. It was described by Edward Meyrick in 1904. It is found in Australia, where it has been recorded from New South Wales, Victoria and South Australia.

The wingspan is 10–11 mm (0.39–0.43 in). The forewings are light brownish ochreous, irrorated (sprinkled) with dark fuscous, the dorsal area broadly clear from the base to near the tornus. There is an ochreous-white costal streak from rather near the base to rather near the apex, attenuated towards the extremities. The second discal stigma is very indistinct and dark fuscous. The hindwings are pale grey, thinly scaled and darker posteriorly.
