= Empalactis sporogramma =

Scientific classification
- Domain: Eukaryota
- Kingdom: Animalia
- Phylum: Arthropoda
- Class: Insecta
- Order: Lepidoptera
- Family: Gelechiidae
- Genus: Empalactis
- Species: E. sporogramma

Binomial name
- Empalactis sporogramma (Meyrick, 1921)

Synonyms
- Nothris sporogramma Meyrick, 1921

Species of moth

Empalactis sporogramma is a moth in the family Gelechiidae. It was described by Edward Meyrick in 1921. It is found in northern Australia.

The wingspan is about 9 mm. The forewings are ochreous whitish, more ochreous tinged posteriorly and with black dots on the costa at about one-third and beyond the middle. There are subcostal and median longitudinal series of irregularly arranged black scales in the posterior half of the wing, and some on the fold forming two elongate subconfluent marks posteriorly. The hindwings are grey whitish, towards the apex whitish ochreous.
