= Dichomeris melichrous =

Scientific classification
- Kingdom: Animalia
- Phylum: Arthropoda
- Class: Insecta
- Order: Lepidoptera
- Family: Gelechiidae
- Genus: Dichomeris
- Species: D. melichrous

Binomial name
- Dichomeris melichrous (Meyrick, 1904)

Synonyms
- Ypsolophus melichrous Meyrick, 1904

Species of moth

Dichomeris melichrous is a moth in the family Gelechiidae. It was described by Edward Meyrick in 1904. It is found in Australia, where it has been recorded from New South Wales.

The wingspan is about 15 mm (0.59 in). The forewings are whitish grey ochreous, the dorsal two-thirds tinged with light brown reddish. There is a small brown-reddish spot on the dorsum at one-fourth. The stigmata are faintly traceable, reddish, with the plical obliquely before the first discal. The hindwings are whitish grey, with a faint purplish tinge.
