= Dichomeris pleurophaea =

Scientific classification
- Domain: Eukaryota
- Kingdom: Animalia
- Phylum: Arthropoda
- Class: Insecta
- Order: Lepidoptera
- Family: Gelechiidae
- Genus: Dichomeris
- Species: D. pleurophaea

Binomial name
- Dichomeris pleurophaea (Turner, 1919)

Synonyms
- Eurysara pleurophaea Turner, 1919; Dichomeris hyalombra Meyrick, 1922

Species of moth

Dichomeris pleurophaea is a moth in the family Gelechiidae. It was described by Alfred Jefferis Turner in 1919. It is found in Australia, where it has been recorded from Queensland.

The wingspan is about 18 mm (0.71 in). The forewings are pale ochreous-brown, with the costa dark-fuscous throughout, commencing as a broad line from the base, widening at one-fourth to a blotch extending half across the disc, narrowing to a point shortly before the apex. There is a minute fuscous dot on the fold in the middle, and another above the tornus, as well as a transverse ferruginous-brown line from the apex of the costal patch to the termen. The apex is suffused with ferruginous-brown. The hindwings are dark-grey.
