= Dichomeris adactella =

Scientific classification
- Kingdom: Animalia
- Phylum: Arthropoda
- Class: Insecta
- Order: Lepidoptera
- Family: Gelechiidae
- Genus: Dichomeris
- Species: D. adactella

Binomial name
- Dichomeris adactella (Walker, 1864)

Synonyms
- Gelechia adactella Walker, 1864

Species of moth

Dichomeris adactella is a moth in the family Gelechiidae. It was described by Francis Walker in 1864. It is found in Australia.

Adults are cupreous with white forewings with an interrupted and abbreviated cupreous-white speckled costal stripe. The apical area is cupreous. The hindwings are whitish cinereous (ash grey) towards the base.
