= Nothris mesophracta =

"Nothris" mesophracta

Scientific classification
- Kingdom: Animalia
- Phylum: Arthropoda
- Clade: Pancrustacea
- Class: Insecta
- Order: Lepidoptera
- Family: Gelechiidae
- Subfamily: Anacampsinae
- Tribe: Chelariini
- Genus: incertae sedis
- Species: "N." mesophracta

Binomial name
- "Nothris" mesophracta Turner, 1919

Synonyms
- Mesophleps mesophracta; Xerometra mesophracta

Species of moth

"Nothris" mesophracta is a moth of the family Gelechiidae. It is found in Australia (Victoria, Tasmania).

The wingspan is about 24 mm. The forewings are whitish with a few fuscous scales mostly on the veins and a broad median dark-fuscous streak from the base to the apex, and prolonged through the cilia. The hindwings are whitish-grey.
