= Sphaleractis epiclysta =

Scientific classification
- Kingdom: Animalia
- Phylum: Arthropoda
- Class: Insecta
- Order: Lepidoptera
- Family: Gelechiidae
- Genus: Sphaleractis
- Species: S. epiclysta

Binomial name
- Sphaleractis epiclysta Meyrick, 1920

Species of moth

Sphaleractis epiclysta is a moth in the family Gelechiidae. It was described by Edward Meyrick in 1920. It is found in Australia, where it has been recorded from New South Wales and Tasmania.

The wingspan is 9–11 mm. The forewings are fuscous suffusedly sprinkled with dark fuscous and with the costa from one-third to near the apex suffused with white mixed with dark fuscous sprinkles. The second discal stigma is dark fuscous. The hindwings are light grey.
