= Craspedotis pragmatica =

Scientific classification
- Kingdom: Animalia
- Phylum: Arthropoda
- Class: Insecta
- Order: Lepidoptera
- Family: Gelechiidae
- Genus: Craspedotis
- Species: C. pragmatica

Binomial name
- Craspedotis pragmatica Meyrick, 1904

Species of moth

Craspedotis pragmatica is a moth in the family Gelechiidae. It was described by Edward Meyrick in 1904. It is found in Australia, where it has been recorded from New South Wales.

The wingspan is 10–11 mm (0.39–0.43 in). The forewings are whitish, irregularly mixed with fuscous and sprinkled with dark fuscous, the dorsal half sometimes suffused with light brownish. There is a bar of dark fuscous suffusion from the costa almost at the base to beneath the fold at one-fourth. The stigmata are rather large and dark fuscous, the plical obliquely beyond the first discal, the second discal transverse. The hindwings are pale grey, thinly scaled and darker grey posteriorly.
