= Sphaleractis parasticta =

Scientific classification
- Kingdom: Animalia
- Phylum: Arthropoda
- Class: Insecta
- Order: Lepidoptera
- Family: Gelechiidae
- Genus: Sphaleractis
- Species: S. parasticta

Binomial name
- Sphaleractis parasticta Meyrick, 1904

Species of moth

Sphaleractis parasticta is a moth in the family Gelechiidae. It was described by Edward Meyrick in 1904. It is found in Australia, where it has been recorded from New South Wales and Western Australia.

The wingspan is 9–13 mm (0.35–0.51 in). The forewings are light bronzy fuscous, darker on the costal half and with a broad white costal streak from the base to five-sixths, including a black dot near the apex, the costal edge sometimes fuscous tinged beyond the middle. The plical stigma and a dot towards the tornus are rather large and blackish and there are indications of minute black and white dots on the termen. The hindwings are whitish grey.
