= Decatopseustis cataphanes =

Scientific classification
- Domain: Eukaryota
- Kingdom: Animalia
- Phylum: Arthropoda
- Class: Insecta
- Order: Lepidoptera
- Family: Gelechiidae
- Genus: Decatopseustis
- Species: D. cataphanes

Binomial name
- Decatopseustis cataphanes Common, 1958

Species of moth

Decatopseustis cataphanes is a moth of the family Gelechiidae. It was described by Ian Francis Bell Common in 1958. It is found in Australia, where it has been recorded from the Australian Capital Territory.
