= Dichomeris peristylis =

Scientific classification
- Kingdom: Animalia
- Phylum: Arthropoda
- Class: Insecta
- Order: Lepidoptera
- Family: Gelechiidae
- Genus: Dichomeris
- Species: D. peristylis

Binomial name
- Dichomeris peristylis (Meyrick, 1904)

Synonyms
- Ypsolophus peristylis Meyrick, 1904; Dichomeris perlevis Turner, 1919

Species of moth

Dichomeris peristylis is a moth in the family Gelechiidae. It was described by Edward Meyrick in 1904. It is found in Australia, where it has been recorded from Queensland and Western Australia.

The wingspan is about 12 mm (0.47 in). The forewings are whitish suffused with grey and with fuscous dots, one on the fold at one-fourth, the first discal about the middle, the second at three-fourths and the plical before the first discal. There is an interrupted blackish line around the apex and termen. The hindwings are pale grey.
