= Dichomeris iodorus =

Scientific classification
- Kingdom: Animalia
- Phylum: Arthropoda
- Class: Insecta
- Order: Lepidoptera
- Family: Gelechiidae
- Genus: Dichomeris
- Species: D. iodorus

Binomial name
- Dichomeris iodorus (Meyrick, 1904)

Synonyms
- Ypsolophus iodorus Meyrick, 1904

Species of moth

Dichomeris iodorus is a moth in the family Gelechiidae. It was described by Edward Meyrick in 1904. It is found in Australia, where it has been recorded from Queensland.

The wingspan is about 15 mm (0.59 in). The forewings are rather dark fuscous, slightly tinged with purple reddish and with about six ferruginous marks arranged in a double longitudinal series in the disc above the middle. The hindwings are fuscous.
