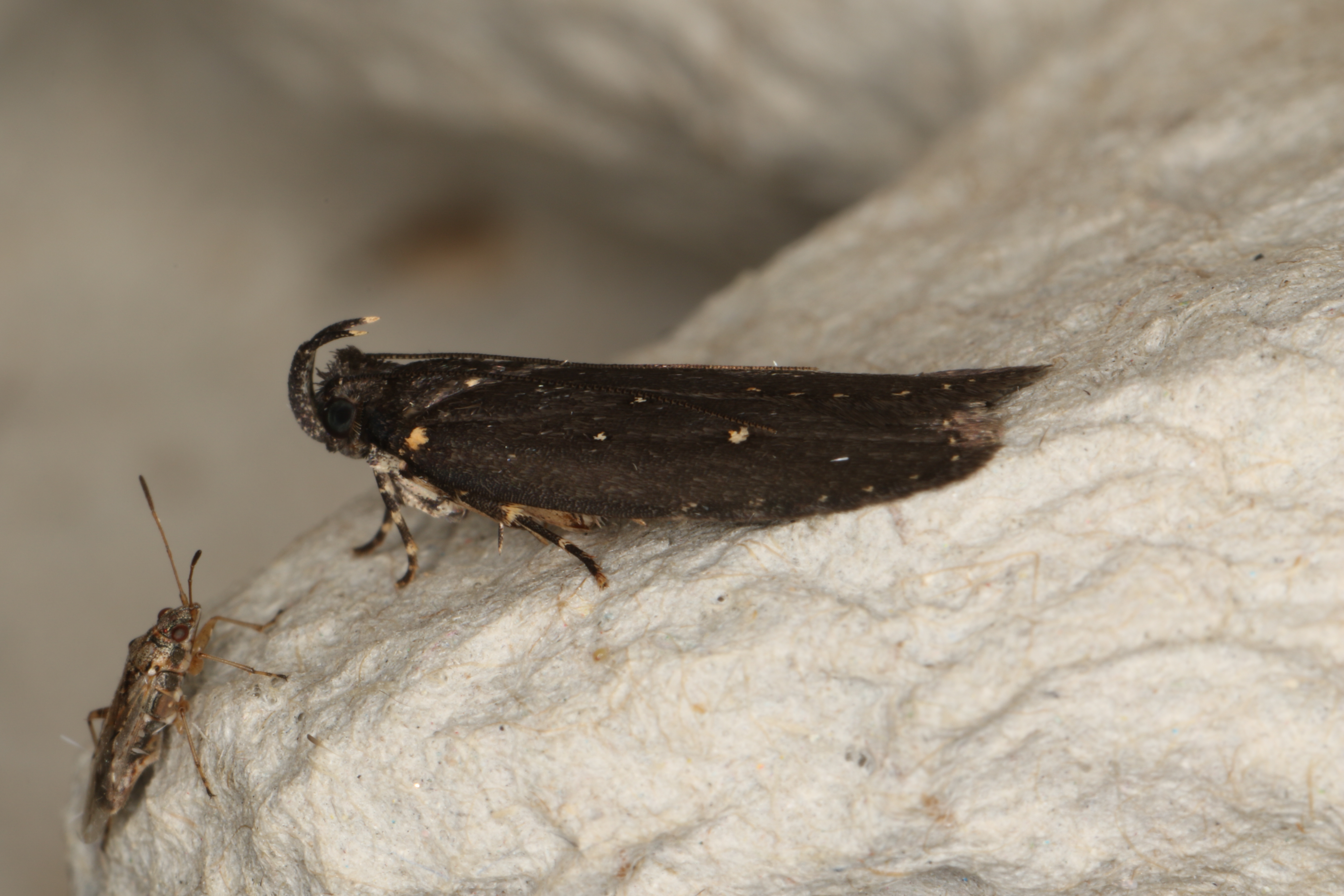
- Merimbula, NSW, 10/11 December 2015

Scientific classification
- Kingdom: Animalia
- Phylum: Arthropoda
- Clade: Pancrustacea
- Class: Insecta
- Order: Lepidoptera
- Family: Gelechiidae
- Genus: Ardozyga
- Species: A. nyctias

Binomial name
- Ardozyga nyctias (Meyrick, 1904)

Synonyms
- Protolechia nyctias Meyrick, 1904

= Ardozyga nyctias =

Species of moth

Ardozyga nyctias is a species of moth in the family Gelechiidae. It was described by Edward Meyrick in 1904. It is found in Australia, where it has been recorded from southern Queensland and New South Wales.

The wingspan is about 18 mm (0.71 in). The forewings are dark fuscous irrorated with ashy-grey and with a conspicuous pale ochreous basal dot in the middle. The stigmata are moderate, dark fuscous, accompanied by some white scales, with the plical somewhat beyond the first discal. There are some obscure grey-whitish dots along the posterior half of the costa and termen. The hindwings are fuscous, darker posteriorly.

The larvae feed on the young shoots of Corymbia torelliana, living between leaves joined with silk.
