= Streniastis composita =

Scientific classification
- Kingdom: Animalia
- Phylum: Arthropoda
- Class: Insecta
- Order: Lepidoptera
- Family: Gelechiidae
- Genus: Streniastis
- Species: S. composita

Binomial name
- Streniastis composita Meyrick, 1922

Species of moth

Streniastis composita is a moth in the family Gelechiidae. It was described by Edward Meyrick in 1922. It is found in Australia, where it has been recorded from Queensland.

The wingspan is about 14 mm. The forewings are grey, suffusedly sprinkled with whitish and sprinkled with blackish. There are indistinct narrow dark grey transverse fasciae at the middle and three-fourths, the first bisinuate, the second straight. The hindwings are rather dark grey.
