= Pancoenia pelota =

Scientific classification
- Kingdom: Animalia
- Phylum: Arthropoda
- Class: Insecta
- Order: Lepidoptera
- Family: Gelechiidae
- Genus: Pancoenia
- Species: P. pelota

Binomial name
- Pancoenia pelota Meyrick, 1904

Species of moth

Pancoenia pelota is a moth in the family Gelechiidae. It was described by Edward Meyrick in 1904. It is found in Australia, where it has been recorded from New South Wales.

The wingspan is about 12 mm (0.47 in). The forewings are whitish fuscous, irrorated with fuscous and dark fuscous and with the costal edge suffusedly dark fuscous on the anterior half. The stigmata are dark fuscous, the plical obliquely beyond the first discal. There is a suffused dark fuscous mark from the tornus towards the second discal, not reaching it. There is also a connected series of dark fuscous marks along the posterior part of the costa and termen. The hindwings are grey.
