= Iulota epispila =

Scientific classification
- Kingdom: Animalia
- Phylum: Arthropoda
- Clade: Pancrustacea
- Class: Insecta
- Order: Lepidoptera
- Family: Gelechiidae
- Genus: Iulota
- Species: I. epispila

Binomial name
- Iulota epispila (Lower, 1897)

Synonyms
- Aristotelia epispila Lower, 1897

Species of moth

Iulota epispila is a moth of the family Gelechiidae. It was described by Oswald Bertram Lower in 1897. It is found in Australia, where it has been recorded from South Australia and Tasmania.

The wingspan is about 12 mm (0.47 in). The forewings are pale brownish with a broad, whitish, longitudinal streak from the base to the apex, occupying the upper half of the wing throughout. There are two dark fuscous dots, one before and one beyond the middle of the disc, placed on the upper edge of the ground colour. There are also some suffused fuscous spots towards the hindmargin. The hindwings are whitish.
