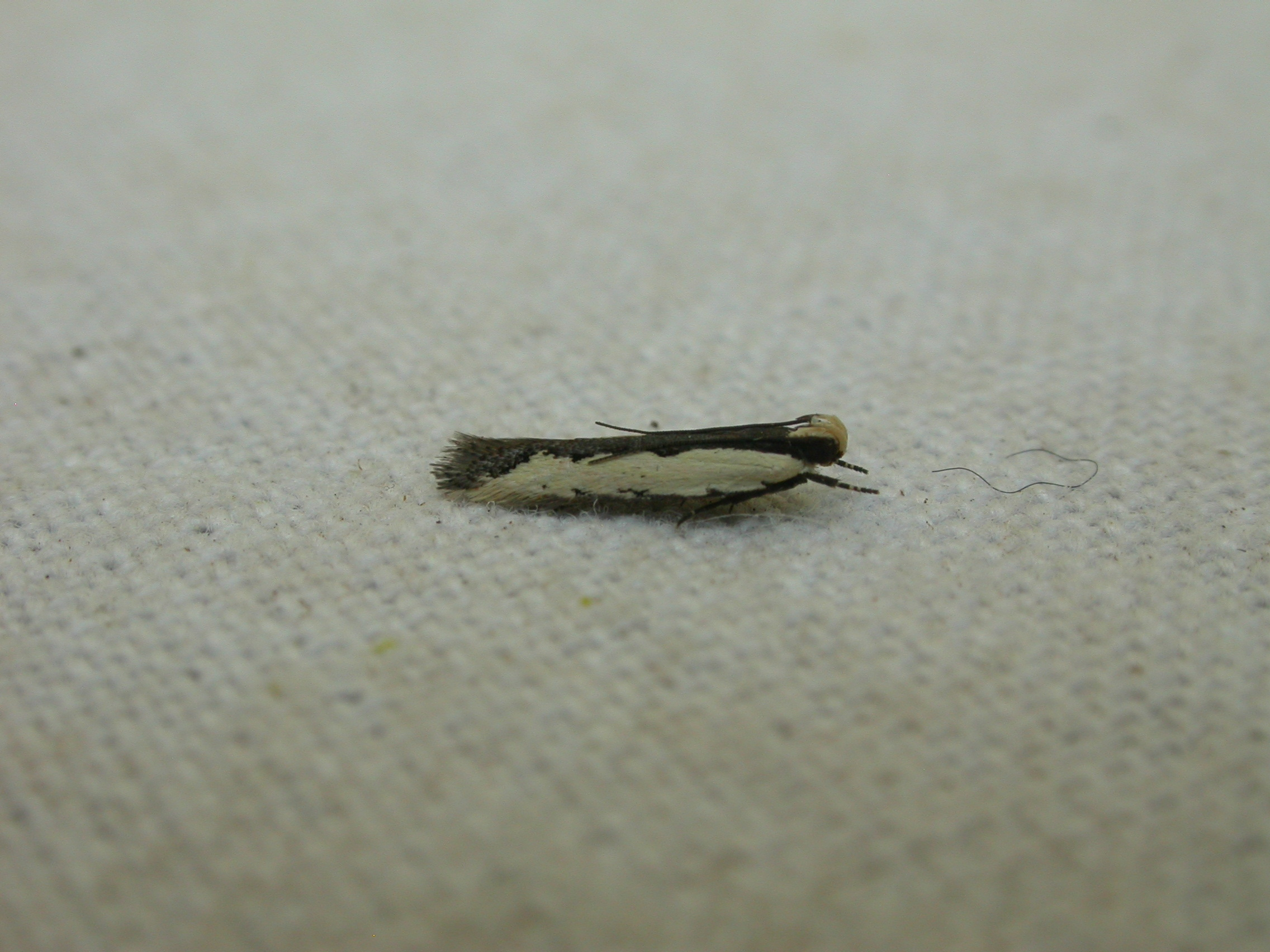

Scientific classification
- Kingdom: Animalia
- Phylum: Arthropoda
- Clade: Pancrustacea
- Class: Insecta
- Order: Lepidoptera
- Family: Gelechiidae
- Genus: Ardozyga
- Species: A. mesochra

Binomial name
- Ardozyga mesochra (Lower, 1894)

Synonyms
- Gelechia mesochra Lower, 1894; Protolechia mesochra

= Ardozyga mesochra =

Species of moth

Ardozyga mesochra is a species of moth of the family Gelechiidae. It is found in Australia, where it has been recorded in Queensland, New South Wales, South Australia, Victoria and Tasmania.

The wingspan is 11–16 mm (0.43–0.63 in). The forewings are whitish-ochreous, faintly yellowish-tinged and with four or five fine oblique dark fuscous marks on the costa, usually very small, sometimes connected or absorbed into a moderate streak extending from near the base to five-sixths. There is a broad rather dark fuscous streak along the dorsum and termen to the apex, the upper edge irregular, more or less marked with blackish, variably prominent at one-third, two-thirds, and near the apex, and indented between these. The hindwings are grey, darker posteriorly.
