= Australiopalpa bumerang =

Scientific classification
- Kingdom: Animalia
- Phylum: Arthropoda
- Clade: Pancrustacea
- Class: Insecta
- Order: Lepidoptera
- Family: Gelechiidae
- Genus: Australiopalpa
- Species: A. bumerang

Binomial name
- Australiopalpa bumerang Povolný, 1974

Species of moth

Australiopalpa bumerang is a species of moth in the family Gelechiidae. It was described by Povolný in 1974. It is found in Australia, where it has been recorded from Queensland.
