= Iulota bacillum =

Scientific classification
- Domain: Eukaryota
- Kingdom: Animalia
- Phylum: Arthropoda
- Class: Insecta
- Order: Lepidoptera
- Family: Gelechiidae
- Genus: Iulota
- Species: I. bacillum

Binomial name
- Iulota bacillum (Turner, 1927)

Synonyms
- Aristotelia bacillum Turner, 1927

Species of moth

Iulota bacillum is a moth of the family Gelechiidae. It was described by Alfred Jefferis Turner in 1927. It is found in Australia, where it has been recorded from Tasmania.

The wingspan is 14–16 mm. The forewings are whitish more or less tinged with pink and irrorated with fuscous and sometimes with a broad whitish costal streak throughout, and a fuscous median streak, well-defined on the costal edge, suffused towards the dorsum. In other examples the costal streak may be more or less obliterated by fuscous irroration, and the median streak scarcely developed. The stigmata are fuscous, not always distinct, the first at one-fourth above the middle, the second on the fold beyond the first and the third in the middle of the disc towards the costa. There is sometimes a fourth beneath and slightly beyond the first. The hindwings are pale-grey.
