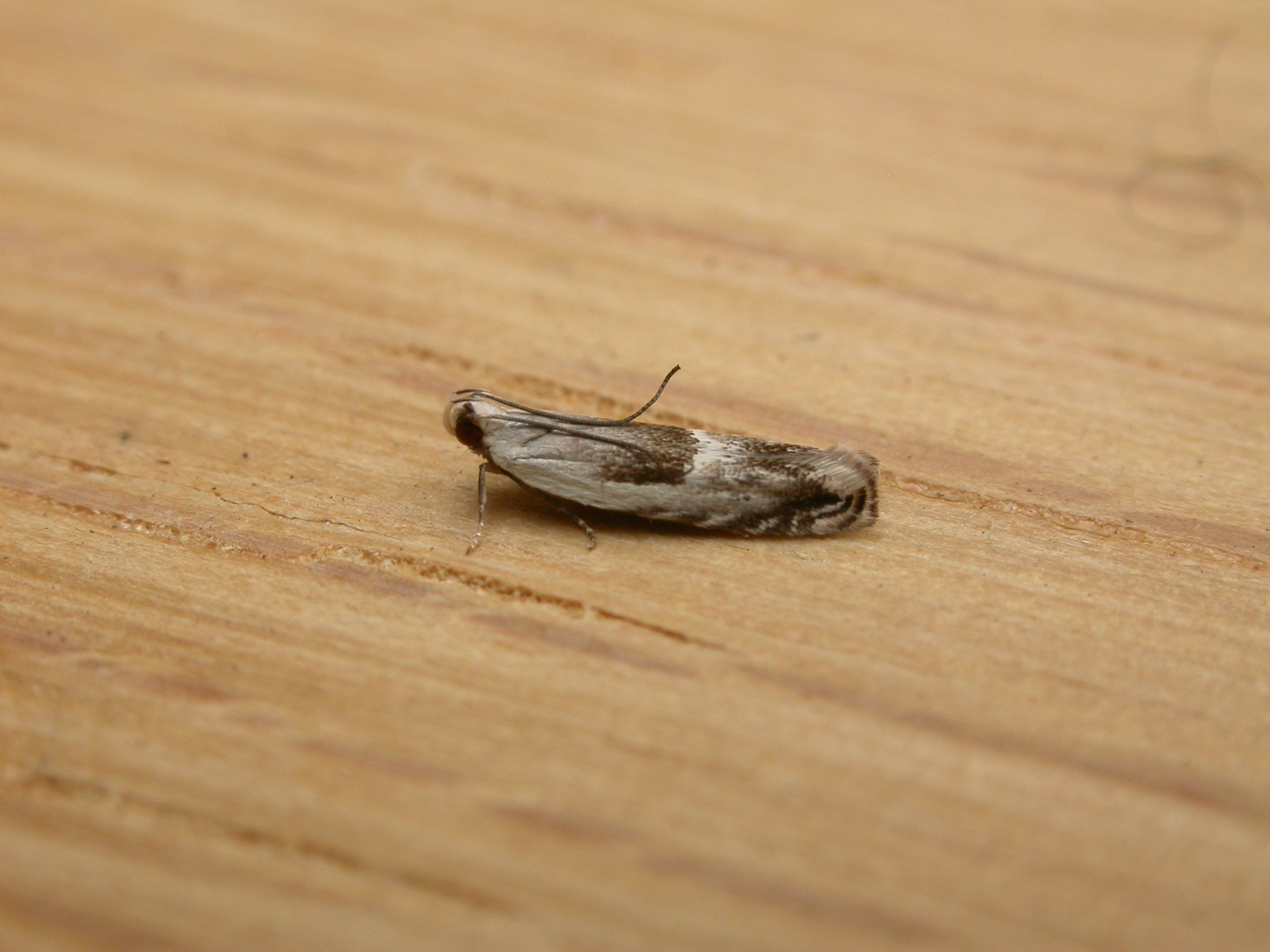

Scientific classification
- Domain: Eukaryota
- Kingdom: Animalia
- Phylum: Arthropoda
- Class: Insecta
- Order: Lepidoptera
- Family: Gelechiidae
- Genus: Epibrontis
- Species: E. hemichlaena

Binomial name
- Epibrontis hemichlaena (Lower, 1897)

Synonyms
- Gelechia hemichlaena Lower, 1897; Epibrontis hemichlaema

= Epibrontis hemichlaena =

Species of moth

Epibrontis hemichlaena is a moth in the family Gelechiidae described by Oswald Bertram Lower in 1897. It is found in Australia, where it has been recorded from Queensland, New South Wales, Victoria, the Australian Capital Territory, South Australia, Western Australia, and Tasmania.

The wingspan is 10–12 mm (0.39–0.47 in). The forewings are white, irrorated (sprinkled) with brown on the posterior half and two short very oblique dark fuscous marks from the costa before and beyond the middle, and a third at three-fourths stronger and continued to the apex. There is a semi-oval fuscous blotch, mixed with dark fuscous, extending along the dorsum from the base to three-fourths, reaching more than halfway across the wing. There is sometimes a fine dark fuscous longitudinal dash in the disc beyond the middle and there is some dark fuscous suffusion towards the tornus. The hindwings are whitish fuscous, becoming fuscous posteriorly.
