= Epibrontis pallacopa =

Scientific classification
- Kingdom: Animalia
- Phylum: Arthropoda
- Class: Insecta
- Order: Lepidoptera
- Family: Gelechiidae
- Genus: Epibrontis
- Species: E. pallacopa

Binomial name
- Epibrontis pallacopa Meyrick, 1922

Species of moth

Epibrontis pallacopa is a moth in the family Gelechiidae. It was described by Edward Meyrick in 1922. It is found in Australia, where it has been recorded in Victoria and Queensland.

The wingspan is about 9 mm (0.35 in). The forewings are whitish yellow with a dark grey elongate-triangular blotch extending on the costa from one-fourth to the middle, the base posterior and reaching halfway across the wing. There is a small dark fuscous dash on the costa beyond this and a white irregular line along the apical fourth of the costa edged beneath by a dark fuscous streak. The hindwings are light greyish, in the disc whitish.
