= Hemiarcha metableta =

Scientific classification
- Domain: Eukaryota
- Kingdom: Animalia
- Phylum: Arthropoda
- Class: Insecta
- Order: Lepidoptera
- Family: Gelechiidae
- Genus: Hemiarcha
- Species: H. metableta

Binomial name
- Hemiarcha metableta Turner, 1933

Species of moth

Hemiarcha metableta is a moth in the family Gelechiidae. It was described by Alfred Jefferis Turner in 1933. It is found in Australia, where it has been recorded from Queensland.
