= Hemiarcha caliginosa =

Scientific classification
- Domain: Eukaryota
- Kingdom: Animalia
- Phylum: Arthropoda
- Class: Insecta
- Order: Lepidoptera
- Family: Gelechiidae
- Genus: Hemiarcha
- Species: H. caliginosa

Binomial name
- Hemiarcha caliginosa Turner, 1919

Species of moth

Hemiarcha caliginosa is a moth in the family Gelechiidae. It was described by Alfred Jefferis Turner in 1919. It is found in Australia, where it has been recorded from Queensland.

The wingspan is about 11 mm. The forewings are ochreous-whitish with general but somewhat patchy fuscous suffusion. The discal dots are indistinct, the first before the middle, the plical shortly before the first discal and the second discal at two-thirds. The hindwings are pale-grey.
