= Symbolistis orophota =

Scientific classification
- Kingdom: Animalia
- Phylum: Arthropoda
- Class: Insecta
- Order: Lepidoptera
- Family: Gelechiidae
- Genus: Symbolistis
- Species: S. orophota

Binomial name
- Symbolistis orophota Meyrick, 1904

Species of moth

Symbolistis orophota is a moth in the family Gelechiidae. It was described by Edward Meyrick in 1904. It is found in Australia, where it has been recorded from southern Queensland and New South Wales.

The wingspan is 11–13 mm (0.43–0.51 in). The forewings are pale whitish ochreous, on the dorsal half brownish tinged and sometimes much sprinkled with dark fuscous. The costal edge is ochreous and there is a very elongate wedge-shaped dark fuscous blotch, suffused beneath with yellow ochreous, along the costa from one-third to three-fourths, acute anteriorly. There is also a blackish discal dot before three-fourths, as well as some black scales on the costa towards the apex. The hindwings are grey.
