= Ardozyga cryptosperma =

Scientific classification
- Kingdom: Animalia
- Phylum: Arthropoda
- Clade: Pancrustacea
- Class: Insecta
- Order: Lepidoptera
- Family: Gelechiidae
- Genus: Ardozyga
- Species: A. cryptosperma

Binomial name
- Ardozyga cryptosperma (Meyrick, 1921)

Synonyms
- Protolechia cryptosperma Meyrick, 1921

Species of moth

Ardozyga cryptosperma is a species of moth in the family Gelechiidae. It was described by Edward Meyrick in 1921. It is found in Australia, where it has been recorded from Victoria.

The wingspan is about 23 mm (0.91 in). The forewings are dark fuscous. The stigmata are represented each by a whitish speck surrounded with somewhat darker suffusion, the plical somewhat beyond the first discal. There is an almost marginal series of whitish dots around the posterior third of the costa and termen. The hindwings are grey.
