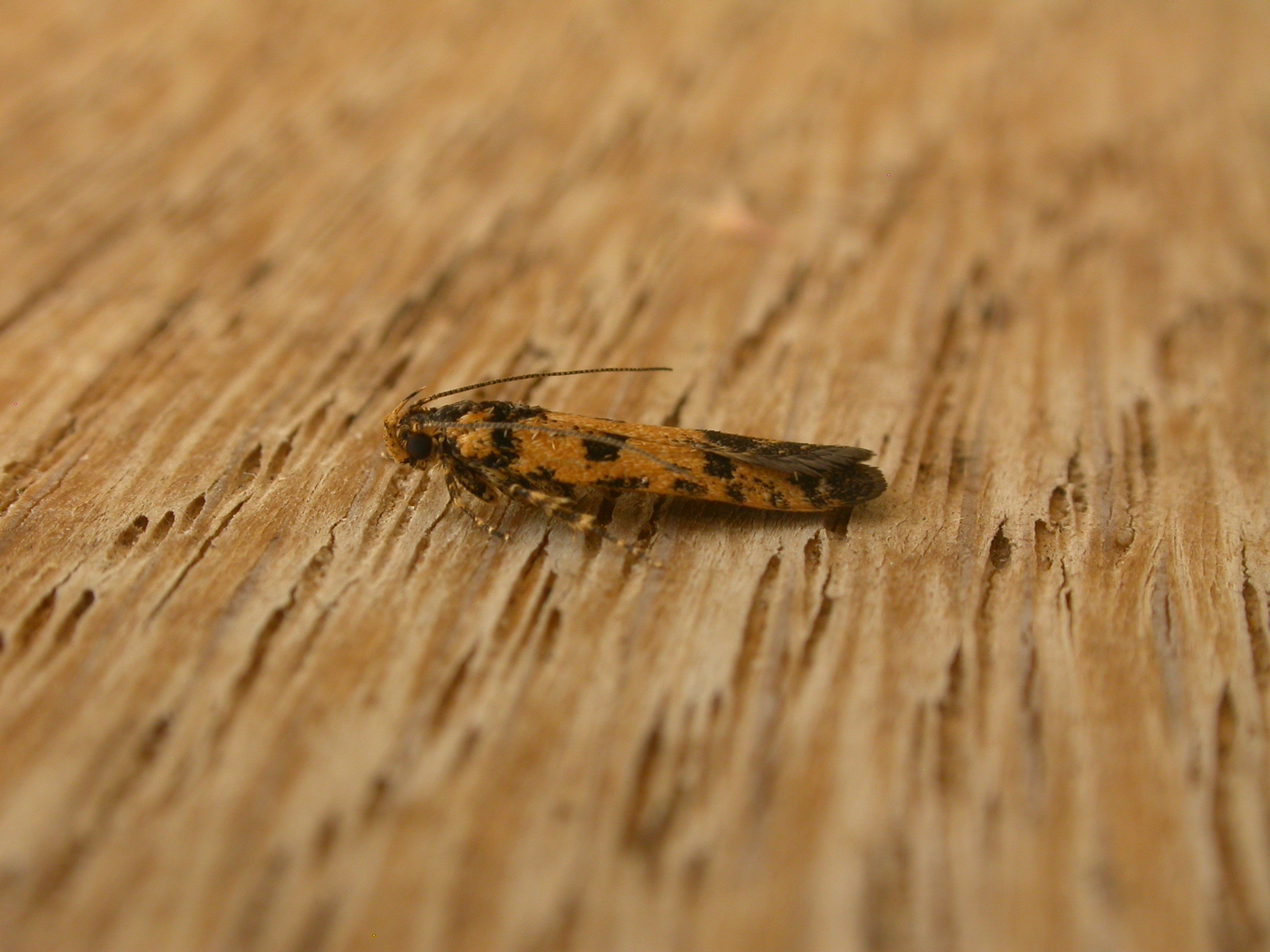

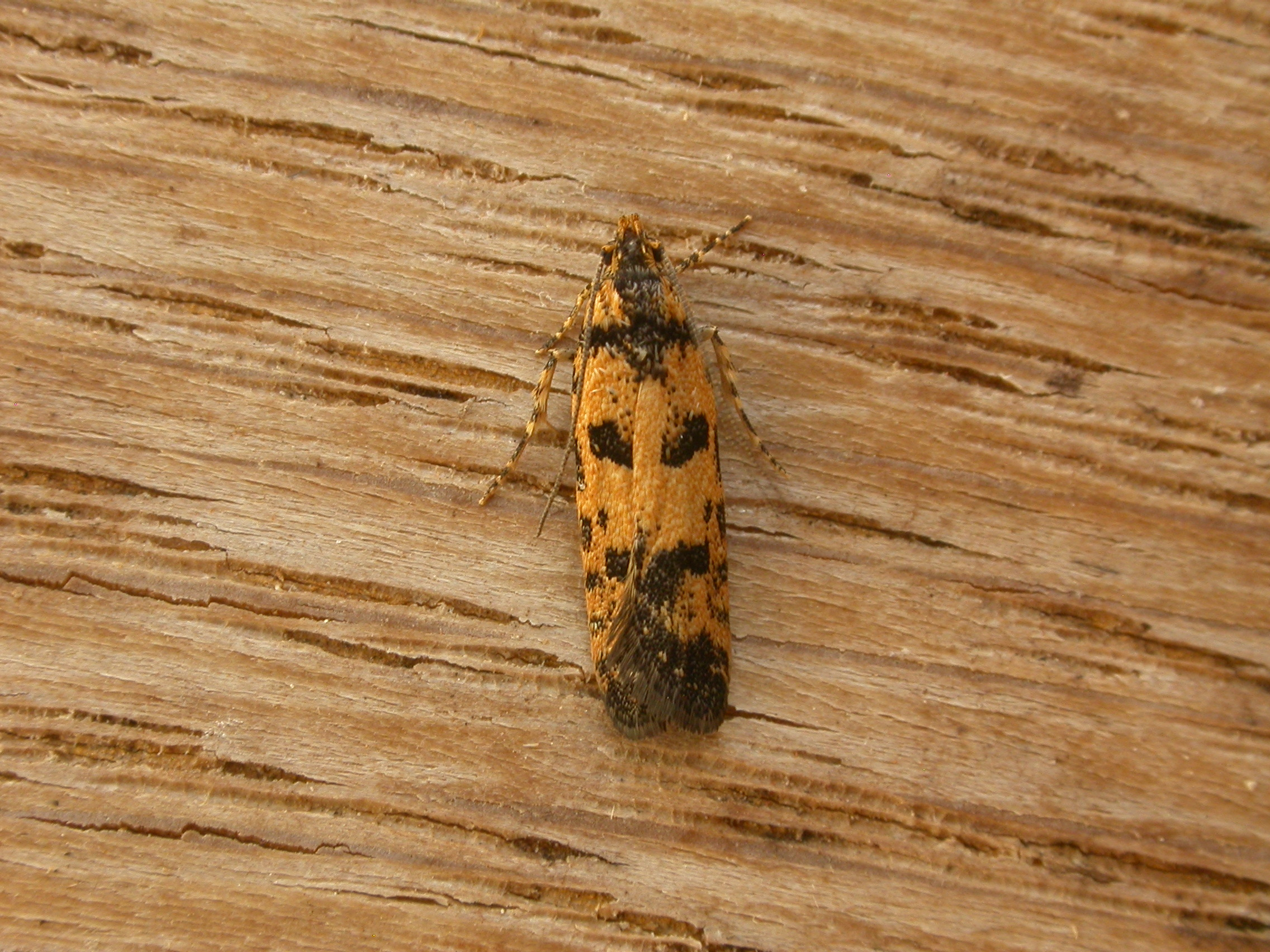

Scientific classification
- Kingdom: Animalia
- Phylum: Arthropoda
- Clade: Pancrustacea
- Class: Insecta
- Order: Lepidoptera
- Family: Gelechiidae
- Genus: Hemiarcha
- Species: H. thermochroa

Binomial name
- Hemiarcha thermochroa (Lower, 1893)

Synonyms
- Gelechia thermochroa Lower, 1893

= Hemiarcha thermochroa =

Species of moth

Hemiarcha thermochroa is a moth of the family Gelechiidae. It is known from Australia, where it has been recorded from the Australian Capital Territory, Victoria and South Australia.
