= Ardozyga voluta =

Scientific classification
- Kingdom: Animalia
- Phylum: Arthropoda
- Clade: Pancrustacea
- Class: Insecta
- Order: Lepidoptera
- Family: Gelechiidae
- Genus: Ardozyga
- Species: A. voluta

Binomial name
- Ardozyga voluta (Meyrick, 1904)

Synonyms
- Protolechia voluta Meyrick, 1904

Species of moth

Ardozyga voluta is a species of moth in the family Gelechiidae. It was described by Edward Meyrick in 1904. It is found in Australia, where it has been recorded from New South Wales.

The wingspan is 10–11 mm (0.39–0.43 in). The forewings are white, somewhat sprinkled with dark fuscous and with the costal edge ochreous-tinged. There are slight dark fuscous costal marks at one-fifth and before the middle and a rounded-triangular dark fuscous blotch darker and more sharply defined on the upper half, extending along the dorsum from one-sixth to beyond the middle, and reaching two-thirds across the wing. There is also a broad rather dark fuscous fascia from three-fourths of the costa to the tornus, enclosing two pale ochreous costal dots, the anterior edge undefined, concave, the posterior edge sharper and straight. A dark fuscous terminal line is extended around the apex. The hindwings are whitish-fuscous, with the terminal half light fuscous.
