= Dichomeris capnites =

Scientific classification
- Kingdom: Animalia
- Phylum: Arthropoda
- Clade: Pancrustacea
- Class: Insecta
- Order: Lepidoptera
- Family: Gelechiidae
- Genus: Dichomeris
- Species: D. capnites

Binomial name
- Dichomeris capnites (Meyrick, 1904)

Synonyms
- Ypsolophus capnites Meyrick, 1904

Species of moth

Dichomeris capnites is a moth in the family Gelechiidae. It is found in Australia, where it has been recorded from Queensland and South Australia.

The wingspan is 16–20 mm (0.63–0.79 in). The forewings are fuscous, indistinctly strigulated with dark fuscous, the costa rosy-tinged on the basal third, with a dark fuscous basal dot and an obscure dark fuscous spot in the disc at one-fourth. The stigmata is rather large, very obscure and dark fuscous, with the plical somewhat obliquely before the first discal. The hindwings are fuscous, darker posteriorly.

The larvae feed on the leaves of Acronychia species.
