= Dichomeris thanatopsis =

Scientific classification
- Kingdom: Animalia
- Phylum: Arthropoda
- Clade: Pancrustacea
- Class: Insecta
- Order: Lepidoptera
- Family: Gelechiidae
- Genus: Dichomeris
- Species: D. thanatopsis

Binomial name
- Dichomeris thanatopsis (Lower, 1901)

Synonyms
- Ypsolophus thanatopsis Lower, 1901; Macrozancla mendica Turner, 1919

Species of moth

Dichomeris thanatopsis is a moth in the family Gelechiidae. It was described by Oswald Bertram Lower in 1901. It is found in Australia, where it has been recorded from Queensland.

The wingspan is about 15 mm. The forewings are whitish grey with some minute fuscous dots near the base beneath the costa, and above and beneath the fold. There is a dot on the fold before the middle, other discal dots are obsolete, but there is a dot on the tornus and a few fuscous scales before the termen. The hindwings are dark grey.
