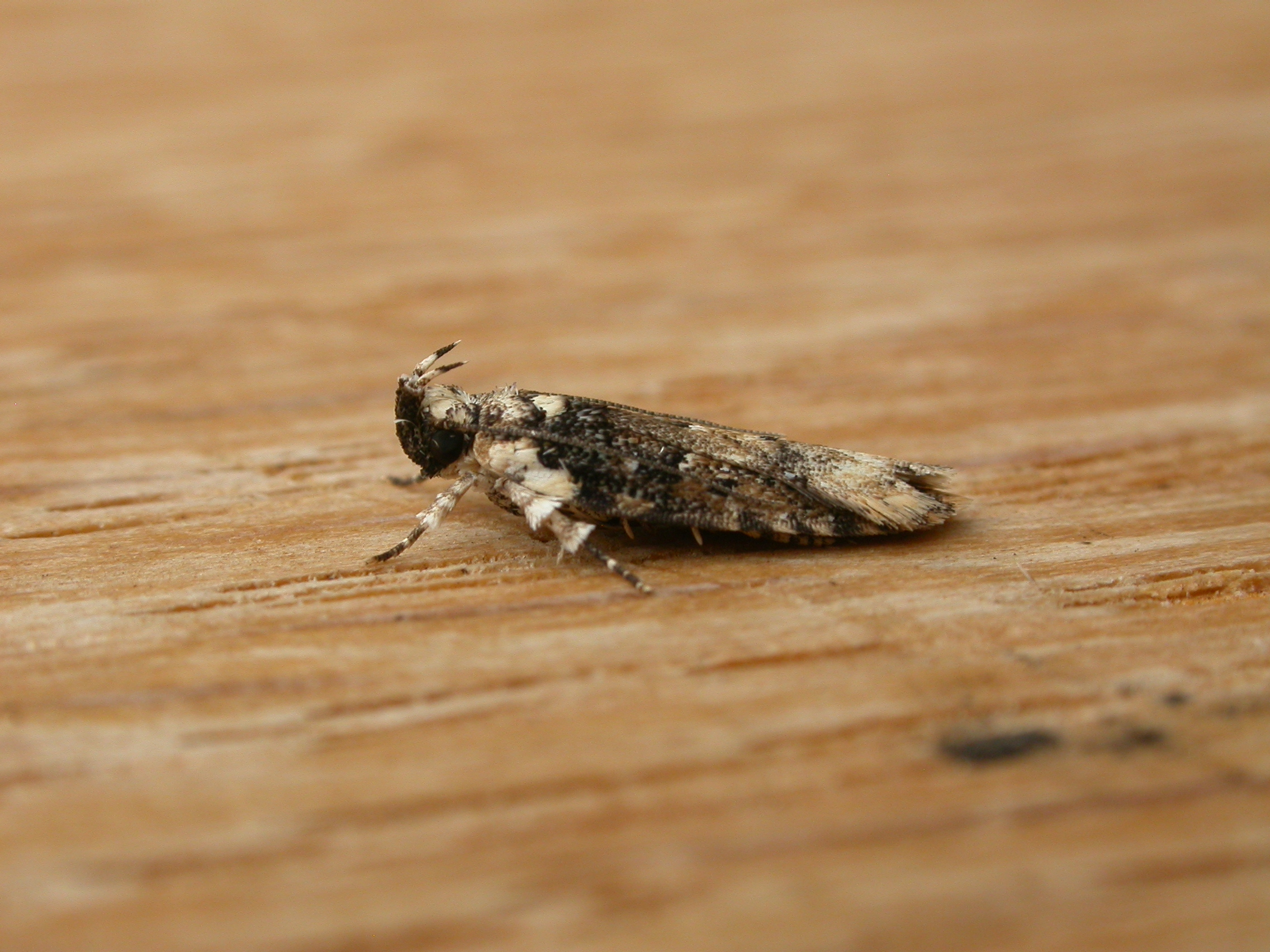
- Aranda, Australian Capital Territory

Scientific classification
- Kingdom: Animalia
- Phylum: Arthropoda
- Clade: Pancrustacea
- Class: Insecta
- Order: Lepidoptera
- Family: Gelechiidae
- Genus: Ardozyga
- Species: A. sodalisella

Binomial name
- Ardozyga sodalisella (Walker, 1864)

Synonyms
- Gelechia sodalisella Walker, 1864; Protolechia sodalisella; Protolechia sodalella Meyrick, 1904; Protolechia selenia Meyrick, 1904

= Ardozyga sodalisella =

Species of moth

Ardozyga sodalisella is a species of moth in the family Gelechiidae. It was described by Francis Walker in 1864. It is found in Australia, where it has been recorded from Queensland and New South Wales.

The wingspan is about 12 mm. The forewings are whitish fuscous, densely irrorated (sprinkled) with dark fuscous and with a slender ochreous-whitish costal streak from the base to two-fifths, extended round base to one-sixth of the dorsum, marked with dark fuscous dots at the base and one-fifth of the costa and near the base of the dorsum. There are several ochreous-white dots on the costa in the middle and posteriorly and some raised subdorsal scales at one-fourth. The stigmata are dark fuscous, partially edged with white and with some whitish suffusion between them, the plical very obliquely beyond the first discal, an additional dot between and above the first and second discal, and another beneath the second discal. There is a subterminal fascia of whitish-ochreous suffusion, as well as some white terminal dots. The hindwings are whitish ochreous, the apical two-fifths and termen suffused with fuscous, darker posteriorly.
