= Hemiarcha bleptodes =

Scientific classification
- Domain: Eukaryota
- Kingdom: Animalia
- Phylum: Arthropoda
- Class: Insecta
- Order: Lepidoptera
- Family: Gelechiidae
- Genus: Hemiarcha
- Species: H. bleptodes

Binomial name
- Hemiarcha bleptodes Turner, 1919

Species of moth

Hemiarcha bleptodes is a moth in the family Gelechiidae. It was described by Alfred Jefferis Turner in 1919. It is found in Australia, where it has been recorded from Queensland and New South Wales.

The wingspan is 12–14 mm. The forewings are blackish suffused and irrorated with white and with white markings. There are six dots on the costa, the three basal rather elongate and more or less produced into the disc. There is an oblique fascia from one-third of the costa to the mid-dorsum, its anterior edge twice indented, the posterior edge less defined. A postmedian central discal spot is divided by a narrow transverse septum and there is an ill-defined narrow subterminal fascia, as well as a slender interrupted submarginal line. The hindwings are pale-grey.
