= Dichomeris melanophylla =

Scientific classification
- Domain: Eukaryota
- Kingdom: Animalia
- Phylum: Arthropoda
- Class: Insecta
- Order: Lepidoptera
- Family: Gelechiidae
- Genus: Dichomeris
- Species: D. melanophylla

Binomial name
- Dichomeris melanophylla (Turner, 1919)

Synonyms
- Euryzancla melanophylla Turner, 1919

Species of moth

Dichomeris melanophylla is a moth in the family Gelechiidae. It was described by Alfred Jefferis Turner in 1919. It is found in Australia, where it has been recorded from Queensland.

The wingspan is about 13 mm (0.51 in). The forewings are blackish-fuscous with obscure blackish dots. There is a median spot at one-fifth extending on both sides of the fold. There is a median dot at two-fifths, shortly preceded by a dot nearer the costa, and by another on the fold, and another median dot at three-fifths. The terminal edge is blackish. The hindwings are grey.
