= Iulota triglossa =

Scientific classification
- Domain: Eukaryota
- Kingdom: Animalia
- Phylum: Arthropoda
- Class: Insecta
- Order: Lepidoptera
- Family: Gelechiidae
- Genus: Iulota
- Species: I. triglossa

Binomial name
- Iulota triglossa Meyrick, 1904

Species of moth

Iulota triglossa is a moth of the family Gelechiidae. It was described by Edward Meyrick in 1904. It is found in Australia, where it has been recorded from Tasmania.

The wingspan is 14–15 mm (0.55–0.59 in). The forewings are golden ochreous yellow with a whitish-pink costal streak mixed with fuscous and with a narrow blackish median longitudinal streak from the base to the apex, the upper edge sharply defined, straight, indented before one-fourth, margined with a streak of white suffusion, the lower edge suffused with golden brown. The dorsal area is broadly suffused with pale pink sprinkled with fuscous. The hindwings are light grey.
