= Ardozyga phasianis =

Scientific classification
- Kingdom: Animalia
- Phylum: Arthropoda
- Clade: Pancrustacea
- Class: Insecta
- Order: Lepidoptera
- Family: Gelechiidae
- Genus: Ardozyga
- Species: A. phasianis

Binomial name
- Ardozyga phasianis (Meyrick, 1904)

Synonyms
- Protolechia phasianis Meyrick, 1904

Species of moth

Ardozyga phasianis is a species of moth in the family Gelechiidae. It was described by Edward Meyrick in 1904. It is found in Australia, where it has been recorded from New South Wales, Victoria and Tasmania.

The wingspan is 14–17 mm (0.55–0.67 in). The forewings are light fuscous, partially tinged with reddish-ochreous, mixed with dark fuscous, and sprinkled with blackish. There is a moderate reddish-ochreous streak along the costa from the base to the middle and a small dark fuscous costal spot at the base, and another near it. The stigmata are dark fuscous, obscure, the plical obliquely beyond the first discal, edged posteriorly with a spot of reddish-ochreous suffusion, an additional dark fuscous dot between and above the discal stigmata, and another below the second discal. There is a series of dark fuscous spots along the posterior half of the costa, separated by reddish-ochreous interspaces and a terminal series of pale reddish-ochreous dots, preceded by obscure dark fuscous spots. The hindwings are pale grey.
