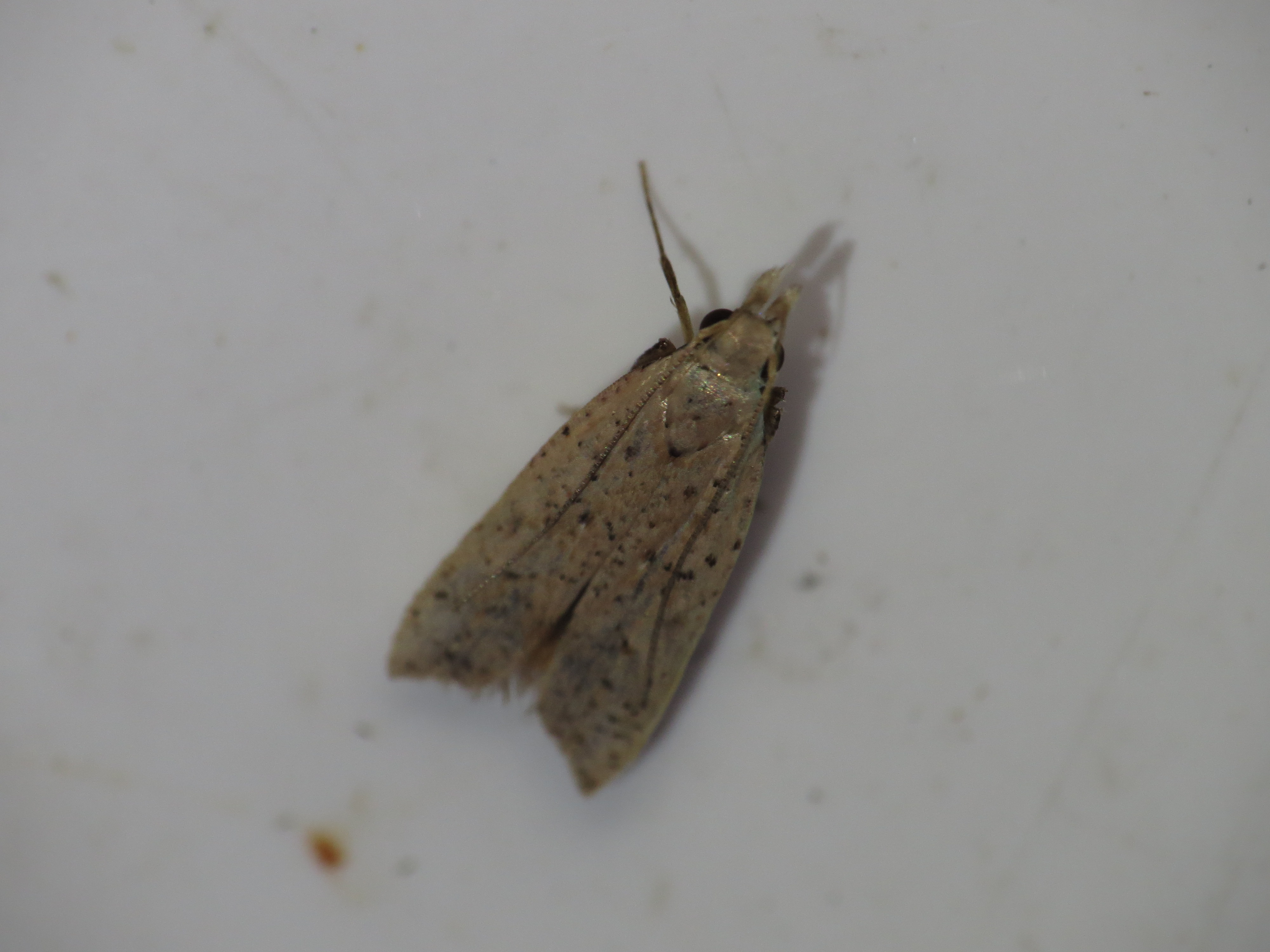

Scientific classification
- Kingdom: Animalia
- Phylum: Arthropoda
- Class: Insecta
- Order: Lepidoptera
- Family: Gelechiidae
- Genus: Dichomeris
- Species: D. achlyodes

Binomial name
- Dichomeris achlyodes (Meyrick, 1904)

Synonyms
- Ypsolophus achlyodes Meyrick, 1904; Euryzancla polyommata Turner, 1919

= Dichomeris achlyodes =

Species of moth

Dichomeris achlyodes is a moth in the family Gelechiidae. It was described by Edward Meyrick in 1904. It is found in Australia, where it has been recorded from New South Wales.

The wingspan is about 14 mm (0.55 in). The forewings are grey with conspicuous blackish dots and a larger median dot at one-fifth, preceded by a smaller dot beneath the fold, a small median dot at two-fifths, preceded by a larger dot on the fold, a dot above the middle, and a median dot at three-fifths, a dot on the tornus, another between this and third median dot, and sometimes a dot preceding this last. There is a series of dots around the apex and on the termen. The hindwings are grey.
