= Ardozyga pelogenes =

Scientific classification
- Kingdom: Animalia
- Phylum: Arthropoda
- Clade: Pancrustacea
- Class: Insecta
- Order: Lepidoptera
- Family: Gelechiidae
- Genus: Ardozyga
- Species: A. pelogenes

Binomial name
- Ardozyga pelogenes (Meyrick, 1906)

Synonyms
- Eutorna pelogenes Meyrick, 1906; Phyzanica tapinopa Turner, 1917

Species of moth

Ardozyga pelogenes is a species of moth in the family Gelechiidae. It was described by Edward Meyrick in 1906. It is found in Australia, where it has been recorded from Victoria and Queensland.

The wingspan is 12–13 mm (0.47–0.51 in). The forewings are pale-fuscous finely irrorated with dark-fuscous and with dark-fuscous markings, often indistinct. There is a discal dot at one-fourth, a second beyond it on the fold, a third in the disc beyond the middle, and a fourth immediately beneath and beyond the third, sometimes confluent with it. There is also a submarginal series of dots around the apex and termen. The hindwings are pale-grey.
