= Dichomeris zygophorus =

Scientific classification
- Kingdom: Animalia
- Phylum: Arthropoda
- Class: Insecta
- Order: Lepidoptera
- Family: Gelechiidae
- Genus: Dichomeris
- Species: D. zygophorus

Binomial name
- Dichomeris zygophorus (Meyrick, 1904)

Synonyms
- Ypsolophus zygophorus Meyrick, 1904

Species of moth

Dichomeris zygophorus is a moth in the family Gelechiidae. It was described by Edward Meyrick in 1904. It is found in Australia, where it has been recorded from Queensland.

The wingspan is 11–12 mm (0.43–0.47 in). The forewings are pale fuscous, mixed with whitish and sprinkled with dark fuscous, wholly suffused with white towards the costa. There is a dark fuscous dot beneath the costa at one-fifth and a very elongate subtriangular deep ferruginous patch mixed with dark fuscous along the costa from one-fourth to five-sixths, cut by a fine whitish oblique mark at three-fourths. The stigmata is dark fuscous sometimes indistinct, the discal near together, the plical obliquely before the first discal. Sometimes, there is an additional dot obliquely beneath and before the second discal and there is a ferruginous mark around the apex, edged by a black terminal line. The hindwings are fuscous, paler and thinly scaled anteriorly.
