= Ardozyga thanatodes =

Scientific classification
- Kingdom: Animalia
- Phylum: Arthropoda
- Clade: Pancrustacea
- Class: Insecta
- Order: Lepidoptera
- Family: Gelechiidae
- Genus: Ardozyga
- Species: A. thanatodes

Binomial name
- Ardozyga thanatodes (Lower, 1893)

Synonyms
- Gelechia thanatodes Lower, 1893; Prodosiarcha thanatodes

Species of moth

Ardozyga thanatodes is a species of moth in the family Gelechiidae. It was described by Oswald Bertram Lower in 1893. It is found in Australia, where it has been recorded from South Australia.

The wingspan is about 13 mm (0.51 in). The forewings are dark fuscous, finely irrorated (sprinkled) with whitish and with a spot on the costa at one-fourth, as well as a straight oblique fascia from before the middle of the costa to before the tornus, and an angulated subterminal series of spots very close to the posterior portion of the costa and termen dark fuscous, undefined and often indistinct. The hindwings are dark fuscous.
