= Ardozyga sarisias =

Scientific classification
- Kingdom: Animalia
- Phylum: Arthropoda
- Clade: Pancrustacea
- Class: Insecta
- Order: Lepidoptera
- Family: Gelechiidae
- Genus: Ardozyga
- Species: A. sarisias

Binomial name
- Ardozyga sarisias (Meyrick, 1904)

Synonyms
- Protolechia sarisias Meyrick, 1904

Species of moth

Ardozyga sarisias is a species of moth in the family Gelechiidae. It was described by Edward Meyrick in 1904. It is found in Australia, where it has been recorded from southern Queensland.

The wingspan is about 11 mm (0.43 in). The forewings are pale bronzy-fuscous with the costa narrowly white from the base to beyond the middle and with a strong white longitudinal streak from the base above the middle to four-fifths of the costa, the upper edge projecting to touch the costal streak before and beyond the middle, otherwise edged with blackish-fuscous, the lower edge margined with blackish-fuscous suffusion on the posterior half. There is a blackish-fuscous streak along the fold from the base almost to the tornus and a moderate cloudy white subdorsal streak from the dorsum near the base to the tornus, as well as a white subterminal streak from above the tornus to the apex, connected with the termen by two fine branches margined with blackish-fuscous dashes. The hindwings are whitish-grey.
