= Dichomeris chalcophaea =

Scientific classification
- Kingdom: Animalia
- Phylum: Arthropoda
- Class: Insecta
- Order: Lepidoptera
- Family: Gelechiidae
- Genus: Dichomeris
- Species: D. chalcophaea

Binomial name
- Dichomeris chalcophaea Meyrick, 1921

Species of moth

Dichomeris chalcophaea is a moth in the family Gelechiidae. It was described by Edward Meyrick in 1921. It is found in Australia, where it has been recorded from Queensland.

The wingspan is 10–11 mm (0.39–0.43 in). The forewings are rather dark bronzy fuscous, obscurely irrorated (sprinkled) with grey whitish. The stigmata are cloudy, obscure, dark fuscous, the discal approximated, the second transverse, the plical rather obliquely before the first discal. There is a distinct angulated thick dark coppery-fuscous line from three-fourths of the costa to the tornus, edged anteriorly by a faint line of whitish irroration. The apical edge is coppery bronze. The hindwings are fuscous.
