= Iulota ischnora =

Scientific classification
- Domain: Eukaryota
- Kingdom: Animalia
- Phylum: Arthropoda
- Class: Insecta
- Order: Lepidoptera
- Family: Gelechiidae
- Genus: Iulota
- Species: I. ischnora

Binomial name
- Iulota ischnora Turner, 1919

Species of moth

Iulota ischnora is a moth of the family Gelechiidae. It was described by Alfred Jefferis Turner in 1919. It is found in Australia, where it has been recorded from Queensland.

The wingspan is about 10 mm. The forewings are ochreous-whitish irrorated with dark-fuscous, which tends to be arranged in longitudinal streaks. The first discal is obsolete. The other stigmata are indicated, with an additional dot above the middle and with the termen irrorated with dark fuscous. The hindwings are whitish.
