= Sphaleractis eurysema =

Scientific classification
- Kingdom: Animalia
- Phylum: Arthropoda
- Class: Insecta
- Order: Lepidoptera
- Family: Gelechiidae
- Genus: Sphaleractis
- Species: S. eurysema

Binomial name
- Sphaleractis eurysema Meyrick, 1904

Species of moth

Sphaleractis eurysema is a moth in the family Gelechiidae. It was described by Edward Meyrick in 1904. It is found in Australia, where it has been recorded from New South Wales.

The wingspan is 10–12 mm (0.39–0.47 in). The forewings are light fuscous, darker above the middle and with a broad white costal streak from the base to five-sixths, strewn with black specks, the costal edge suffusedly fuscous from the middle to three-fourths. The stigmata are rather large, distinct and blackish, with the plical rather obliquely beyond the first discal, an additional dot midway between the second discal and dorsum. The hindwings are whitish grey.
