= Iulota phauloptila =

Scientific classification
- Domain: Eukaryota
- Kingdom: Animalia
- Phylum: Arthropoda
- Class: Insecta
- Order: Lepidoptera
- Family: Gelechiidae
- Genus: Iulota
- Species: I. phauloptila

Binomial name
- Iulota phauloptila Turner, 1919

Species of moth

Iulota phauloptila is a moth of the family Gelechiidae. It was described by Alfred Jefferis Turner in 1919. It is found in Australia, where it has been recorded from New South Wales.

The wingspan is 11–14 mm. The forewings are whitish with scanty pale fuscous irroration and with the discal dots obsolete. The hindwings are whitish.
