= Ardozyga scytina =

Scientific classification
- Kingdom: Animalia
- Phylum: Arthropoda
- Clade: Pancrustacea
- Class: Insecta
- Order: Lepidoptera
- Family: Gelechiidae
- Genus: Ardozyga
- Species: A. scytina

Binomial name
- Ardozyga scytina (Meyrick, 1904)

Synonyms
- Protolechia scytina Meyrick, 1904

Species of moth

Ardozyga scytina is a species of moth in the family Gelechiidae. It was described by Edward Meyrick in 1904. It is found in Australia, where it has been recorded from New South Wales and South Australia.

The wingspan is 14–16 mm (0.55–0.63 in). The forewings are ochreous, slightly reddish-tinged. The discal stigmata are small, blackish and there are some blackish scales on the termen. The hindwings are pale grey.
