= Iulota ithyxyla =

Scientific classification
- Domain: Eukaryota
- Kingdom: Animalia
- Phylum: Arthropoda
- Class: Insecta
- Order: Lepidoptera
- Family: Gelechiidae
- Genus: Iulota
- Species: I. ithyxyla

Binomial name
- Iulota ithyxyla Meyrick, 1904

Species of moth

Iulota ithyxyla is a moth of the family Gelechiidae. It was described by Edward Meyrick in 1904. It is found in Australia, where it has been recorded from Western Australia.

The wingspan is 11–13 mm (0.43–0.51 in). The forewings are bright deep golden bronze with a broad white costal streak from the base almost to the apex, faintly purplish tinged, edged beneath with some dark fuscous scales, the anterior half including a light brassy-yellow streak. There is a suffused white dorsal streak from near the base to near the tornus. The hindwings are pale grey.
