= Dichomeris xuthochyta =

Scientific classification
- Domain: Eukaryota
- Kingdom: Animalia
- Phylum: Arthropoda
- Class: Insecta
- Order: Lepidoptera
- Family: Gelechiidae
- Genus: Dichomeris
- Species: D. xuthochyta

Binomial name
- Dichomeris xuthochyta Turner, 1919

Species of moth

Dichomeris xuthochyta is a moth in the family Gelechiidae. It was described by Alfred Jefferis Turner in 1919. It is found in Australia, where it has been recorded from Queensland.

The wingspan is about 10 mm (0.39 in). The forewings are fuscous with the discal dots very obscurely darker, the plical beyond the first discal. The hindwings are fuscous with a large tornal ochreous blotch extending from mid-dorsum to mid-termen.
