= Iulota =

Scientific classification
- Domain: Eukaryota
- Kingdom: Animalia
- Phylum: Arthropoda
- Class: Insecta
- Order: Lepidoptera
- Family: Gelechiidae
- Subfamily: Anomologinae
- Genus: Iulota; Meyrick, 1904

Genus of moths

Iulota is a genus of moths in the family Gelechiidae.

== Species ==
- Iulota epispila (Lower, 1897)
- Iulota bacillum (Turner, 1927)
- Iulota ischnora Turner, 1919
- Iulota ithyxyla Meyrick, 1904
- Iulota ochropolia Turner, 1939
- Iulota phauloptila Turner, 1919
- Iulota triglossa Meyrick, 1904
