= Dichomeris holomela =

Scientific classification
- Domain: Eukaryota
- Kingdom: Animalia
- Phylum: Arthropoda
- Class: Insecta
- Order: Lepidoptera
- Family: Gelechiidae
- Genus: Dichomeris
- Species: D. holomela

Binomial name
- Dichomeris holomela (Lower, 1897)

Synonyms
- Anarsia holomela Lower, 1897; Dichomeris holomelas; Ypsolophus holomelas

Species of moth

Dichomeris holomela is a moth in the family Gelechiidae. It was described by Oswald Bertram Lower in 1897. It is found in Australia, where it has been recorded from New South Wales, Western Australia, the Northern Territory and Queensland.

The wingspan is about 14 mm (0.55 in). The forewings are dark fuscous, faintly purplish tinged. The stigmata are faintly darker, hardly traceable. The hindwings are fuscous, darker posteriorly.
