= Australiopalpa commoni =

Scientific classification
- Kingdom: Animalia
- Phylum: Arthropoda
- Clade: Pancrustacea
- Class: Insecta
- Order: Lepidoptera
- Family: Gelechiidae
- Genus: Australiopalpa
- Species: A. commoni

Binomial name
- Australiopalpa commoni Povolný, 1974

Species of moth

Australiopalpa commoni is a species of moth in the family Gelechiidae. It was described by Povolný in 1974. It is found in Australia, where it has been recorded from New South Wales.
