= Ardozyga chalazodes =

Scientific classification
- Kingdom: Animalia
- Phylum: Arthropoda
- Clade: Pancrustacea
- Class: Insecta
- Order: Lepidoptera
- Family: Gelechiidae
- Genus: Ardozyga
- Species: A. chalazodes

Binomial name
- Ardozyga chalazodes (Turner, 1919)

Synonyms
- Protolechia chalazodes Turner, 1919

Species of moth

Ardozyga chalazodes is a species of moth in the family Gelechiidae. It was described by Alfred Jefferis Turner in 1919. It is found in Australia, where it has been recorded from Queensland.

The wingspan is about 14 mm (0.55 in). The forewings are brown irregularly mixed with ochreous-whitish, towards the termen reddish brown. There are fuscous dots on the costa at one-sixth and one-third and a fine median longitudinal fuscous line from one-third to two-thirds, a similar line from two-thirds of the costa to the apex. The hindwings are dark-fuscous densely irrorated with whitish.
