= Dichomeris dryinodes =

Scientific classification
- Domain: Eukaryota
- Kingdom: Animalia
- Phylum: Arthropoda
- Class: Insecta
- Order: Lepidoptera
- Family: Gelechiidae
- Genus: Dichomeris
- Species: D. dryinodes

Binomial name
- Dichomeris dryinodes (Lower, 1897)

Synonyms
- Ypsolophus dryinodes Lower, 1897

Species of moth

Dichomeris dryinodes is a moth in the family Gelechiidae. It was described by Oswald Bertram Lower in 1897. It is found in Australia, where it has been recorded from Queensland.

The wingspan is about 25 mm. The forewings are fuscous, with minute, darker-fuscous dots, more pronounced along the costa and veins towards the hindmargin, where they appear in longitudinal rows. There are also three oblique, transverse rows of similar spots from one-fourth of the costa to about one-fourth of the inner margin, one from the middle of the costa to before the middle of the inner margin and another from near three-fourths of the costa to beyond the middle of the inner margin. The hindwings are fuscous.
