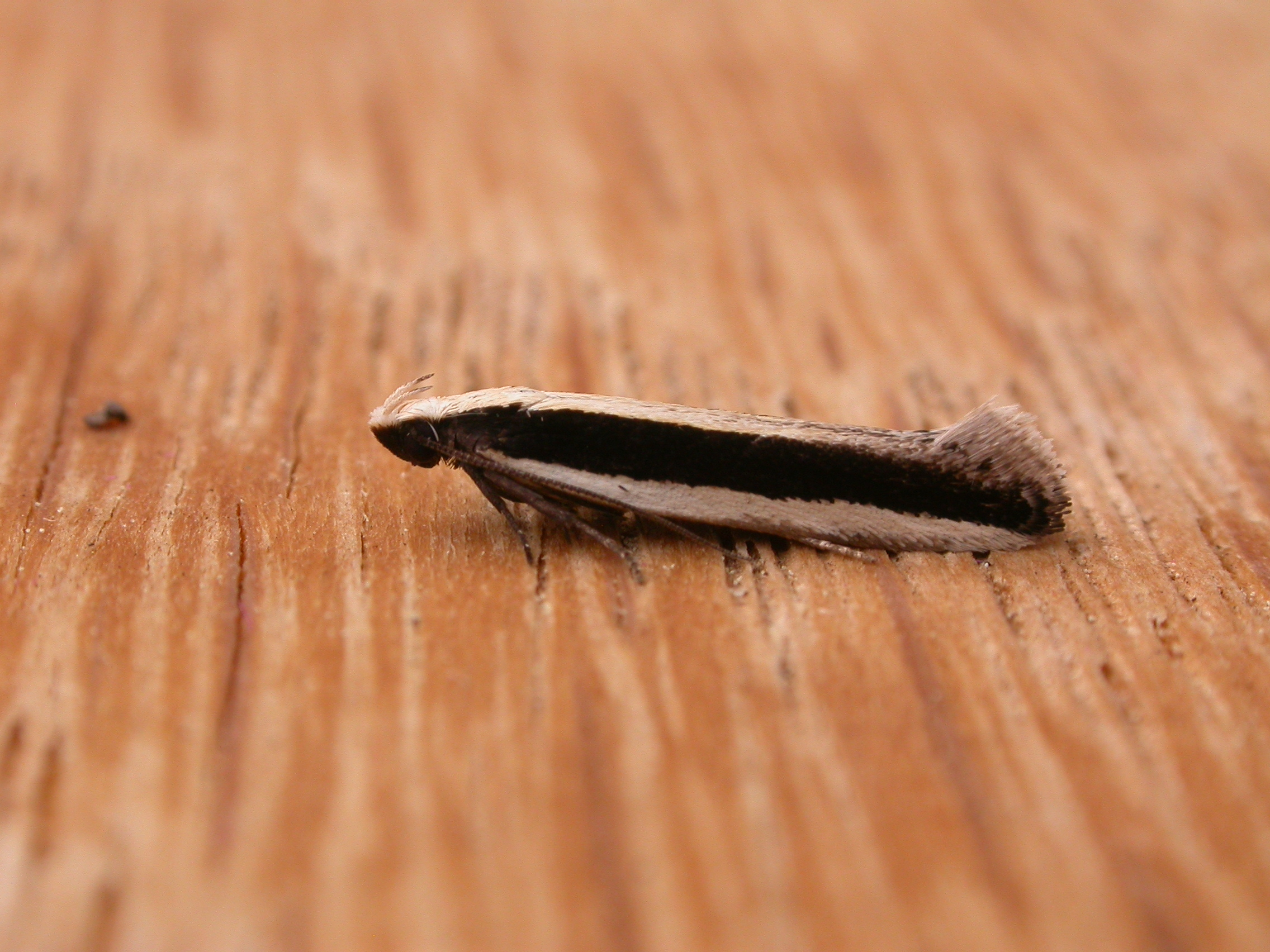

Scientific classification
- Domain: Eukaryota
- Kingdom: Animalia
- Phylum: Arthropoda
- Class: Insecta
- Order: Lepidoptera
- Family: Gelechiidae
- Genus: Macrenches
- Species: M. clerica

Binomial name
- Macrenches clerica (Rosenstock, 1885)

Synonyms
- Gelechia clerica Rosenstock, 1885

= Macrenches clerica =

Species of moth

Macrenches clerica is a moth of the family Gelechiidae. It is known from Australia, where it has been recorded from Tasmania and south-eastern mainland Australia.

The wingspan is 15–18 mm (0.59–0.71 in). The forewings are dark bronzy-fuscous with a broad ochreous-whitish costal streak from the base to near the apex, mixed with light fuscous towards the costa from the middle to near the extremity. There is a similar dorsal streak from near the base to the termen near the apex, more or less suffused with fuscous posteriorly, sometimes tinged with brassy-yellowish on the upper edge anteriorly. The hindwings are grey or pale grey, paler anteriorly.
