= Pancoenia periphora =

Scientific classification
- Kingdom: Animalia
- Phylum: Arthropoda
- Class: Insecta
- Order: Lepidoptera
- Family: Gelechiidae
- Genus: Pancoenia
- Species: P. periphora

Binomial name
- Pancoenia periphora Meyrick, 1904

Species of moth

Pancoenia periphora is a moth in the family Gelechiidae. It was described by Edward Meyrick in 1904. It is found in Australia, where it has been recorded from New South Wales.

The wingspan is 9–10 mm (0.35–0.39 in). The forewings are pale greyish ochreous, irregularly mixed with fuscous and dark fuscous, especially on the margins and with a dark fuscous dot below the costa near the base. The stigmata are rather large, dark fuscous, with the plical obliquely before the first discal, the second discal confluent with an upright mark of dark fuscous suffusion from the tornus. The hindwings are grey, paler towards the base.
