= Hemiarcha tetrasticta =

Scientific classification
- Domain: Eukaryota
- Kingdom: Animalia
- Phylum: Arthropoda
- Class: Insecta
- Order: Lepidoptera
- Family: Gelechiidae
- Genus: Hemiarcha
- Species: H. tetrasticta

Binomial name
- Hemiarcha tetrasticta Turner, 1919

Species of moth

Hemiarcha tetrasticta is a moth in the family Gelechiidae. It was described by Alfred Jefferis Turner in 1919. It is found in Australia, where it has been recorded from Queensland.

The wingspan is 10–12 mm. The forewings are whitish-brown more or less suffused with fuscous and with four conspicuous dark-fuscous spots, a median spot at one-sixth, the first discal at one-third, the plical before the first discal and the second discal before two-thirds. The hindwings are pale-grey.
