= Craspedotis diasticha =

Scientific classification
- Domain: Eukaryota
- Kingdom: Animalia
- Phylum: Arthropoda
- Class: Insecta
- Order: Lepidoptera
- Family: Gelechiidae
- Genus: Craspedotis
- Species: C. diasticha

Binomial name
- Craspedotis diasticha Turner, 1919

Species of moth

Craspedotis diasticha is a moth in the family Gelechiidae. It was first discovered by Turner in 1919. It is found in Australia, New South Wales.

== Description ==
(For key terms used see Glossary of Entomology Terms)

The wingspan is approximately 13 mm. The forewings are whitish-grey with a broad dark streak in their centre from the base to the apex, giving off a short branch along the fold and a dark terminal line from the apex to a large tornal spot nearly confluent with the centre streak. The hindwings are whitish-grey.
