= Ardozyga englypta =

Scientific classification
- Kingdom: Animalia
- Phylum: Arthropoda
- Clade: Pancrustacea
- Class: Insecta
- Order: Lepidoptera
- Family: Gelechiidae
- Genus: Ardozyga
- Species: A. englypta

Binomial name
- Ardozyga englypta (Meyrick, 1904)

Synonyms
- Protolechia englypta Meyrick, 1904

Species of moth

Ardozyga englypta is a species of moth in the family Gelechiidae. It was described by Edward Meyrick in 1904. It is found in Australia, where it has been recorded from Victoria.

The wingspan is about 15 mm (0.59 in). The forewings are pale greyish-ochreous, irrorated with dark brown and sprinkled with white and with four dark fuscous spots on the fold, the first two traversed by a blackish plical line, the second and third connected by a white mark, the fourth tornal. There are also two dark blotches in the disc before and beyond the middle, margined above with irregular white suffusion. An angulated series of undefined dark fuscous marks is found beneath the posterior third of the costa and along the termen. The hindwings are whitish-fuscous, more whitish and thinly scaled anteriorly.
