= Symbolistis argyromitra =

Scientific classification
- Kingdom: Animalia
- Phylum: Arthropoda
- Class: Insecta
- Order: Lepidoptera
- Family: Gelechiidae
- Genus: Symbolistis
- Species: S. argyromitra

Binomial name
- Symbolistis argyromitra Meyrick, 1904

Species of moth

Symbolistis argyromitra is a moth in the family Gelechiidae. It was described by Edward Meyrick in 1904. It is found in Australia, where it has been recorded from New South Wales.

== Characteristics ==
The wingspan is 9–10 mm (0.35–0.39 in). The forewings are whitish, the dorsal half ochreous tinged and more or less sprinkled with dark fuscous. The stigmata are dark fuscous, rather obscure, with the plical obliquely beyond the first discal. There is a wedge-shaped dark fuscous blotch, suffused beneath with yellow ochreous, along the costa from the middle to three-fourths, acute anteriorly. There is also some ochreous suffusion towards the apex, edged on the costa with blackish. The hindwings are grey.
