= Hemiarcha polioleuca =

Scientific classification
- Domain: Eukaryota
- Kingdom: Animalia
- Phylum: Arthropoda
- Class: Insecta
- Order: Lepidoptera
- Family: Gelechiidae
- Genus: Hemiarcha
- Species: H. polioleuca

Binomial name
- Hemiarcha polioleuca Turner, 1919

Species of moth

Hemiarcha polioleuca is a moth in the family Gelechiidae. It was described by Alfred Jefferis Turner in 1919. It is found in Australia, where it has been recorded from Queensland.

The wingspan is about 13 mm. The forewings are pale-grey with the costa suffusedly whitish from the base to three-fourths. The hindwings are whitish.
