= Dichomeris pleuroleuca =

Scientific classification
- Domain: Eukaryota
- Kingdom: Animalia
- Phylum: Arthropoda
- Class: Insecta
- Order: Lepidoptera
- Family: Gelechiidae
- Genus: Dichomeris
- Species: D. pleuroleuca

Binomial name
- Dichomeris pleuroleuca Turner, 1919

Species of moth

Dichomeris pleuroleuca is a moth in the family Gelechiidae. It was described by Alfred Jefferis Turner in 1919. It is found in Australia, where it has been recorded from Queensland.

The wingspan is about 20 mm (0.79 in). The forewings are fuscous with a broad ochreous-whitish the costal streak from the base nearly to the apex, narrowing posteriorly, with a small angular projection on the lower edge at one-thirds. The hindwings are grey-whitish.
