= Decatopseustis xanthastis =

Scientific classification
- Domain: Eukaryota
- Kingdom: Animalia
- Phylum: Arthropoda
- Class: Insecta
- Order: Lepidoptera
- Family: Gelechiidae
- Genus: Decatopseustis
- Species: D. xanthastis

Binomial name
- Decatopseustis xanthastis (Lower, 1896)

Synonyms
- Gelechia xanthastis Lower, 1896

Species of moth

Decatopseustis xanthastis is a moth of the family Gelechiidae. It was described by Oswald Bertram Lower in 1896. It is found in Australia, where it has been recorded from Queensland.

The wingspan is about 10 mm. The forewings are bright yellow, with dark fuscous-purple markings and a broad straight fascia close to the base, with the edges concave. There is a broader straight-edged transverse fascia from three-fourths to just before the anal angle and a moderate hindmarginal band not quite reaching the anal angle, but nearly touching the second fascia at the lower extremity. The hindwings are dark fuscous.
