= Dichomeris acrogypsa =

Scientific classification
- Domain: Eukaryota
- Kingdom: Animalia
- Phylum: Arthropoda
- Class: Insecta
- Order: Lepidoptera
- Family: Gelechiidae
- Genus: Dichomeris
- Species: D. acrogypsa

Binomial name
- Dichomeris acrogypsa Turner, 1919

Species of moth

Dichomeris acrogypsa is a moth in the family Gelechiidae. It was described by Alfred Jefferis Turner in 1919. It is found in Australia, where it has been recorded from Queensland.

The wingspan is about 13 mm (0.51 in). The forewings are fuscous with a slight purple tinge and fine blackish dorsal strigulae. The apical one-fourth is whitish with a few fuscous and blackish scales. The hindwings are grey.
