= Iulota ochropolia =

Scientific classification
- Domain: Eukaryota
- Kingdom: Animalia
- Phylum: Arthropoda
- Class: Insecta
- Order: Lepidoptera
- Family: Gelechiidae
- Genus: Iulota
- Species: I. ochropolia

Binomial name
- Iulota ochropolia Turner, 1939

Species of moth

Iulota ochropolia is a moth of the family Gelechiidae. It was described by Alfred Jefferis Turner in 1939. It is found in Australia, where it has been recorded from Tasmania.

The wingspan is about 12 mm. The forewings are whitish finely sprinkled with pale grey. The hindwings are pale grey.
