= Sphaleractis platyleuca =

Scientific classification
- Domain: Eukaryota
- Kingdom: Animalia
- Phylum: Arthropoda
- Class: Insecta
- Order: Lepidoptera
- Family: Gelechiidae
- Genus: Sphaleractis
- Species: S. platyleuca

Binomial name
- Sphaleractis platyleuca (Lower, 1897)

Synonyms
- Gelechia platyleuca Lower, 1897; Protolechia platyzancla Turner, 1939

Species of moth

Sphaleractis platyleuca is a moth in the family Gelechiidae. It was described by Oswald Bertram Lower in 1897. It is found in Australia, where it has been recorded from Tasmania and New South Wales.

The wingspan is 13–17 mm (0.51–0.67 in). The forewings are bronzy fuscous with a broad white costal streak from the base to five-sixths, thinly strewn with black specks, the costal edge suffusedly fuscous tinged from the middle to three-fourths (except sometimes in females). The stigmata are small, blackish and often indistinct, with the plical rather obliquely beyond the first discal, sometimes an additional dot midway between the second discal and tornus. The hindwings are grey.
