= Dichomeris lutivittata =

Scientific classification
- Kingdom: Animalia
- Phylum: Arthropoda
- Class: Insecta
- Order: Lepidoptera
- Family: Gelechiidae
- Genus: Dichomeris
- Species: D. lutivittata

Binomial name
- Dichomeris lutivittata Meyrick, 1921

Species of moth

Dichomeris lutivittata is a moth in the family Gelechiidae. It was described by Edward Meyrick in 1921. It is found in Australia, where it has been recorded from Queensland.

The wingspan is about 15 mm (0.59 in). The forewings are mixed brownish and dark grey, appearing fuscous, becoming dark fuscous anteriorly, and narrowly along the termen. There is a broad pale greyish-ochreous costal streak from the base to about two-thirds, posteriorly suffused with five or six black specks just beneath the costa and a small black mark at the base. The hindwings are grey.
