= Craspedotis soloeca =

Scientific classification
- Kingdom: Animalia
- Phylum: Arthropoda
- Class: Insecta
- Order: Lepidoptera
- Family: Gelechiidae
- Genus: Craspedotis
- Species: C. soloeca

Binomial name
- Craspedotis soloeca Meyrick, 1904

Species of moth

Craspedotis soloeca is a moth in the family Gelechiidae. It was described by Edward Meyrick in 1904. It is found in Australia, where it has been recorded from New South Wales.

The wingspan is about 11 mm (0.43 in). The forewings are pale fuscous, the costal half and terminal area are suffused with rather dark fuscous. The stigmata are cloudy and dark fuscous, with the plical beneath the first discal, these obscured by a prolongation of the costal suffusion, the second discal distinct. The hindwings are pale grey, thinly scaled and darker grey posteriorly.
