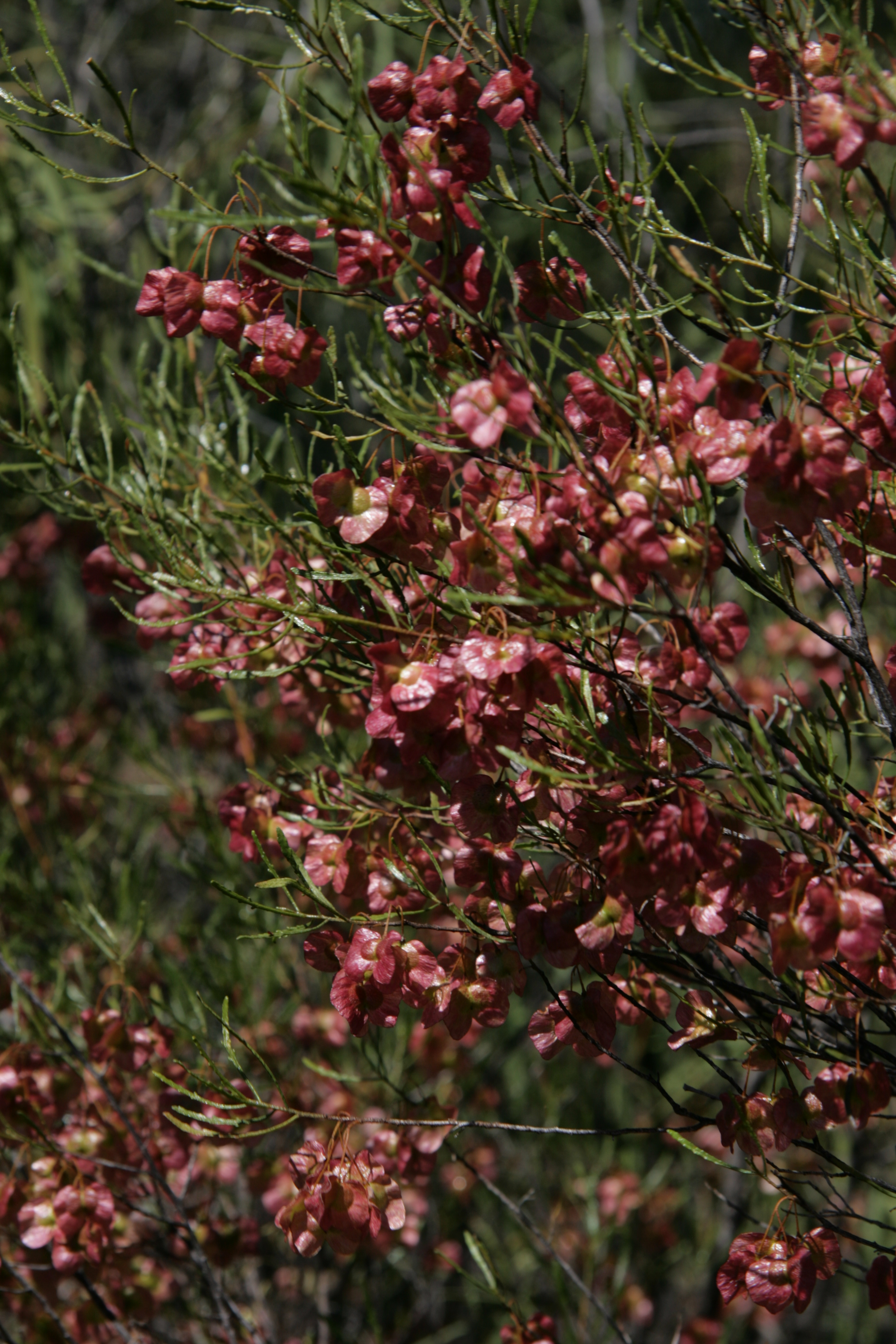

Scientific classification
- Kingdom: Plantae
- Clade: Tracheophytes
- Clade: Angiosperms
- Clade: Eudicots
- Clade: Rosids
- Order: Sapindales
- Family: Sapindaceae
- Genus: Dodonaea
- Species: D. lobulata

Binomial name
- Dodonaea lobulata F.Muell.

= Dodonaea lobulata =

Species of shrub

Dodonaea lobulata, commonly known as bead hopbush, or lobed hop-bush, is a species of flowering plant in the family Sapindaceae and is endemic to southern continental Australia, mostly to inland Western Australia. It is an erect, spreading, dioecious shrub with pinnatifid or lobed leaves, flowers arranged in pairs or in groups of three, with six to eight stamens, and mostly three-angled capsules.

== Description ==
Dodonaea lobulata is a spreading, dioecious shrub that typically grows to a height of 0.5–3 m (1 ft 8 in – 9 ft 10 in). Its leaves are sessile, irregularly pinnatifid, mostly 15–55 mm (0.59–2.17 in) long and 1–2.5 mm (0.039–0.098 in) wide or irregularly lobed with two to twelve elliptic to linear lobes near the end. The flowers are borne in pairs or groups of three, each flower on a pedicel 3–6.5 mm (0.12–0.26 in) long. The three or four sepals are egg-shaped, 1.6–2.7 mm (0.063–0.106 in) long but that fall off as the flowers develop. There are six to eight stamens and the ovary glabrous. Flowering occurs from May to July, and the fruit is a glabrous, usually three-winged, elliptic to broadly egg-shaped capsule 10.5–15 mm (0.41–0.59 in) long and 14–21 mm (0.55–0.83 in) wide, the wings leathery to membranous, 4–7 mm (0.16–0.28 in) wide.

== Taxonomy and naming ==
Dodonaea lobulata was first formally described in 1853 by Ferdinand von Mueller in the journal Linnaea. The specific epithet (lobulata) means 'having small lobes', referring to the leaves.

== Distribution and habitat ==
Bead hopbush grows in arid areas of southern Australia between Leonora and Cape Arid National Park, southern South Australia and western New South Wales between Broken Hill and Cobar, but is absent from the Nullarbor Plain.

== Conservation status ==
Dodonaea lobulata is listed as "not threatened" by the Government of Western Australia Department of Biodiversity, Conservation and Attractions.
