= Dichomeris dysorata =

Scientific classification
- Domain: Eukaryota
- Kingdom: Animalia
- Phylum: Arthropoda
- Class: Insecta
- Order: Lepidoptera
- Family: Gelechiidae
- Genus: Dichomeris
- Species: D. dysorata

Binomial name
- Dichomeris dysorata Turner, 1919

Species of moth

Dichomeris dysorata is a moth in the family Gelechiidae. It was described by Alfred Jefferis Turner in 1919. It is found in Australia, where it has been recorded from New South Wales.

The wingspan is about 20 mm (0.79 in). The forewings are grey with slight fuscous irroration. The stigmata is very obscure, the plical beyond the first discal. There is an additional median dot, and another beneath the second discal. There is a series of blackish dots, one before the apex, one at the apex, and several on the termen. The hindwings are pale-grey.
