= Macrenches eurybatis =

Scientific classification
- Kingdom: Animalia
- Phylum: Arthropoda
- Class: Insecta
- Order: Lepidoptera
- Family: Gelechiidae
- Genus: Macrenches
- Species: M. eurybatis

Binomial name
- Macrenches eurybatis Meyrick, 1904

Species of moth

Macrenches eurybatis is a moth of the family Gelechiidae. It was described by Edward Meyrick in 1904. It is found in Australia, where it has been recorded from Western Australia, the Northern Territory, Queensland and New South Wales.

The wingspan is about 12 mm (0.47 in). The forewings are whitish ochreous, with purplish-silvery reflections and a broad dark bronzy-fuscous median longitudinal streak throughout, edged above by a shining white streak, beneath rather undefined posteriorly. The hindwings are pale grey.
