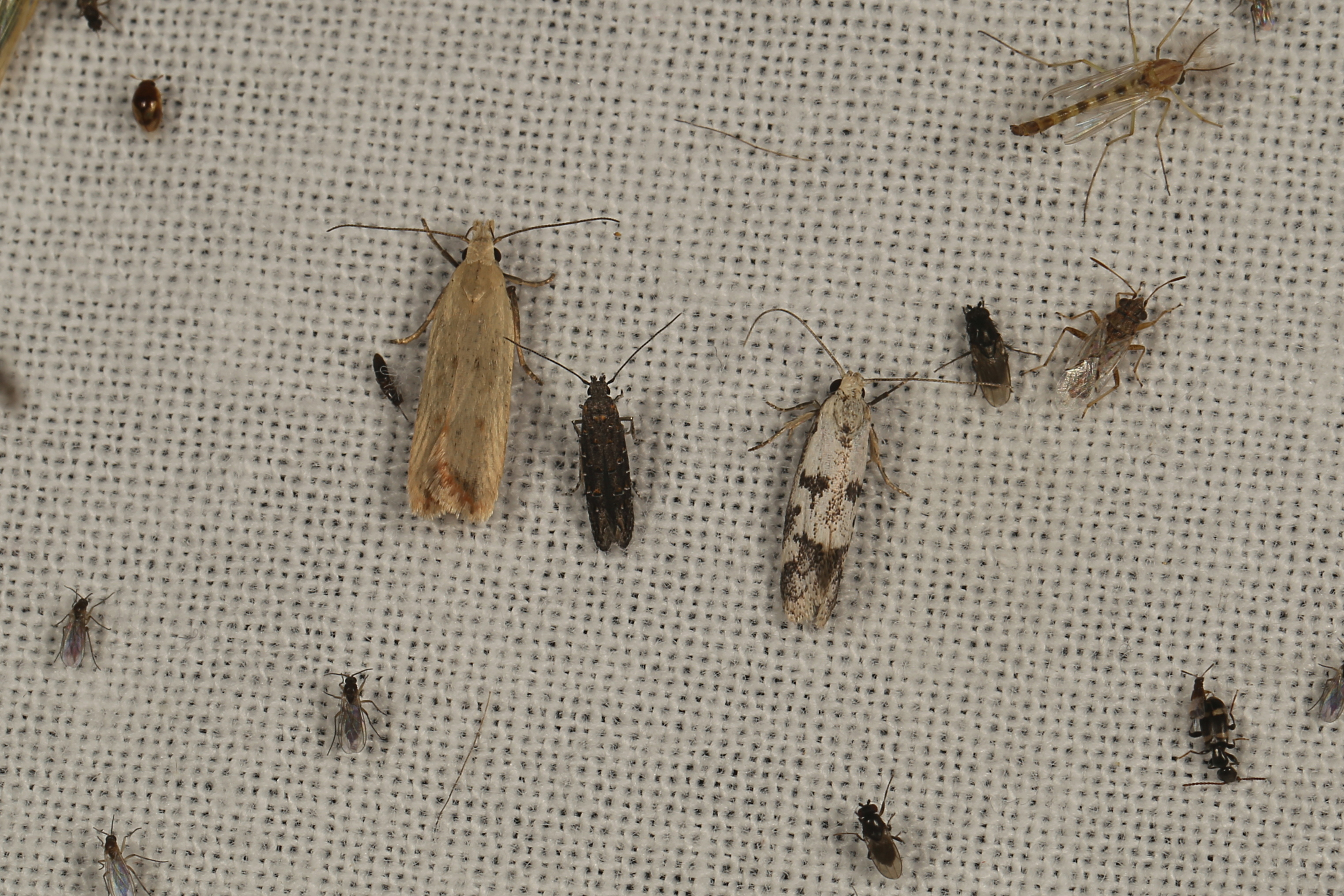

Scientific classification
- Domain: Eukaryota
- Kingdom: Animalia
- Phylum: Arthropoda
- Class: Insecta
- Order: Lepidoptera
- Family: Gelechiidae
- Genus: Dichomeris
- Species: D. cirrhostola

Binomial name
- Dichomeris cirrhostola Turner, 1919

= Dichomeris cirrhostola =

Species of moth

Dichomeris cirrhostola is a moth in the family Gelechiidae. It was described by Alfred Jefferis Turner in 1919. It is found in Australia, where it has been recorded from Queensland.

The wingspan is 14–17 mm (0.55–0.67 in). The forewings are whitish-ochreous with the costal edge fuscous at the base and with some ochreous-fuscous irroration before the lower part of the termen. The hindwings are ochreous-whitish.
