= Ardozyga frugalis =

Scientific classification
- Kingdom: Animalia
- Phylum: Arthropoda
- Clade: Pancrustacea
- Class: Insecta
- Order: Lepidoptera
- Family: Gelechiidae
- Genus: Ardozyga
- Species: A. frugalis

Binomial name
- Ardozyga frugalis (Meyrick, 1904)

Synonyms
- Protolechia frugalis Meyrick, 1904

Species of moth

Ardozyga frugalis is a species of moth in the family Gelechiidae. It was described by Edward Meyrick in 1904. It is found in Australia, where it has been recorded from New South Wales and Western Australia.

The wingspan is 9–11 mm (0.35–0.43 in). The forewings are fuscous, irrorated with dark fuscous, and finely sprinkled with whitish. The stigmata are very obscure, dark fuscous, with the plical obliquely beyond the first discal. The hindwings are grey or light grey.
