= Aristotelia clavata =

Scientific classification
- Kingdom: Animalia
- Phylum: Arthropoda
- Clade: Pancrustacea
- Class: Insecta
- Order: Lepidoptera
- Family: Gelechiidae
- Genus: Aristotelia
- Species: A. clavata

Binomial name
- Aristotelia clavata Meyrick, 1914

Species of moth

Aristotelia clavata is a moth of the family Gelechiidae. It was described by Edward Meyrick in 1914. It is found in Australia, where it has been recorded from Victoria.

The wingspan is about 11 mm. The forewings are light greyish ochreous, with some scattered fuscous and dark fuscous scales, more numerous along the costa and termen. There is a small blackish subbasal spot on the costa and the plical and first discal stigmata are confluent to form a transverse blackish spot. The second discal is represented by a small yellow-ochreous spot edged with blackish. The hindwings are grey.
