= Dichomeris plasticus =

Scientific classification
- Kingdom: Animalia
- Phylum: Arthropoda
- Class: Insecta
- Order: Lepidoptera
- Family: Gelechiidae
- Genus: Dichomeris
- Species: D. plasticus

Binomial name
- Dichomeris plasticus (Meyrick, 1904)

Synonyms
- Ypsolophus plasticus Meyrick, 1904; Telephila plasticus Meyrick, 1904

Species of moth

Dichomeris plasticus is a moth in the family Gelechiidae. It was described by Edward Meyrick in 1904. It is found in Australia, where it has been recorded from New South Wales.

The wingspan is 16–18 mm (0.63–0.71 in). The forewings are yellow ochreous, sprinkled with fuscous, with the plical and second discal stigmata small, obscure, dark fuscous. There is a small suffused dark fuscous spot before the tornus. The hindwings are grey, but darker posteriorly.
