= Hemiarcha macroplaca =

Scientific classification
- Domain: Eukaryota
- Kingdom: Animalia
- Phylum: Arthropoda
- Class: Insecta
- Order: Lepidoptera
- Family: Gelechiidae
- Genus: Hemiarcha
- Species: H. macroplaca

Binomial name
- Hemiarcha macroplaca (Lower, 1893)

Synonyms
- Gelechia macroplaca Lower, 1893

Species of moth

Hemiarcha macroplaca is a moth in the family Gelechiidae. It was described by Oswald Bertram Lower in 1893. It is found in Australia, where it has been recorded from Victoria.

The wingspan is about 14 mm. The forewings are dark-fawn colour with a black fascia, somewhat edged with white, from one-third of the costa, not reaching the inner margin, slightly dilated on the costa. There is a black spot at the base of the costa and a similar one beyond, both connected by a fine line along the costa. There is also a series of blackish dots along the apical-fourth of the costa, and continued along the costa around the hindmargin to the anal angle, the first three more conspicuous. A minute black dot is found on the inner margin at two-thirds, and a smaller one above, surmounted by a small white spot. The hindwings are dark grey.
