= Sphagiocrates chersochlora =

Scientific classification
- Domain: Eukaryota
- Kingdom: Animalia
- Phylum: Arthropoda
- Class: Insecta
- Order: Lepidoptera
- Family: Gelechiidae
- Genus: Sphagiocrates
- Species: S. chersochlora

Binomial name
- Sphagiocrates chersochlora (Meyrick, 1922)

Synonyms
- Phthorimaea chersochlora Meyrick, 1922

Species of moth

Sphagiocrates chersochlora is a moth of the family Gelechiidae. It was described by Edward Meyrick in 1922. It is found in Australia, where it has been recorded from Western Australia.

The wingspan is about 12 mm. The forewings are ochreous whitish, with some scattered fuscous and dark fuscous scales and with a broad costal streak of fuscous sprinkles from the base terminated by an oblique spot of dark fuscous sprinkles at one-fifth, beyond the apex of this a spot of dark fuscous sprinkles crossing the fold and similar small spots on the dorsum at the base and one-fifth. The plical and first discal stigmata are represented by cloudy spots of fuscous and dark fuscous sprinkles, the plical rather posterior, the second discal at four-fifths, distinct and dark fuscous. Between the discal stigmata are two short dashes of fuscous and dark fuscous sprinkles. The terminal area is suffusedly sprinkled with fuscous. The hindwings are whitish ochreous.
