= Streniastis thermaea =

Scientific classification
- Domain: Eukaryota
- Kingdom: Animalia
- Phylum: Arthropoda
- Class: Insecta
- Order: Lepidoptera
- Family: Gelechiidae
- Genus: Streniastis
- Species: S. thermaea

Binomial name
- Streniastis thermaea (Lower, 1897)

Synonyms
- Paltodora thermaea Lower, 1897

Species of moth

Streniastis thermaea is a moth in the family Gelechiidae. It was described by Oswald Bertram Lower in 1897. It is found in Australia, where it has been recorded from New South Wales and Tasmania.

The wingspan is about 20 mm. The forewings are orange yellow, deeper on the margins. There is a fine line of fuscous at the apex. The hindwings are black.
