= Pancoenia pygmaea =

Scientific classification
- Domain: Eukaryota
- Kingdom: Animalia
- Phylum: Arthropoda
- Class: Insecta
- Order: Lepidoptera
- Family: Gelechiidae
- Genus: Pancoenia
- Species: P. pygmaea

Binomial name
- Pancoenia pygmaea Turner, 1919

Species of moth

Pancoenia pygmaea is a moth in the family Gelechiidae. It was described by Alfred Jefferis Turner in 1919. It is found in Australia, where it has been recorded from Queensland.

The wingspan is 9–10 mm. The forewings are fuscous-whitish with dark-fuscous spots. The first discal is found at one-third, with the plical shortly before the first discal, the second discal at two-thirds. The hindwings are pale-grey.
