= Dichomeris lygropa =

Scientific classification
- Kingdom: Animalia
- Phylum: Arthropoda
- Clade: Pancrustacea
- Class: Insecta
- Order: Lepidoptera
- Family: Gelechiidae
- Genus: Dichomeris
- Species: D. lygropa

Binomial name
- Dichomeris lygropa (Lower, 1903)

Synonyms
- Ypsolophus lygropa Lower, 1903

Species of moth

Dichomeris lygropa is a moth in the family Gelechiidae. It was described by Oswald Bertram Lower in 1903. It is found in Australia, where it has been recorded from South Australia.

The wingspan is about 10 mm. The forewings are dull ochreous greenish with the costa more or less strigulated throughout with blackish. The markings are blackish with a dot in middle at one-fourth from the base, a second before the middle, the third beyond, the three forming a longitudinal series and more or less edged with a white dot and a fourth dot below and between the second and third, as well as an obscure row of dots along the termen and apical fourth of the costa. The hindwings are blackish.
