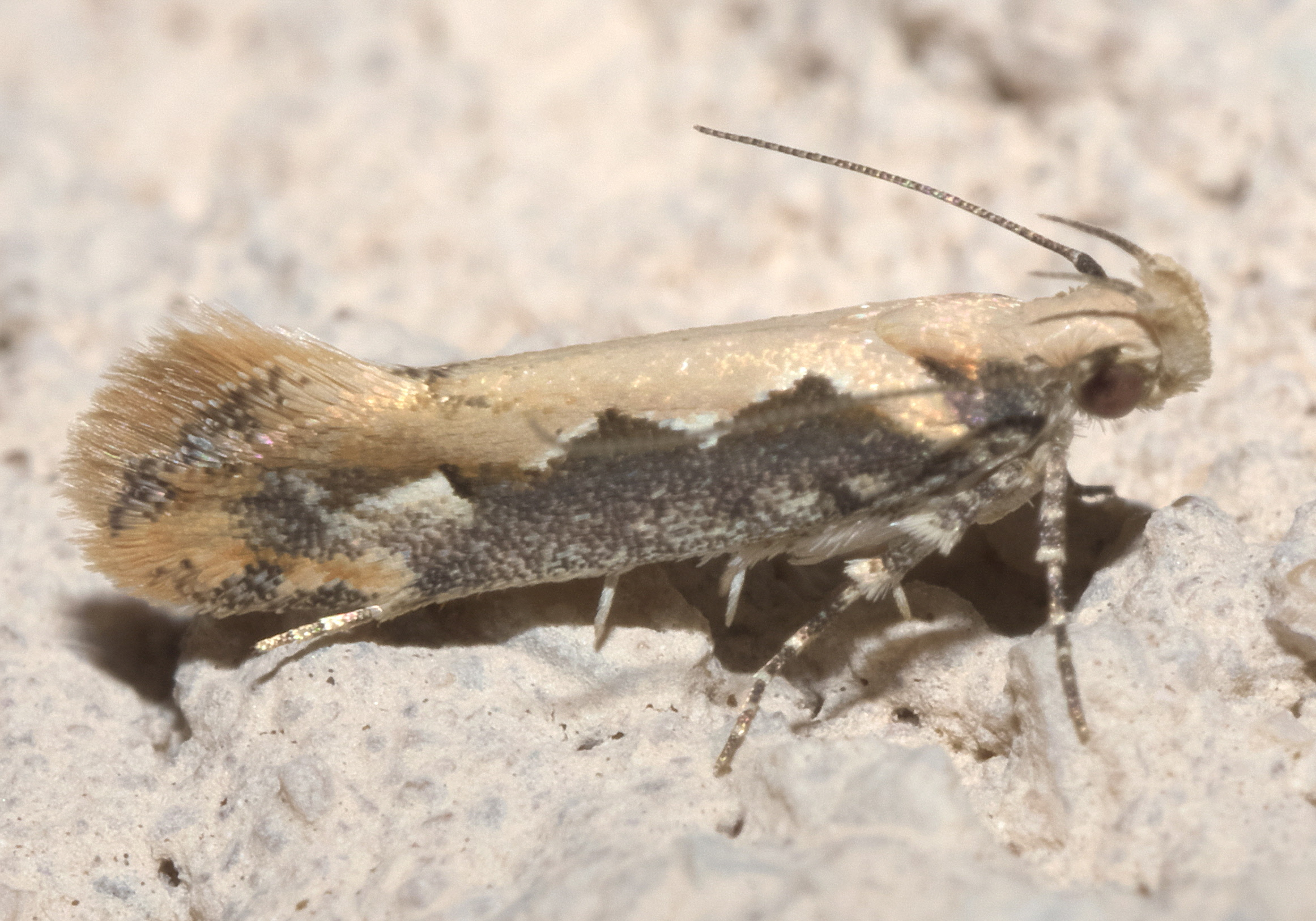
- Ornativalva erubescens

Scientific classification
- Kingdom: Animalia
- Phylum: Arthropoda
- Clade: Pancrustacea
- Class: Insecta
- Order: Lepidoptera
- Family: Gelechiidae
- Subfamily: Anomologinae; Meyrick, 1926

Synonyms
- Aristoteliinae Heslop, 1938; Metzneriini Piskunov, 1975

= Anomologinae =

Subfamily of moths

Anomologinae is a subfamily of moths in the family Gelechiidae.

== Taxonomy and systematics ==
- Tribe Anomologini
  - Anomologa Meyrick, 1926
  - Aristotelia Hübner, [1825]
  - Atremaea Staudinger, 1871
  - Bryotropha Heinemann, 1870
  - Catameces Turner, 1919
  - Caulastrocecis Chrétien, 1931
  - Deltophora Janse, 1950
  - Dirhinosia Rebel in Penther & Zederbauder, 1905
  - Dorycnopa Lower, 1901
  - Enchrysa Zeller, 1873
  - Gladiovalva Sattler, 1960
  - Iulota Meyrick, 1904
  - Ivanauskiella Ivinskis & Piskunov, 1980
  - Leptogeneia Meyrick, 1904
  - Megacraspedus Zeller, 1839
  - Naera Chambers, 1875
  - Nealyda Dietz, 1900
  - Numata Busck, 1906
  - Ornativalva Gozmány, 1955
  - Paranarsia Ragonot, 1895
  - Parapodia de Joannis, 1912
  - Proselotis Meyrick, 1914
  - Psamathocrita Meyrick, 1925
  - Ptycerata Ely, 1910
  - Pycnobathra Lower, 1901
  - Spiniductellus Bidzilya & Karsholt, 2008
  - Spiniphallellus Bidzilya & Karsholt, 2008
  - Stereomita Braun, 1922
  - Theisoa Chambers, 1874
  - Tosca Heinrich, 1920
  - Vadenia Caradja, 1933
- Tribe Isophrictini Povolný, 1979
  - Apodia Heinemann, 1870
  - Argolamprotes Benander, 1945
  - Daltopora Povolný, 1979
  - Eulamprotes Bradley, 1971
  - Isophrictis Meyrick, 1917
  - Metzneria Zeller, 1839
  - Monochroa Heinemann, 1870
  - Ptocheuusa Heinemann, 1870
  - Pyncostola Meyrick, 1917
- Unplaced to tribe
  - Clepsimorpha Janse, 1960
  - Euryctista Janse, 1963
  - Horridovalva Sattler, 1967
  - Huemeria Nel, Varenne & Bassi, 2022
  - Ischnocraspedus Janse, 1958
  - Merimnetria Walsingham, 1907
  - Phanerophalla Janse, 1960
  - Photodotis Meyrick, 1911
  - Pycnodytis Meyrick, 1918
  - Tenera Omelko in Omelko & Omelko, 1998
