= List of gelechiid genera: E =

The large moth family Gelechiidae contains the following genera:

- Elasiprora
- Emmetrophysis
- Empalactis
- Empedaula
- Empista
- Encentrotis
- Enchrysa
- Encolapta
- Encolpotis
- Ephelictis
- Ephysteris
- Epibrontis
- Epidola
- Epilechia
- Epimesophleps
- Epimimastis
- Epistomotis
- Erikssonella
- Eripnura
- Eristhenodes
- Erythriastis
- Ethirostoma
- Ethmiopsis
- Euchionodes
- Eucordylea
- Eudactylota
- Euhomalocera
- Eulamprotes
- Eunebristis
- Eunomarcha
- Euryctista
- Eurysacca
- Eustalodes
- Euzonomacha
- Exceptia
- Excommatica
- Exoteleia
