= List of gelechiid genera: N =

The large moth family Gelechiidae contains the following genera:

- Naera
- Narthecoceros
- Nealyda
- Neochronistis
- Neodactylota
- Neofaculta
- Neofriseria
- Neolechia
- Neopalpa
- Neopatetris
- Neoschema
- Neotelphusa
- Nesolechia
- Nevadopalpa
- Nothris
- Numata
- Nuntia
