= Eudactylota diadota =

Scientific classification
- Kingdom: Animalia
- Phylum: Arthropoda
- Clade: Pancrustacea
- Class: Insecta
- Order: Lepidoptera
- Family: Gelechiidae
- Genus: Eudactylota
- Species: E. diadota

Binomial name
- Eudactylota diadota Hodges, 1966

Species of moth

Eudactylota diadota is a moth of the family Gelechiidae. It is found in North America, where it has been recorded from Arizona.

The wingspan is 9.5–12 mm. Adults are similar to Eudactylota iobapta, but there are pink scales on the costal margin of the forewings from the fascia to the apex.
