= List of gelechiid genera: V =

The large moth family Gelechiidae contains the following genera:

- Vadenia
- Virgula
- Vladimirea
