= Eudactylota abstemia =

Scientific classification
- Kingdom: Animalia
- Phylum: Arthropoda
- Clade: Pancrustacea
- Class: Insecta
- Order: Lepidoptera
- Family: Gelechiidae
- Genus: Eudactylota
- Species: E. abstemia

Binomial name
- Eudactylota abstemia Hodges, 1966

Species of moth

Eudactylota abstemia is a moth of the family Gelechiidae. It is found in North America, where it has been recorded from Arizona.

The wingspan is 8–11 mm. Adults are similar to Eudactylota iobapta, but the forewings have more pinkish-white scales.
