= Chorivalva unisaccula =

Scientific classification
- Domain: Eukaryota
- Kingdom: Animalia
- Phylum: Arthropoda
- Class: Insecta
- Order: Lepidoptera
- Family: Gelechiidae
- Genus: Chorivalva
- Species: C. unisaccula

Binomial name
- Chorivalva unisaccula Omelko, 1988

Synonyms
- Neochronistis hodgesi Park, 1989

Species of moth

Chorivalva unisaccula is a moth of the family Gelechiidae. It is found in Korea and the Russian Far East.

The wingspan is 11-13.5 mm. Adults are similar to Chorivalva grandialata. The forewings are whitish brown, speckled with dark brown scales. The hindwings are grey.
