= Dorycnopa heliochares =

Scientific classification
- Domain: Eukaryota
- Kingdom: Animalia
- Phylum: Arthropoda
- Class: Insecta
- Order: Lepidoptera
- Family: Gelechiidae
- Genus: Dorycnopa
- Species: D. heliochares

Binomial name
- Dorycnopa heliochares (Lower, 1900)

Synonyms
- Gelechia heliochares Lower, 1900; Dorycnopa acroxantha Lower, 1901

Species of moth

Dorycnopa heliochares is a moth of the family Gelechiidae. It was described by Oswald Bertram Lower in 1900. It is found in Australia, where it has been recorded from South Australia.

The wingspan is about 14 mm. The forewings are reddish fuscous with a narrow oblique ochreous fascia, from one-fifth of the costa to one-fifth of the inner margin, not quite reaching the inner margin, the anterior edge well defined, the posterior edge suffused, followed by some ochreous scales in the disc, on which is placed a minute black dot. There is a narrow inwardly oblique ochreous fascia, from three-fourths of the costa to three-fourths of the inner margin, somewhat inflated on the middle, and there containing a minute black dot. A small ochreous spot is found on the costa before the apex. The hindwings are fuscous.
