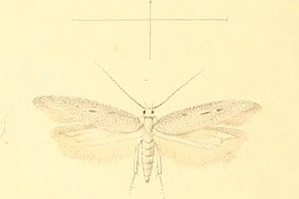

Scientific classification
- Kingdom: Animalia
- Phylum: Arthropoda
- Class: Insecta
- Order: Lepidoptera
- Family: Gelechiidae
- Genus: Caulastrocecis
- Species: C. gypsella

Binomial name
- Caulastrocecis gypsella (Constant, 1893)

Synonyms
- Doryphora gypsella Constant, 1893

= Caulastrocecis gypsella =

Species of moth

Caulastrocecis gypsella is a moth of the family Gelechiidae. It is found in France.

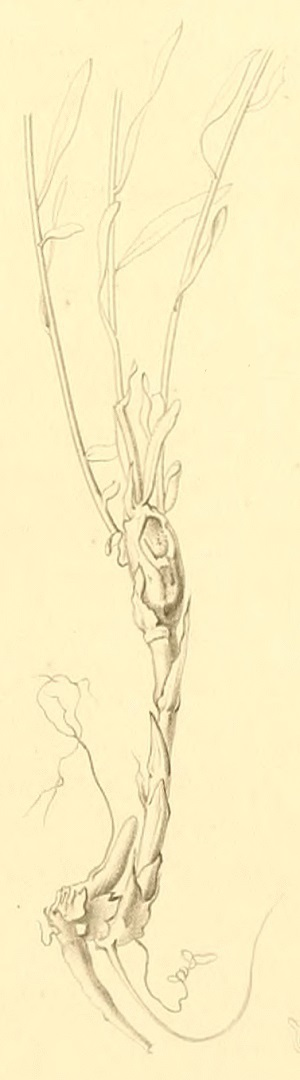
Damage

The wingspan is 16–20 mm.

The larvae feed on Aster acris.
