= Nealyda bicolor =

Scientific classification
- Kingdom: Animalia
- Phylum: Arthropoda
- Class: Insecta
- Order: Lepidoptera
- Family: Gelechiidae
- Genus: Nealyda
- Species: N. bicolor

Binomial name
- Nealyda bicolor (Walsingham, [1892])

Synonyms
- Didactylota bicolor Walsingham, [1892]

Species of moth

Nealyda bicolor is a moth of the family Gelechiidae. It was described by Thomas de Grey, 6th Baron Walsingham in 1892. It is found in the West Indies, where it has been recorded from St. Vincent.

The wingspan is about 7 mm. The forewings are rich fawn-brown to very near the middle, beyond fuscous speckled with pale cinereous. The margin of the two colours is straight and distinct across the wing, but with no dividing-line. The hindwings are pale greyish fuscous.
