= Neofaculta taigana =

Scientific classification
- Kingdom: Animalia
- Phylum: Arthropoda
- Class: Insecta
- Order: Lepidoptera
- Family: Gelechiidae
- Genus: Neofaculta
- Species: N. taigana

Binomial name
- Neofaculta taigana Ponomarenko, 1998

Species of moth

Neofaculta taigana is a moth in the family Gelechiidae. It was described by Ponomarenko in 1998. It is found in the Russian Far East and Hokkaido in Japan.

The wingspan is 21–22.5 mm.
