= Dirhinosia =

Scientific classification
- Domain: Eukaryota
- Kingdom: Animalia
- Phylum: Arthropoda
- Class: Insecta
- Order: Lepidoptera
- Family: Gelechiidae
- Subfamily: Anomologinae
- Genus: Dirhinosia; Rebel, 1905

Genus of moths

Dirhinosia is a genus of moths in the family Gelechiidae.

== Species ==
- Dirhinosia arnoldiella (Rebel, 1905)
- Dirhinosia cervinella (Eversmann, 1844)
- Dirhinosia nitidula (Stainton, 1867)
- Dirhinosia unifasciella (Rebel, 1929)
