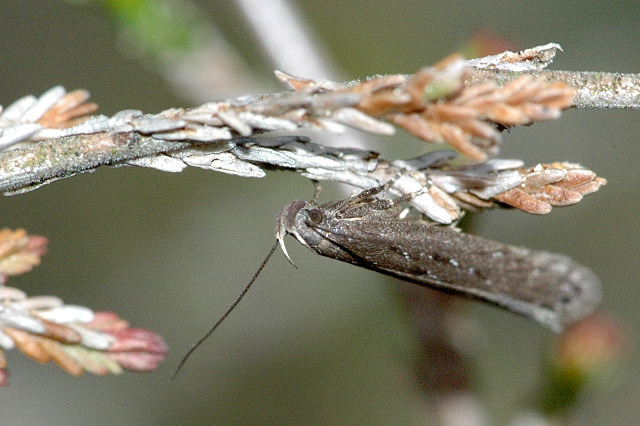

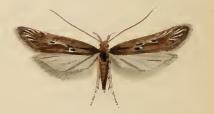

Scientific classification
- Domain: Eukaryota
- Kingdom: Animalia
- Phylum: Arthropoda
- Class: Insecta
- Order: Lepidoptera
- Family: Gelechiidae
- Genus: Neofaculta
- Species: N. ericetella

Binomial name
- Neofaculta ericetella (Geyer, 1832)

Synonyms
- Tinea ericetella Geyer, [1832]; Lita gallinella Treitschke, 1833; Anacampsis lanceolella Stephens, 1834; Acompsia fuscella Duponchel, 1844; Acompsia subatrella Duponchel, [1846]; Gelechia orcella Zerny, 1927; Gelechia atlanticella Amsel, 1938; Gelechia tenalella Amsel, 1938; Gelechia ericetella ab. amseli Dufrane, 1955; Gelechia pyrenemontana Dufrane, 1955; Gelechia simplicella Heinemann, 1870; Anacampsis quinquemaculella Bruand, 1859

= Neofaculta ericetella =

Species of moth

Neofaculta ericetella is a moth of the family Gelechiidae. It is found in Europe and Asia Minor.

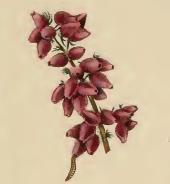
A sprig of Erica with a larva protruding from a flower

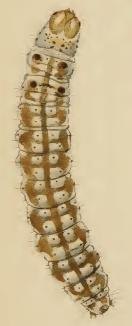
Larva

The wingspan is 13–18 mm. The terminal joint of palpi shorter than second. Forewings from pale fuscous- grey to dark fuscous, sometimes whitish-sprinkled; a blackish spot in disc at 1/4; stigmata blackish, often elongate, partly white margined, first discal beyond plical; distinct black terminal dots; a more or less marked dark tornal spot. Hindwings over 1, light grey. The larva is dull greenish; dorsal and subdorsal lines pale dull reddish; 3 and 4 with dark red subdorsal spots; head pale brown; 2 whitish-green, grey-speckled.

The moths are on wing from April to July depending on the location.

The larvae feed on Calluna vulgaris, Erica cinerea and Rhododendron species.
