= Exceptia neopetrella =

Scientific classification
- Domain: Eukaryota
- Kingdom: Animalia
- Phylum: Arthropoda
- Class: Insecta
- Order: Lepidoptera
- Family: Gelechiidae
- Genus: Exceptia
- Species: E. neopetrella

Binomial name
- Exceptia neopetrella (Keifer, 1936)

Synonyms
- Gnorimoschema neopetrella Keifer, 1936

Species of moth

Exceptia neopetrella is a moth in the family Gelechiidae. It was described by Keifer in 1936. It is found in North America, where it has been recorded from California.

The wingspan is 12–13 mm. The forewings are light ashen grey, the scales infused fuscous below the tip and again tipped white. There are scattered slightly ochreous scales, especially on the dorsum. An almost faint oblique dark shade is found from costal third, ending in the general dark central coloration. The plical stigma is blackish at about one-third and the first discal is the same, somewhat beyond the plical and halfway between it and the dorsum. The second discal is found at two-thirds in the center of the wing. The stigmata tend to be surrounded by white. The hindwings are fuscous.
