= Caulastrocecis furfurella =

Scientific classification
- Domain: Eukaryota
- Kingdom: Animalia
- Phylum: Arthropoda
- Class: Insecta
- Order: Lepidoptera
- Family: Gelechiidae
- Genus: Caulastrocecis
- Species: C. furfurella

Binomial name
- Caulastrocecis furfurella (Staudinger, 1871)

Synonyms
- Gelechia furfurella Staudinger, 1871; Metzneria cryptoxena Gozmány, 1952

Species of moth

Caulastrocecis furfurella is a moth of the family Gelechiidae. It is found in Austria, Italy, the Czech Republic, Slovakia, Romania, Ukraine, Russia and Kazakhstan.

The wingspan is 13–16 mm.
