= Eudactylota barberella =

Scientific classification
- Domain: Eukaryota
- Kingdom: Animalia
- Phylum: Arthropoda
- Class: Insecta
- Order: Lepidoptera
- Family: Gelechiidae
- Genus: Eudactylota
- Species: E. barberella

Binomial name
- Eudactylota barberella (Busck, 1903)

Synonyms
- Neodactylota barberella Busck, 1903; Euchionodes barberella

Species of moth

Eudactylota barberella is a moth of the family Gelechiidae. It is found in Mexico and the United States, where it has been recorded from Arizona, Colorado and New Mexico.

The wingspan is 11–14 mm.
