= Epimimastis escharitis =

Scientific classification
- Kingdom: Animalia
- Phylum: Arthropoda
- Class: Insecta
- Order: Lepidoptera
- Family: Gelechiidae
- Genus: Epimimastis
- Species: E. escharitis

Binomial name
- Epimimastis escharitis Meyrick, 1916

Species of moth

Epimimastis escharitis is a moth in the family Gelechiidae. It was described by Edward Meyrick in 1916. It is found in Sri Lanka.

The wingspan is about 19 mm. The forewings are rather dark brown with the costal edge suffused with fulvous ochreous on the median third and with two blackish dots transversely placed on the end of the cell. The hindwings are rather dark grey.
