= Clepsimorpha =

Scientific classification
- Domain: Eukaryota
- Kingdom: Animalia
- Phylum: Arthropoda
- Class: Insecta
- Order: Lepidoptera
- Family: Gelechiidae
- Subfamily: Anomologinae
- Genus: Clepsimorpha; Janse, 1960
- Species: C. inconspicua

Binomial name
- Clepsimorpha inconspicua Janse, 1960

Genus of moths

Clepsimorpha is a genus of moths in the family Gelechiidae. It contains only one species, Clepsimorpha inconspicua, which is found in South Africa.
