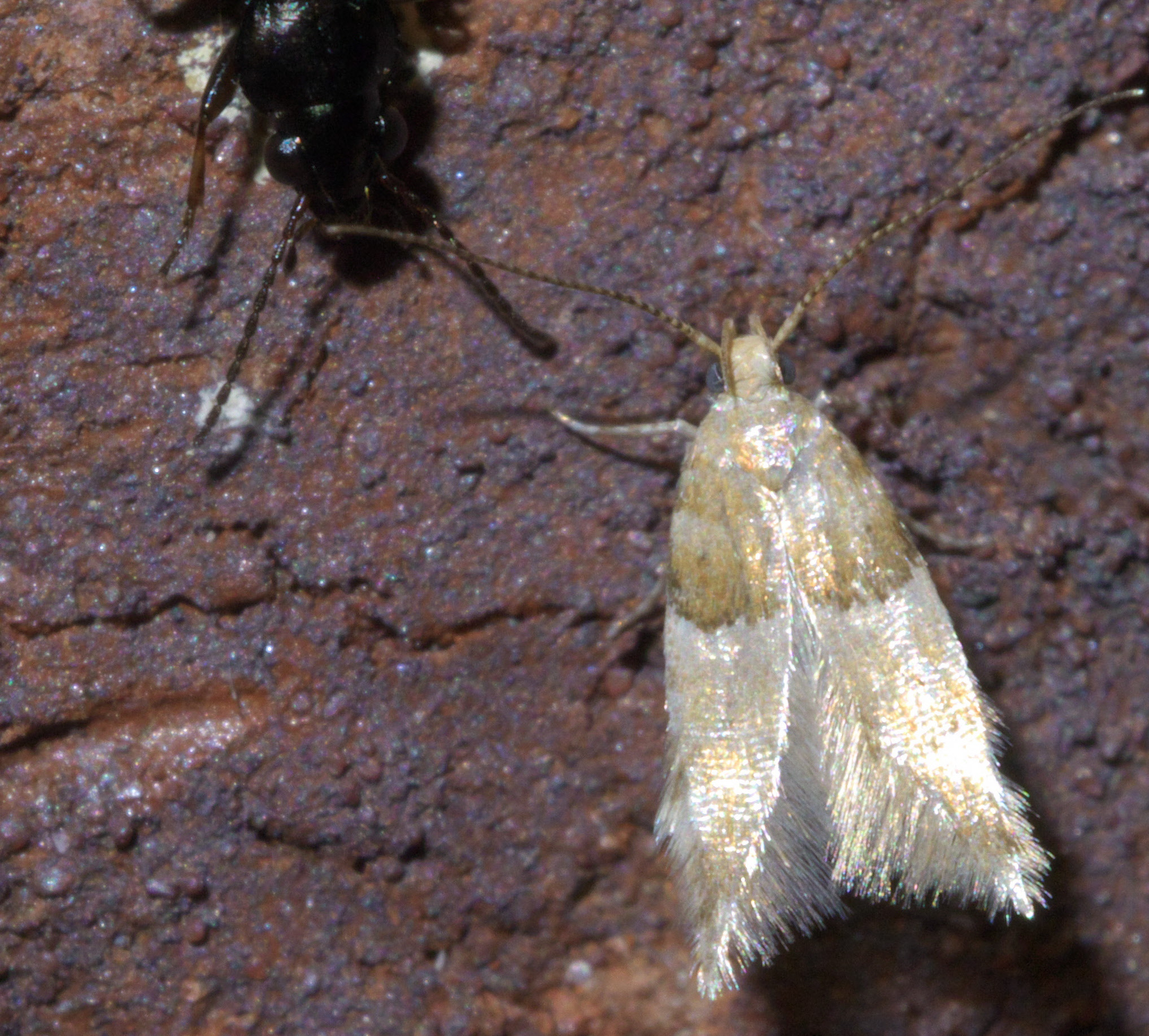

Scientific classification
- Kingdom: Animalia
- Phylum: Arthropoda
- Clade: Pancrustacea
- Class: Insecta
- Order: Lepidoptera
- Family: Gelechiidae
- Genus: Theisoa
- Species: T. constrictella

Binomial name
- Theisoa constrictella (Zeller, 1873)

Synonyms
- Oecophora constrictella Zeller, 1873; Theisoa bifasciella Chambers, 1874

= Theisoa constrictella =

Species of moth

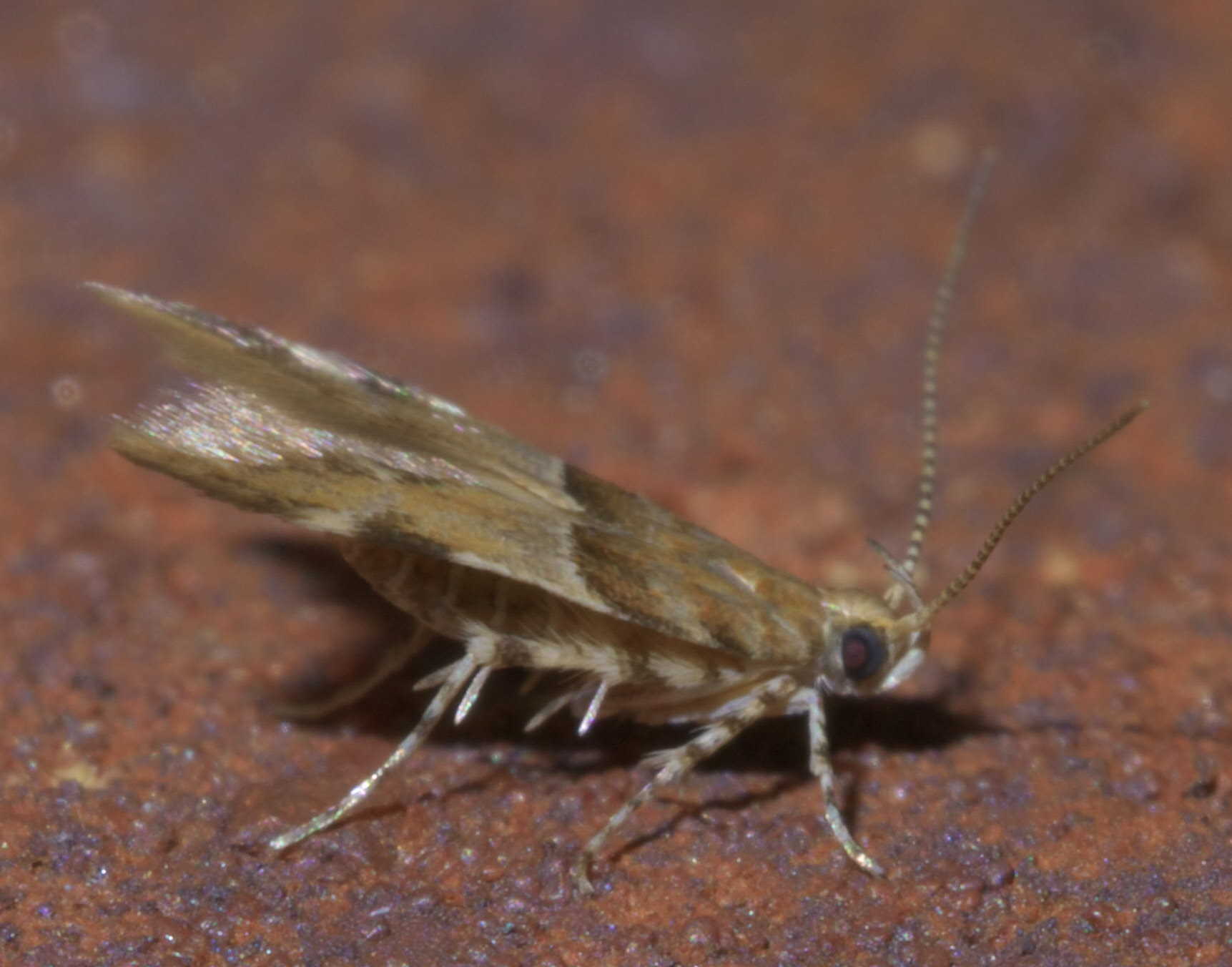
Theisoa constrictella, Hodges #1722, Size: 4.5 mm

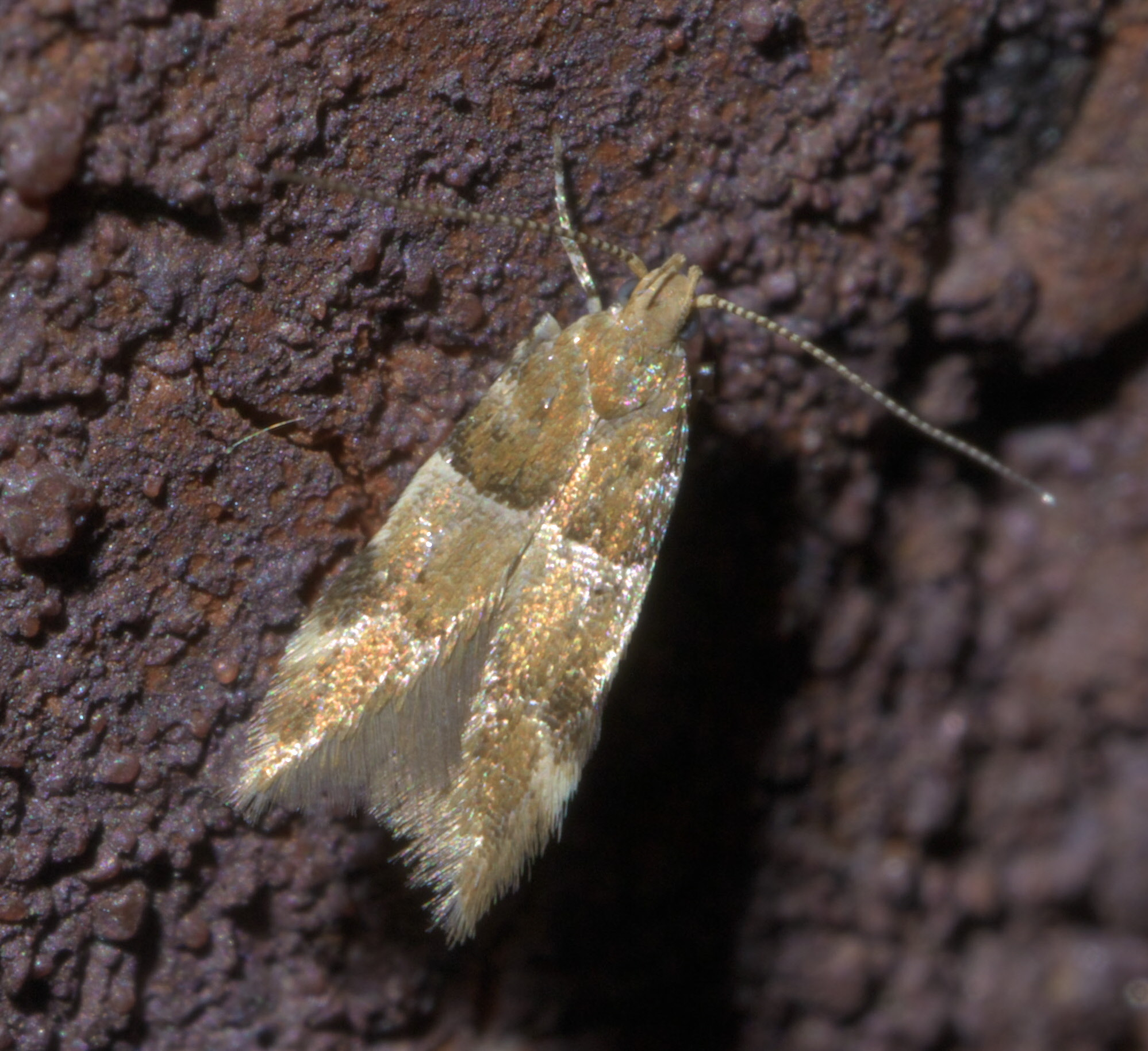
Theisoa constrictella, Hodges #1722, Size: 4.4 mm

Theisoa constrictella is a moth of the family Gelechiidae. It was described by Philipp Christoph Zeller in 1873. It is found in North America, where it has been recorded from Texas to Florida, north to Maryland and Kentucky.

The larvae feed on Ulmus species.
