= Neodactylota liguritrix =

Scientific classification
- Kingdom: Animalia
- Phylum: Arthropoda
- Clade: Pancrustacea
- Class: Insecta
- Order: Lepidoptera
- Family: Gelechiidae
- Genus: Neodactylota
- Species: N. liguritrix

Binomial name
- Neodactylota liguritrix Hodges, 1966

Species of moth

Neodactylota liguritrix is a moth of the family Gelechiidae. It was described by Ronald W. Hodges in 1966. It is found in North America, where it has been recorded from Louisiana, Mississippi and Texas.
