= Dorycnopa orthodesma =

Scientific classification
- Domain: Eukaryota
- Kingdom: Animalia
- Phylum: Arthropoda
- Class: Insecta
- Order: Lepidoptera
- Family: Gelechiidae
- Genus: Dorycnopa
- Species: D. orthodesma

Binomial name
- Dorycnopa orthodesma (Lower, 1901)

Synonyms
- Bactrolopha orthodesma Lower, 1901

Species of moth

Dorycnopa orthodesma is a moth of the family Gelechiidae. It was described by Oswald Bertram Lower in 1901. It is found in Australia, where it has been recorded from New South Wales.

The wingspan is 8–12 mm. The forewings are white with three moderately broad suffused pale ochreous equidistant fasciae, irregularly edged. The first from one-sixth of the costa to one-sixth of the inner margin, the second before the middle of the costa to before the middle of the inner margin, and the third from five-sixths of the costa to two-thirds of the inner margin. There is a suffused pale ochreous line along the termen. The hindwings are grey whitish in females and blackish in males.
