= Erythriastis rubentula =

Scientific classification
- Kingdom: Animalia
- Phylum: Arthropoda
- Class: Insecta
- Order: Lepidoptera
- Family: Gelechiidae
- Genus: Erythriastis
- Species: E. rubentula

Binomial name
- Erythriastis rubentula (Meyrick, 1914)

Synonyms
- Pachnistis rubentula Meyrick, 1914

Species of moth

Erythriastis rubentula is a moth in the family Gelechiidae. It was described by Edward Meyrick in 1914. It is found in Guyana.

The wingspan is 9–10 mm. The forewings are pale ochreous and the stigmata are dark fuscous, with the plical obliquely before the first discal. There are some small indistinct dark fuscous dots around the posterior part of the costa and termen, and a larger one at the tornus. The hindwings are light dull rosy.
