= Horridovalva tenuiella =

Scientific classification
- Kingdom: Animalia
- Phylum: Arthropoda
- Class: Insecta
- Order: Lepidoptera
- Family: Gelechiidae
- Genus: Horridovalva
- Species: H. tenuiella

Binomial name
- Horridovalva tenuiella Sattler, 1967

Species of moth

Horridovalva tenuiella is a moth of the family Gelechiidae. It was described by Sattler in 1967. It is found in Algeria.
