= Neofaculta confidella =

Scientific classification
- Domain: Eukaryota
- Kingdom: Animalia
- Phylum: Arthropoda
- Class: Insecta
- Order: Lepidoptera
- Family: Gelechiidae
- Genus: Neofaculta
- Species: N. confidella

Binomial name
- Neofaculta confidella (Rebel, 1936)

Synonyms
- Gelechia confidella Rebel, 1936

Species of moth

Neofaculta confidella is a moth in the family Gelechiidae. It was described by Rebel in 1936. It is found in south-eastern Turkey, Iraq and northern Syria.

The wingspan is about 18 mm (0.71 inches). The forewings are reddish-grey.
