= Epimimastis catopta =

Scientific classification
- Kingdom: Animalia
- Phylum: Arthropoda
- Class: Insecta
- Order: Lepidoptera
- Family: Gelechiidae
- Genus: Epimimastis
- Species: E. catopta

Binomial name
- Epimimastis catopta Turner, 1919

Species of moth

Epimimastis catopta is a moth in the family Gelechiidae. It was described by Alfred Jefferis Turner in 1919. It is found in Australia, where it has been recorded from Queensland.

The wingspan is 10–14 mm. The forewings are pale yellow with dark fuscous markings. There is a triangular spot on the costa from one-fourth to the middle, thickening towards the apex and a dot on the fold, another on the costa at two-thirds, an apical triangular spot traversed by a fine wavy oblique white line and a blackish terminal line around the apex. The hindwings are pale-grey.
