= Psamathocrita doloma =

Scientific classification
- Domain: Eukaryota
- Kingdom: Animalia
- Phylum: Arthropoda
- Class: Insecta
- Order: Lepidoptera
- Family: Gelechiidae
- Genus: Psamathocrita
- Species: P. doloma

Binomial name
- Psamathocrita doloma Bradley, 1965

Species of moth

Psamathocrita doloma is a moth of the family Gelechiidae. It was described by John David Bradley in 1965. It is found in Uganda.
