= Caulastrocecis tripunctella =

Scientific classification
- Kingdom: Animalia
- Phylum: Arthropoda
- Class: Insecta
- Order: Lepidoptera
- Family: Gelechiidae
- Genus: Caulastrocecis
- Species: C. tripunctella

Binomial name
- Caulastrocecis tripunctella (Snellen, 1884)

Synonyms
- Xystophora tripunctella Snellen, 1884

Species of moth

Caulastrocecis tripunctella is a moth of the family Gelechiidae. It is found in the Russian Far East (Amur region).
