= Gladiovalva badidorsella =

Scientific classification
- Domain: Eukaryota
- Kingdom: Animalia
- Phylum: Arthropoda
- Class: Insecta
- Order: Lepidoptera
- Family: Gelechiidae
- Genus: Gladiovalva
- Species: G. badidorsella

Binomial name
- Gladiovalva badidorsella (Rebel, 1935)

Synonyms
- Gelechia badidorsella Rebel, 1935

Species of moth

Gladiovalva badidorsella is a moth of the family Gelechiidae. It was described by Hans Rebel in 1935. It is found in Portugal, Spain and southern Russia.
