= Psamathocrita innotatella =

Scientific classification
- Kingdom: Animalia
- Phylum: Arthropoda
- Clade: Pancrustacea
- Class: Insecta
- Order: Lepidoptera
- Family: Gelechiidae
- Genus: Psamathocrita
- Species: P. innotatella

Binomial name
- Psamathocrita innotatella (Chrétien, 1915)

Synonyms
- Ptocheusa innotatella Chrétien, 1915

Species of moth

Psamathocrita innotatella is a moth of the family Gelechiidae. It was described by Pierre Chrétien in 1915. It is found in Tunisia.

The wingspan is about 11 mm. The forewings are white. The hindwings are greyish brown.
