= Ethirostoma semiacma =

Scientific classification
- Domain: Eukaryota
- Kingdom: Animalia
- Phylum: Arthropoda
- Class: Insecta
- Order: Lepidoptera
- Family: Gelechiidae
- Genus: Ethirostoma
- Species: E. semiacma

Binomial name
- Ethirostoma semiacma Meyrick, 1914

Species of moth

Ethirostoma semiacma is a moth in the family Gelechiidae. It was described by Edward Meyrick in 1914. It is found in Guyana.

The wingspan is 8–10 mm. The forewings are purplish fuscous, more or less suffusedly irrorated (sprinkled) with white and with a dark fuscous erect mark from the base of the dorsum and an irregular dark fuscous spot beneath the costa at one-fifth. There is a dark fuscous transverse streak from the dorsum at one-fourth, reaching halfway across the wing, posteriorly edged with white and there is a thick black streak along the costa from before the middle to near the apex, cut by two very oblique white strigulae from beyond the middle and at two-thirds. The stigmata are dark fuscous, the plical obliquely before the first discal, followed by a raised white spot, the first discal indistinct, the second enlarged into an irregular spot followed by a whitish tuft and there is an irregular elongate ochreous-white apical blotch, from the anterior extremity of which a faint dentate whitish line runs to the tornus. A leaden-grey spot adjoins an apical blotch beneath. The hindwings are grey in males and dark grey in females, thinly scaled towards the base.
