= Nealyda bougainvilleae =

Scientific classification
- Domain: Eukaryota
- Kingdom: Animalia
- Phylum: Arthropoda
- Class: Insecta
- Order: Lepidoptera
- Family: Gelechiidae
- Genus: Nealyda
- Species: N. bougainvilleae

Binomial name
- Nealyda bougainvilleae Hering, 1955

Species of moth

Nealyda bougainvilleae is a moth of the family Gelechiidae. It was described by Hering in 1955. It is found in Argentina.
