= Spiniductellus flavonigrum =

Scientific classification
- Kingdom: Animalia
- Phylum: Arthropoda
- Clade: Pancrustacea
- Class: Insecta
- Order: Lepidoptera
- Family: Gelechiidae
- Genus: Spiniductellus
- Species: S. flavonigrum

Binomial name
- Spiniductellus flavonigrum Bidzilya & Karsholt, 2008

Species of moth

Spiniductellus flavonigrum is a moth of the family Gelechiidae. It is found in south-eastern Kazakhstan and Kyrgyzstan.

The wingspan is 15–16 mm. The hindwings are grey. Adults are on wing from late July to August.

== Etymology ==
The species name refers to the colours of the wing pattern and is derived from Latin flavo (meaning yellow) and nigro (meaning black).
