= Dorycnopa triphera =

Scientific classification
- Domain: Eukaryota
- Kingdom: Animalia
- Phylum: Arthropoda
- Class: Insecta
- Order: Lepidoptera
- Family: Gelechiidae
- Genus: Dorycnopa
- Species: D. triphera

Binomial name
- Dorycnopa triphera Lower, 1920

Species of moth

Dorycnopa triphera is a moth of the family Gelechiidae. It was described by Oswald Bertram Lower in 1920. It is found in Australia, where it has been recorded from South Australia.

The wingspan is 14–16 mm. The forewings are dark fuscous, mixed with blackish and with dull ochreous markings. There is a moderately broad outwardly oblique fascia, anteriorly edged with fuscous, from just beneath the costa at one-fifth to the dorsum at about one-quarter continued along the dorsum to the middle. There are also three or four apical spots, sometimes confluent into two, as well as a small reddish-ochreous or ferruginous patch, beyond the posterior end of the cell, edged above and below with a small spot of ochreous white. A sharply defined black dot is found in the middle of the patch, sometimes edged with whitish. There is also a black, white-edged dot on the upper edge of the dorsal streak, at about one-quarter from the base of the wing. A similar dot is found in the middle of the wing, resting on the anterior edge of the ferruginous patch. The hindwings are greyish-white.
