= Psamathocrita dalmatinella =

Scientific classification
- Kingdom: Animalia
- Phylum: Arthropoda
- Clade: Pancrustacea
- Class: Insecta
- Order: Lepidoptera
- Family: Gelechiidae
- Genus: Psamathocrita
- Species: P. dalmatinella

Binomial name
- Psamathocrita dalmatinella Huemer & Tokár, 2000

Species of moth

Psamathocrita dalmatinella is a moth of the family Gelechiidae. It was described by Peter Huemer and Zdenko Tokár in 2000. It is found in Croatia.

The wingspan is 11-11.9 mm. Adults have been recorded on wing from May to June.

The larvae possibly feed on Achillea holosericea.
