= Neodactylota snellenella =

Scientific classification
- Domain: Eukaryota
- Kingdom: Animalia
- Phylum: Arthropoda
- Class: Insecta
- Order: Lepidoptera
- Family: Gelechiidae
- Genus: Neodactylota
- Species: N. snellenella

Binomial name
- Neodactylota snellenella (Walsingham, 1888)

Synonyms
- Dactylota snellenella Walsingham, 1888

Species of moth

Neodactylota snellenella is a moth of the family Gelechiidae. It was described by Walsingham in 1888. It is found in North America, where it has been recorded from Arizona and Texas.

The wingspan is 15.5–18 mm. The scales on the forewings are yellow, white, grey, buff, red brown and brown, often streaked with a light or dark hue. Most scales are tipped with brown. The hindwings are fuscous, with the margins of the scales darker than the remainder of the scale. The scales are shining orange at some angles of light incidence.
