= Psamathocrita argentella =

Scientific classification
- Domain: Eukaryota
- Kingdom: Animalia
- Phylum: Arthropoda
- Class: Insecta
- Order: Lepidoptera
- Family: Gelechiidae
- Genus: Psamathocrita
- Species: P. argentella

Binomial name
- Psamathocrita argentella Pierce & Metcalfe, 1942

Species of moth

Psamathocrita argentella is a moth of the family Gelechiidae. It was described by Frank Nelson Pierce and John William Metcalfe in 1942. It is found in Great Britain, where it has been recorded in salt marshes in Hampshire, Isle of Wight, Sussex, and Dorset.

The wingspan is 10–11 mm.

The larvae feed on the flowers and seeds of Agropyron pungens.
