= Tosca pollostella =

Scientific classification
- Domain: Eukaryota
- Kingdom: Animalia
- Phylum: Arthropoda
- Class: Insecta
- Order: Lepidoptera
- Family: Gelechiidae
- Genus: Tosca
- Species: T. pollostella

Binomial name
- Tosca pollostella (Busck, 1906)

Synonyms
- Evippe pollostella Busck, 1906

Species of moth

Tosca pollostella is a moth of the family Gelechiidae. It was described by August Busck in 1906. It is found in North America, where it has been recorded from Texas.

The wingspan is 5.5–6 mm. The forewings are ochreous white, heavily overlaid with dark fuscous scales, which in some places aggregate into blackish spots irregularly sprinkled over the wing. The hindwings are dark fuscous.
