= Dorycnopa marmorea =

Scientific classification
- Domain: Eukaryota
- Kingdom: Animalia
- Phylum: Arthropoda
- Class: Insecta
- Order: Lepidoptera
- Family: Gelechiidae
- Genus: Dorycnopa
- Species: D. marmorea

Binomial name
- Dorycnopa marmorea (Lower, 1899)

Synonyms
- Paltodora marmorea Lower, 1899

Species of moth

Dorycnopa marmorea is a moth of the family Gelechiidae. It was described by Oswald Bertram Lower in 1899. It is found in Australia, where it has been recorded from New South Wales.

The wingspan is 8–10 mm. The forewings are white with two irregular oblique pale fuscous parallel fasciae, the first from the costa near the base to one-fifth of the inner margin. The second just beyond. Both fasciae with a few blackish spots on the margins. There is also a fine elongate blackish mark in the middle of the disc and a second in a direct line beyond. There is a pale fuscous patch on the inner margin immediately below and the costa from the second fascia to about five-sixths is pale fuscous, while the apex is fuscous-tinged, more pronounced at the extreme apex. The hindwings are grey whitish.
