= Spiniphallellus fuscescens =

Scientific classification
- Kingdom: Animalia
- Phylum: Arthropoda
- Clade: Pancrustacea
- Class: Insecta
- Order: Lepidoptera
- Family: Gelechiidae
- Genus: Spiniphallellus
- Species: S. fuscescens

Binomial name
- Spiniphallellus fuscescens Bidzilya & Karsholt, 2008

Species of moth

Spiniphallellus fuscescens is a moth of the family Gelechiidae. It was described by Oleksiy V. Bidzilya and Ole Karsholt in 2008. It is found in north-eastern Turkey.

The wingspan is 14–15 mm.

== Etymology ==
The species name refers to the uniform dark brown forewing and is derived from Latin word fuscus (meaning dark).
