= Psamathocrita =

Scientific classification
- Domain: Eukaryota
- Kingdom: Animalia
- Phylum: Arthropoda
- Class: Insecta
- Order: Lepidoptera
- Family: Gelechiidae
- Subfamily: Anomologinae
- Genus: Psamathocrita; Meyrick, 1925

Genus of moths

Psamathocrita is a genus of moth in the family Gelechiidae.

== Species ==
- Psamathocrita albidella (Rebel, 1903)
- Psamathocrita argentella Pierce & Metcalfe, 1942
- Psamathocrita dalmatinella Huemer & Tokár, 2000
- Psamathocrita doloma Bradley, 1965
- Psamathocrita innotatella (Chrétien, 1915)
- Psamathocrita osseella (Stainton, 1861)
