= Nealyda leucozostra =

Scientific classification
- Kingdom: Animalia
- Phylum: Arthropoda
- Class: Insecta
- Order: Lepidoptera
- Family: Gelechiidae
- Genus: Nealyda
- Species: N. leucozostra

Binomial name
- Nealyda leucozostra Meyrick, 1923

Species of moth

Nealyda leucozostra is a moth of the family Gelechiidae. It was described by Edward Meyrick in 1923. It is found in Amazonas, Brazil.

The wingspan is about 7 mm. The forewings are dark grey, the posterior half irrorated (sprinkled) with black and with a slightly curved moderate white postmedian fascia, anteriorly black edged, the posterior edge suffused with grey. There is an irregular spot of whitish suffusion resting on the tornus, slenderly connected with the costa. The hindwings are dark grey.
