= Caulastrocecis interstratella =

Scientific classification
- Kingdom: Animalia
- Phylum: Arthropoda
- Clade: Pancrustacea
- Class: Insecta
- Order: Lepidoptera
- Family: Gelechiidae
- Genus: Caulastrocecis
- Species: C. interstratella

Binomial name
- Caulastrocecis interstratella (Christoph, 1873)

Synonyms
- Gelechia interstratella Christoph, 1873; Aristotelia interstratella; Aristotelia salinatrix Meyrick, 1926

Species of moth

Caulastrocecis interstratella is a moth of the family Gelechiidae. It is found in the southern part of European Russia (southern Ural, Lower Volga, Altai) and central Turkey.
