= Narthecoceros xylodes =

Scientific classification
- Kingdom: Animalia
- Phylum: Arthropoda
- Class: Insecta
- Order: Lepidoptera
- Family: Gelechiidae
- Genus: Narthecoceros
- Species: N. xylodes

Binomial name
- Narthecoceros xylodes Meyrick, 1906

Species of moth

Narthecoceros xylodes is a moth in the family Gelechiidae. It was described by Edward Meyrick in 1906. It is found in Sri Lanka.

The wingspan is 20–21 mm. The forewings are whitish ochreous, irrorated (sprinkled) with fuscous and with a moderate dark fuscous suffusion along the costa from before the middle to the apex, and the dorsal half posteriorly more or less suffused with dark fuscous irroration, the space between these sometimes forming an undefined pale streak. The stigmata are undefined and dark fuscous, with the plical very obliquely before the first discal. There are undefined cloudy dark fuscous dots along the posterior part of the costa and termen. The hindwings are rather dark fuscous.
