= Dirhinosia unifasciella =

Scientific classification
- Kingdom: Animalia
- Phylum: Arthropoda
- Class: Insecta
- Order: Lepidoptera
- Family: Gelechiidae
- Genus: Dirhinosia
- Species: D. unifasciella

Binomial name
- Dirhinosia unifasciella (Rebel, 1929)

Synonyms
- Rhinosia unifasciella Rebel, 1929

Species of moth

Dirhinosia unifasciella is a moth of the family Gelechiidae. It is found in central Turkey.

The wingspan is about 14 mm for males and 16 mm for females. Adults have been recorded on wing in late May.
