= Nealyda bifidella =

Scientific classification
- Kingdom: Animalia
- Phylum: Arthropoda
- Clade: Pancrustacea
- Class: Insecta
- Order: Lepidoptera
- Family: Gelechiidae
- Genus: Nealyda
- Species: N. bifidella

Binomial name
- Nealyda bifidella Dietz, 1900

Species of moth

Nealyda bifidella is a moth of the family Gelechiidae. It was described by Dietz in 1900. It is found in North America, where it has been recorded from Colorado, California, Arizona and North Carolina.

The wingspan is about 9.5 mm (0.37 in). The forewings are pale brown, tinged with golden and with a dark brown fascia at two-fifths, equidistant from the base at its costal and dorsal extremity, sharply defined externally and edged by a line of silvery white. Toward the base it passes gradually into the ground color of the wing. The extreme costa from the base to the fascia dark brown. There is a large costal patch of dark brown scales, beyond the middle. The hindwings are pale cinerous.
