= Empedaula rhodocosma =

Scientific classification
- Domain: Eukaryota
- Kingdom: Animalia
- Phylum: Arthropoda
- Class: Insecta
- Order: Lepidoptera
- Family: Gelechiidae
- Genus: Empedaula
- Species: E. rhodocosma

Binomial name
- Empedaula rhodocosma (Meyrick, 1914)

Synonyms
- Aristotelia rhodocosma Meyrick, 1914

Species of moth

Empedaula rhodocosma is a moth in the family Gelechiidae. It was described by Edward Meyrick in 1914. It is found in Guyana.

The wingspan is about 10 mm. The forewings are brown with a whitish patch sprinkled with dark grey occupying the basal third, the outer edge somewhat oblique, enclosing an irregular blackish blotch extending on the dorsum from the base to one-fourth and reaching more than halfway across the wing. There is an irregular somewhat oblique median fascia of dark grey and white irroration (sprinkles), its margins irregularly marked with crimson and the apical fourth of the wing irregularly spotted with crimson, surrounded with some dark grey and white irroration. The hindwings are dark grey.
