= Gladiovalva ignorella =

Scientific classification
- Domain: Eukaryota
- Kingdom: Animalia
- Phylum: Arthropoda
- Class: Insecta
- Order: Lepidoptera
- Family: Gelechiidae
- Genus: Gladiovalva
- Species: G. ignorella

Binomial name
- Gladiovalva ignorella Falkovitsh & Bidzilya, 2003

Species of moth

Gladiovalva ignorella is a moth of the family Gelechiidae. It was described by Mark I. Falkovitsh and Oleksiy V. Bidzilya in 2003. It is found in southern Kazakhstan and Uzbekistan.

The larvae feed on Atraphaxis spinosa.
