= Erythriastis rhodocrossa =

Scientific classification
- Kingdom: Animalia
- Phylum: Arthropoda
- Class: Insecta
- Order: Lepidoptera
- Family: Gelechiidae
- Genus: Erythriastis
- Species: E. rhodocrossa

Binomial name
- Erythriastis rhodocrossa (Meyrick, 1914)

Synonyms
- Pachnistis rhodocrossa Meyrick, 1914

Species of moth

Erythriastis rhodocrossa is a moth in the family Gelechiidae. It was described by Edward Meyrick in 1914. It is found in Guyana.

The wingspan is about 8 mm. The forewings are light greyish ochreous with the second discal stigma dark fuscous and with a series of small indistinct dark fuscous dots around the posterior part of the costa and termen, and a larger one at the tornus. The hindwings are rather dark grey.
