= Eurysacca melanocampta =

Scientific classification
- Kingdom: Animalia
- Phylum: Arthropoda
- Class: Insecta
- Order: Lepidoptera
- Family: Gelechiidae
- Genus: Eurysacca
- Species: E. melanocampta

Binomial name
- Eurysacca melanocampta (Meyrick, 1917)

Synonyms
- Phthorimaea melanocampta Meyrick, 1917; Phthorimaea melanocampta; Scrobipalpula melanocampta

Species of moth

Eurysacca melanocampta is a moth in the family Gelechiidae. It was described by Edward Meyrick in 1917. It is found in Peru.

== Description ==
The wingspan is about 16 mm. The forewings are light greyish ochreous, irregularly sprinkled with blackish grey, the costa is narrowly suffused with dark grey irroration (sprinkles) and with several cloudy black dots on the basal area. There is a thick black suffused streak from the costa at one-fourth, rather obliquely halfway across the wing, then abruptly bent and continued through the middle of the disc to the apex, attenuated posteriorly, nearly interrupted by small pale spots representing the discal stigmata, and irregularly interrupted near the apex. The hindwings are pale slaty grey.

== Distribution and habitat ==
This species is known to attack quinoa (Chenopodium quinoa). Females lay their eggs on the leaves of the quinoa plant, and they also feed on them. Females and males mate over the quinoa plants and develop their offspring.
