= Caulastrocecis =

Scientific classification
- Domain: Eukaryota
- Kingdom: Animalia
- Phylum: Arthropoda
- Class: Insecta
- Order: Lepidoptera
- Family: Gelechiidae
- Subfamily: Anomologinae
- Genus: Caulastrocecis; Chrétien, 1931

Genus of moths

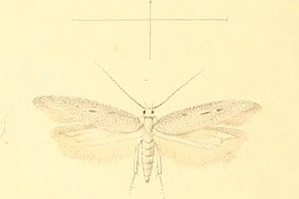
Caulastrocecis gypsella

Caulastrocecis is a genus of moth in the family Gelechiidae.

== Species ==
- Caulastrocecis furfurella (Staudinger, 1871)
- Caulastrocecis gypsella (Constant, 1893)
- Caulastrocecis interstratella (Christoph, 1873)
- Caulastrocecis perexigella Junnilainen, 2010
- Caulastrocecis pudicellus (Mann, 1861)
- Caulastrocecis tripunctella (Snellen, 1884)

== Former species ==
- Caulastrocecis salinatrix (Meyrick, 1926)
