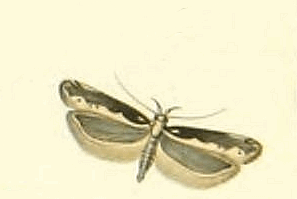

Scientific classification
- Domain: Eukaryota
- Kingdom: Animalia
- Phylum: Arthropoda
- Class: Insecta
- Order: Lepidoptera
- Family: Gelechiidae
- Genus: Gladiovalva
- Species: G. rumicivorella

Binomial name
- Gladiovalva rumicivorella (Millière, 1881)

Synonyms
- Gelechia rumicivorella Millière, 1881

= Gladiovalva rumicivorella =

Species of moth

Gladiovalva rumicivorella is a moth of the family Gelechiidae. It was described by Pierre Millière in 1881. It is found in Spain, France, Germany, Switzerland and Italy.
