= Epimesophleps symmocella =

Scientific classification
- Domain: Eukaryota
- Kingdom: Animalia
- Phylum: Arthropoda
- Class: Insecta
- Order: Lepidoptera
- Family: Gelechiidae
- Genus: Epimesophleps
- Species: E. symmocella

Binomial name
- Epimesophleps symmocella Rebel, 1907

Species of moth

Epimesophleps symmocella is a moth in the family Gelechiidae. It was described by Hans Rebel in 1907. It is found in Yemen, where it has been recorded from Socotra.
