= Atremaea lonchoptera =

Scientific classification
- Kingdom: Animalia
- Phylum: Arthropoda
- Class: Insecta
- Order: Lepidoptera
- Family: Gelechiidae
- Genus: Atremaea
- Species: A. lonchoptera

Binomial name
- Atremaea lonchoptera Staudinger, 1871

Synonyms
- Calamotypa exstans Meyrick, 1926

Species of moth

Atremaea lonchoptera is a moth of the family Gelechiidae. It is found in large part of Europe, except Ireland, Great Britain, the Iberian Peninsula, Switzerland, Belgium, Fennoscandia, the Baltic region and the western Balkan Peninsula. It is also found in Russia (southern Ural and western and southern Siberia).

The wingspan is 16–30 mm. Adults have been recorded on wing in July.

The larvae feed on Typha species.
