= Exceptia sisterina =

Scientific classification
- Kingdom: Animalia
- Phylum: Arthropoda
- Clade: Pancrustacea
- Class: Insecta
- Order: Lepidoptera
- Family: Gelechiidae
- Genus: Exceptia
- Species: E. sisterina

Binomial name
- Exceptia sisterina Powell & Povolný, 2001

Species of moth

Exceptia sisterina is a moth in the family Gelechiidae. It was described by Powell and Povolný in 2001. It is found in North America, specifically recorded in California.
