= Tosca (moth) =

Scientific classification
- Domain: Eukaryota
- Kingdom: Animalia
- Phylum: Arthropoda
- Class: Insecta
- Order: Lepidoptera
- Family: Gelechiidae
- Subfamily: Anomologinae
- Genus: Tosca; Heinrich, 1920

Genus of moths

Tosca is a genus of moth in the family Gelechiidae.

== Species ==
- Tosca elachistella (Busck, 1906)
- Tosca plutonella Heinrich, 1920
- Tosca pollostella (Busck, 1906)
