= Theisoa multifasciella =

Scientific classification
- Domain: Eukaryota
- Kingdom: Animalia
- Phylum: Arthropoda
- Class: Insecta
- Order: Lepidoptera
- Family: Gelechiidae
- Genus: Theisoa
- Species: T. multifasciella

Binomial name
- Theisoa multifasciella Chambers, 1875

Species of moth

Theisoa multifasciella is a moth of the family Gelechiidae. It was described by Vactor Tousey Chambers in 1875. It is found in North America, where it has been recorded from Texas.

The base of the forewings is brownish red. The forewings are banded with alternate wide fasciae of white and brownish red, the brownish-red fascia being margined rather narrowly behind with dark brown. Including the brownish red on the base of the wings, there are four fasciae of that hue and three white ones and the tip of the wing is also white. The hindwings are pale grayish fuscous.
