= Spiniphallellus stonisi =

Scientific classification
- Kingdom: Animalia
- Phylum: Arthropoda
- Clade: Pancrustacea
- Class: Insecta
- Order: Lepidoptera
- Family: Gelechiidae
- Genus: Spiniphallellus
- Species: S. stonisi

Binomial name
- Spiniphallellus stonisi Bidzilya & Karsholt, 2008

Species of moth

Spiniphallellus stonisi is a moth of the family Gelechiidae. It was described by Oleksiy V. Bidzilya and Ole Karsholt in 2008. It is found in south-eastern Kazakhstan.

The wingspan is about 17 mm. Adults are on wing in early August.

== Etymology ==
The species is named for Professor Jonas Rimantas Stonis.
