= Nealyda pisoniae =

Scientific classification
- Domain: Eukaryota
- Kingdom: Animalia
- Phylum: Arthropoda
- Class: Insecta
- Order: Lepidoptera
- Family: Gelechiidae
- Genus: Nealyda
- Species: N. pisoniae

Binomial name
- Nealyda pisoniae Busck, 1900

Species of moth

Nealyda pisoniae is a moth of the family Gelechiidae. It was described by August Busck in 1900. It is found in Cuba and the United States, where it has been recorded from Florida.

The wingspan is about 7 mm for males and 8.2 mm for females. The forewings are bright golden brown, with a dark, rich, velvety brown, broad fascia at one-third from the base, sharply defined on both sides, darkest, nearly black, and somewhat broader at the dorsal edge, where it terminates in slightly raised scales, projecting outside the edge of the wing in a dorsal tooth, and forming (at rest) a curious hump on the back. This fascia is still more thickly scaled than the rest of the wing. A little more than the apical third of wing is densely dusted with black scales, which condense into four, all black, velvety spots, one large costal spot, one-third from apex reaching down to the fold, one smaller apical, one moon shaped at the tornus, and a small round dot between the two latter. The last three are internally edged by light silvery scales forming an indistinct, thin, open V shape, with the point toward the apex. The hindwings are purplish gray with silvery reflections.

The larvae feed on Pisonia aculeata. They mine the leaves of their host plant. The mine has the form of a more or less irregular, large, trumpet-formed blotch on the upper surface with black frass scattered in the middle of the mine. Full-grown larvae reach a length of about 7 mm. They have a white body and a light-brown head.
