= Psamathocrita osseella =

Scientific classification
- Kingdom: Animalia
- Phylum: Arthropoda
- Clade: Pancrustacea
- Class: Insecta
- Order: Lepidoptera
- Family: Gelechiidae
- Genus: Psamathocrita
- Species: P. osseella

Binomial name
- Psamathocrita osseella (Stainton, 1861)

Synonyms
- Gelechia osseella Stainton, 1861

Species of moth

Psamathocrita osseella is a moth of the family Gelechiidae. It was described by Henry Tibbats Stainton in 1861. It is found in Sweden, Great Britain, France, Germany, Italy, Romania, Ukraine and Russia.

The wingspan is 11–12 mm. The forewings are bone-coloured, with a faint ochreous tinge, and indistinctly clouded with greyish along the costa and hind margin. The hindwings are grey.

The larvae feed on Origanum vulgare.
