= Huemeria =

Scientific classification
- Kingdom: Animalia
- Phylum: Arthropoda
- Class: Insecta
- Order: Lepidoptera
- Family: Gelechiidae
- Subfamily: Anomologinae
- Genus: Huemeria; Nel, Varenne & Bassi, 2022

Type species
- Gelechia campicolella Mann, 1857

Genus of moths

Huemeria is a genus of moths in the family Gelechiidae. It occurs in the Mediterranean region and in South Africa.

== Species ==
There are two recognized species:

- Huemeria campicolella (Mann, 1857)
- Huemeria heptacentra (Meyrick, 1911)

These species were previously included in Metzneria.
