= Narthecoceros logica =

Scientific classification
- Kingdom: Animalia
- Phylum: Arthropoda
- Class: Insecta
- Order: Lepidoptera
- Family: Gelechiidae
- Genus: Narthecoceros
- Species: N. logica

Binomial name
- Narthecoceros logica Meyrick, 1910

Species of moth

Narthecoceros logica is a moth in the family Gelechiidae. It was described by Edward Meyrick in 1910. It is found in Sri Lanka.

The wingspan is 13–14 mm. The forewings are fuscous whitish, sometimes partially and variably sprinkled with dark fuscous and with a suffused dark fuscous streak along the costa from about one-fourth to the apex. There are two small cloudy dark fuscous spots transversely placed at the end of the cell. The hindwings are grey.
