= Nealyda neopisoniae =

Scientific classification
- Kingdom: Animalia
- Phylum: Arthropoda
- Class: Insecta
- Order: Lepidoptera
- Family: Gelechiidae
- Genus: Nealyda
- Species: N. neopisoniae

Binomial name
- Nealyda neopisoniae Clarke, 1946

Species of moth

Nealyda neopisoniae is a moth of the family Gelechiidae. It was described by Clarke in 1946. It is found in Cuba.

The wingspan is 6–8 mm.

The larvae feed on Pisonia aculeata.
