= Dirhinosia arnoldiella =

Scientific classification
- Domain: Eukaryota
- Kingdom: Animalia
- Phylum: Arthropoda
- Class: Insecta
- Order: Lepidoptera
- Family: Gelechiidae
- Genus: Dirhinosia
- Species: D. arnoldiella

Binomial name
- Dirhinosia arnoldiella (Rebel, 1905)

Synonyms
- Rhinosia arnoldiella Rebel, 1905

Species of moth

Dirhinosia arnoldiella is a moth of the family Gelechiidae. It is found in Israel, Turkey and Greece.
