= Psamathocrita albidella =

Scientific classification
- Domain: Eukaryota
- Kingdom: Animalia
- Phylum: Arthropoda
- Class: Insecta
- Order: Lepidoptera
- Family: Gelechiidae
- Genus: Psamathocrita
- Species: P. albidella

Binomial name
- Psamathocrita albidella (Rebel, 1903)

Synonyms
- Ptocheusa albidella Rebel, 1903

Species of moth

Psamathocrita albidella is a moth of the family Gelechiidae. It was described by Hans Rebel in 1903. It is found in the Sahara.

The wingspan is about 12 mm. The forewings are white with some black scales, forming a small marking at three-fourths. The hindwings are greyish-white.
