= Gladiovalva aizpuruai =

Scientific classification
- Domain: Eukaryota
- Kingdom: Animalia
- Phylum: Arthropoda
- Class: Insecta
- Order: Lepidoptera
- Family: Gelechiidae
- Genus: Gladiovalva
- Species: G. aizpuruai

Binomial name
- Gladiovalva aizpuruai Vives, 1990

Species of moth

Gladiovalva aizpuruai is a moth of the family Gelechiidae. It was described by Vives in 1990. It is found in the Czech Republic, Slovakia, Hungary and Spain.

The larvae feed on Rumex acetosa.
