= Tosca elachistella =

Scientific classification
- Domain: Eukaryota
- Kingdom: Animalia
- Phylum: Arthropoda
- Class: Insecta
- Order: Lepidoptera
- Family: Gelechiidae
- Genus: Tosca
- Species: T. elachistella

Binomial name
- Tosca elachistella (Busck, 1906)

Synonyms
- Recurvaria elachistella Busck, 1906

Species of moth

Tosca elachistella is a moth of the family Gelechiidae. It was described by August Busck in 1906. It is found in North America, where it has been recorded from Texas.

The wingspan is 7–8 mm. The forewings are light silvery ochreous, somewhat darker along the costal edge and toward the apex. There are six small dots of blackish raised scales in two longitudinal rows, the upper through the middle of the wing, the lower on the fold. The hindwings are light fuscous.
