= Tenera =

Scientific classification
- Kingdom: Animalia
- Phylum: Arthropoda
- Clade: Pancrustacea
- Class: Insecta
- Order: Lepidoptera
- Family: Gelechiidae
- Subfamily: Anomologinae
- Genus: Tenera; Omelko in Omelko & Omelko, 1998
- Species: T. vittata

Binomial name
- Tenera vittata Omelko, 1998

Genus of moths

Tenera is a genus of moth in the family Gelechiidae. It contains the species Tenera vittata, which is found in the Russian Far East.
