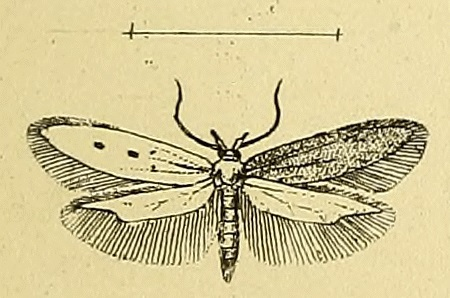

Scientific classification
- Domain: Eukaryota
- Kingdom: Animalia
- Phylum: Arthropoda
- Class: Insecta
- Order: Lepidoptera
- Family: Gelechiidae
- Genus: Caulastrocecis
- Species: C. pudicellus

Binomial name
- Caulastrocecis pudicellus (Mann, 1861)

Synonyms
- Hypsolophus pudicellus Mann, 1861; Dichomeris pudicellus

= Caulastrocecis pudicellus =

Species of moth

Caulastrocecis pudicellus is a moth of the family Gelechiidae. It is found in Spain, Slovenia, Croatia, Romania, as well as on the Greek islands and Crete.
