= Eurysacca chili =

Scientific classification
- Kingdom: Animalia
- Phylum: Arthropoda
- Clade: Pancrustacea
- Class: Insecta
- Order: Lepidoptera
- Family: Gelechiidae
- Genus: Eurysacca
- Species: E. chili

Binomial name
- Eurysacca chili (Povolný, 1967)

Synonyms
- Scrobipalopsis chili Povolný, 1967; Tecia chili; Ptycerata chili

Species of moth

Eurysacca chili is a moth in the family Gelechiidae. It was described by Povolný in 1967. It is found in Chile.
