= Ivanauskiella psamathias =

Scientific classification
- Kingdom: Animalia
- Phylum: Arthropoda
- Class: Insecta
- Order: Lepidoptera
- Family: Gelechiidae
- Genus: Ivanauskiella
- Species: I. psamathias

Binomial name
- Ivanauskiella psamathias (Meyrick, 1895)

Synonyms
- Apodia psamathias Meyrick, 1895; Ivanauskiella turkmenica Ivinskis & Piskunov, 1980

Species of moth

Ivanauskiella psamathias is a moth of the family Gelechiidae. It is found in Bulgaria, Russia (southern Ural, Volga-Don region, southern Siberia), Ukraine, Mongolia, Turkmenistan and North Africa.
