= Empedaula phanerozona =

Scientific classification
- Domain: Eukaryota
- Kingdom: Animalia
- Phylum: Arthropoda
- Class: Insecta
- Order: Lepidoptera
- Family: Gelechiidae
- Genus: Empedaula
- Species: E. phanerozona

Binomial name
- Empedaula phanerozona Meyrick, 1922

Species of moth

Empedaula phanerozona is a moth in the family Gelechiidae. It was described by Edward Meyrick in 1922. It is found in Brazil.

The wingspan is 11–12 mm. The forewings are ochreous whitish, somewhat sprinkled irregularly with light grey and there are small dots of blackish irroration (sprinkles) at the base of the costa and dorsum. There is also a transverse brownish stria irrorated with blackish at one-fifth more or less expressed, as well as a moderate slightly oblique brown fascia before the middle, darker posteriorly. Minute black dots are found in the disc at the middle and three-fourths. The costa is broadly suffused with fuscous on the posterior half, some rosy-whitish irroration crossing the wing near the apex. The hindwings are rather dark grey.
