= Epimimastis glaucodes =

Scientific classification
- Kingdom: Animalia
- Phylum: Arthropoda
- Class: Insecta
- Order: Lepidoptera
- Family: Gelechiidae
- Genus: Epimimastis
- Species: E. glaucodes

Binomial name
- Epimimastis glaucodes Meyrick, 1910

Species of moth

Epimimastis glaucodes is a moth in the family Gelechiidae. It was described by Edward Meyrick in 1910. It is found in Sri Lanka.

The wingspan is 16–17 mm. The forewings are grey with a black dot near the base above the middle and an oval blackish blotch in the disc before the middle, edged with white. The second discal stigma is black edged with white and the apex and termen are somewhat suffused with darker, with a blackish marginal line. The hindwings are light grey.
