= Theisoa pallidochrella =

Scientific classification
- Kingdom: Animalia
- Phylum: Arthropoda
- Clade: Pancrustacea
- Class: Insecta
- Order: Lepidoptera
- Family: Gelechiidae
- Genus: Theisoa
- Species: T. pallidochrella

Binomial name
- Theisoa pallidochrella (Chambers, 1873)

Synonyms
- Helice pallidochrella Chambers, 1873; Gelechia gleditschiaeella Chambers, 1878; Cacelice permolestella Busck, 1902

Species of moth

Theisoa pallidochrella is a species of moth in the family Gelechiidae. It was first described by Vactor Tousey Chambers in 1873. It is found in North America, where it has been recorded from Kentucky and Illinois.

== Description ==
The wingspan is about 10 mm (0.39 in). The forewings are light reddish gray, minutely dusted with dark purplish-fuscous scales. Near the base is an inconspicuous, small, dark, bronzy-brown, costal dot. At the basal third is a large transverse dark bronzy-brown costal spot, reaching down across the fold. At about the apical third is a smaller concolorous costal spot and the tip of the wing has the dark scales collected into ill-defined transverse spots or streaks. The hindwings are shining, dark fuscous.
