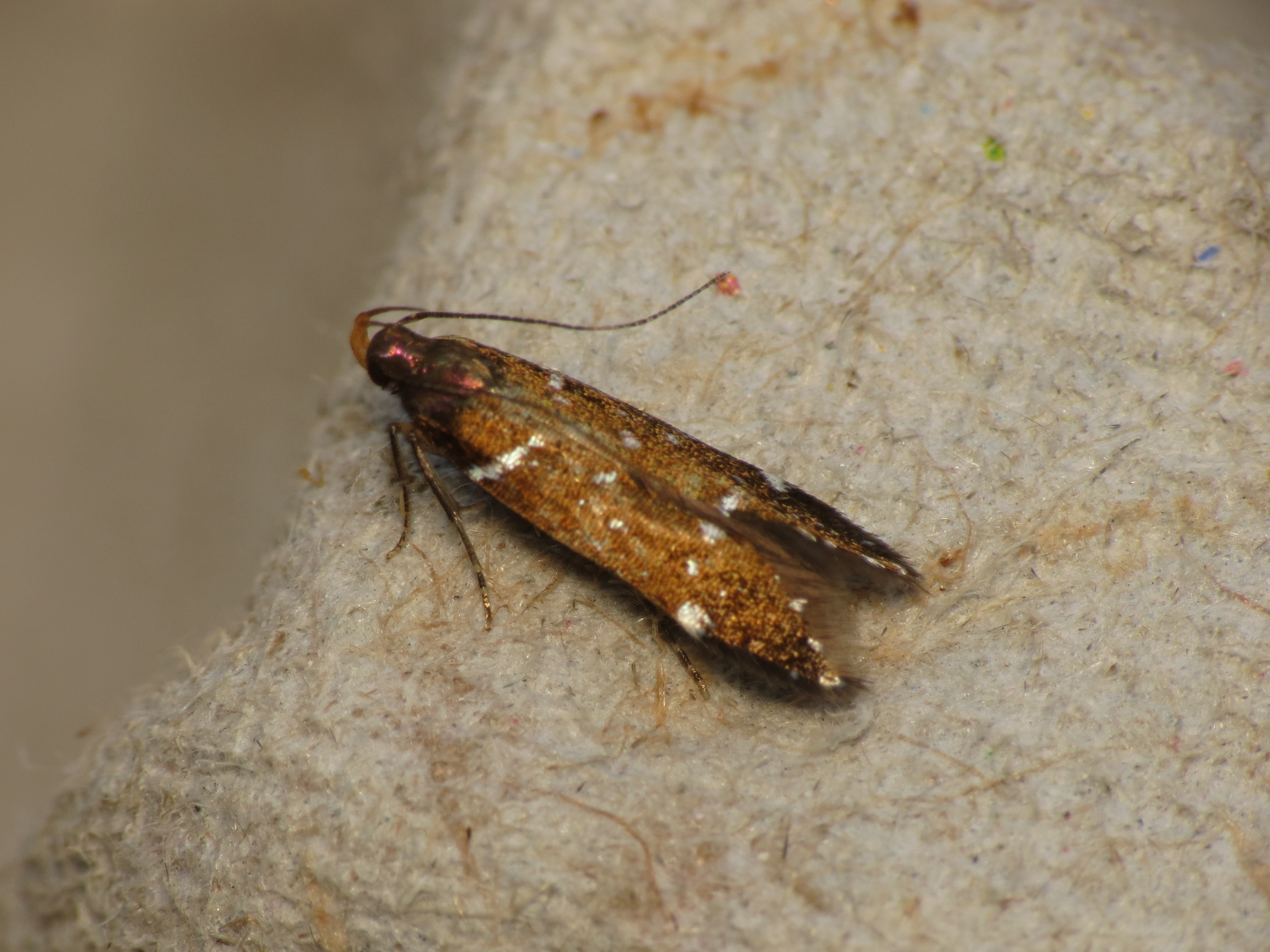

Scientific classification
- Domain: Eukaryota
- Kingdom: Animalia
- Phylum: Arthropoda
- Class: Insecta
- Order: Lepidoptera
- Family: Gelechiidae
- Genus: Argolamprotes
- Species: A. micella

Binomial name
- Argolamprotes micella (Denis & Schiffermüller, 1775)

Synonyms
- Tinea micella Denis & Schiffermüller, 1775; Argolamprotes astrella Treitschke, 1833

= Argolamprotes micella =

Bright neb

Species of moth

Argolamprotes micella, the bright neb, is a moth of the family Gelechiidae. It is found in most of Europe, except Ireland, the Iberian Peninsula and most of the Balkan Peninsula. Outside of Europe, it is known from Siberia, the Russian Far East, the southern Kuril Islands and Japan. The habitat consists of hedgerows, open woodland and gardens.

The wingspan is 10–14 mm. Adults are on wing in June and July.

The larvae feed on Rubus idaeus and Rubus fruticosus. They feed from within the flowering shoots and buds.
