= Dirhinosia nitidula =

Scientific classification
- Kingdom: Animalia
- Phylum: Arthropoda
- Clade: Pancrustacea
- Class: Insecta
- Order: Lepidoptera
- Family: Gelechiidae
- Genus: Dirhinosia
- Species: D. nitidula

Binomial name
- Dirhinosia nitidula (Stainton, 1867)

Synonyms
- Gelechia nitidula Stainton, 1867

Species of moth

Dirhinosia nitidula is a moth of the family Gelechiidae. It is found in Israel, Syria, Lebanon and Turkey.

The wingspan is 11–13 mm. Adults have been recorded on wing from May to June.
