= Exceptia hospita =

Scientific classification
- Kingdom: Animalia
- Phylum: Arthropoda
- Clade: Pancrustacea
- Class: Insecta
- Order: Lepidoptera
- Family: Gelechiidae
- Genus: Exceptia
- Species: E. hospita

Binomial name
- Exceptia hospita Povolný, 1989

Species of moth

Exceptia hospita is a moth in the family Gelechiidae. It was described by Povolný in 1989. It is found in Argentina.
