= Catameces =

Scientific classification
- Domain: Eukaryota
- Kingdom: Animalia
- Phylum: Arthropoda
- Class: Insecta
- Order: Lepidoptera
- Family: Gelechiidae
- Subfamily: Anomologinae
- Genus: Catameces; Turner, 1919
- Species: C. peribapta

Binomial name
- Catameces peribapta (Lower, 1918)

Synonyms
- Aristotelia peribapta Lower, 1918; Catameces thiophara Turner, 1919

Genus of moths

Catameces is a genus of moth in the family Gelechiidae. It contains the species Catameces peribapta, which is found in Australia, where it has been recorded from Queensland and South Australia.

The wingspan is 18–20 mm. The forewings are pale ochreous-yellow, the margins minutely irrorated with darker ochreous. The hindwings are pale fuscous.
