= Neodactylota egena =

Scientific classification
- Kingdom: Animalia
- Phylum: Arthropoda
- Clade: Pancrustacea
- Class: Insecta
- Order: Lepidoptera
- Family: Gelechiidae
- Genus: Neodactylota
- Species: N. egena

Binomial name
- Neodactylota egena Hodges, 1966

Species of moth

Neodactylota egena is a moth of the family Gelechiidae. It was described by Ronald W. Hodges in 1966. It is found in North America, where it has been recorded from California and Arizona.

The wingspan is about 10.5 mm. The forewings are nearly uniform gray brown, with the scale bases pale and the marks on the disc brown, not strongly contrasting with the gray-brown background. The hindwings are fuscous.
