= Horridovalva renatella =

Scientific classification
- Domain: Eukaryota
- Kingdom: Animalia
- Phylum: Arthropoda
- Class: Insecta
- Order: Lepidoptera
- Family: Gelechiidae
- Genus: Horridovalva
- Species: H. renatella

Binomial name
- Horridovalva renatella (Amsel, 1978)

Synonyms
- Struempella renatella Amsel, 1978

Species of moth

Horridovalva renatella is a moth of the family Gelechiidae. It was described by Hans Georg Amsel in 1978. It is found in Iran.
