= Eurysacca danorum =

Scientific classification
- Kingdom: Animalia
- Phylum: Arthropoda
- Clade: Pancrustacea
- Class: Insecta
- Order: Lepidoptera
- Family: Gelechiidae
- Genus: Eurysacca
- Species: E. danorum

Binomial name
- Eurysacca danorum Povolný, 1986

Species of moth

Eurysacca danorum is a moth in the family Gelechiidae. It was described by Povolný in 1986. It is found in Argentina.
