= Neodactylota basilica =

Scientific classification
- Kingdom: Animalia
- Phylum: Arthropoda
- Clade: Pancrustacea
- Class: Insecta
- Order: Lepidoptera
- Family: Gelechiidae
- Genus: Neodactylota
- Species: N. basilica

Binomial name
- Neodactylota basilica Hodges, 1966

Species of moth

Neodactylota basilica is a moth of the family Gelechiidae. It was described by Ronald W. Hodges in 1966. It is found in North America, where it has been recorded from Arizona.

The wingspan is 10.5–12 mm. The scales on the forewings are buff white with gray-brown apices and dark brown spots. The costal margin, especially basally, is gray brown. The hindwings are fuscous.
