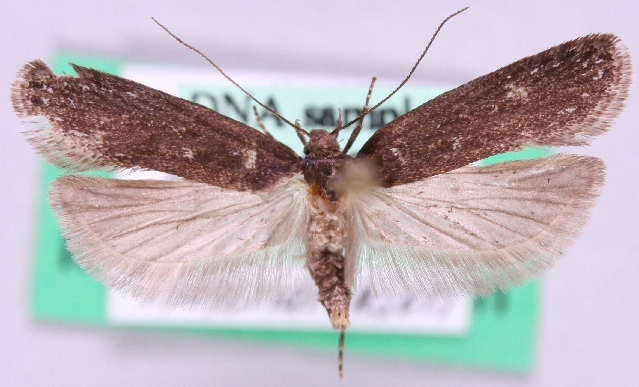

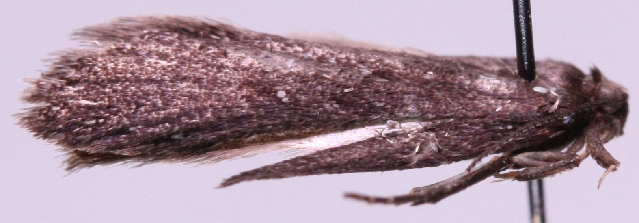

Scientific classification
- Domain: Eukaryota
- Kingdom: Animalia
- Phylum: Arthropoda
- Class: Insecta
- Order: Lepidoptera
- Family: Gelechiidae
- Genus: Neofaculta
- Species: N. infernella

Binomial name
- Neofaculta infernella (Herrich-Schäffer, [1854])

Synonyms
- Gelechia infernella Herrich-Schäffer, [1854]; Neofaculta infernalis

= Neofaculta infernella =

Species of moth

Neofaculta infernella is a moth of the family Gelechiidae. It was described by Gottlieb August Wilhelm Herrich-Schäffer in 1854. It is found in most of Europe and has also been recorded from North America.

The wingspan is 16–20 mm. In western Europe, adults are on wing from August to May.

The larvae feed on Betula species, Vaccinium myrtillus, Inula helenium, Rhododendron species and Ledum groenlandicum. The species overwinters in the larval stage.
