= Ephelictis neochalca =

Scientific classification
- Kingdom: Animalia
- Phylum: Arthropoda
- Class: Insecta
- Order: Lepidoptera
- Family: Gelechiidae
- Genus: Ephelictis
- Species: E. neochalca

Binomial name
- Ephelictis neochalca Meyrick, 1904

Species of moth

Ephelictis neochalca is a moth in the family Gelechiidae. It was described by Edward Meyrick in 1904. It is found in Australia, where it has been recorded from Western Australia.

The wingspan is 17–19 mm (0.67–0.75 in). The forewings are shining brassy bronze with a rather narrow suffused white costal streak from near the base to three-fourths, extremities attenuated. The stigmata are small and black, with the plical obliquely beyond the first discal. The hindwings are grey.
