= Eurysacca quinoae =

Scientific classification
- Kingdom: Animalia
- Phylum: Arthropoda
- Clade: Pancrustacea
- Class: Insecta
- Order: Lepidoptera
- Family: Gelechiidae
- Genus: Eurysacca
- Species: E. quinoae

Binomial name
- Eurysacca quinoae Povolný, 1997

Species of moth

Eurysacca quinoae is a moth in the family Gelechiidae. It was described by Povolný in 1997. It is found in Bolivia.

This species is known to attack quinoa (Chenopodium quinoa).
