= Epimesophleps aphridias =

Scientific classification
- Domain: Eukaryota
- Kingdom: Animalia
- Phylum: Arthropoda
- Class: Insecta
- Order: Lepidoptera
- Family: Gelechiidae
- Genus: Epimesophleps
- Species: E. aphridias

Binomial name
- Epimesophleps aphridias Rebel, 1925

Species of moth

Epimesophleps aphridias is a moth in the family Gelechiidae. It was described by Hans Rebel in 1925. It is found in Egypt.
