= Tosca plutonella =

Scientific classification
- Domain: Eukaryota
- Kingdom: Animalia
- Phylum: Arthropoda
- Class: Insecta
- Order: Lepidoptera
- Family: Gelechiidae
- Genus: Tosca
- Species: T. plutonella

Binomial name
- Tosca plutonella Heinrich, 1920

Species of moth

Tosca plutonella is a moth of the family Gelechiidae. It was described by Carl Heinrich in 1920. It is found in North America, where it has been recorded from New Mexico.

The wingspan is about 8 mm. The forewings are white, rather densely dusted with black and blackish-fuscous scales. There are three conspicuous sub-dorsal black dots and on the middle of the cell and near the middle of the costa the black scaling is also more pronounced but does not form definite spots or other markings. The hindwings are pale whitish fuscous, somewhat darker toward the apex.

The larvae feed on Prunus species. They mine the leaves of their host plant. The mine is irregular, with several branching galleries. It begins along the mid-rib and sometimes develops into a blotch, but normally is more or less linear. At the end against the midrib is a hole from which the larva discharges its frass and adjacent to this hole along the midrib is a fine silken web under which the larva retires when not feeding. Full-grown larvae reach a length of 6 mm. They have a yellowish-white body, faintly tinged with pink on dorsal surface, and a dark brown head.
