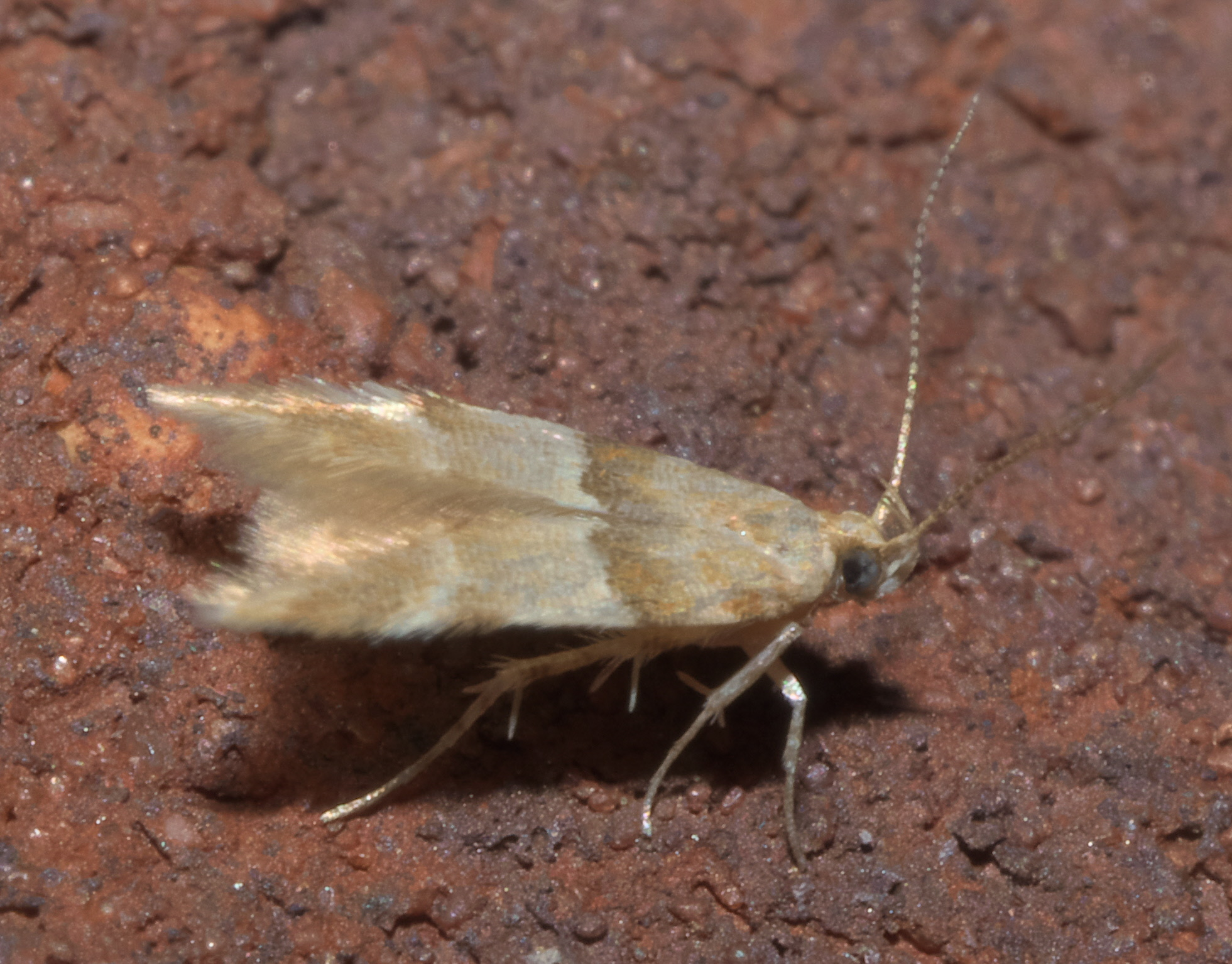

Scientific classification
- Kingdom: Animalia
- Phylum: Arthropoda
- Clade: Pancrustacea
- Class: Insecta
- Order: Lepidoptera
- Family: Gelechiidae
- Subfamily: Anomologinae
- Genus: Theisoa; Chambers, 1874

Synonyms
- Helice Chambers, 1873 (preocc. de Haan, 1835); Cacelice Busck, 1902

= Theisoa (moth) =

Genus of moths

Theisoa is a genus of moth in the family Gelechiidae.

== Species ==
- Theisoa constrictella (Zeller, 1873)
- Theisoa multifasciella Chambers, 1875
- Theisoa pallidochrella (Chambers, 1873)
