= Dirhinosia cervinella =

Scientific classification
- Kingdom: Animalia
- Phylum: Arthropoda
- Class: Insecta
- Order: Lepidoptera
- Family: Gelechiidae
- Genus: Dirhinosia
- Species: D. cervinella

Binomial name
- Dirhinosia cervinella (Eversmann, 1844)

Synonyms
- Lita cervinella Eversmann, 1844; Dirhinosia trifasciella Rebel, 1905

Species of moth

Dirhinosia cervinella is a moth of the family Gelechiidae. It is found in Russia (the southern Ural, the Caucasus, Altai, Lower Volga), Ukraine, Bulgaria, Hungary, Croatia and Turkey.

The wingspan is 16–18 mm. Adults have been recorded on wing from June to July.
