= Gladiovalva pseudodorsella =

Scientific classification
- Kingdom: Animalia
- Phylum: Arthropoda
- Class: Insecta
- Order: Lepidoptera
- Family: Gelechiidae
- Genus: Gladiovalva
- Species: G. pseudodorsella

Binomial name
- Gladiovalva pseudodorsella Sattler, 1960

Species of moth

Gladiovalva pseudodorsella is a moth of the family Gelechiidae. It was described by Sattler in 1960. It is found in Morocco.
