= Chorivalva bisaccula =

Scientific classification
- Domain: Eukaryota
- Kingdom: Animalia
- Phylum: Arthropoda
- Class: Insecta
- Order: Lepidoptera
- Family: Gelechiidae
- Genus: Chorivalva
- Species: C. bisaccula

Binomial name
- Chorivalva bisaccula Omelko, 1988

Species of moth

Chorivalva bisaccula is a moth of the family Gelechiidae. It is found in Korea, the Russian Far East and Japan.

The wingspan is 10–13 mm.

The larvae feed on Quercus mongolica and Quercus acutissima.
