= Caulastrocecis perexigella =

Scientific classification
- Kingdom: Animalia
- Phylum: Arthropoda
- Clade: Pancrustacea
- Class: Insecta
- Order: Lepidoptera
- Family: Gelechiidae
- Genus: Caulastrocecis
- Species: C. perexigella

Binomial name
- Caulastrocecis perexigella Junnilainen, 2010

Species of moth

Caulastrocecis perexigella is a moth of the family Gelechiidae. It is found in Russia (the southern Ural).

The wingspan is 8.5–9.5 mm.
