= Horridovalva =

Scientific classification
- Kingdom: Animalia
- Phylum: Arthropoda
- Clade: Pancrustacea
- Class: Insecta
- Order: Lepidoptera
- Family: Gelechiidae
- Subfamily: Anomologinae
- Genus: Horridovalva; Sattler, 1967

Synonyms
- Struempelia Amsel, 1977

Genus of moths

Horridovalva is a genus of moths in the family Gelechiidae.

== Species ==
- Horridovalva renatella (Amsel, 1978)
- Horridovalva tenuiella Sattler, 1967
