= Nealyda phytolaccae =

Scientific classification
- Domain: Eukaryota
- Kingdom: Animalia
- Phylum: Arthropoda
- Class: Insecta
- Order: Lepidoptera
- Family: Gelechiidae
- Genus: Nealyda
- Species: N. phytolaccae

Binomial name
- Nealyda phytolaccae Clarke, 1946

Species of moth

Nealyda phytolaccae is a moth of the family Gelechiidae. It was described by Clarke in 1946. It is found in North America, where it has been recorded from Florida.

The larvae feed on Phytolacca decandra.
