= Spiniductellus atraphaxi =

Scientific classification
- Kingdom: Animalia
- Phylum: Arthropoda
- Clade: Pancrustacea
- Class: Insecta
- Order: Lepidoptera
- Family: Gelechiidae
- Genus: Spiniductellus
- Species: S. atraphaxi

Binomial name
- Spiniductellus atraphaxi Bidzilya & Karsholt, 2008

Species of moth

Spiniductellus atraphaxi is a moth of the family Gelechiidae. It is found in Tajikistan.

The wingspan is 15–16 mm. Adults are on wing in mid-July.

The larvae feed on Atraphaxis pyrifolia.
