= Ephelictis megalarthra =

Scientific classification
- Kingdom: Animalia
- Phylum: Arthropoda
- Class: Insecta
- Order: Lepidoptera
- Family: Gelechiidae
- Genus: Ephelictis
- Species: E. megalarthra

Binomial name
- Ephelictis megalarthra Meyrick, 1904

Species of moth

Ephelictis megalarthra is a moth in the family Gelechiidae. It was described by Edward Meyrick in 1904. It is found in Australia, where it has been recorded from Western Australia.

The wingspan is 17–19 mm (0.67–0.75 in). The forewings are pale shining grey, sprinkled with darker grey and a few blackish scales. There is a broad white costal streak from the base to three-fourths, posteriorly suffused. The stigmata are small and blackish, the plical obliquely beyond the first discal, an additional dot between and above the first and second discal. There are also minute dots of blackish scales along the posterior part of the costa and termen. The hindwings are whitish.
