= Epimimastis tegminata =

Scientific classification
- Kingdom: Animalia
- Phylum: Arthropoda
- Class: Insecta
- Order: Lepidoptera
- Family: Gelechiidae
- Genus: Epimimastis
- Species: E. tegminata

Binomial name
- Epimimastis tegminata Meyrick, 1916

Species of moth

Epimimastis tegminata is a moth in the family Gelechiidae. It was described by Edward Meyrick in 1916. It is found in Australia, where it has been recorded from Queensland.

The wingspan is about 11 mm. The forewings are brownish ochreous with the plical and first discal stigmata blackish, the plical rather posterior. There are three or four cloudy wedge-shaped blackish marks on the posterior half of the costa and a terminal streak of blackish irroration (sprinkles), including a fine whitish line just before the margin. The hindwings are grey, with the veins darker, towards the base thinly scaled and on the dorsum tinged with pale yellowish.
