= Narthecoceros platyconta =

Scientific classification
- Kingdom: Animalia
- Phylum: Arthropoda
- Class: Insecta
- Order: Lepidoptera
- Family: Gelechiidae
- Genus: Narthecoceros
- Species: N. platyconta

Binomial name
- Narthecoceros platyconta (Meyrick, 1905)

Synonyms
- Macrotona platyconta Meyrick, 1905

Species of moth

Narthecoceros platyconta is a moth in the family Gelechiidae. It was described by Edward Meyrick in 1905. It is found in Sri Lanka.

The wingspan is 16–20 mm. The forewings are ochreous whitish, towards the costa and dorsum tinged and sprinkled with fuscous, the costa posteriorly more or less suffused with fuscous. There are some scattered blackish or dark fuscous scales on the submedian fold and irregular groups of black and dark fuscous somewhat raised scales representing the stigmata, with the plical before the first discal. The hindwings are light fuscous.
