= Spiniphallellus =

Scientific classification
- Kingdom: Animalia
- Phylum: Arthropoda
- Clade: Pancrustacea
- Class: Insecta
- Order: Lepidoptera
- Family: Gelechiidae
- Subfamily: Anomologinae
- Genus: Spiniphallellus; Bidzilya & Karsholt, 2008

Genus of moths

Spiniphallellus is a genus of moths in the family Gelechiidae.

== Species ==
- Spiniphallellus desertus Bidzilya & Karsholt, 2008
- Spiniphallellus fuscescens Bidzilya & Karsholt, 2008
- Spiniphallellus stonisi Bidzilya & Karsholt, 2008
