= Epimimastis emblematica =

Scientific classification
- Kingdom: Animalia
- Phylum: Arthropoda
- Class: Insecta
- Order: Lepidoptera
- Family: Gelechiidae
- Genus: Epimimastis
- Species: E. emblematica

Binomial name
- Epimimastis emblematica Meyrick, 1916

Species of moth

Epimimastis emblematica is a moth in the family Gelechiidae. It was described by Edward Meyrick in 1916. It is found in Assam, India.

The wingspan is 13–14 mm. The forewings are pale ochreous yellowish, with some scattered dark fuscous specks and a blackish mark on the base of the costa. There are small wedge-shaped blackish spots on the costa at one-fifth and two-fifths. A triangular blackish-grey blotch is found on the costa about two-thirds, reaching halfway across the wing and becoming pale brownish ochreous at the apex and a small blackish mark on the costa just beyond this, as well as a pale brownish-ochreous irregular transverse blotch crossing the fold at two-fifths of the wing, irregularly edged with dark fuscous specks. A small blackish-grey spot is found on the dorsum towards the tornus and there is an irregular dark fuscous streak along the termen. The hindwings are light grey.
