= Nealyda accincta =

Scientific classification
- Kingdom: Animalia
- Phylum: Arthropoda
- Class: Insecta
- Order: Lepidoptera
- Family: Gelechiidae
- Genus: Nealyda
- Species: N. accincta

Binomial name
- Nealyda accincta Meyrick, 1923

Species of moth

Nealyda accincta is a moth of the family Gelechiidae. It was described by Edward Meyrick in 1923. It is found in Amazonas, Brazil.

The wingspan is about 8 mm. The basal half of the forewings is yellow ochreous suffused with grey towards the costa and posteriorly, limited by a moderately broad light blue-leaden-metallic straight postmedian fascia. The remainder of the wing is dark grey irrorated (sprinkled) with black, a spot of bronzy-fuscous suffusion in the disc beyond the fascia, and fine leaden-metallic lines from before and beyond the tornus converging to a point on the costa at five-sixths, as well as a small ochreous spot almost at the apex. The hindwings are dark fuscous.
