= Ethirostoma interpolata =

Scientific classification
- Kingdom: Animalia
- Phylum: Arthropoda
- Class: Insecta
- Order: Lepidoptera
- Family: Gelechiidae
- Genus: Ethirostoma
- Species: E. interpolata

Binomial name
- Ethirostoma interpolata Meyrick, 1922

Species of moth

Ethirostoma interpolata is a moth in the family Gelechiidae. It was described by Edward Meyrick in 1922. It is found in Brazil and Peru.

The wingspan is about 9 mm. The forewings are brownish fuscous, the tips of the scales minutely whitish, forming a very fine transverse striation. There are dark fuscous dots towards the costa near the base and at one-fifth and one-third, and two above and below the fold at one-fourth. The stigmata are dark fuscous, the plical rather obliquely before the first discal. There is a gradually expanded streak of dark fuscous suffusion along the costa from one-third to the subterminal line, cut by an oblique white strigula from the middle of the costa. There is also a nearly straight whitish line from four-fifths of the costa to the tornus, hardly angulated in the middle, beyond the angle a short black dash, sometimes a second more minute indicated beneath it. The hindwings are dark grey.
