= Phanerophalla =

Scientific classification
- Kingdom: Animalia
- Phylum: Arthropoda
- Class: Insecta
- Order: Lepidoptera
- Family: Gelechiidae
- Subfamily: Anomologinae
- Genus: Phanerophalla; Janse, 1960
- Species: P. knysnaensis

Binomial name
- Phanerophalla knysnaensis Janse, 1960

Genus of moths

Phanerophalla is a genus of moth in the family Gelechiidae. It contains the species Phanerophalla knysnaensis, which is found in South Africa.
