= Spiniphallellus desertus =

Scientific classification
- Kingdom: Animalia
- Phylum: Arthropoda
- Clade: Pancrustacea
- Class: Insecta
- Order: Lepidoptera
- Family: Gelechiidae
- Genus: Spiniphallellus
- Species: S. desertus

Binomial name
- Spiniphallellus desertus Bidzilya & Karsholt, 2008

Species of moth

Spiniphallellus desertus is a moth of the family Gelechiidae. It is found in Uzbekistan, Turkmenistan, Kazakhstan and Russia.
