= Eurysacca novalis =

Scientific classification
- Kingdom: Animalia
- Phylum: Arthropoda
- Clade: Pancrustacea
- Class: Insecta
- Order: Lepidoptera
- Family: Gelechiidae
- Genus: Eurysacca
- Species: E. novalis

Binomial name
- Eurysacca novalis Povolný, 1989

Species of moth

Eurysacca novalis is a moth in the family Gelechiidae. It was described by Povolný in 1989. It is found in Argentina.
