= Nealyda kinzelella =

Scientific classification
- Domain: Eukaryota
- Kingdom: Animalia
- Phylum: Arthropoda
- Class: Insecta
- Order: Lepidoptera
- Family: Gelechiidae
- Genus: Nealyda
- Species: N. kinzelella

Binomial name
- Nealyda kinzelella Busck, 1900

Species of moth

Nealyda kinzelella is a moth of the family Gelechiidae. It was described by August Busck in 1900. It is found in North America, where it has been recorded from Florida.

The wingspan is 5.5-6.5 mm. The basal half of the forewings is light brown, the color gradually becoming darker outwardly and terminating in a deep velvety brown. There is a transverse fascia at the middle of the wing, on the outside edged with a thin line of white scales. The fascia is more thickly scaled than the rest of the wing and protrudes in a small dorsal scale tooth. The ground color of the apical half of the wing is silvery white, thickly suffused with black, fuscous and bluish scales. An ill-defined group of dark scales at beginning of cilia is edged below with a few brown scales. Another at the apex also has a few brown scales below. At the tornus is a nearly black spot and the entire apical edge is nearly black. The hindwings are silvery gray.

The larvae feed on Guapira obtusata. They mine the leaves of their host plant, creating upper surface, trumpet-formed blotch mines. Pupation takes place outside of the mine in a snow white cocoon.

== Etymology ==
The species is named in honour of botanist Mr. F. Kinzel.
