= Empedaula insipiens =

Scientific classification
- Domain: Eukaryota
- Kingdom: Animalia
- Phylum: Arthropoda
- Class: Insecta
- Order: Lepidoptera
- Family: Gelechiidae
- Genus: Empedaula
- Species: E. insipiens

Binomial name
- Empedaula insipiens Meyrick, 1918

Species of moth

Empedaula insipiens is a moth in the family Gelechiidae. It was described by Edward Meyrick in 1918. It is found in Bengal.

The wingspan is about 12 mm. The forewings are whitish ochreous suffusedly irrorated (sprinkled) with fuscous and with some irregular dark fuscous markings towards the base, on the dorsum forming a suffused patch extending to one-third. There is a narrow oblique dark fuscous fascia from the costa about one-third, not reaching the dorsum, anteriorly edged by a whitish line continued on the dorsum around its lower extremity, posteriorly suffused. There is also an elongate dark fuscous mark in the middle of the disc, with crescentic whitish edging above. A trapezoidal dark fuscous blotch is found on the costa about three-fourths, narrowed downwards, anteriorly edged whitish, and posteriorly by an inwards-oblique whitish line continued to the dorsum before the tornus, followed in the middle by a blackish dash. The hindwings are grey.
