= Epimimastis porphyroloma =

Scientific classification
- Kingdom: Animalia
- Phylum: Arthropoda
- Clade: Pancrustacea
- Class: Insecta
- Order: Lepidoptera
- Family: Gelechiidae
- Genus: Epimimastis
- Species: E. porphyroloma

Binomial name
- Epimimastis porphyroloma (Lower, 1897)

Synonyms
- Gelechia porphyroloma Lower, 1897

Species of moth

Epimimastis porphyroloma is a moth in the family Gelechiidae. It was described by Oswald Bertram Lower in 1897. It is found in Australia, where it has been recorded from Queensland, New South Wales, Victoria, South Australia and Tasmania.

The wingspan is 11–16 mm (0.43–0.63 in). The forewings are deep orange yellow with a rather dark purplish-fuscous apical blotch, the anterior edge convex, running from three-fourths of the costa to before the tornus, marked with blackish fuscous on the lower three-fifths, suffused into the ground colour towards the costa. The hindwings are fuscous, darker posteriorly.
