= Dorycnopa =

Scientific classification
- Domain: Eukaryota
- Kingdom: Animalia
- Phylum: Arthropoda
- Class: Insecta
- Order: Lepidoptera
- Family: Gelechiidae
- Subfamily: Anomologinae
- Genus: Dorycnopa; Lower, 1901

Synonyms
- Bactrolopha Lower, 1901

Genus of moths

Dorycnopa is a genus of moths in the family Gelechiidae.

== Species ==
- Dorycnopa heliochares (Lower, 1900)
- Dorycnopa marmorea (Lower, 1899)
- Dorycnopa orthodesma (Lower, 1901)
- Dorycnopa triphera Lower, 1920
