= Erythriastis =

Scientific classification
- Domain: Eukaryota
- Kingdom: Animalia
- Phylum: Arthropoda
- Class: Insecta
- Order: Lepidoptera
- Family: Gelechiidae
- Subfamily: Gelechiinae
- Genus: Erythriastis; Meyrick, 1925

Genus of moths

Erythriastis is a genus of moths in the family Gelechiidae.

== Species ==
- Erythriastis rhodocrossa (Meyrick, 1914)
- Erythriastis rubentula (Meyrick, 1914)
