= Numata (moth) =

Scientific classification
- Kingdom: Animalia
- Phylum: Arthropoda
- Class: Insecta
- Order: Lepidoptera
- Family: Gelechiidae
- Subfamily: Anomologinae
- Genus: Numata; Busck, 1906
- Species: N. bipunctella

Binomial name
- Numata bipunctella Busck, 1906

Genus of moths

Numata is a genus of moth in the family Gelechiidae. It contains the species Numata bipunctella, which is found in North America, where it has been recorded from Texas.

The wingspan is 9 mm for males and 11 mm for females. The forewings are whitish straw-yellow, slightly darker toward the apex, sparsely sprinkled with dark brown atoms and with two conspicuous black dots, one on the middle of the cell and the other at the end of the cell.

== See also ==
- Lepidoptera
