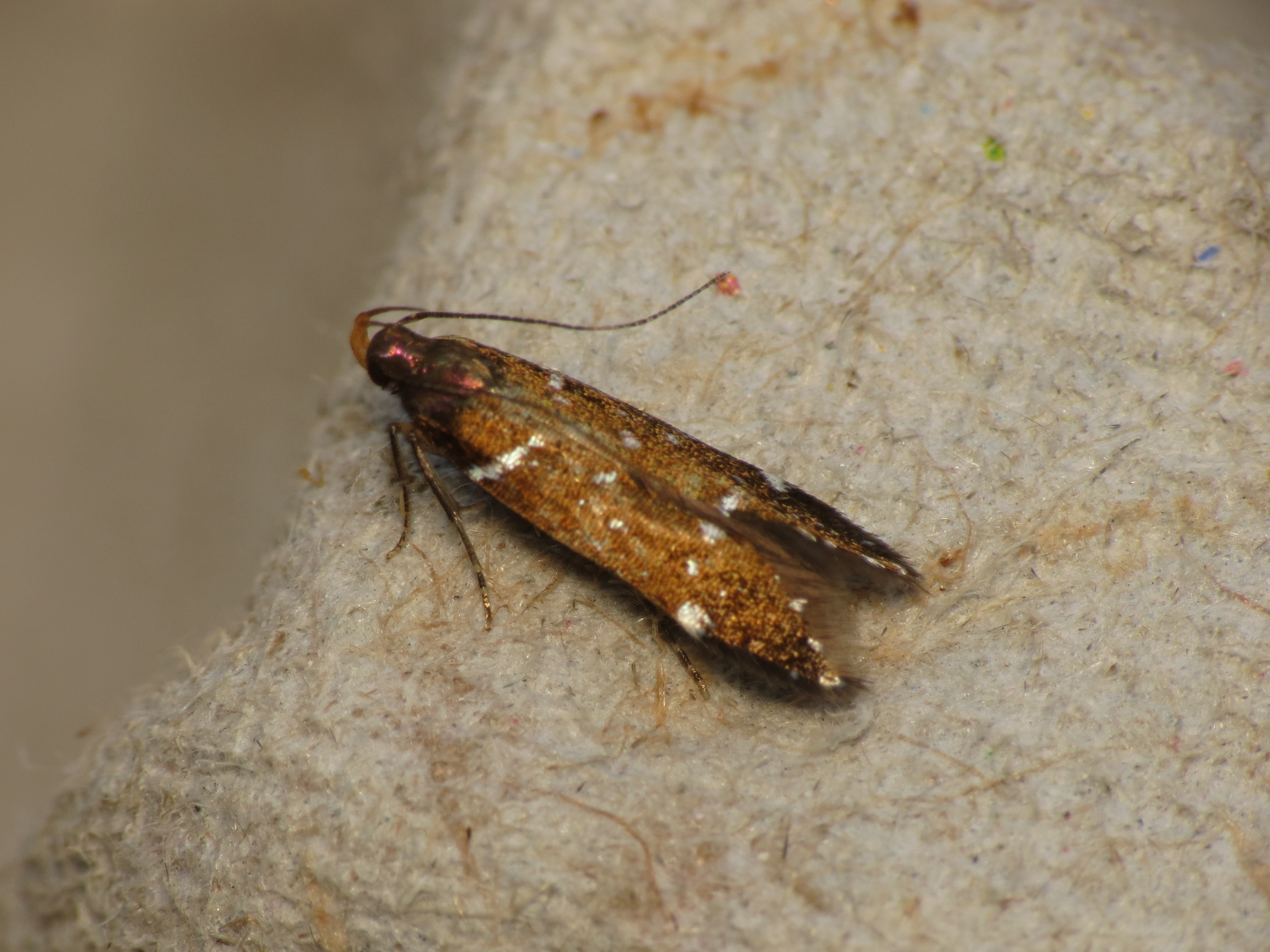
- Argolamprotes micella

Scientific classification
- Domain: Eukaryota
- Kingdom: Animalia
- Phylum: Arthropoda
- Class: Insecta
- Order: Lepidoptera
- Family: Gelechiidae
- Genus: Argolamprotes; Benander, 1945

= Argolamprotes =

Genus of moths

Argolamprotes is a genus of moths in the family Gelechiidae.

== Species ==
- Argolamprotes micella (Denis & Schiffermüller, 1775)
