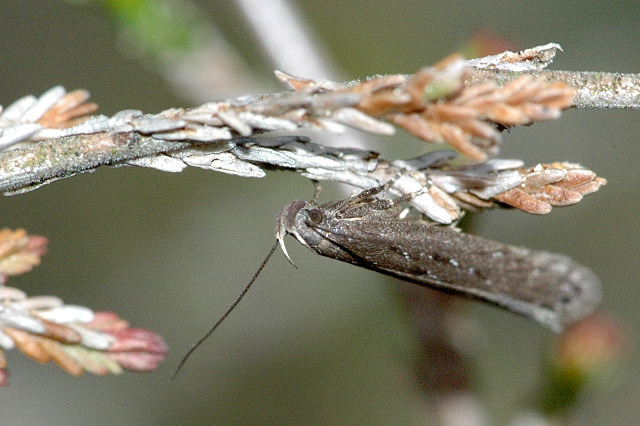
- Neofaculta ericetella

Scientific classification
- Kingdom: Animalia
- Phylum: Arthropoda
- Clade: Pancrustacea
- Class: Insecta
- Order: Lepidoptera
- Family: Gelechiidae
- Tribe: Chelariini
- Genus: Neofaculta; Gozmany, 1955

= Neofaculta =

Genus of moths

Neofaculta is a genus of moth in the family Gelechiidae.

== Species ==
- Neofaculta confidella (Rebel, 1936)
- Neofaculta ericetella
- Neofaculta infernella
- Neofaculta taigana Ponomarenko, 1998

== Former species ==
- Neofaculta quinquemaculella (Bruand, 1859)
