= Ephelictis =

Scientific classification
- Kingdom: Animalia
- Phylum: Arthropoda
- Clade: Pancrustacea
- Class: Insecta
- Order: Lepidoptera
- Family: Gelechiidae
- Subfamily: Gelechiinae
- Genus: Ephelictis; Meyrick, 1904

Genus of moths

Ephelictis is a genus of moths in the family Gelechiidae.

== Species ==
- Ephelictis neochalca Meyrick, 1904
- Ephelictis megalarthra Meyrick, 1904
