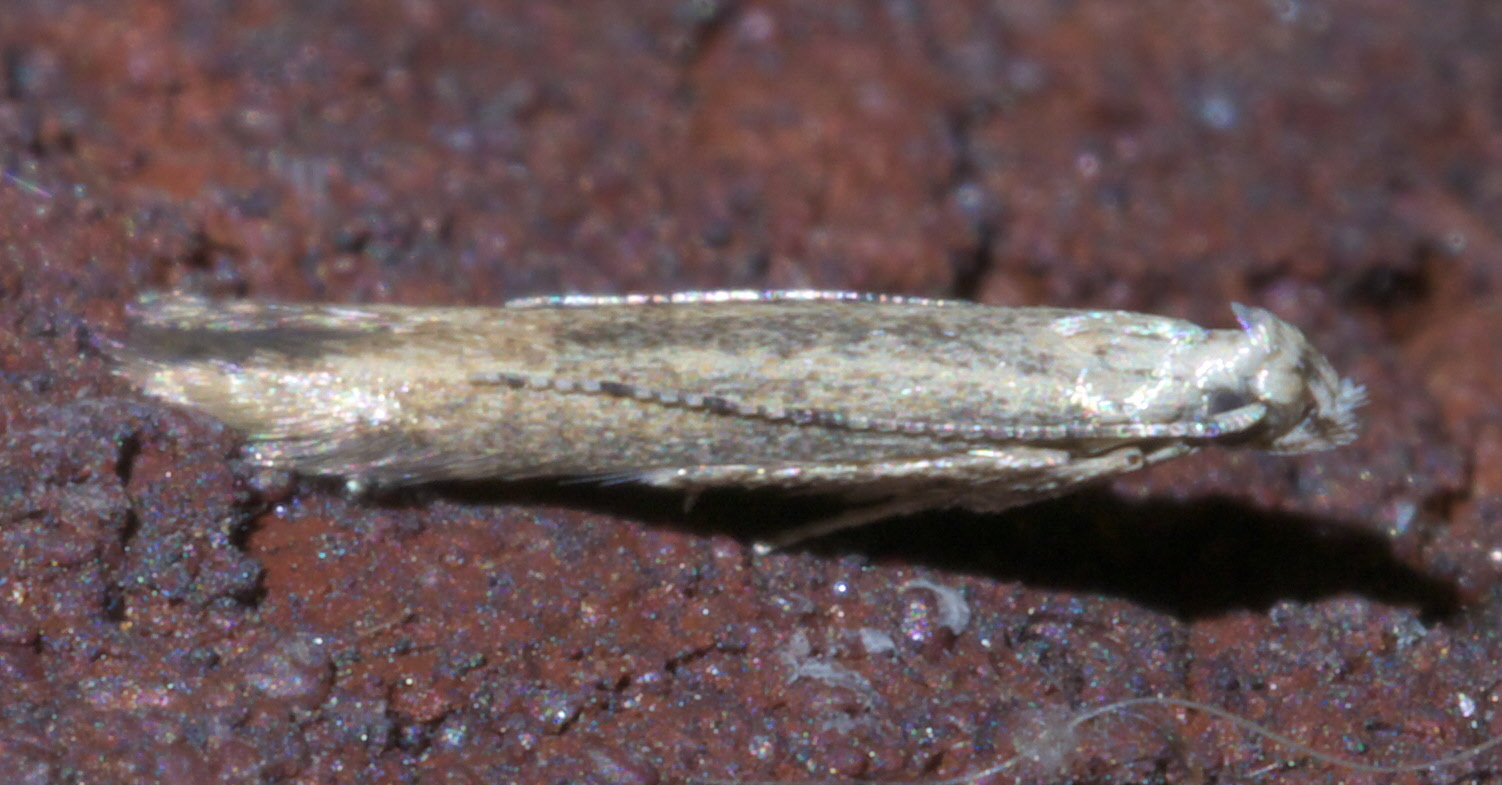

Scientific classification
- Domain: Eukaryota
- Kingdom: Animalia
- Phylum: Arthropoda
- Class: Insecta
- Order: Lepidoptera
- Family: Gelechiidae
- Tribe: Anomologini
- Genus: Stereomita; Braun, 1922
- Species: S. andropogonis

Binomial name
- Stereomita andropogonis Braun, 1922

= Stereomita =

Genus of moths

Stereomita is a genus of moths in the family Gelechiidae. It contains the species Stereomita andropogonis, which is found in most of eastern North America.

The wingspan is 8.5-9.5 mm. The forewings are pale ochreous, deepest toward the apex, and dusted with dark brown scales, most densely on the costal and dorsal margins with a tendency to longitudinal streaking. At two-thirds of the costa, the dusting usually forms two diffuse oblique streaks. Along the termen, there is a series of indistinct brownish dots, and opposite the extreme apex, in the cilia, a transverse brownish spot. The hindwings are pale brown.
