= Ischnocraspedus =

Scientific classification
- Kingdom: Animalia
- Phylum: Arthropoda
- Class: Insecta
- Order: Lepidoptera
- Family: Gelechiidae
- Genus: Ischnocraspedus; Janse, 1958
- Species: I. peracuta

Binomial name
- Ischnocraspedus peracuta (Meyrick, 1920)

Synonyms
- Megacraspedus peracuta Meyrick, 1920

Genus of moths

Ischnocraspedus is a genus of moths in the family Gelechiidae. It contains the species Ischnocraspedus peracuta, which is found in South Africa.

The wingspan is 11–13 mm. The forewings are yellow-ochreous, sometimes tinged with grey posteriorly. The costal edge is white on the basal third. The hindwings are grey.
