= Paranarsia =

Paranarsia joannisiella

Scientific classification
- Domain: Eukaryota
- Kingdom: Animalia
- Phylum: Arthropoda
- Class: Insecta
- Order: Lepidoptera
- Family: Gelechiidae
- Tribe: Anomologini
- Genus: Paranarsia; Ragonot, 1895
- Species: P. joannisiella

Binomial name
- Paranarsia joannisiella Ragonot, 1895

Genus of moths

Paranarsia joannisiella is a species of moth in the family Gelechiidae. It is the only species in the genus Paranarsia. It is found in Spain, France, Switzerland, Austria, Italy and Slovenia.

The wingspan is about 12 mm.

The larvae possibly feed on Poaceae species.
