= Epimesophleps =

Scientific classification
- Domain: Eukaryota
- Kingdom: Animalia
- Phylum: Arthropoda
- Class: Insecta
- Order: Lepidoptera
- Family: Gelechiidae
- Subfamily: Gelechiinae
- Genus: Epimesophleps; Rebel, 1907

Genus of moths

Epimesophleps is a genus of moths in the family Gelechiidae.

== Species ==
- Epimesophleps aphridias Rebel, 1925
- Epimesophleps symmocella Rebel, 1907
