= Ethirostoma =

Scientific classification
- Domain: Eukaryota
- Kingdom: Animalia
- Phylum: Arthropoda
- Class: Insecta
- Order: Lepidoptera
- Family: Gelechiidae
- Subfamily: Gelechiinae
- Genus: Ethirostoma; Meyrick, 1914

Genus of moths

Ethirostoma is a genus of moths in the family Gelechiidae.

== Species ==
- Ethirostoma interpolata Meyrick, 1922
- Ethirostoma semiacma Meyrick, 1914
