= Exceptia =

Scientific classification
- Kingdom: Animalia
- Phylum: Arthropoda
- Clade: Pancrustacea
- Class: Insecta
- Order: Lepidoptera
- Family: Gelechiidae
- Tribe: Gnorimoschemini
- Genus: Exceptia; Povolný, 1967

Genus of moths

Exceptia is a genus of moths in the family Gelechiidae.

== Species ==
- Exceptia neopetrella (Keifer, 1936)
- Exceptia hospita Povolný, 1989
- Exceptia sisterina Powell & Povolný, 2001
