= Chorivalva =

Scientific classification
- Domain: Eukaryota
- Kingdom: Animalia
- Phylum: Arthropoda
- Class: Insecta
- Order: Lepidoptera
- Family: Gelechiidae
- Subfamily: Gelechiinae
- Tribe: Litini
- Genus: Chorivalva; Omelko, 1988

Synonyms
- Neochronistis Park, 1989

Genus of moths

Chorivalva is a genus of moths in the class Gelechiidae.

== Species ==
- Chorivalva bisaccula Omelko, 1988
- Chorivalva grandialata Omelko, 1988
- Chorivalva unisaccula Omelko, 1988
