= Spiniductellus =

Scientific classification
- Kingdom: Animalia
- Phylum: Arthropoda
- Clade: Pancrustacea
- Class: Insecta
- Order: Lepidoptera
- Family: Gelechiidae
- Genus: Spiniductellus; Bidzilya & Karsholt, 2008

Genus of moths

Spiniductellus is a genus of moths in the family Gelechiidae.

== Species ==
- Spiniductellus atraphaxi Bidzilya & Karsholt, 2008
- Spiniductellus flavonigrum Bidzilya & Karsholt, 2008
