= Eurysacca =

Scientific classification
- Kingdom: Animalia
- Phylum: Arthropoda
- Clade: Pancrustacea
- Class: Insecta
- Order: Lepidoptera
- Family: Gelechiidae
- Tribe: Gnorimoschemini
- Genus: Eurysacca; Povolný, 1967

Genus of moths

Eurysacca is a genus of moths in the family Gelechiidae.

== Species ==
- Eurysacca acutivalva Povolný, 1986
- Eurysacca albonigra Povolný, 1986
- Eurysacca annulata Povolný, 1986
- Eurysacca atrata Povolný, 1986
- Eurysacca boertmanni Povolný, 1990
- Eurysacca chili (Povolný, 1967)
- Eurysacca danorum Povolný, 1986
- Eurysacca excisa Povolný, 1986
- Eurysacca gnorimina Povolný, 1986
- Eurysacca media Povolný, 1986
- Eurysacca melanocampta (Meyrick, 1917)
- Eurysacca melanopicta Povolný, 1986
- Eurysacca minima Povolný, 1986
- Eurysacca novalis Povolný, 1989
- Eurysacca paleana Povolný, 1986
- Eurysacca parvula Povolný, 1986
- Eurysacca splendida Povolný, 1986
- Eurysacca subatrata Povolný, 1986
- Eurysacca subsplendida Povolný, 1986
- Eurysacca quinoae Povolný, 1997
- Eurysacca tenebrosa Povolný, 1986
- Eurysacca vera Povolný, 1990
