= Chorivalva grandialata =

Scientific classification
- Domain: Eukaryota
- Kingdom: Animalia
- Phylum: Arthropoda
- Class: Insecta
- Order: Lepidoptera
- Family: Gelechiidae
- Genus: Chorivalva
- Species: C. grandialata

Binomial name
- Chorivalva grandialata Omelko, 1988

Species of moth

Chorivalva grandialata is a moth of the family Gelechiidae. It is found in Korea and the Russian Far East.
