= Atremaea =

Scientific classification
- Domain: Eukaryota
- Kingdom: Animalia
- Phylum: Arthropoda
- Class: Insecta
- Order: Lepidoptera
- Family: Gelechiidae
- Tribe: Anomologini
- Genus: Atremaea; Staudinger, 1871

Synonyms
- Calamotypa Meyrick, 1926

Genus of moths

Atremaea is a genus of moths in the family Gelechiidae.

== Species ==
- Atremaea lonchoptera Staudinger, 1871
