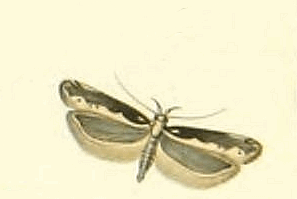
- Gladiovalva rumicivorella

Scientific classification
- Kingdom: Animalia
- Phylum: Arthropoda
- Class: Insecta
- Order: Lepidoptera
- Family: Gelechiidae
- Tribe: Anomologini
- Genus: Gladiovalva; Sattler, 1960

= Gladiovalva =

Genus of moths

Gladiovalva is a genus of moths in the family Gelechiidae.

== Species ==
- Gladiovalva rumicivorella (Millière, 1881)
- Gladiovalva aizpuruai Vives, 1990
- Gladiovalva badidorsella (Rebel, 1935)
- Gladiovalva ignorella Falkovitsh & Bidzilya, 2003
- Gladiovalva pseudodorsella Sattler, 1960
