= Ivanauskiella =

Scientific classification
- Kingdom: Animalia
- Phylum: Arthropoda
- Clade: Pancrustacea
- Class: Insecta
- Order: Lepidoptera
- Family: Gelechiidae
- Tribe: Anomologini
- Genus: Ivanauskiella; Ivinskis & Piskunov, 1980

Genus of moths

Ivanauskiella is a genus of moths in the family Gelechiidae.

== Species ==
- Ivanauskiella psamathias (Meyrick, 1895)
