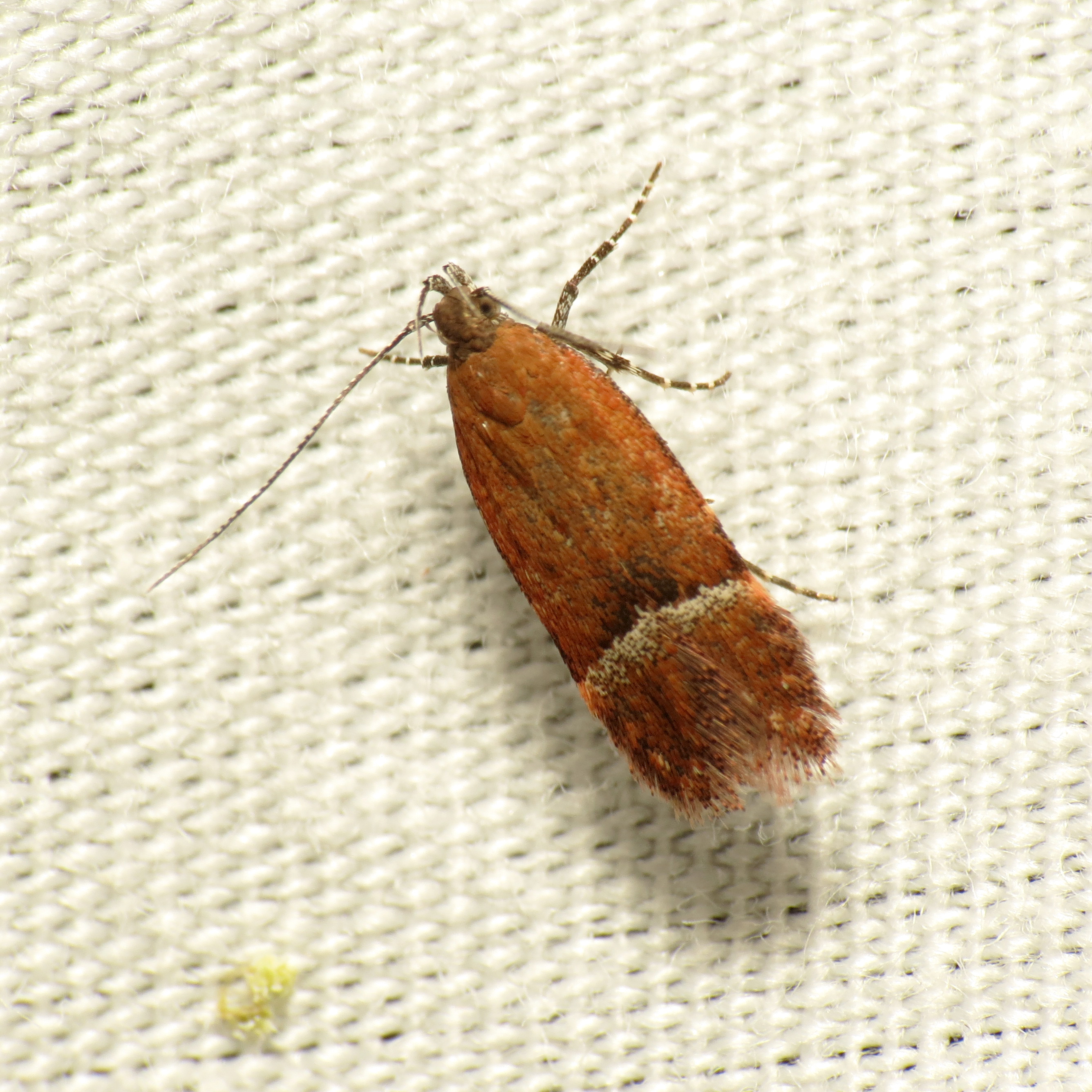
- Gelechiid Moth (Eudactylota)

Scientific classification
- Domain: Eukaryota
- Kingdom: Animalia
- Phylum: Arthropoda
- Class: Insecta
- Order: Lepidoptera
- Family: Gelechiidae
- Tribe: Gelechiini
- Genus: Eudactylota; Walsingham, 1911

= Eudactylota =

Genus of moths

Eudactylota is a genus of moths in the family Gelechiidae.

== Species ==
- Eudactylota abstemia Hodges, 1966
- Eudactylota barberella (Busck, 1903)
- Eudactylota diadota Hodges, 1966
- Eudactylota iobapta (Meyrick, 1927)
