= Ptycerata =

Scientific classification
- Domain: Eukaryota
- Kingdom: Animalia
- Phylum: Arthropoda
- Class: Insecta
- Order: Lepidoptera
- Family: Gelechiidae
- Tribe: Anomologini
- Genus: Ptycerata; Ely, 1910
- Species: P. busckella

Binomial name
- Ptycerata busckella Ely, 1910

Genus of moths

Ptycerata is a genus of moth in the family Gelechiidae. It contains only one species Ptycerata busckella, which is found in North America, where it has been recorded from Connecticut, Illinois, Maine, New Jersey, Ohio and Pennsylvania.

The wingspan is 14–15 mm. The forewings are creamy white, with three small, somewhat elongate brown spots, one on the middle of the wing, another on the fold below the first and nearer the base of the wing, the third at the end of the cell. The hindwings are smoky yellow.

== Etymology ==
The species is named in honor of Mr. August Busck.
