= Narthecoceros =

Scientific classification
- Kingdom: Animalia
- Phylum: Arthropoda
- Class: Insecta
- Order: Lepidoptera
- Family: Gelechiidae
- Subfamily: Gelechiinae
- Genus: Narthecoceros; Meyrick, 1906

Genus of moths

Narthecoceros is a genus of moth in the family Gelechiidae. They are found in Sri Lanka

== Species ==
- Narthecoceros logica Meyrick, 1910
- Narthecoceros platyconta (Meyrick, 1905)
- Narthecoceros xylodes Meyrick, 1906
