= Leptogeneia =

Scientific classification
- Kingdom: Animalia
- Phylum: Arthropoda
- Class: Insecta
- Order: Lepidoptera
- Family: Gelechiidae
- Tribe: Anomologini
- Genus: Leptogeneia; Meyrick, 1904
- Species: L. bicristata

Binomial name
- Leptogeneia bicristata Meyrick, 1904

Genus of moths

Leptogeneia is a genus of moth in the family Gelechiidae. It contains the species Leptogeneia bicristata, which is found in Australia, where it has been recorded from New South Wales.

The wingspan is 11–13 mm (0.43–0.51 in). The forewings are shining whitish, sprinkled with fuscous and with the veins indistinctly streaked with dark fuscous in the disc and posteriorly. There is a short dark fuscous mark from the costa near the base and a yellow-whitish scale-tuft on the fold at two-fifths, edged anteriorly with dark fuscous. A whitish-yellow transverse streak of raised scales from the tornus, reaching three-fourths across the wing, is irregularly edged anteriorly with dark fuscous, and above touches a costal spot of dark fuscous suffusion. Beyond this is an oblique white streak from the costa to the termen beneath the apex and the costal area above this is suffused with dark fuscous. The hindwings are grey.
