= Euryctista =

Scientific classification
- Domain: Eukaryota
- Kingdom: Animalia
- Phylum: Arthropoda
- Class: Insecta
- Order: Lepidoptera
- Family: Gelechiidae
- Subfamily: Anomologinae
- Genus: Euryctista; Janse, 1963
- Species: E. hobohmi

Binomial name
- Euryctista hobohmi Janse, 1963

Genus of moths

Euryctista is a genus of moths in the family Gelechiidae. It contains the species Euryctista hobohmi, which is found in Namibia and South Africa.
