= Empedaula =

Scientific classification
- Kingdom: Animalia
- Phylum: Arthropoda
- Clade: Pancrustacea
- Class: Insecta
- Order: Lepidoptera
- Family: Gelechiidae
- Genus: Empedaula; Meyrick, 1918

Genus of moths

Empedaula is a genus of moths in the family Gelechiidae, similar to Aristotelia. It is found in South America and Asia and was first described in 1918 by Edward Meyrick in the periodical Exotic Microlepidoptera. The type specimen is Empedaula insipiens.

== Species ==
- Empedaula insipiens Meyrick, 1918
- Empedaula phanerozona Meyrick, 1922
- Empedaula rhodocosma (Meyrick, 1914)
