= Epimimastis =

Scientific classification
- Kingdom: Animalia
- Phylum: Arthropoda
- Class: Insecta
- Order: Lepidoptera
- Family: Gelechiidae
- Subfamily: Gelechiinae
- Genus: Epimimastis; Meyrick, 1904

Genus of moths

Epimimastis is a genus of moths in the family Gelechiidae.

== Species ==
- Epimimastis catopta Turner, 1919
- Epimimastis emblematica Meyrick, 1916
- Epimimastis escharitis Meyrick, 1916
- Epimimastis glaucodes Meyrick, 1910
- Epimimastis porphyroloma (Lower, 1897)
- Epimimastis tegminata Meyrick, 1916
