= Neodactylota =

Scientific classification
- Domain: Eukaryota
- Kingdom: Animalia
- Phylum: Arthropoda
- Class: Insecta
- Order: Lepidoptera
- Family: Gelechiidae
- Tribe: Gelechiini
- Genus: Neodactylota; Busck in Dyar, [1903]

Genus of moths

Neodactylota is a genus of moth in the family Gelechiidae.

== Species ==
- Neodactylota basilica Hodges, 1966
- Neodactylota egena Hodges, 1966
- Neodactylota liguritrix Hodges, 1966
- Neodactylota snellenella (Walsingham, 1888)
