= Nealyda =

Scientific classification
- Domain: Eukaryota
- Kingdom: Animalia
- Phylum: Arthropoda
- Class: Insecta
- Order: Lepidoptera
- Family: Gelechiidae
- Subfamily: Anomologinae
- Genus: Nealyda; Dietz, 1900

Genus of moths

Nealyda is a genus of moths in the family Gelechiidae.

== Species ==
- Nealyda accincta Meyrick, 1923
- Nealyda bicolor (Walsingham, [1892])
- Nealyda bifidella Dietz, 1900
- Nealyda bougainvilleae Hering, 1955
- Nealyda grandipinella Bennett & Hayden, 2024
- Nealyda kinzelella Busck, 1900
- Nealyda leucozostra Meyrick, 1923
- Nealyda neopisoniae Clarke, 1946
- Nealyda panchromatica (Meyrick, 1926)
- Nealyda phytolaccae Clarke, 1946
- Nealyda pisoniae Busck, 1900
