= Vadenia =

Scientific classification
- Domain: Eukaryota
- Kingdom: Animalia
- Phylum: Arthropoda
- Class: Insecta
- Order: Lepidoptera
- Family: Gelechiidae
- Tribe: Anomologini
- Genus: Vadenia; Caradja, 1933
- Species: V. ribbeella

Binomial name
- Vadenia ribbeella (Caradja, 1920)

Synonyms
- Nevadia Caradja, 1920 (preocc. Walcott, 1910); Nevadia ribbeella Caradja, 1920

Genus of moths

Vadenia is a genus of moths in the family Gelechiidae. It contains the species Vadenia ribbeella, which is found in Spain.

The wingspan is 20–23 mm (0.79–0.91 in). The veins of the forewings are white, the area between them dusted with brown scales, least along the fold and the inner margin. The hindwings are light grey.
