= Enchrysa =

Scientific classification
- Kingdom: Animalia
- Phylum: Arthropoda
- Clade: Pancrustacea
- Class: Insecta
- Order: Lepidoptera
- Family: Gelechiidae
- Genus: Enchrysa; Zeller, 1873
- Species: E. dissectella

Binomial name
- Enchrysa dissectella Zeller, 1873

Synonyms
- Aristotelia youngella Kearfott, 1905

Genus of moths

Enchrysa is a genus of moths in the family Gelechiidae. It contains the species Enchrysa dissectella, which is found in North America. It has been recorded from Maine, Minnesota, New Hampshire, Ohio and Ontario.

The wingspan is 10-10.5 mm for males and 12-12.5 mm for females. The basal half of the forewings and outer half along the costa are black or very dark brown, heavily overlaid with iridescent green. The dark basal half is outwardly margined by the black ground colour, owing to the absence of the iridescent scales at this point. All the outer half of wing, except for the dark costal streak, is dull ochreous and is inwardly margined by a pale yellow line where the latter adjoins the dark line of ground colour outlining the basal half. The ochreous and yellow touch the costa only at the middle, and the ochreous shade encloses the dark costal patch. The latter divides the apex and is one half the width of the wing except at its inner end where it is rounded off into the costa. A tiny dark-brown or black dot on ochreous just at end of cell, and below, but not touching the dark patch above it. The division line in middle of wing, dividing dark basal half from ochreous outer half, is slightly oblique. The hindwings are fuscous.
