= Eudactylota iobapta =

Scientific classification
- Kingdom: Animalia
- Phylum: Arthropoda
- Class: Insecta
- Order: Lepidoptera
- Family: Gelechiidae
- Genus: Eudactylota
- Species: E. iobapta

Binomial name
- Eudactylota iobapta (Meyrick, 1927)

Synonyms
- Stomopteryx iobapta Meyrick, 1927; Euchionodes iobapta

Species of moth

Eudactylota iobapta is a moth of the family Gelechiidae. It is found in Mexico and the United States, where it has been recorded from Arizona and Texas.

The wingspan is 9–13 mm. The forewings are mainly shining orange brown, with the costal margin mixed brown and white, the fascia off-white and a buff streak on the costal margin starting at the fascia. The hindwings fuscous, shining orange brown.
