= Naera =

Scientific classification
- Kingdom: Animalia
- Phylum: Arthropoda
- Clade: Pancrustacea
- Class: Insecta
- Order: Lepidoptera
- Family: Gelechiidae
- Genus: Naera; Chambers, 1875
- Species: N. fuscocristatella

Binomial name
- Naera fuscocristatella Chambers, 1875

Synonyms
- Leuce Chambers, 1875; Laverna fuscocristatella Chambers, 1875; Anarsia belfragesella Chambers, 1880

Genus of moths

Naera is a genus of moth in the family Gelechiidae. It contains the species Naera fuscocristatella, which is found in North America, where it has been recorded from Alabama, Kansas, Louisiana, Mississippi, Tennessee and Texas.

The forewings are ash grey, sometimes nearly white, and sometimes suffused with ochreous and brown, and when the thorax and base of the wings are not so suffused, then the white passes gradually into the grey or ochreous brown, deepening gradually to the apex. There are four brown spots, the first placed on the base of the costa, with the others following in a line departing a little from the extreme costa. Opposite the space between the two last of these spots, and beneath the fold, is another small brown spot on the base, near the dorsal margin. There is also one on the apex of the thorax, and sometimes three or four obscure ones on the thorax before it. Beneath the fold, close to, but not touching it, at about half the wing length, is a tuft of raised scales, the anterior portion being brown and the posterior white. Behind the discal cell are two other tufts, opposite to each other, one within the costal margin and the other within the dorsal margin, and behind the space between these tufts are three or four narrow, longitudinal streaks of white and dark grey, and the dorsal margin behind the tuft is whitish. Behind the costal tuft is an oblique white costal streak, passing backwards towards a small whitish spot in the dorsal cilia, and margined decidedly behind by dark brown. Behind the margin of this streak the costal margin along the base of the cilia is reddish ochreous, with three or four small white spots on the base of the cilia, which are greyish brown. There is also a small brown spot on the costa just before the middle, and one on the disc behind it.
