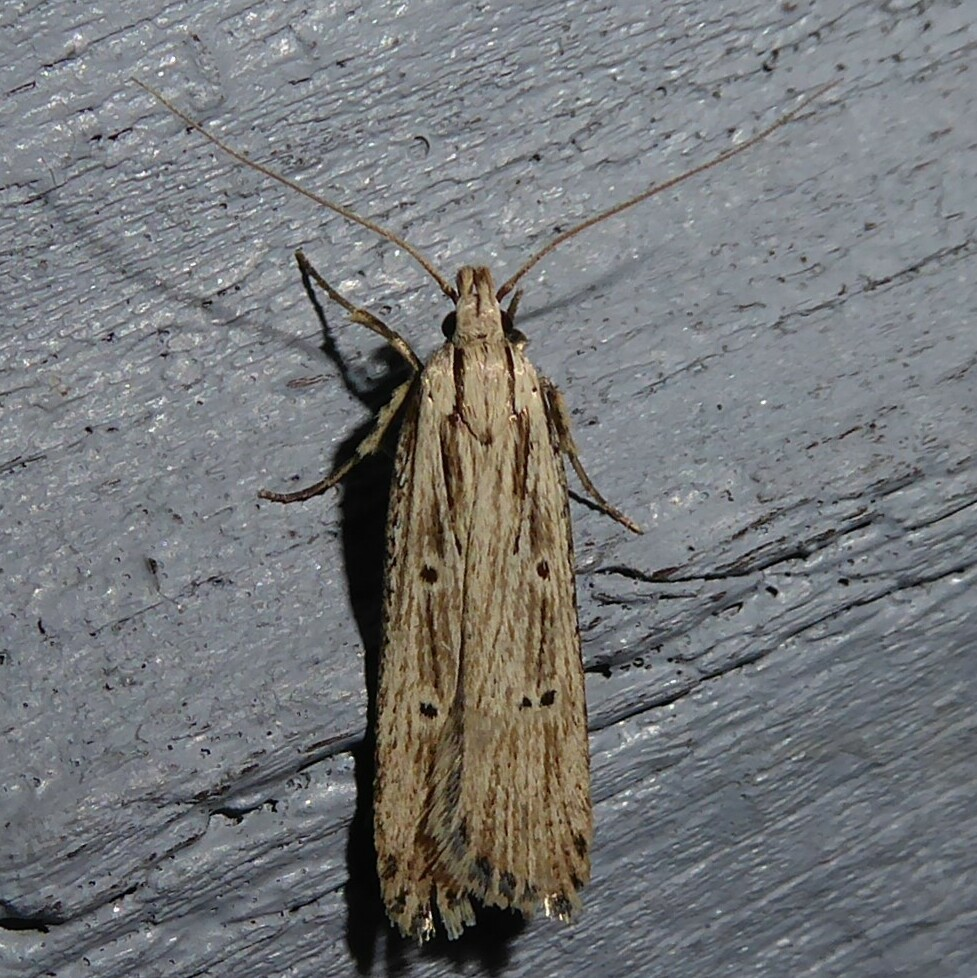

Scientific classification
- Kingdom: Animalia
- Phylum: Arthropoda
- Class: Insecta
- Order: Lepidoptera
- Family: Gelechiidae
- Genus: Anisoplaca
- Species: A. ptyoptera

Binomial name
- Anisoplaca ptyoptera Meyrick, 1885

= Anisoplaca ptyoptera =

Species of moth endemic to New Zealand

Anisoplaca ptyoptera is a species of moth in the family Gelechiidae. It was described by Edward Meyrick in 1885 and is endemic to New Zealand. This species is found throughout the North and South Islands and prefers habitat where its host plants are common. The larval hosts of this moth are species in the genus Carmichaelia and the larvae stem mine the host plant. However larvae have also been observed feeding on gorse species and as a result their potential as a biological control for gorse has been researched. This behaviour has only been recorded in the Canterbury and Otago regions. A. ptyoptera overwinters as larvae and while in that life stage can be parasitised by species of wasp in the genera Zealachertus and Diadegma. Pupation begins in October. Adult moths are on the wing from October until May with peak emergence occurring in January. The adult moths come in two size classes and should the size of the female be in the larger class fecundity is improved. It is likely that this species has only one brood a year.

== Taxonomy ==
This species was first described by Edward Meyrick in November 1885 using a specimen collected in Christchurch by R. W. Fereday and named Anisoplaca ptyoptera. A. ptyoptera is the type species of its genus Anisoplaca. In 1886 Meyrick described this species in greater detail. In 1927 Alfred Philpott studied and illustrated the genitalia of the male holotype. George Hudson discussed and illustrated this species in his book The butterflies and moths of New Zealand. The male holotype is held at the Natural History Museum, London.

== Description ==
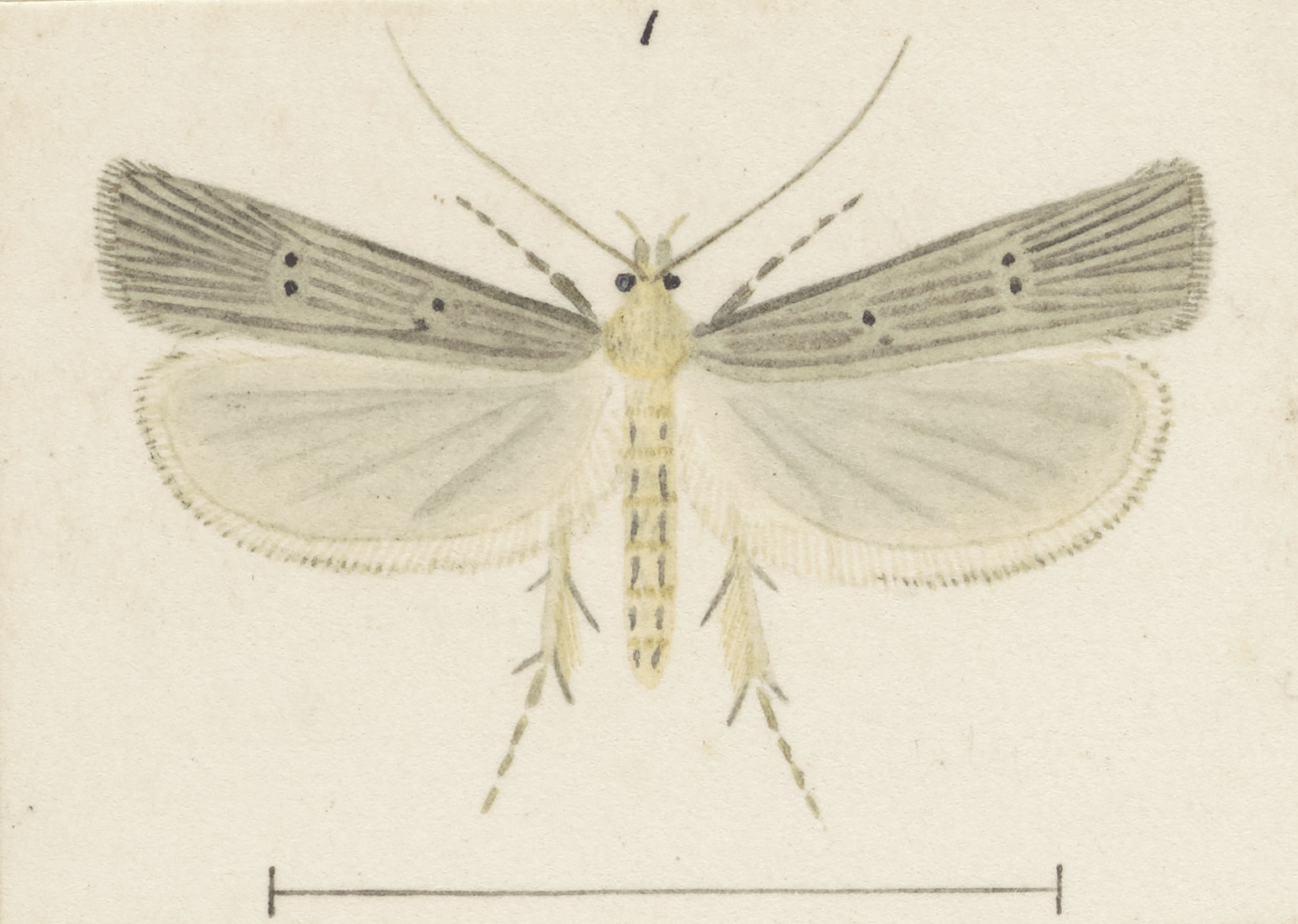
Illustration by George Hudson.

Meyrick described the male adult of the species as follows:

Male. — 27 mm. Head, thorax, and abdomen very pale whitish ochreous, shoulders narrowly dark fuscous. Palpi ochreous-whitish, basal half of second joint and a spot at base of terminal joint fuscous. Antennae fuscous. Legs pale whitish-ochreous, irrorated with dark fuscous. Forewings elongate, narrow, posteriorly somewhat dilated, apex obtuse, hindmargin hardly rounded, oblique; very pale whitish-ochreous, with a few blackish scales, and irregularly irrorated with grey except towards costa and apex, and on two round patches surrounding discal spots; costa irrorated with grey towards base; a black dot beneath costa at 1/4; three small black discal dots, first at 1/3, the other two transversely placed close together beyond middle : cilia ochreous-whitish, with a grey line, basal third suffusedly barred with grey. Hindwings light grey; cilia whitish, with a grey basal fine.

The mature larvae of this species is between 15.5 and 26 mm in length. The body is coloured a creamy yellow and the head is a uniform dark colour. The prothorax is wider and deeper than other thorax segments. Adults of this species appear to come in two size classes and the size of the female impacts fecundity with the larger females producing more eggs that the smaller sized moths.

== Distribution ==
This species is endemic to New Zealand and in older literature is stated as being observed in the Canterbury Region, around Aoraki / Mount Cook and at Waiho Gorge. A more recent source states that the species can be found throughout the North and South Islands but that this species' larval association with gorse is restricted to the Canterbury and Otago regions.

== Behaviour ==
Adults of A. ptyoptera are commonly on the wing from October until May with one period of emergence peaking in January. Larvae occur at all times during the year with pupation beginning in October. It is likely that this moth has only one brood a year.

== Habitat and hosts ==
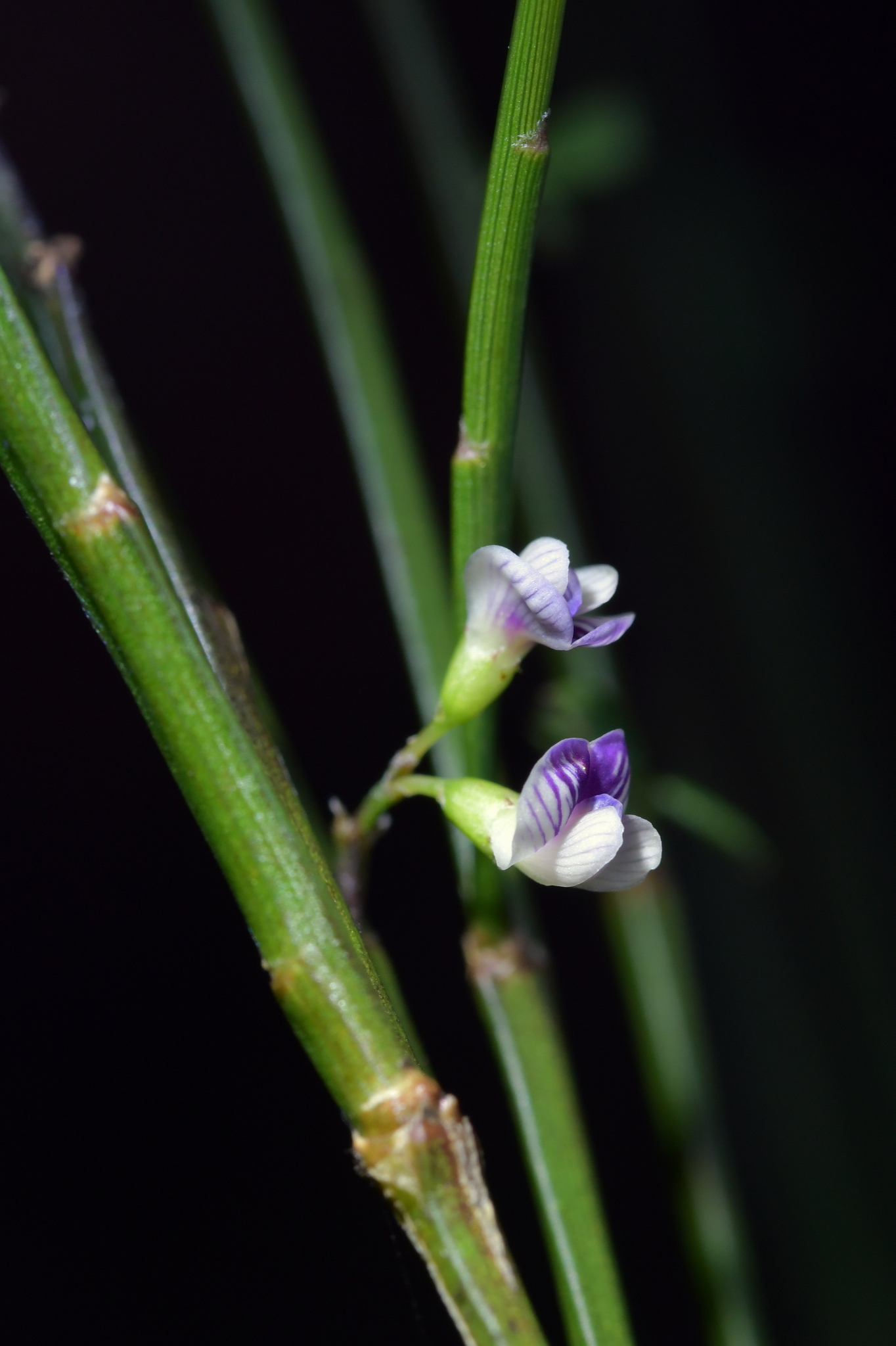
Larval host species Carmichaelia australis.

The larvae of this species are stem miners and are hosted by species within the legume genus Carmichaelia, most of which are endemic to New Zealand. The larvae of this moth is also known as a stem miner of Gorse and has been observed damaging plants upon which it is feeding. The larvae tunnel into the stems of the gorse and then feed under the bark on the phloem and cambium tissues, often ring barking the branch. This causes the branch, and in some cases the plant, to die. The potential for this species to be used as a biological control for gorse has been researched.

== Parasites ==
The larvae of A. ptyoptera suffer parasitisation from native or endemic species of wasp in the genera Zealachertus and Diadegma.
