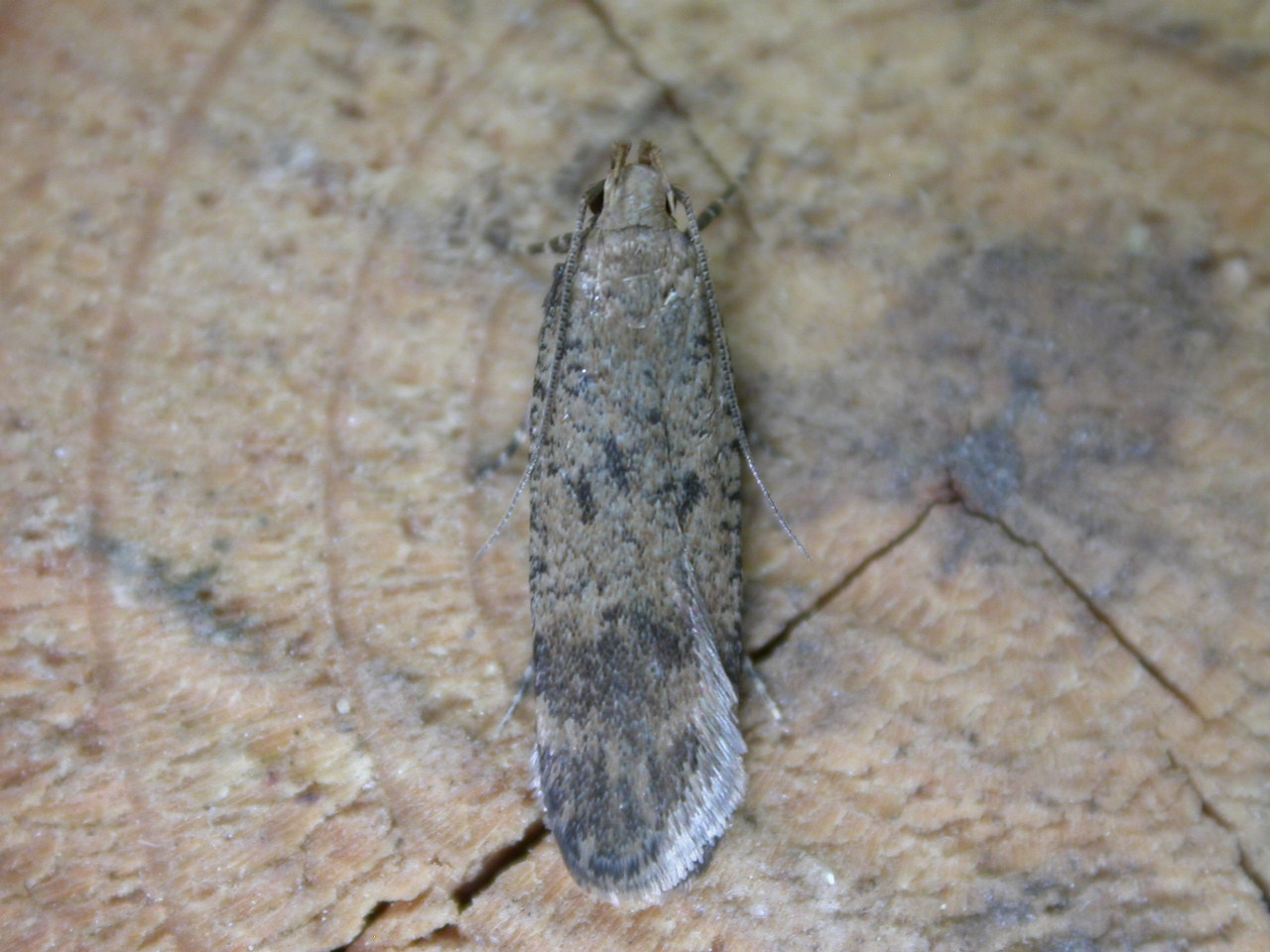

Scientific classification
- Kingdom: Animalia
- Phylum: Arthropoda
- Clade: Pancrustacea
- Class: Insecta
- Order: Lepidoptera
- Family: Gelechiidae
- Subfamily: Apatetrinae
- Genus: Pexicopia; Common, 1958

= Pexicopia =

Genus of moths

Pexicopia is a genus of moths in the family Gelechiidae. It contains 22 species, such as the hollyhock seed moth (Pexicopia malvella), which is found in Europe.

== Species ==
- Pexicopia arenicola Common, 1958
- Pexicopia catharia Common, 1958
- Pexicopia cryphia Common, 1958
- Pexicopia dascia Common, 1958
- Pexicopia desmanthes (Lower, 1898)
- Pexicopia diasema Common, 1958
- Pexicopia dictyomorpha (Lower, 1900)
- Pexicopia epactaea (Meyrick, 1904)
- Pexicopia euryanthes (Meyrick, 1922)
- Pexicopia karachiella Amsel, 1968
- Pexicopia malvella (Hübner, [1805]) (hollyhock seed moth)
- Pexicopia melitolicna (Meyrick, 1935)
- Pexicopia mimetica Common, 1958
- Pexicopia nephelombra (Meyrick, 1904)
- Pexicopia paliscia Common, 1958
- Pexicopia pheletes Common, 1958
- Pexicopia proselia Common, 1958
- Pexicopia pycnoda (Lower, 1899)
- Pexicopia trimetropis (Meyrick, 1922)

== Former species ==
- Pexicopia bathropis
- Pexicopia chalcotora
- Pexicopia lutarea
- Pexicopia plinthodes
