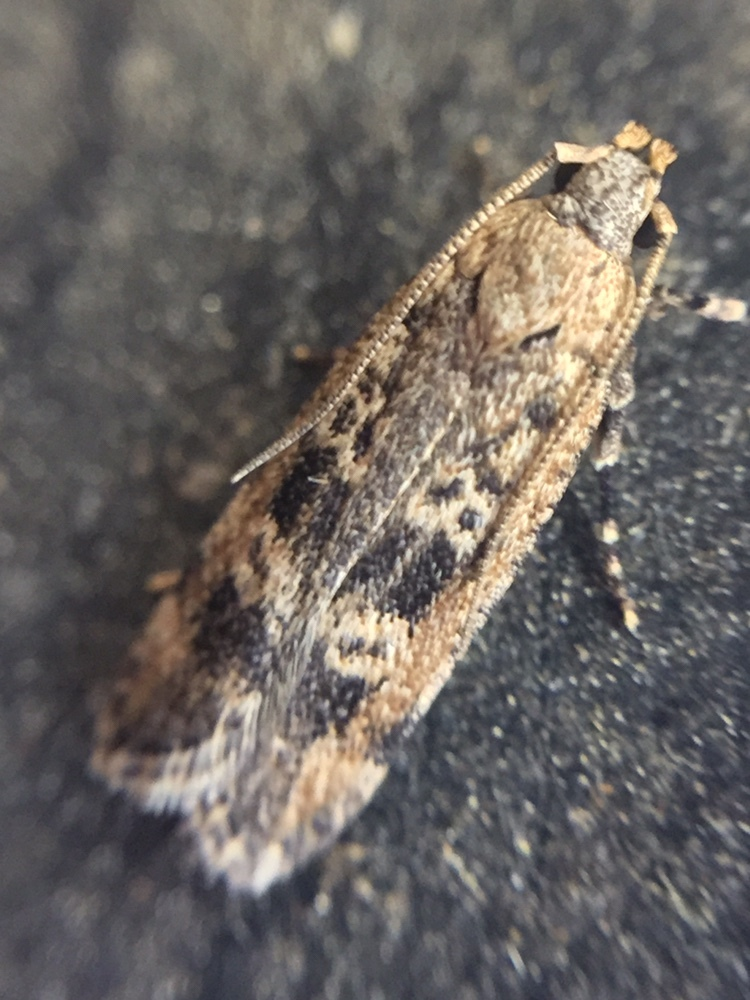

Scientific classification
- Kingdom: Animalia
- Phylum: Arthropoda
- Clade: Pancrustacea
- Class: Insecta
- Order: Lepidoptera
- Family: Gelechiidae
- Genus: Anisoplaca
- Species: A. cosmia

Binomial name
- Anisoplaca cosmia Bradley, 1956

= Anisoplaca cosmia =

Species of moth

Anisoplaca cosmia, also known as the Norfolk Island hibiscus moth, is a species of moth in the family Gelechiidae. It was described by John David Bradley in 1956 and is native to Norfolk Island but has become established in New Zealand.

== Taxonomy ==
This species was first described by John David Bradley in 1956 using a specimen caught while resting on a Norfolk Island pine and named Anisoplaca cosmia. The male holotype specimen is held at the Natural History Museum, London.

== Description ==
The wingspan is about 16 mm. The hindwings are light grey.

This species is similar in appearance to the New Zealand species A. archyrota however can be distinguished as the labial palpus in A. cosmia is coloured fuscous-black to the top of the underside of the second segment where as in A. archyrota the labial palpus is only coloured fuscous-black for the bottom two thirds.

== Distribution ==
This species is native to Norfolk Island but has become established in New Zealand where it has been recorded in Auckland, Hawkes Bay and Gisborne.

== Hosts ==
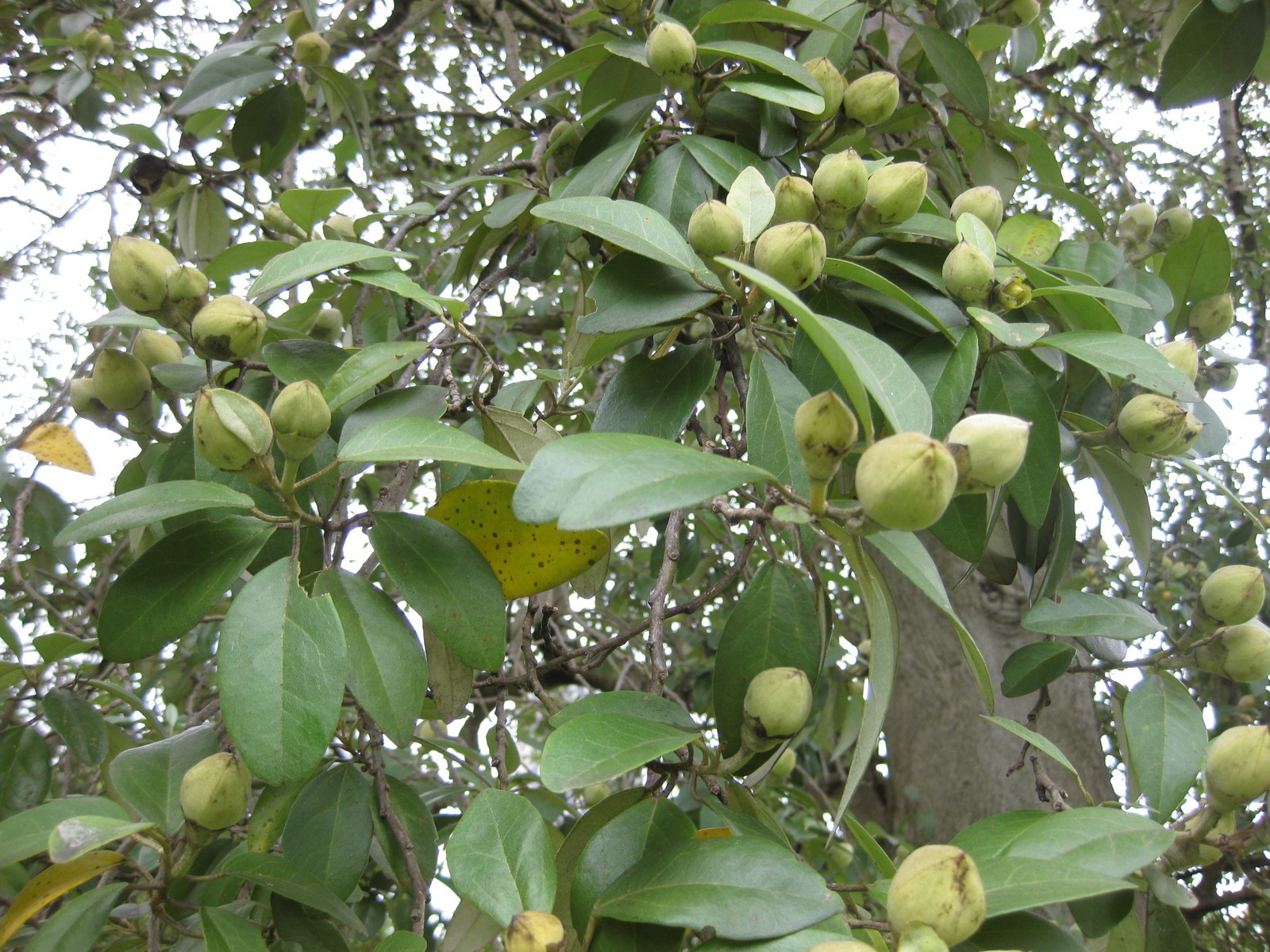
Larval host L. patersonia.

The larvae of this species feed on the fruits and shoots of Lagunaria patersonia.
