= Pexicopia catharia =

Scientific classification
- Domain: Eukaryota
- Kingdom: Animalia
- Phylum: Arthropoda
- Class: Insecta
- Order: Lepidoptera
- Family: Gelechiidae
- Genus: Pexicopia
- Species: P. catharia

Binomial name
- Pexicopia catharia Common, 1958

Species of moth

Pexicopia catharia is a moth of the family Gelechiidae. It was described by Ian Francis Bell Common in 1958. It is found in Australia, where it has been recorded from New South Wales and Queensland.
