= Pexicopia dictyomorpha =

Scientific classification
- Domain: Eukaryota
- Kingdom: Animalia
- Phylum: Arthropoda
- Class: Insecta
- Order: Lepidoptera
- Family: Gelechiidae
- Genus: Pexicopia
- Species: P. dictyomorpha

Binomial name
- Pexicopia dictyomorpha (Lower, 1900)

Synonyms
- Gelechia dictyomorpha Lower, 1900; Gelechia plinthodes Lower, 1920

Species of moth

Pexicopia dictyomorpha is a moth of the family Gelechiidae. It was described by Oswald Bertram Lower in 1900. It is found in Australia, where it has been recorded from New South Wales.

The wingspan is about 16 mm (0.63 in). The forewings are pale ochreous, sprinkled with brownish ochreous and dark fuscous. The costal edge is suffused with rosy and strigulated (lined) with dark fuscous and there is a transverse mark of blackish irroration (sprinkles) from the costa near the base, reaching half across the wing. The stigmata are formed by dark fuscous irroration, the plical obliquely before the first discal, these two approximated and surrounded by a cloud of fuscous irroration. There are traces of a pale angulated transverse shade at three-fourths, enclosed by darker irroration. The hindwings are grey.
