= Pexicopia diasema =

Scientific classification
- Kingdom: Animalia
- Phylum: Arthropoda
- Class: Insecta
- Order: Lepidoptera
- Family: Gelechiidae
- Genus: Pexicopia
- Species: P. diasema

Binomial name
- Pexicopia diasema Common, 1958

Species of moth

Pexicopia diasema is a moth of the family Gelechiidae. It was described by Ian Francis Bell Common in 1958. It is found in Australia, where it has been recorded from Queensland.
