= Pexicopia nephelombra =

Scientific classification
- Kingdom: Animalia
- Phylum: Arthropoda
- Class: Insecta
- Order: Lepidoptera
- Family: Gelechiidae
- Genus: Pexicopia
- Species: P. nephelombra

Binomial name
- Pexicopia nephelombra (Meyrick, 1904)

Synonyms
- Gelechia nephelombra Meyrick, 1904; Gelechia chalcotora Turner, 1919

Species of moth

Pexicopia nephelombra is a moth of the family Gelechiidae. It was described by Edward Meyrick in 1904. It is found in Australia, where it has been recorded from Queensland.

The wingspan is 12–14 mm (0.47–0.55 in). The forewings are light bronzy ochreous sprinkled with fuscous. The markings are cloudy, deep fuscous bronze. There is a basal fascia, and a broader fascia at one-third, connected by a dorsal suffusion. There is also an apical patch covering one-third of the wing. The hindwings are rather dark fuscous.
