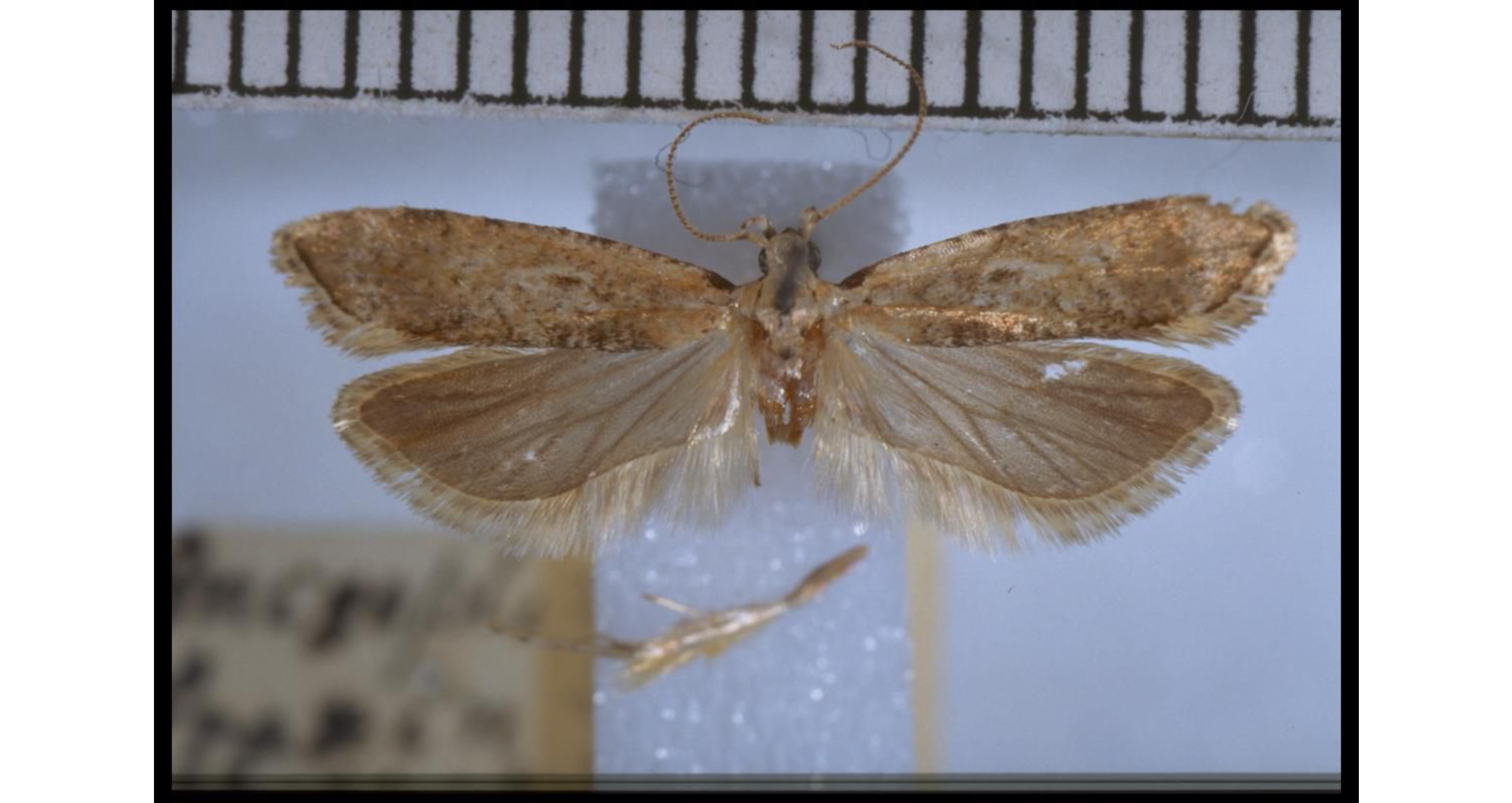

Scientific classification
- Kingdom: Animalia
- Phylum: Arthropoda
- Class: Insecta
- Order: Lepidoptera
- Family: Gelechiidae
- Genus: Anisoplaca
- Species: A. fraxinea

Binomial name
- Anisoplaca fraxinea Philpott, 1928

= Anisoplaca fraxinea =

Species of moth endemic to New Zealand

Anisoplaca fraxinea is a species of moth of the family Gelechiidae. It was described by Alfred Philpott in 1928 and is endemic to New Zealand. It has been observed in the South Island and adults are on the wing in February and March.

== Taxonomy ==
This species was described by Alfred Philpott in 1928 using specimens collected in March at Flora River, in Kahurangi National Park, and in Nelson. The male holotype specimen, collected at Flora River, is held in the New Zealand Arthropod Collection.

== Description ==
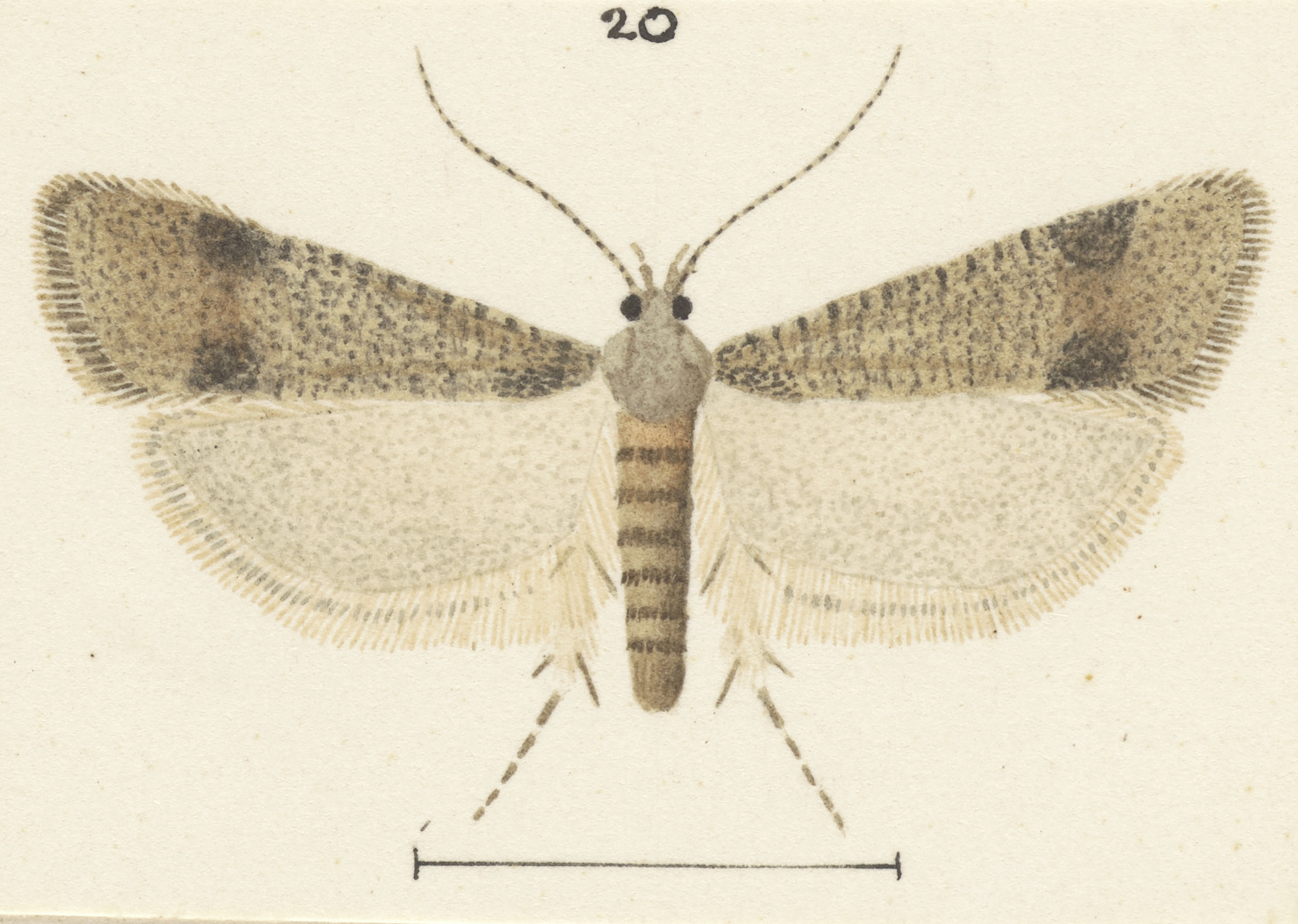

Philpott described this species as follows:

♂ ♀. 19–21 mm. Head and thorax ochreous-white mixed with drab, sides of face black. Palpi ochreous-white, basal ⅔ of second segment black, basal and median fuscous rings on terminal segment. Antennae ochreous-white mixed with fuscous, in male serrulate, ciliations ½. Abdomen whitish-ochreous mixed with fuscous. Legs ochreous, strongly infuscated, tarsi annulated with ochreous. Forewings elongate, costa moderately arched, apex round-pointed, termen rounded, oblique; whitish-ochreous densely irrorated with brownish-ochreous and strigulated with fuscous; costa with black spot at base; costal edge dotted with blackish-fuscous throughout; first discal a blackish dot ringed with whitish; other stigmata obscure or absent; termen margined with blackish-fuscous: fringes ochreous with median fuscous line. Hindwings fuscous-grey: fringes ochreous with obscure dark basal shade.

== Distribution ==
This species is endemic to New Zealand. This species has been collected at its type locality of Flora River, in Nelson, at Arthur's Pass, at Price's Valley Bush at Banks Peninsular and at Aoraki / Mount Cook.

== Behaviour ==
Adults are on the wing in February and March.
