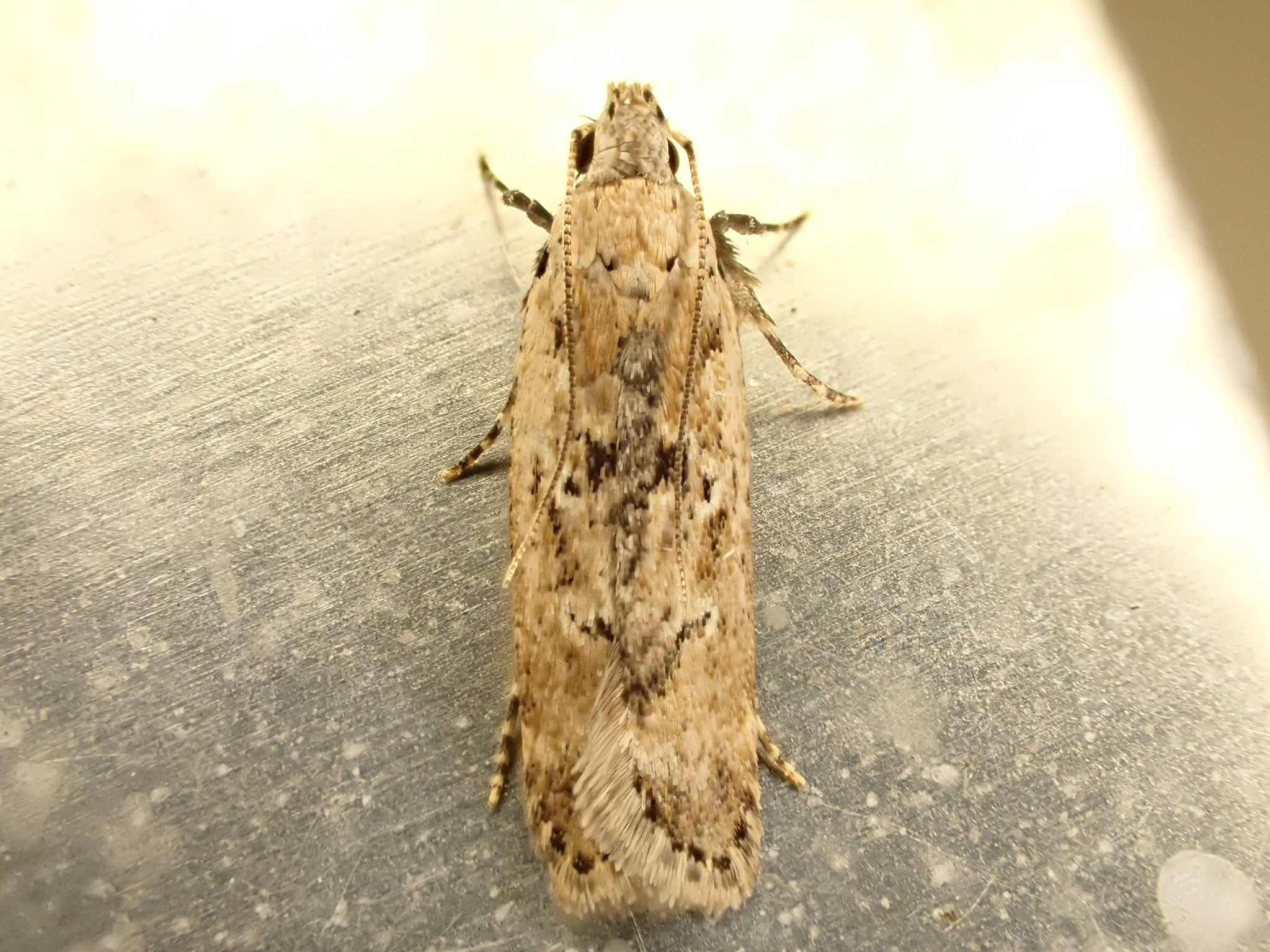

Scientific classification
- Kingdom: Animalia
- Phylum: Arthropoda
- Class: Insecta
- Order: Lepidoptera
- Family: Gelechiidae
- Genus: Anisoplaca
- Species: A. achyrota

Binomial name
- Anisoplaca achyrota (Meyrick, 1885)

Synonyms
- Gelechia achyrota Meyrick, 1885

= Anisoplaca achyrota =

Species of moth endemic to New Zealand

Anisoplaca achyrota is a species of moth in the family Gelechiidae. It was first described by Edward Meyrick in 1885 and is endemic to New Zealand. This species has been observed in both the North and South Islands and inhabits native forest. The larvae of this species feed on the green seeds of Hoheria angustifolia and as such is regarded as an indicator species for mature native forest. The adults of the species are commonly on the wing from December until February and are attracted to light.

== Taxonomy ==
This species was first described by Edward Meyrick in November 1885 and named Gelechia achyota. In 1886 Meyrick described this species in greater detail. In 1915 Meyrick placed this species within the genus Anisoplaca. In 1928 George Hudson described this species under that name however his illustration of that species is, according to John S. Dugdale, of an undescribed species. Dugdale confirmed the placement of this species in the genus Anisoplaca in 1988. The male lectotype specimen, collected at Riccarton Bush, is held at the Natural History Museum, London.

== Description ==
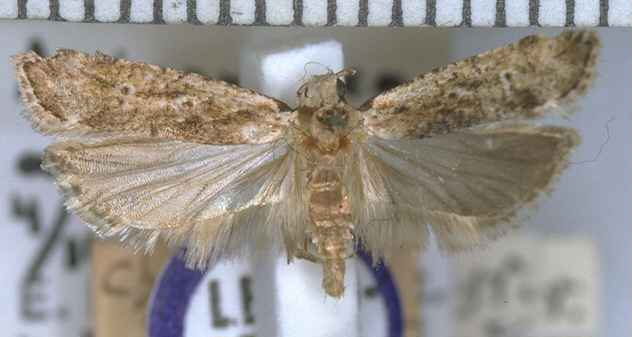
Anisoplaca achyrota male lectotype

The wingspan is 17–18 mm. The forewings are light brownish-ochreous, irregularly mixed with whitish and blackish scales. The anterior half of the costa is suffused with whitish, and dotted with blackish. The inner margin between one-fourth and two-thirds is suffused with blackish and there is a small black spot on the base of the costa, as well as four small black discal spots, surrounded with whitish rings, the first in the disc before the middle, the second on the fold rather before the first, their rings confluent, the third and fourth dot-like, transversely placed and close together in disc at three-fifths. There is a cloudy whitish fascia from four-fifths of the costa to the anal angle, dentate outwards in the middle and a cloudy black hindmarginal line. The hindwings are grey, towards the base paler.

Hudson described this species as rather dull looking. Dugdale pointed out that both Hudson and Philpott confused this species with another undescribed species in their published literature. This species is also very similar in appearance to A. cosmia. However these two species can be distinguished as the labial palpus in A. cosmia are coloured fuscous-black to the top of the underside of the second segment where as in A. archyrota the labial palpus is only coloured fuscous-black for the bottom two thirds.

== Distribution ==
This species is endemic to New Zealand. It can be found in both the North and South Islands including in the Hawkes Bay, West Coast and South Canterbury.

== Behaviour ==
Adults of this species is commonly on the wing from December until February. It is attracted to light and has been collected via light trapping.

== Habitat and hosts ==
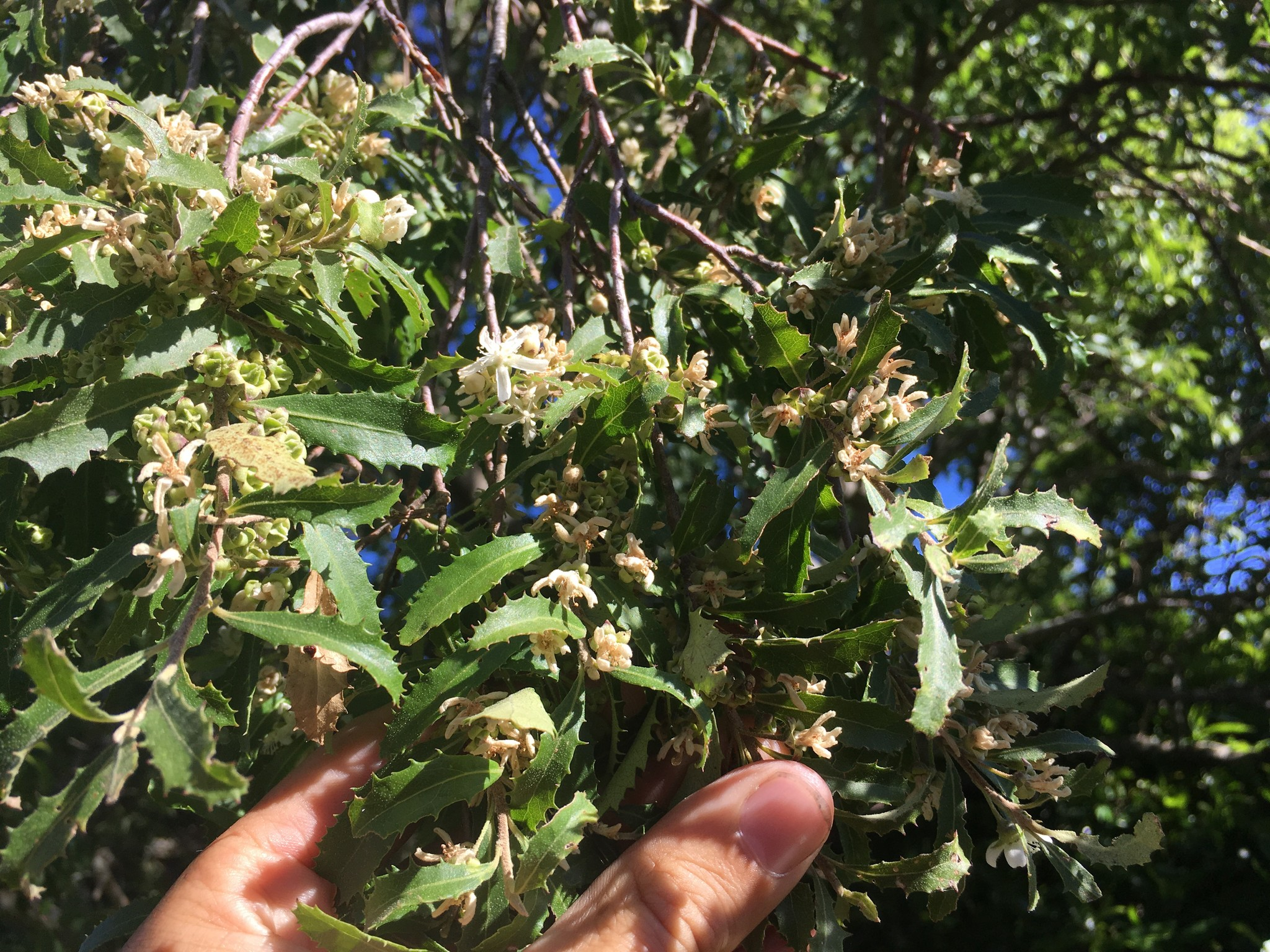
Green seed pods of Hoheria angustifolia.

It inhabits native forests and the larvae of this species feed on the green seeds of Hoheria angustifolia. This species is regarded to be an indicator species of mature native forest as its larvae feed on the seeds of native trees found in at mature sites. Hudson hypothesised that this species was also attached to Hoheria populnea as specimens of this moth had been collected in the vicinity of those trees.
