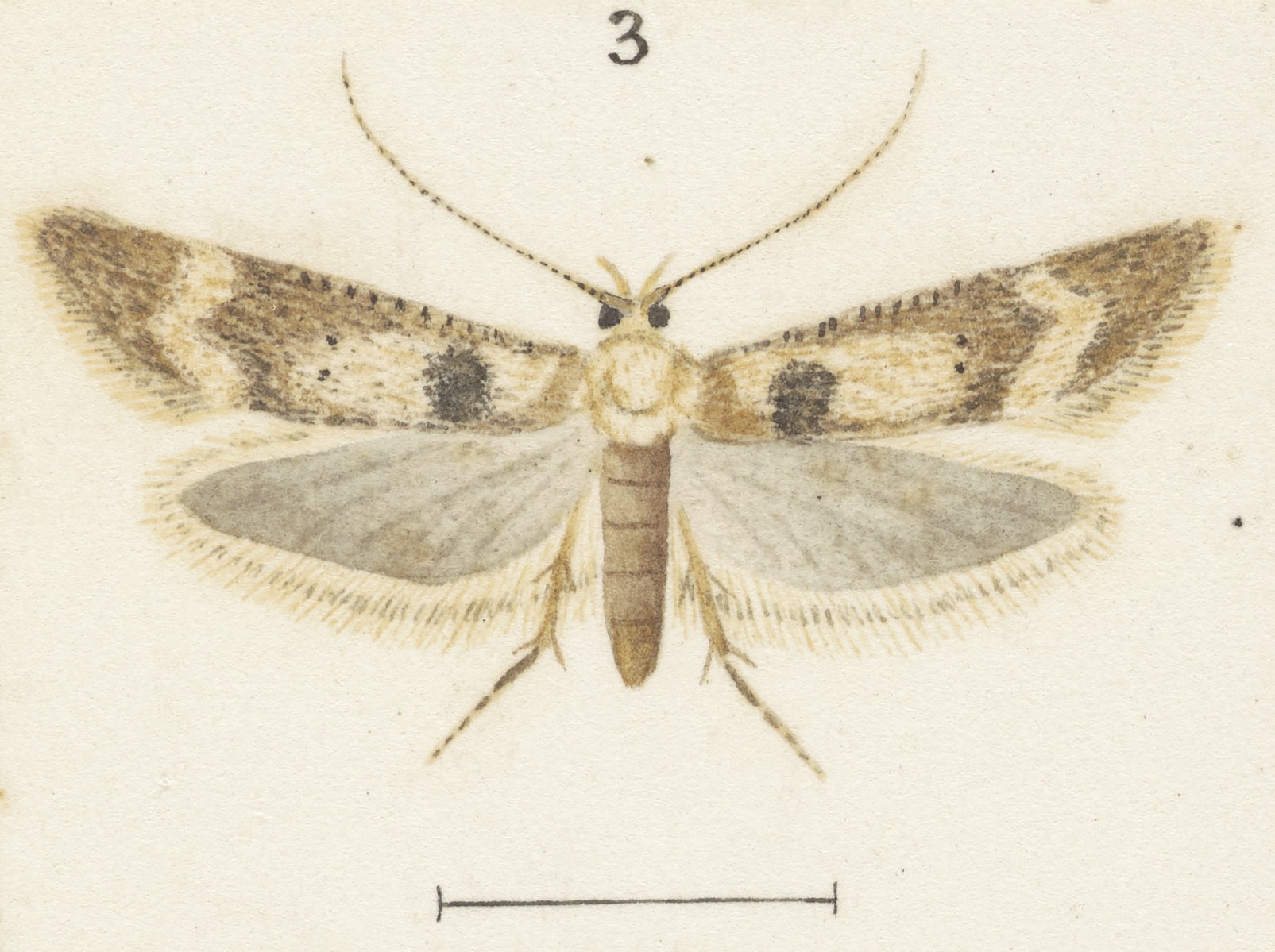

Scientific classification
- Kingdom: Animalia
- Phylum: Arthropoda
- Class: Insecta
- Order: Lepidoptera
- Family: Gelechiidae
- Genus: Anisoplaca
- Species: A. acrodactyla

Binomial name
- Anisoplaca acrodactyla (Meyrick, 1907)

Synonyms
- Gelechia acrodactyla Meyrick, 1907

= Anisoplaca acrodactyla =

Species of moth endemic to New Zealand

Anisoplaca acrodactyla is a species of moth of the family Gelechiidae. It was described by Edward Meyrick in 1907 and is endemic to New Zealand. This species has been observed in South Island as well as in the North Island. Larvae feed on species in the genera Hoheria and Plagianthus including the species Plagianthus regius.

== Taxonomy ==
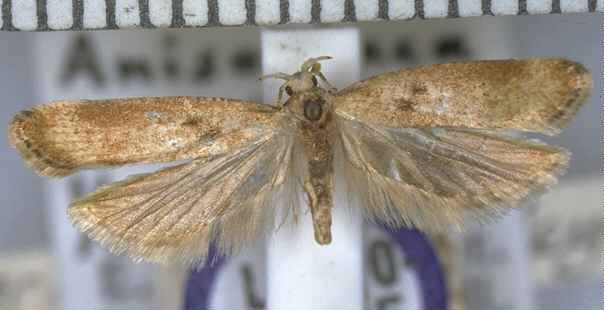
Anisoplaca acrodactyla male lectotype specimen

This species was first described by Edward Meyrick in 1907 and named Gelechia acrodactyla. Meyrick used three specimens collected in native forest in Invercargill by Alfred Philpott. In 1915 Meyrick placed this species within the genus Anisoplaca. In 1928 George Hudson described and illustrated this species. John S. Dugdale confirmed the placement of this species in the genus Anisoplaca in 1988. The male lectotype specimen, collected at Invercargill, is held at the Natural History Museum, London.

== Description ==
Edward Meyrick described this species as follows:

♂. 15–17 mm. Head whitish-ochreous. Palpi ochreous-whitish; basal joint, lower third of second joint, and subapical ring of terminal joint dark fuscous. Antennae serrulate, pubescent, pale ochreous dotted with dark fuscous. Thorax whitish-ochreous, tinged or irrorated with brownish. Abdomen grey. Forewings elongate, narrow, costa gently arched, apex obtuse, termen rounded, rather strongly oblique; whitish-ochreous, irregularly irrorated with brown; plical and first discal stigmata rather large, blackish, plical rather before first discal; brown irroration forms a suffused costal patch beyond middle, and a narrow terminal fascia; cilia whitish-ochreous, with dark-grey subbasal line. Hindwings over 1, grey; cilia, pale whitish-ochreous, with, grey subbasal line.

== Distribution ==
This species is endemic to New Zealand. It is known from the North and South Island and has been observed at its type locality of Invercargill as well as in Dunedin, Wyndham, Banks Peninsular and in the area around the Homer Tunnel.

== Behaviour ==
The adults of this species are on the wing in November and December.

== Host species ==
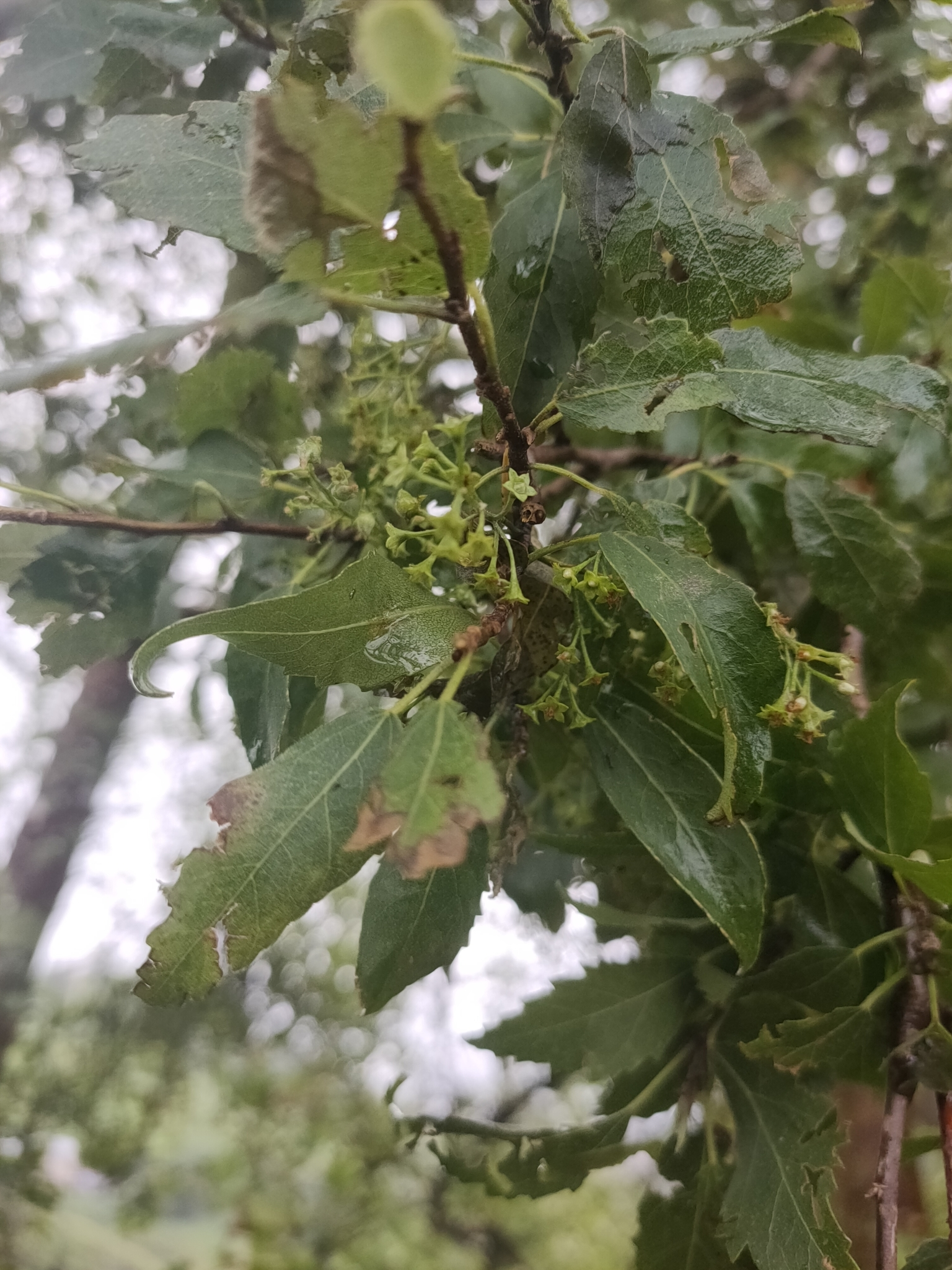
Larval host Plagianthus regius.

The larvae of A. acrodactyla feed on the fruit of Plagianthus regius and adult moths have been reared from larvae feeding on species in the genera of Plagianthus and Hoheria.
