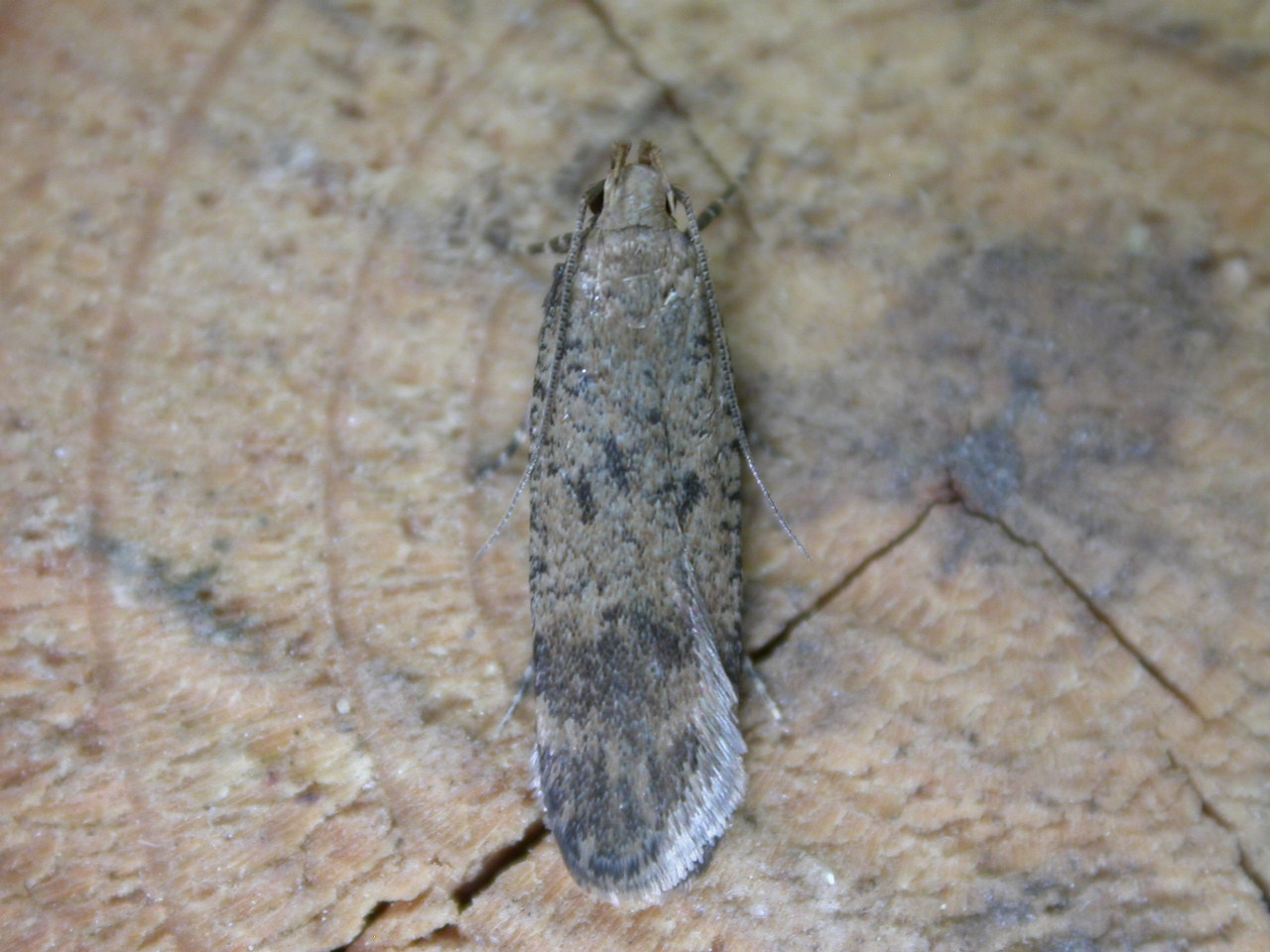

Scientific classification
- Kingdom: Animalia
- Phylum: Arthropoda
- Clade: Pancrustacea
- Class: Insecta
- Order: Lepidoptera
- Family: Gelechiidae
- Genus: Pexicopia
- Species: P. malvella

Binomial name
- Pexicopia malvella (Hübner, [1805])

Synonyms
- Tinea malvella Hübner, [1805]; Recurvaria lutarea Haworth, 1828

= Pexicopia malvella =

Species of moth

Pexicopia malvella, the hollyhock seed moth, is a moth of the family Gelechiidae. It was described by Jacob Hübner in 1805. It is found in almost all of Europe.

The wingspan is 17–20 mm. Adults are on wing from early June to mid-August.

The larvae feed inside the seeds of Malva species, Althaea officinalis and Alcea rosea. The species overwinters in a cocoon constructed within the seed.
