= Pexicopia desmanthes =

Scientific classification
- Domain: Eukaryota
- Kingdom: Animalia
- Phylum: Arthropoda
- Class: Insecta
- Order: Lepidoptera
- Family: Gelechiidae
- Genus: Pexicopia
- Species: P. desmanthes

Binomial name
- Pexicopia desmanthes (Lower, 1898)

Synonyms
- Gelechia desmanthes Lower, 1898

Species of moth

Pexicopia desmanthes is a moth of the family Gelechiidae. It was described by Oswald Bertram Lower in 1898. It is found in Australia, where it has been recorded from Queensland and New South Wales.

The wingspan is 9–13 mm (0.35–0.51 in). The forewings are whitish-ochreous rosy tinged and with four moderate dark bronzy-fuscous fasciae, the first basal, the second before the middle, the third beyond the middle, the fourth apical, connected in the middle with the third by a more or less defined bar. The hindwings are grey.
