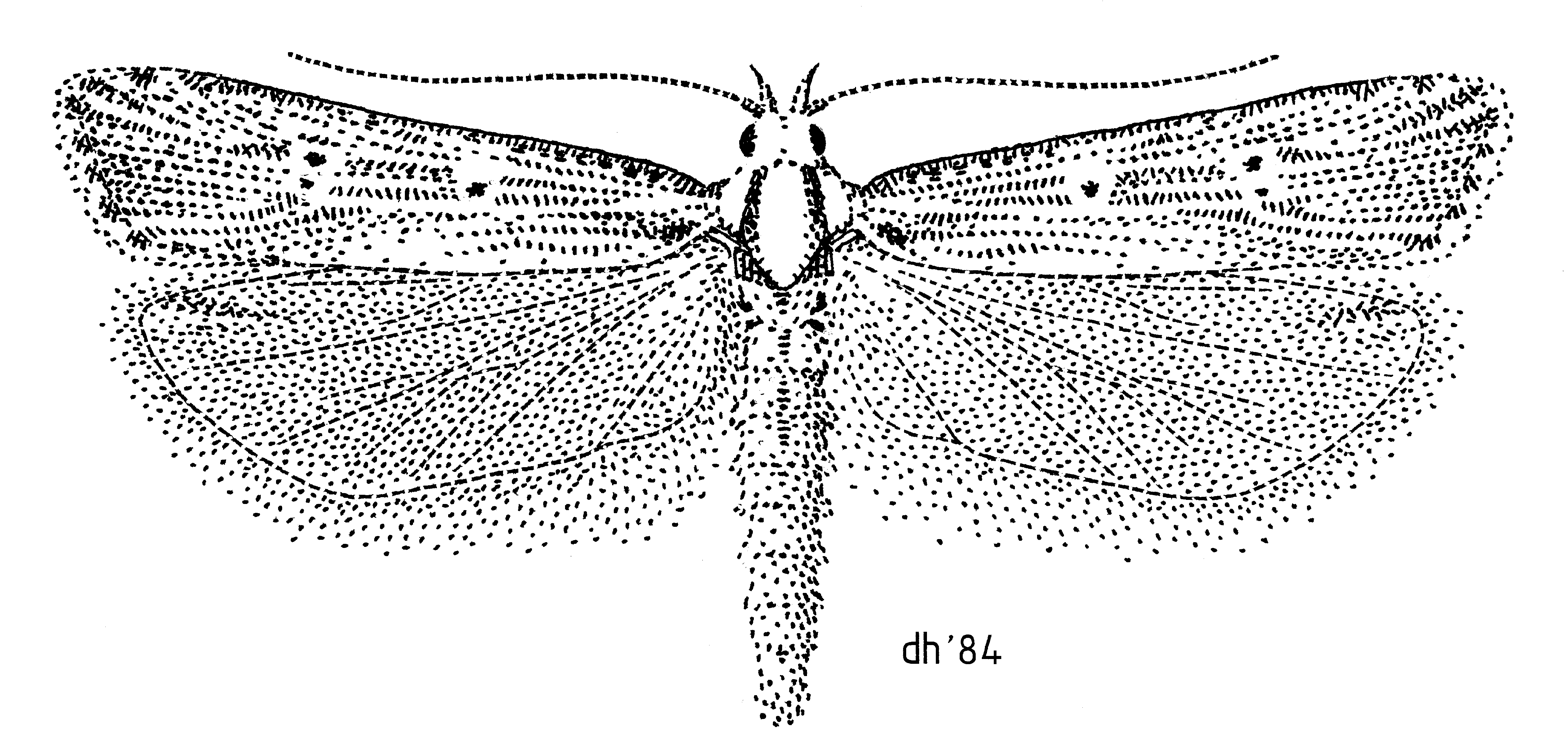
- Anisoplaca ptyoptera illustrated by Des Helmore

Scientific classification
- Domain: Eukaryota
- Kingdom: Animalia
- Phylum: Arthropoda
- Class: Insecta
- Order: Lepidoptera
- Family: Gelechiidae
- Tribe: Pexicopiini
- Genus: Anisoplaca; Meyrick, 1885

= Anisoplaca =

Genus of moths

Anisoplaca is a genus of moth in the family Gelechiidae.

== Species ==
- Anisoplaca achyrota (Meyrick, 1885)
- Anisoplaca acrodactyla (Meyrick, 1907)
- Anisoplaca bathropis (Meyrick, 1904)
- Anisoplaca cosmia Bradley, 1956
- Anisoplaca fraxinea Philpott, 1928
- Anisoplaca ptyoptera Meyrick, 1885
- Anisoplaca viatrix Meyrick, 1921
