= Pexicopia euryanthes =

Scientific classification
- Kingdom: Animalia
- Phylum: Arthropoda
- Clade: Pancrustacea
- Class: Insecta
- Order: Lepidoptera
- Family: Gelechiidae
- Genus: Pexicopia
- Species: P. euryanthes

Binomial name
- Pexicopia euryanthes (Meyrick, 1922)

Synonyms
- Gelechia euryanthes Meyrick, 1922

Species of moth

Pexicopia euryanthes is a moth of the family Gelechiidae. It was described by Edward Meyrick in 1922. It is only found in Australia, where it has been recorded from Western Australia.

The wingspan is about 18 mm. The forewings are dark purplish bronzy fuscous. The markings are whitish ochreous. There are two transversely placed confluent spots in the disc near the base and a broad rather irregular transverse fasciae at one-third and beyond the middle; the posterior edge of the second is indented by a dark spot representing the second discal stigma. A triangular spot is found on the costa at four-fifths and a cloudy dot on the termen opposite. The hindwings are grey, darker towards the apex.

== See also ==
- Gelechiidae
- Moth
- Edward Meyrick
- Lepidoptera
- Western Australia
- List of moths of Australia
