= Pexicopia epactaea =

Scientific classification
- Kingdom: Animalia
- Phylum: Arthropoda
- Class: Insecta
- Order: Lepidoptera
- Family: Gelechiidae
- Genus: Pexicopia
- Species: P. epactaea

Binomial name
- Pexicopia epactaea (Meyrick, 1904)

Synonyms
- Gelechia epactaea Meyrick, 1904

Species of moth

Pexicopia epactaea is a moth of the family Gelechiidae. It was described by Edward Meyrick in 1904. It is found in Australia, where it has been recorded from South Australia.

The wingspan is about 17 mm (0.67 in). The forewings are pale brownish ochreous, irregularly irrorated (sprinkled) with and partially suffused with dark fuscous, especially towards the dorsum and posteriorly. There is a spot of whitish-ochreous suffusion beneath the costa near the base. The stigmata are dark fuscous, very obscure, the plical beneath the first discal, the second discal more distinct, partially surrounded with whitish-ochreous suffusion. The hindwings are fuscous, paler anteriorly.
