= Pexicopia karachiella =

Scientific classification
- Domain: Eukaryota
- Kingdom: Animalia
- Phylum: Arthropoda
- Class: Insecta
- Order: Lepidoptera
- Family: Gelechiidae
- Genus: Pexicopia
- Species: P. karachiella

Binomial name
- Pexicopia karachiella Amsel, 1968

Species of moth

Pexicopia karachiella is a moth of the family Gelechiidae. It was described by Hans Georg Amsel in 1968 and is found in western Pakistan.
