= Anisoplaca viatrix =

Scientific classification
- Kingdom: Animalia
- Phylum: Arthropoda
- Class: Insecta
- Order: Lepidoptera
- Family: Gelechiidae
- Genus: Anisoplaca
- Species: A. viatrix

Binomial name
- Anisoplaca viatrix Meyrick, 1921

Species of moth

Anisoplaca viatrix is a species of moth in the family Gelechiidae. It was described by Edward Meyrick in 1921. It is found on Java.

The wingspan is about 18 mm. The forewings are pale greyish-ochreous, with small faint scattered grey strigulae. The costal edge is irrorated (speckled) with blackish from the base to near the middle and there are black subcostal and subdorsal dots near the base. The first discal stigma is small, black, in the middle of the disc, others are absent, but there is an irregular black mark on the apical edge. The hindwings are light grey.
