= Pexicopia melitolicna =

Scientific classification
- Kingdom: Animalia
- Phylum: Arthropoda
- Class: Insecta
- Order: Lepidoptera
- Family: Gelechiidae
- Genus: Pexicopia
- Species: P. melitolicna

Binomial name
- Pexicopia melitolicna (Meyrick, 1935)

Synonyms
- Gelechia melitolicna Meyrick, 1935

Species of moth

Pexicopia melitolicna is a moth of the family Gelechiidae. It was described by Edward Meyrick in 1935. It is found in Korea and China (Shandong, Anhui, Jiangsu, Jiangxi).
