= Pexicopia pycnoda =

Scientific classification
- Kingdom: Animalia
- Phylum: Arthropoda
- Class: Insecta
- Order: Lepidoptera
- Family: Gelechiidae
- Genus: Pexicopia
- Species: P. pycnoda

Binomial name
- Pexicopia pycnoda (Lower, 1899)

Synonyms
- Gelechia pycnoda Lower, 1899

Species of moth

Pexicopia pycnoda is a moth of the family Gelechiidae. It was described by Oswald Bertram Lower in 1899. It is found in Australia, where it has been recorded from New South Wales.

The wingspan is about 15 mm (0.59 in). The forewings are light greyish ochreous, bronzy tinged, irrorated (sprinkled) with fuscous and dark fuscous. This irroration appears to indicate faint darker fasciae at the base, one-third, two-thirds, and the apex. The discal stigmata are obscurely indicated. The hindwings are whitish grey.
