= Pexicopia trimetropis =

Scientific classification
- Kingdom: Animalia
- Phylum: Arthropoda
- Class: Insecta
- Order: Lepidoptera
- Family: Gelechiidae
- Genus: Pexicopia
- Species: P. trimetropis

Binomial name
- Pexicopia trimetropis (Meyrick, 1922)

Synonyms
- Protolechia trimetropis Meyrick, 1904

Species of moth

Pexicopia trimetropis is a moth of the family Gelechiidae. It was described by Edward Meyrick in 1922. It is found in Australia, where it has been recorded from Western Australia.

The wingspan is about 14 mm. The forewings are whitish ochreous with a pink tinge, irregularly sprinkled with brown and dark fuscous. There are three semi-oval dark fuscous spots on the costa between one-third and three-fourths, and three smaller more suffused spots posteriorly. The stigmata are very small, formed of dark fuscous irroration (sprinkles), the plical nearly beneath the first discal, an additional dot beneath the second discal. There is some irregular fuscous irroration towards the costa posteriorly. The termen obscurely spotted with dark fuscous irroration. The hindwings are pale grey.
