= Anisoplaca bathropis =

Scientific classification
- Kingdom: Animalia
- Phylum: Arthropoda
- Class: Insecta
- Order: Lepidoptera
- Family: Gelechiidae
- Genus: Anisoplaca
- Species: A. bathropis

Binomial name
- Anisoplaca bathropis (Meyrick, 1904)

Synonyms
- Gelechia bathropis Meyrick, 1904; Pexicopia bathropis

Species of moth

Anisoplaca bathropis is a species of moth in the family Gelechiidae. It was described by Edward Meyrick in 1904. It is found in Australia, where it has been recorded from New South Wales and South Australia.

The wingspan is about 16 mm (0.63 in). The forewings are whitish-fuscous, faintly rosy-tinged, sprinkled with fuscous and dark fuscous and with a black dot beneath or touching the costa near the base. There is an irregular black dot above the dorsum near the base. The stigmata are indistinct, dark fuscous, the plical obliquely before the first discal. The hindwings are pale whitish-grey, darker terminally.
