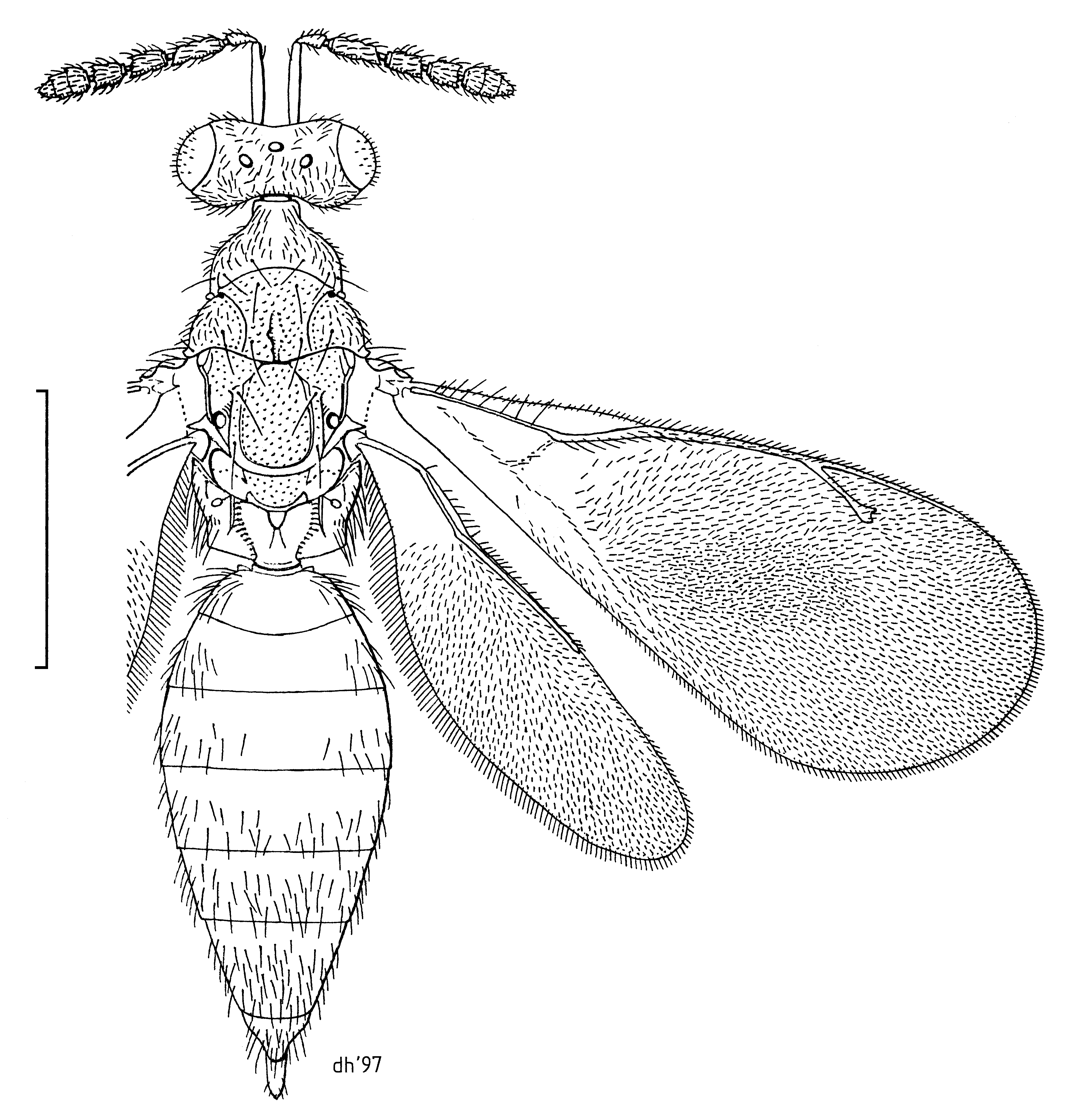

Scientific classification
- Kingdom: Animalia
- Phylum: Arthropoda
- Class: Insecta
- Order: Hymenoptera
- Family: Eulophidae
- Subfamily: Eulophinae
- Genus: Zealachertus; Boucek, 1978

Type species
- Zealachertus nothofagi Boucek, 1978

Species
- Zealachertus abbreviatus Berry, 1999; Zealachertus aspirensis Berry, 1999; Zealachertus bildiri Berry, 1999; Zealachertus binarius Berry, 1999; Zealachertus conjunctus Berry, 1999; Zealachertus holderi Berry, 1999; Zealachertus longus Berry, 1999; Zealachertus nephelion Berry, 1999; Zealachertus nothofagi Boucek, 1978; Zealachertus pilifer Berry, 1999; Zealachertus planus Berry, 1999; Zealachertus tortriciphaga Berry, 1999

= Zealachertus =

Genus of wasps

Zealachertus is a genus of hymenopteran insects of the family Eulophidae.
