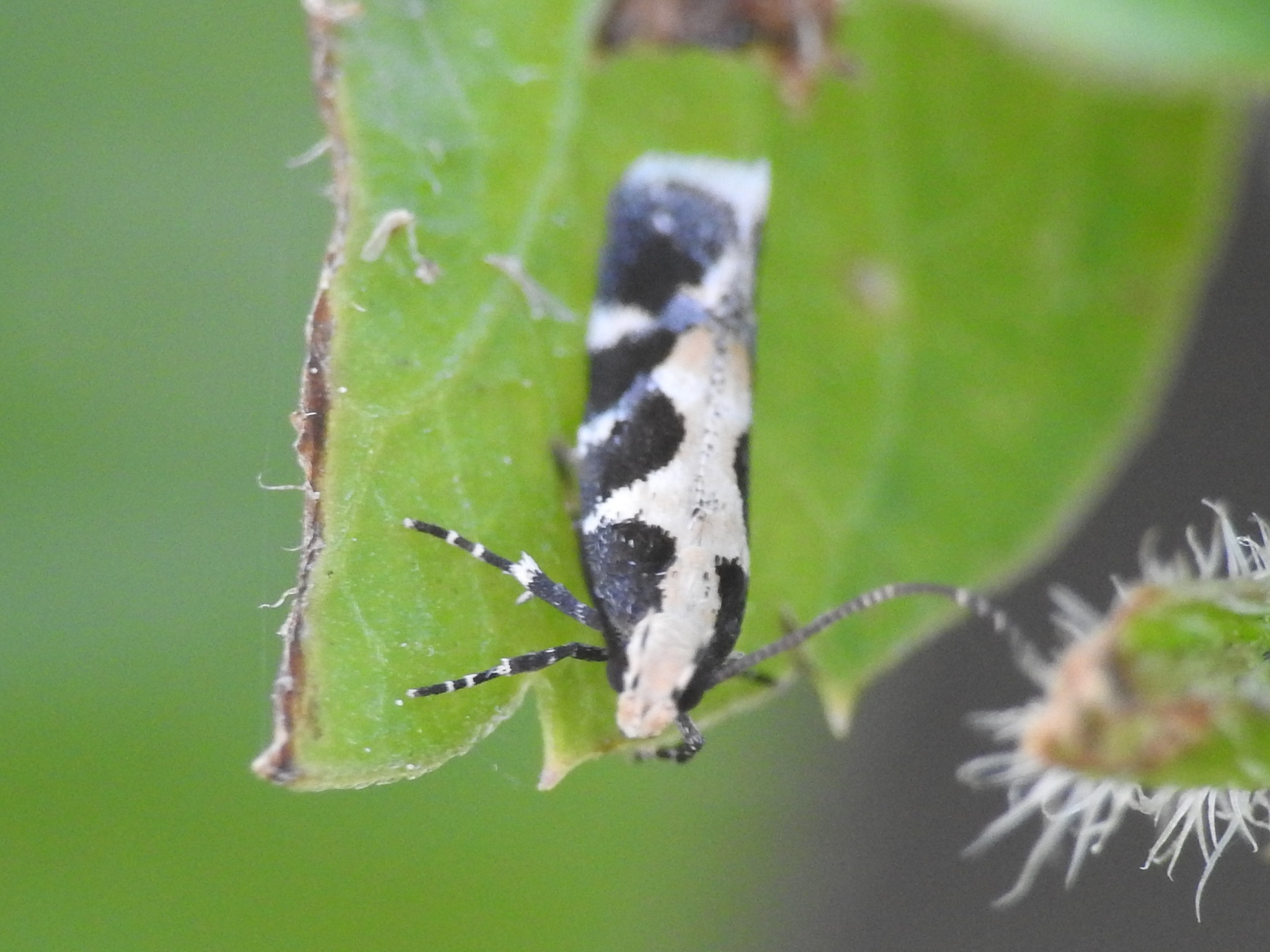
- adult seen in Florida, USA

Scientific classification
- Domain: Eukaryota
- Kingdom: Animalia
- Phylum: Arthropoda
- Class: Insecta
- Order: Lepidoptera
- Family: Gelechiidae
- Genus: Stegasta
- Species: S. capitella

Binomial name
- Stegasta capitella (Fabricius, 1794)

Synonyms
- Alucita capitella Fabricius, 1794; Ypsolophus capitatus Fabricius, 1798; Gelechia robustella Walker, 1864; Gelechia rivulella Möschler, 1890

= Stegasta capitella =

Species of moth

Stegasta capitella, the teaweed moth, is a moth of the family Gelechiidae. It was described by Johan Christian Fabricius in 1794. It is found in West Indies and the south-eastern United States, where it has been recorded from Florida, Georgia and Texas.

The length of the forewings is about 4 mm. Adults are on wing from February to August and in October and December in Florida.

The larvae feed on peanut and Sida spinosa.
