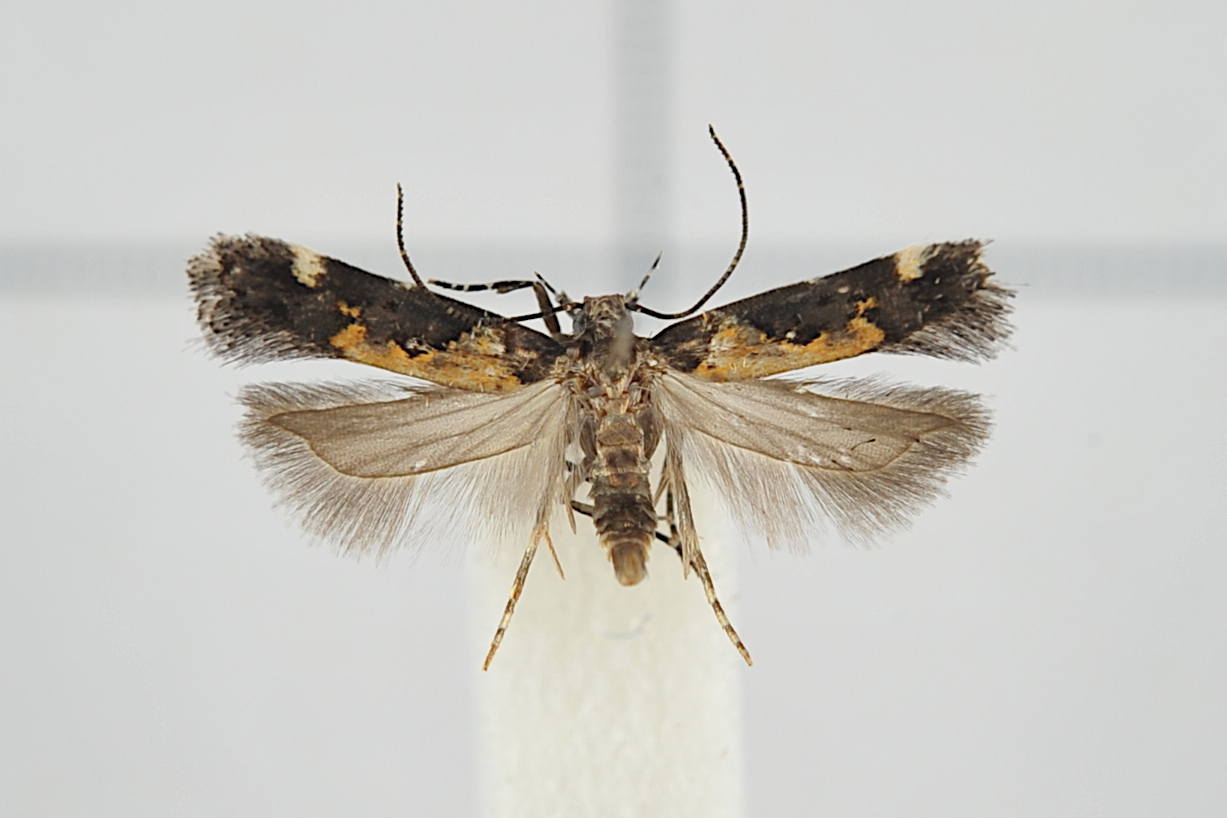

Scientific classification
- Kingdom: Animalia
- Phylum: Arthropoda
- Class: Insecta
- Order: Lepidoptera
- Family: Gelechiidae
- Genus: Stegasta
- Species: S. jejuensis

Binomial name
- Stegasta jejuensis Park & M. Omelko, 1994

= Stegasta jejuensis =

Species of moth

Stegasta jejuensis is a moth of the family Gelechiidae. It was described by Kyu-Tek Park and Mikhail Mikhailovich Omelko in 1994. It is found in the Russian Far East, Korea, Japan, and Taiwan.
