= Stegasta abdita =

Scientific classification
- Kingdom: Animalia
- Phylum: Arthropoda
- Class: Insecta
- Order: Lepidoptera
- Family: Gelechiidae
- Genus: Stegasta
- Species: S. abdita

Binomial name
- Stegasta abdita Park & M. Omelko, 1994

Species of moth

Stegasta abdita is a moth of the family Gelechiidae. It was described by Kyu-Tek Park and Mikhail Mikhailovich Omelko in 1994. It is found in Primorsky Krai in the Russian Far East and Japan.
