= Stegasta allactis =

Scientific classification
- Kingdom: Animalia
- Phylum: Arthropoda
- Class: Insecta
- Order: Lepidoptera
- Family: Gelechiidae
- Genus: Stegasta
- Species: S. allactis

Binomial name
- Stegasta allactis Meyrick, 1904

Species of moth

Stegasta allactis is a moth of the family Gelechiidae. It was described by Edward Meyrick in 1904. It is found in Australia, where it has been recorded from South Australia and Western Australia.

The wingspan is 13–14 mm (0.51–0.55 in). The forewings are rather dark ferruginous fuscous, towards the dorsum between one-fourth and the tornus ferruginous ochreous sprinkled with dark fuscous. There are three ochreous-white fasciae, becoming silvery metallic on the lower half, the first from the costa at one-fourth, outwardly oblique, the second median, vertical, including a dark fuscous dot above the middle, the third from three-fourths of the costa, inwardly oblique, interrupted in the middle. The hindwings are light grey.
