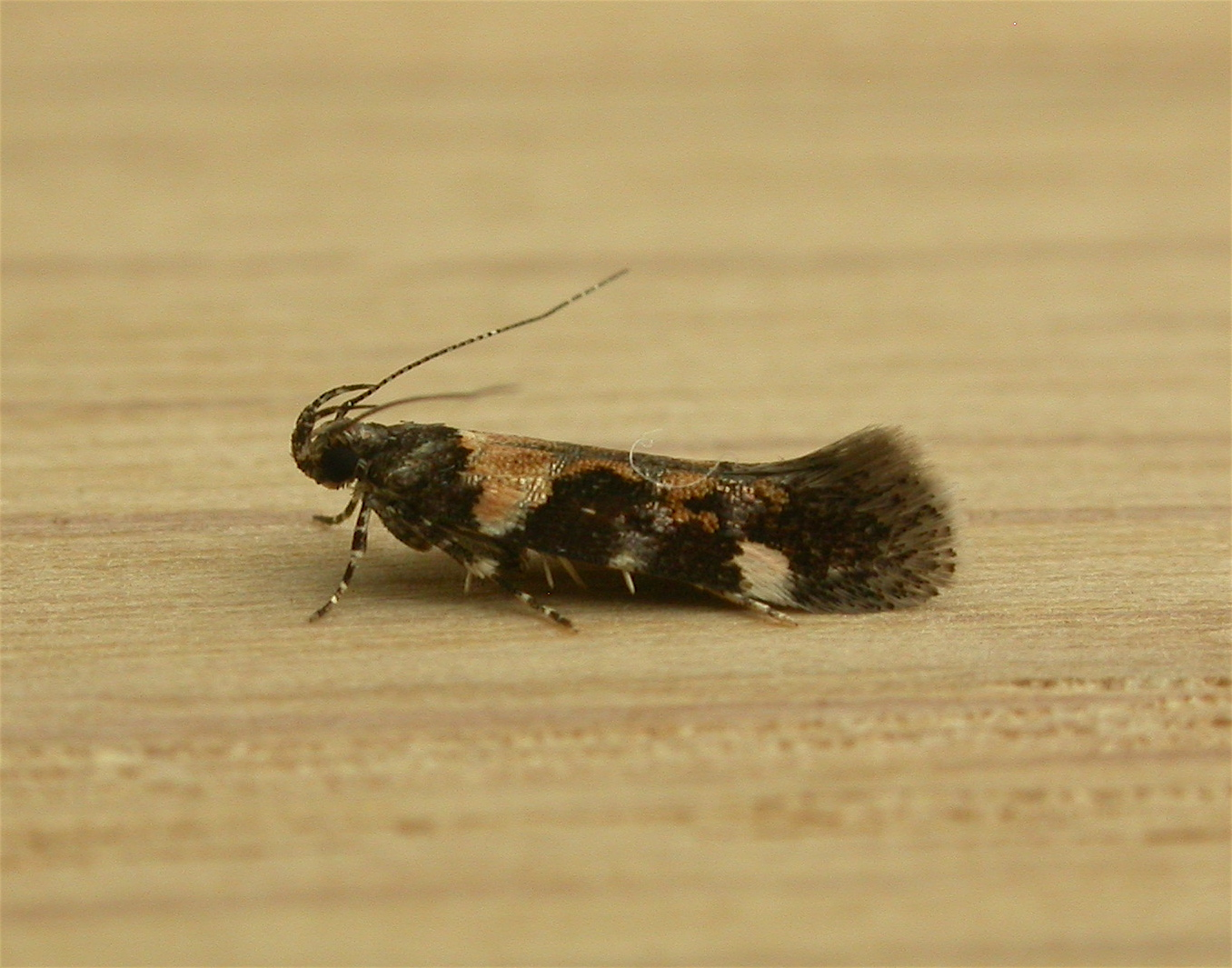

Scientific classification
- Kingdom: Animalia
- Phylum: Arthropoda
- Class: Insecta
- Order: Lepidoptera
- Family: Gelechiidae
- Genus: Stegasta
- Species: S. variana

Binomial name
- Stegasta variana Meyrick, 1904

= Stegasta variana =

Species of moth

Stegasta variana is a species of moth of the family Gelechiidae. It is found in Queensland, China, India, Malaysia, Réunion and Africa.

== Taxonomy ==
The wingspan is about 10–12 mm (0.39–0.47 in). The forewings are dark coppery-fuscous with a ferruginous-orange fascia at one-fourth, extended as a thick irregular streak along the dorsum to near the tornus. There are four irregular pale golden-metallic fasciae, with the costal extremities white, the first two margining the orange fascia, the third median, enclosing a dot of ground colour above the middle, the fourth at three-fourths, terminating above in a large quadrate ochreous-white spot. The hindwings are grey.

== Foodplants ==
This species feeds on Caesalpiniaceae, Fabaceae and Oleaceae species.
