= Stegasta tenebricosa =

Scientific classification
- Domain: Eukaryota
- Kingdom: Animalia
- Phylum: Arthropoda
- Class: Insecta
- Order: Lepidoptera
- Family: Gelechiidae
- Genus: Stegasta
- Species: S. tenebricosa

Binomial name
- Stegasta tenebricosa Turner, 1919

Species of moth

Stegasta tenebricosa is a moth of the family Gelechiidae. It was described by Turner in 1919. It is found in Australia, where it has been recorded from southern Queensland.

The wingspan is about 20 mm. The forewings are blackish sparsely irrorated with whitish and without defined markings. The hindwings are pale-grey and nearly twice as broad as the forewings.
