= Stegasta postpallescens =

Scientific classification
- Domain: Eukaryota
- Kingdom: Animalia
- Phylum: Arthropoda
- Class: Insecta
- Order: Lepidoptera
- Family: Gelechiidae
- Genus: Stegasta
- Species: S. postpallescens

Binomial name
- Stegasta postpallescens (Walsingham, 1897)

Synonyms
- Gelechia postpallescens Walsingham, 1897

Species of moth

Stegasta postpallescens is a moth of the family Gelechiidae described by Walsingham in 1897. It is found in the West Indies, where it has been recorded from Grenada and Cuba.

The wingspan is about 9 mm. The forewings are brownish fuscous, sparsely sprinkled with ochreous scales. A creamy-ochreous dorsal streak occupies one-third the width of the wing and runs from the base through the tornal cilia. A small creamy-ochreous costal spot lies at one-fourth from the apex, and a few pale ochreous scales are visible at the base of the brownish-fuscous terminal cilia. The hindwings are grey.
