= Stegasta cosmodes =

Scientific classification
- Kingdom: Animalia
- Phylum: Arthropoda
- Class: Insecta
- Order: Lepidoptera
- Family: Gelechiidae
- Genus: Stegasta
- Species: S. cosmodes

Binomial name
- Stegasta cosmodes (Lower, 1899)

Synonyms
- Gelechia cosmodes Lower, 1899

Species of moth

Stegasta cosmodes is a moth of the family Gelechiidae. It was described by Oswald Bertram Lower in 1899. It is found in Australia, where it has been recorded from New South Wales.

The wingspan is 8–16 mm. The forewings are reddish ferruginous, with black-and-golden-metallic markings and a small black basal patch, the outer edge moderately straight, indented in the middle, where there are a few golden-metallic scales. There is a narrow outwardly oblique golden-metallic fascia, from the costa at one-fourth to beyond the inner margin at one-third, sometimes hardly reaching the inner margin. An irregular black quadrate spot is found on the costa immediately beyond, reaching more than halfway across the wing and there is a second, similar to first, golden-metallic fascia, not so oblique as the first, immediately beyond the quadrate spot, sometimes broken, from the middle of the costa to the middle of the inner margin. A small roundish ochreous-white spot is found on the costa at three-fourths, the lower half reddish tinged, reaching nearly halfway across the wing and a golden-metallic patch of scales is found beneath, but slightly anterior. There is also a blackish elongate spot on the costa between the second fascia and a whitish spot and the hindmarginal area beyond is black. The hindwings are pale fuscous.
