= Stegasta biniveipunctata =

Scientific classification
- Domain: Eukaryota
- Kingdom: Animalia
- Phylum: Arthropoda
- Class: Insecta
- Order: Lepidoptera
- Family: Gelechiidae
- Genus: Stegasta
- Species: S. biniveipunctata

Binomial name
- Stegasta biniveipunctata (Walsingham, 1897)

Synonyms
- Gelechia biniveipunctata Walsingham, 1897

Species of moth

Stegasta biniveipunctata is a moth of the family Gelechiidae. It was described by Walsingham in 1897. It is found in the West Indies (Grenada).

The wingspan is about 8 mm for males and 10 mm for females. The forewings are tawny brown, with two white costal spots, the first small at half the wing length, the second larger at the commencement of the costal cilia. An ochreous band beginning at the base follows the dorsum to the end of the fold, where it terminates in a slight rounded projection above the fold. Its upper edge is indented about the middle by a dark tawny-brown spot, blending with the ground-colour above it. There are three shining steel-grey bands. The hindwings are steel-grey.
