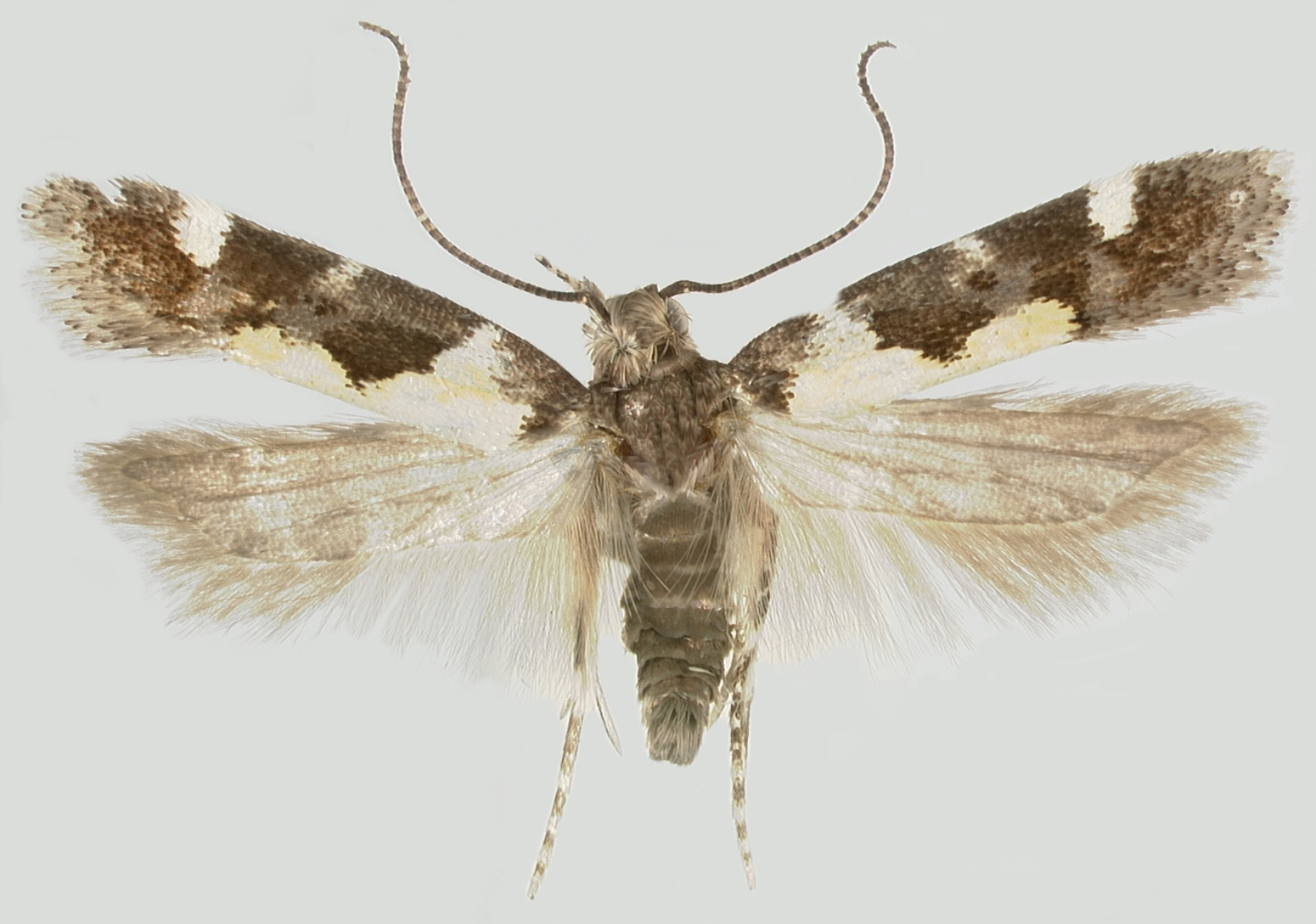
- Stegasta bosqueella

Scientific classification
- Kingdom: Animalia
- Phylum: Arthropoda
- Class: Insecta
- Order: Lepidoptera
- Family: Gelechiidae
- Subfamily: Gelechiinae
- Tribe: Gelechiini
- Genus: Stegasta; Meyrick, 1904

= Stegasta =

Genus of moths

Stegasta is a genus of moths in the family Gelechiidae.

== Species ==
- Stegasta abdita Park & Omelko, 1994 (from Siberia)
- Stegasta allactis Meyrick, 1904 (from Australia)
- Stegasta biniveipunctata (Walsingham, 1897) (from Grenada)
- Stegasta bosqueella (Chambers, 1875) (from North America)
- Stegasta capitella (Fabricius, 1794) (from the West Indies)
- Stegasta comissata Meyrick, 1923 (from Brazil)
- Stegasta cosmodes (Lower, 1899) (from Australia)
- Stegasta francisci Landry, 2010 (from Galapagos)
- Stegasta jejuensis Park & Omelko, 1994 (from Siberia, Korea, Japan)
- Stegasta postpallescens (Walsingham, 1897) (from the West Indies)
- Stegasta sattleri Bidzilya & Mey, 2011 (from Congo, Ethiopia, Madagascar, Namibia, Tanzania, Zambia)
- Stegasta scoteropis Meyrick, 1931 (from Brazil)
- Stegasta tenebricosa Turner, 1919 (from Australia)
- Stegasta variana Meyrick, 1904 (from Australia, southeast Asia, Africa)
- Stegasta zygotoma Meyrick, 1917 (from Colombia, Ecuador and Peru)
