= Stegasta sattleri =

Scientific classification
- Kingdom: Animalia
- Phylum: Arthropoda
- Clade: Pancrustacea
- Class: Insecta
- Order: Lepidoptera
- Family: Gelechiidae
- Genus: Stegasta
- Species: S. sattleri

Binomial name
- Stegasta sattleri Bidzilya & Mey, 2011

Species of moth

Stegasta sattleri is a moth of the family Gelechiidae. It was described by Oleksiy V. Bidzilya and Wolfram Mey in 2011. It is found in the Democratic Republic of the Congo (Orientale), Ethiopia, Madagascar, Namibia, Tanzania and Zambia.
