= Stegasta francisci =

Scientific classification
- Kingdom: Animalia
- Phylum: Arthropoda
- Clade: Pancrustacea
- Class: Insecta
- Order: Lepidoptera
- Family: Gelechiidae
- Genus: Stegasta
- Species: S. francisci

Binomial name
- Stegasta francisci Landry, 2010

Species of moth

Stegasta francisci is a moth of the family Gelechiidae. It was described by Bernard Landry in 2010. It is found on the Galápagos Islands and in continental Ecuador.
