= Stegasta comissata =

Scientific classification
- Kingdom: Animalia
- Phylum: Arthropoda
- Class: Insecta
- Order: Lepidoptera
- Family: Gelechiidae
- Genus: Stegasta
- Species: S. comissata

Binomial name
- Stegasta comissata Meyrick, 1923

Species of moth

Stegasta comissata is a moth of the family Gelechiidae. It was described by Edward Meyrick in 1923. It is found in Amazonas, Brazil.

The wingspan is 8–10 mm. The forewings are blackish fuscous with a pale ochreous fascia at one-fourth, broad on the dorsum and diminishing to the costa, where it is narrow and white, somewhat silvery mixed and sometimes grey speckled on the dorsum. There is a subtriangular pale ochreous sometimes grey sprinkled blotch on the median area of the dorsum, confluent with preceding and connected by a leaden-metallic bar with a white spot on the middle of the costa. A large subquadrate white spot is found on the costa at three-fourths, connected by a leaden bar with the tornus. There is also a small silvery-whitish dot beneath the apex. The hindwings are grey.
