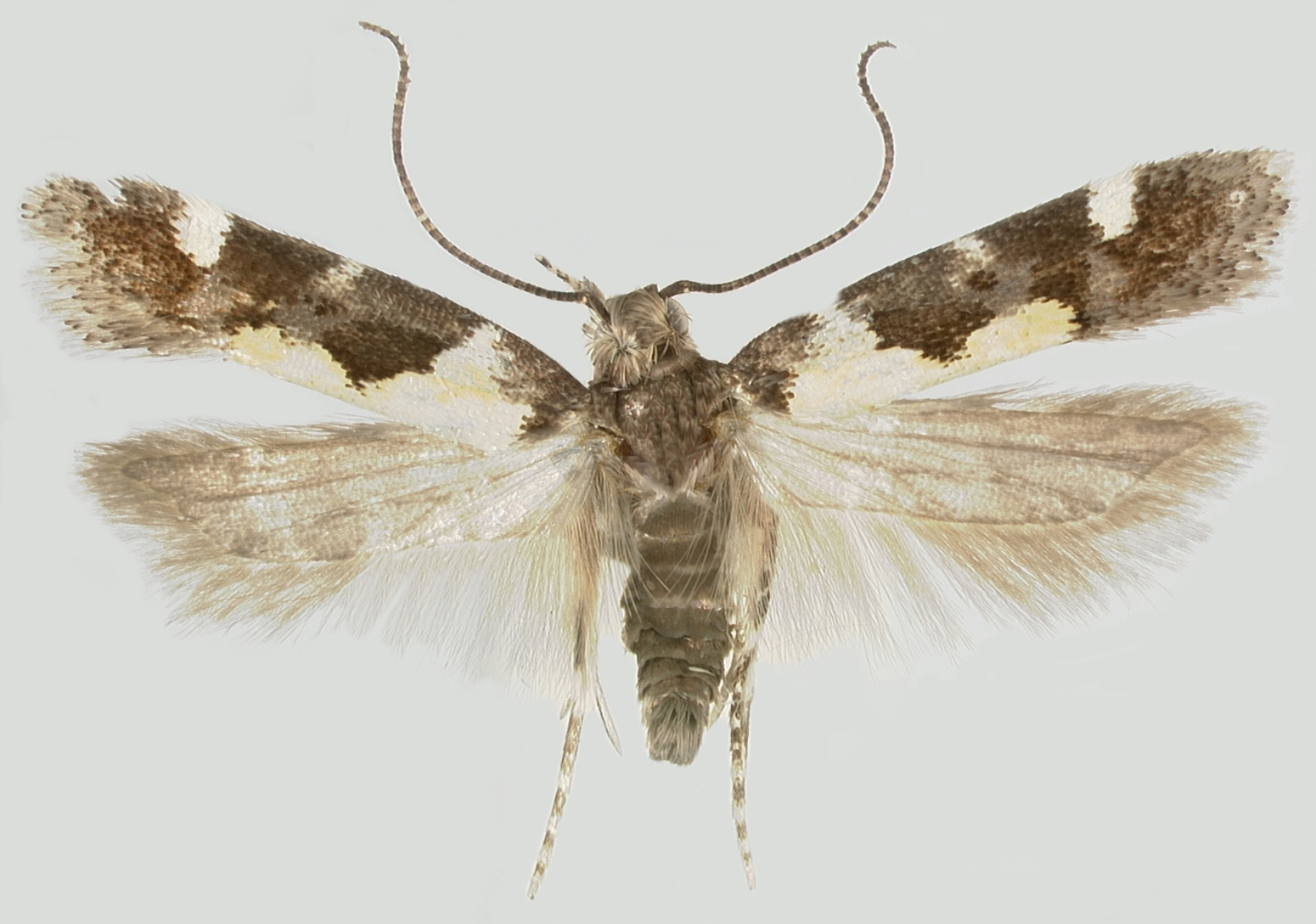

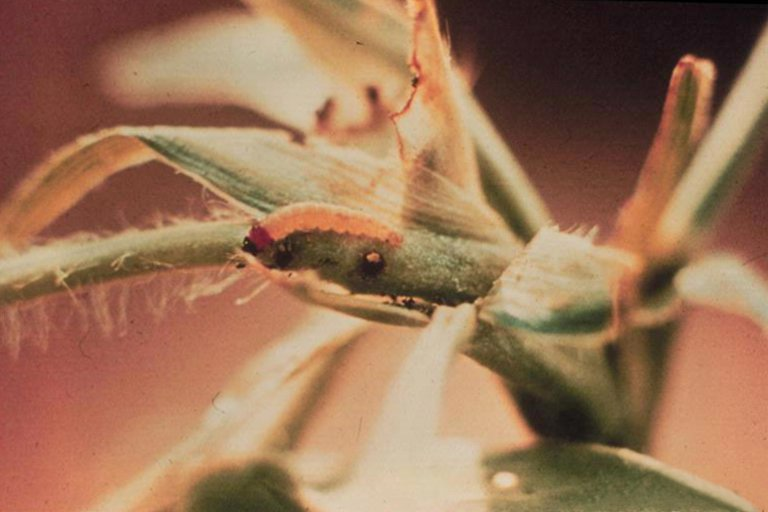

Scientific classification
- Kingdom: Animalia
- Phylum: Arthropoda
- Clade: Pancrustacea
- Class: Insecta
- Order: Lepidoptera
- Family: Gelechiidae
- Genus: Stegasta
- Species: S. bosqueella

Binomial name
- Stegasta bosqueella (Chambers, 1875)

Synonyms
- Oecophora basqueella Chambers, 1875; Stegasta basqueella; Parastega bosqueella; Parastega basqueella; Stegasta basqueella; Gelechia basqueella; Gelechia bosqueella; Gelechia costipunctella Möschler, 1890

= Stegasta bosqueella =

Species of moth

Stegasta bosqueella (red-necked peanutworm moth) is a species of moth of the family Gelechiidae. It is found in North America, including Alabama, Florida, Georgia, Illinois, Iowa, North Carolina, Oklahoma, South Carolina, Texas and Virginia.

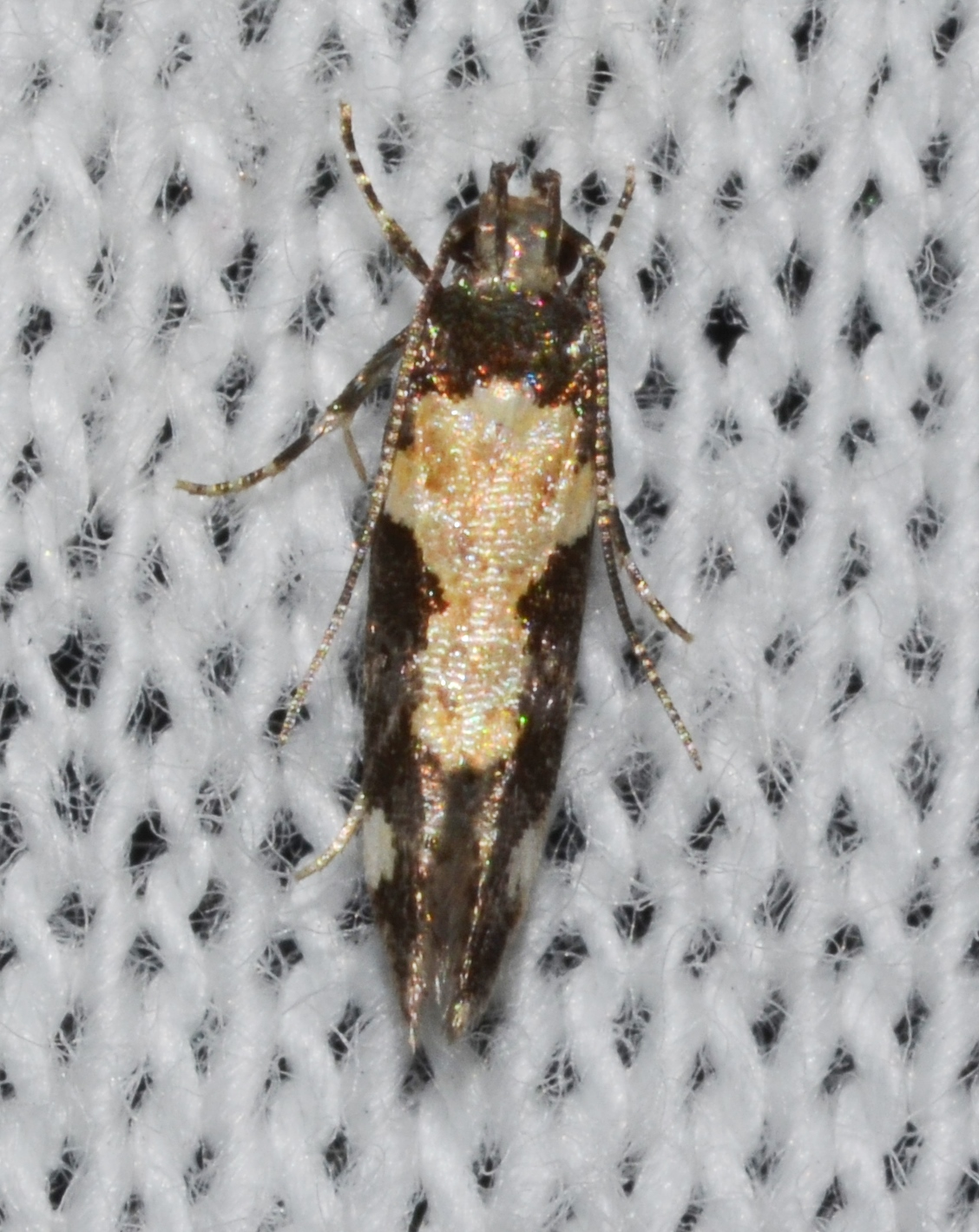

The larvae are a pest on Arachis hypogaea. They feed on the foliage of their host plant.
