= Stegasta scoteropis =

Scientific classification
- Kingdom: Animalia
- Phylum: Arthropoda
- Class: Insecta
- Order: Lepidoptera
- Family: Gelechiidae
- Genus: Stegasta
- Species: S. scoteropis

Binomial name
- Stegasta scoteropis Meyrick, 1931

Species of moth

Stegasta scoteropis is a moth of the family Gelechiidae. It was described by Edward Meyrick in 1931. It is found in Brazil.
