= Stegasta zygotoma =

Scientific classification
- Domain: Eukaryota
- Kingdom: Animalia
- Phylum: Arthropoda
- Class: Insecta
- Order: Lepidoptera
- Family: Gelechiidae
- Genus: Stegasta
- Species: S. zygotoma

Binomial name
- Stegasta zygotoma Meyrick, 1917

Species of moth

Stegasta zygotoma is a moth of the family Gelechiidae. It was described by Edward Meyrick in 1917. It is found in Colombia, Ecuador, Peru and on the Galápagos Islands

The wingspan is 9–11 mm. The forewings are dark fuscous, sometimes suffused with deep ferruginous bronze, slightly whitish sprinkled. There are two connected ochreous-white triangular blotches occupying the dorsum from near the base to near the tornus, sometimes much suffused with grey sprinkles, especially dorsally, the first narrowly reaching the costa at one-fifth, the second reaching nearly halfway across the wing, its apex connected with an indistinct whitish dot on the middle of the costa by a faint grey or grey-whitish cloud in which is a more or less strongly expressed blackish dot, representing the first discal stigma. The second discal stigma is close beyond this, blackish, sometimes edged below with white or yellowish, or obsolete. There is also a slightly inwards-oblique transverse white spot on the costa at three-fourths, tending to connect with a leaden-grey spot on the tornus and the apical area is sometimes sprinkled with grey whitish. The hindwings are grey or light grey, darker posteriorly.
