= Schizovalva anisofascia =

Scientific classification
- Kingdom: Animalia
- Phylum: Arthropoda
- Class: Insecta
- Order: Lepidoptera
- Family: Gelechiidae
- Genus: Schizovalva
- Species: S. anisofascia

Binomial name
- Schizovalva anisofascia Janse, 1960

Species of moth

Schizovalva anisofascia is a moth of the family Gelechiidae. It was described by Anthonie Johannes Theodorus Janse in 1960. It is found in South Africa.
