= Stomopteryx hungaricella =

Scientific classification
- Kingdom: Animalia
- Phylum: Arthropoda
- Clade: Pancrustacea
- Class: Insecta
- Order: Lepidoptera
- Family: Gelechiidae
- Genus: Stomopteryx
- Species: S. hungaricella

Binomial name
- Stomopteryx hungaricella Gozmány, 1957

Species of moth

Stomopteryx hungaricella is a moth of the family Gelechiidae. It was described by László Anthony Gozmány in 1957. It is found in France, the Czech Republic, Slovakia, Hungary, Romania, as well as on Sardinia and Crete.

Adults are similar to Stomopteryx orthogonella, but nearly uniformly black rather than brown, and without any trace of streaks or spots.
