= Caffrocrambus leucofascialis =

Scientific classification
- Kingdom: Animalia
- Phylum: Arthropoda
- Clade: Pancrustacea
- Class: Insecta
- Order: Lepidoptera
- Family: Crambidae
- Subfamily: Crambinae
- Tribe: Crambini
- Genus: Caffrocrambus
- Species: C. leucofascialis

Binomial name
- Caffrocrambus leucofascialis (Janse, 1922)

Synonyms
- Crambus leucofascialis Janse, 1922

Species of moth

Caffrocrambus leucofascialis is a moth in the family Crambidae. It was described by Anthonie Johannes Theodorus Janse in 1922. It is found in South Africa, where it has been recorded from Gauteng.
