= Schizovalva ebenostriga =

Scientific classification
- Domain: Eukaryota
- Kingdom: Animalia
- Phylum: Arthropoda
- Class: Insecta
- Order: Lepidoptera
- Family: Gelechiidae
- Genus: Schizovalva
- Species: S. ebenostriga

Binomial name
- Schizovalva ebenostriga Janse, 1960

Synonyms
- Gelechia dryadopis Meyrick, 1926

Species of moth

Schizovalva ebenostriga is a moth of the family Gelechiidae. It was described by Anthonie Johannes Theodorus Janse in 1960. It is found in South Africa.

The wingspan is about 17 mm. The forewings are light brownish ochreous sprinkled with rather dark fuscous. The base of the costa is suffusedly irrorated dark fuscous and the stigmata are blackish, the plical rather obliquely before the first discal, a small blackish dot between the first and second discal, some irregular fuscous suffusion between the stigmata. There is an undefined spot of fuscous suffusion on the costa at two-thirds and a marginal series of small irregular dark fuscous dots on the posterior part of the costa and termen. The hindwings are pale grey.
