= Pyncostola alloea =

Scientific classification
- Domain: Eukaryota
- Kingdom: Animalia
- Phylum: Arthropoda
- Class: Insecta
- Order: Lepidoptera
- Family: Gelechiidae
- Genus: Pyncostola
- Species: P. alloea

Binomial name
- Pyncostola alloea Janse, 1960

Species of moth

Pyncostola alloea is a moth of the family Gelechiidae. It was described by Anthonie Johannes Theodorus Janse in 1960. It is found in South Africa, where it has been recorded from the Western Cape.
