= Lecithocera aenicta =

Scientific classification
- Domain: Eukaryota
- Kingdom: Animalia
- Phylum: Arthropoda
- Class: Insecta
- Order: Lepidoptera
- Family: Lecithoceridae
- Genus: Lecithocera
- Species: L. aenicta

Binomial name
- Lecithocera aenicta Janse, 1954

Species of moth in genus Lecithocera

Lecithocera aenicta is a moth in the family Lecithoceridae. It was described by Anthonie Johannes Theodorus Janse in 1954. It is found in South Africa.
