= Stomopteryx trachyphylla =

Scientific classification
- Domain: Eukaryota
- Kingdom: Animalia
- Phylum: Arthropoda
- Class: Insecta
- Order: Lepidoptera
- Family: Gelechiidae
- Genus: Stomopteryx
- Species: S. trachyphylla

Binomial name
- Stomopteryx trachyphylla Janse, 1960

Species of moth

Stomopteryx trachyphylla is a moth of the family Gelechiidae. It was described by Anthonie Johannes Theodorus Janse in 1960. It is found in South Africa.
