= Schizovalva xylotincta =

Scientific classification
- Kingdom: Animalia
- Phylum: Arthropoda
- Clade: Pancrustacea
- Class: Insecta
- Order: Lepidoptera
- Family: Gelechiidae
- Genus: Schizovalva
- Species: S. xylotincta

Binomial name
- Schizovalva xylotincta Janse, 1951

Species of moth

Schizovalva xylotincta is a moth of the family Gelechiidae. It was described by Anthonie Johannes Theodorus Janse in 1951. It is found in South Africa.
