= Stomopteryx delotypa =

Scientific classification
- Domain: Eukaryota
- Kingdom: Animalia
- Phylum: Arthropoda
- Class: Insecta
- Order: Lepidoptera
- Family: Gelechiidae
- Genus: Stomopteryx
- Species: S. delotypa

Binomial name
- Stomopteryx delotypa (Janse, 1963)

Synonyms
- Acraeologa delotypa Janse, 1963

Species of moth

Stomopteryx delotypa is a moth of the family Gelechiidae. It was described by Anthonie Johannes Theodorus Janse in 1963. It is found in South Africa.
