= Stomopteryx xanthobasalis =

Scientific classification
- Kingdom: Animalia
- Phylum: Arthropoda
- Clade: Pancrustacea
- Class: Insecta
- Order: Lepidoptera
- Family: Gelechiidae
- Genus: Stomopteryx
- Species: S. xanthobasalis

Binomial name
- Stomopteryx xanthobasalis (Janse, 1963)

Synonyms
- Acraeologa xanthobasalis Janse, 1963

Species of moth

Stomopteryx xanthobasalis is a moth of the family Gelechiidae. It was described by Anthonie Johannes Theodorus Janse in 1963. It is found in South Africa.
