= Pyncostola flavostriga =

Scientific classification
- Domain: Eukaryota
- Kingdom: Animalia
- Phylum: Arthropoda
- Class: Insecta
- Order: Lepidoptera
- Family: Gelechiidae
- Genus: Pyncostola
- Species: P. flavostriga

Binomial name
- Pyncostola flavostriga Janse, 1950

Species of moth

Pyncostola flavostriga is a moth of the family Gelechiidae. It was described by Anthonie Johannes Theodorus Janse in 1950. It is found in South Africa, where it has been recorded from KwaZulu-Natal.
