= Schizovalva prioleuca =

Scientific classification
- Kingdom: Animalia
- Phylum: Arthropoda
- Class: Insecta
- Order: Lepidoptera
- Family: Gelechiidae
- Genus: Schizovalva
- Species: S. prioleuca

Binomial name
- Schizovalva prioleuca (Meyrick, 1911)

Synonyms
- Gelechia prioleuca Meyrick, 1911

Species of moth

Schizovalva prioleuca is a moth of the family Gelechiidae. It was described by Edward Meyrick in 1911. It is found in South Africa.

The wingspan is 13–14 mm. The forewings are purple blackish with a white dorsal streak from the base to the tornus, attenuated near the base, the upper edge forming three triangular prominences between one-fourth and the tornus, then continued as a slender irregular streak along the termen to the apex and there is a small white mark on the costa towards the apex. The hindwings are grey.
