= Schizovalva trisignis =

Scientific classification
- Kingdom: Animalia
- Phylum: Arthropoda
- Class: Insecta
- Order: Lepidoptera
- Family: Gelechiidae
- Genus: Schizovalva
- Species: S. trisignis

Binomial name
- Schizovalva trisignis (Meyrick, 1908)

Synonyms
- Gelechia trisignis Meyrick, 1908

Species of moth

Schizovalva trisignis is a moth of the family Gelechiidae. It was described by Edward Meyrick in 1908. It is found in Gauteng, South Africa.

The wingspan is about 16 mm. The forewings are very dark bronzy fuscous with a rather broad ochreous-whitish costal stripe from the base to near the apex, narrowed posteriorly. There is a rather narrower ochreous-white dorsal stripe from the base to the tornus, narrowed to the extremities. The hindwings are light grey.
