= Schizovalva alaopis =

Scientific classification
- Kingdom: Animalia
- Phylum: Arthropoda
- Class: Insecta
- Order: Lepidoptera
- Family: Gelechiidae
- Genus: Schizovalva
- Species: S. alaopis

Binomial name
- Schizovalva alaopis (Meyrick, 1921)

Synonyms
- Stomopteryx alaopis Meyrick, 1921

Species of moth

Schizovalva alaopis is a moth of the family Gelechiidae. It was described by Edward Meyrick in 1921. It is found in South Africa.

The wingspan is 12–14 mm. The forewings are dark purplish fuscous. The stigmata are cloudy, obscurely darker, the plical obliquely before the first discal. The hindwings are grey.
