= Caffrocrambus sordidella =

Scientific classification
- Kingdom: Animalia
- Phylum: Arthropoda
- Clade: Pancrustacea
- Class: Insecta
- Order: Lepidoptera
- Family: Crambidae
- Subfamily: Crambinae
- Tribe: Crambini
- Genus: Caffrocrambus
- Species: C. sordidella

Binomial name
- Caffrocrambus sordidella (Marion, 1957)

Synonyms
- Culladia sordidella Marion, 1957

Species of moth

Caffrocrambus sordidella is a moth in the family Crambidae. It was described by Hubert Marion in 1957. It is found in Benin.
