= Stomopteryx eremopis =

Scientific classification
- Kingdom: Animalia
- Phylum: Arthropoda
- Class: Insecta
- Order: Lepidoptera
- Family: Gelechiidae
- Genus: Stomopteryx
- Species: S. eremopis

Binomial name
- Stomopteryx eremopis (Meyrick, 1921)

Synonyms
- Leuronoma eremopis Meyrick, 1921

Species of moth

Stomopteryx eremopis is a moth of the family Gelechiidae. It was described by Edward Meyrick in 1921. It is found in Namibia and South Africa.

The wingspan is 12–13 mm. The forewings are grey suffusedly sprinkled with dark fuscous. The stigmata are small and very indistinctly darker, the discal approximated, the plical obliquely before the first discal. The hindwings are bluish grey.
