= Stomopteryx nigricella =

Scientific classification
- Domain: Eukaryota
- Kingdom: Animalia
- Phylum: Arthropoda
- Class: Insecta
- Order: Lepidoptera
- Family: Gelechiidae
- Genus: Stomopteryx
- Species: S. nigricella

Binomial name
- Stomopteryx nigricella (Chrétien, 1915)

Synonyms
- Bryotropha nigricella Chrétien, 1915

Species of moth

Stomopteryx nigricella is a moth of the family Gelechiidae. It is found in Algeria.
