= Pyncostola iospila =

Scientific classification
- Kingdom: Animalia
- Phylum: Arthropoda
- Class: Insecta
- Order: Lepidoptera
- Family: Gelechiidae
- Genus: Pyncostola
- Species: P. iospila

Binomial name
- Pyncostola iospila (Meyrick, 1909)

Synonyms
- Paltodora iospila Meyrick, 1909

Species of moth

Pyncostola iospila is a moth of the family Gelechiidae. It was described by Edward Meyrick in 1909. It is found in Namibia and South Africa, where it has been recorded from the Northern Cape and Gauteng.

The wingspan is about 16 mm. The forewings are whitish tinged with ferruginous. There are ferruginous spots on the costa at the base and one-sixth, the former connected beneath with a fuscous transverse mark. There are two small ferruginous spots beneath the fold rather obliquely beyond these respectively. The costa is suffused with grey irroration (sprinkles) from one-fourth to two-thirds. There is a small ferruginous spot beneath the costa at one-third. The stigmata are represented by small ferruginous spots, the plical very obliquely before the first discal. There is also a suffused grey streak sprinkled with dark grey along the fold beneath the discal stigmata and a fascia of ferruginous suffusion along the termen, preceded by some grey suffusion. The hindwings are pale grey.
