= Stomopteryx frivola =

Scientific classification
- Kingdom: Animalia
- Phylum: Arthropoda
- Class: Insecta
- Order: Lepidoptera
- Family: Gelechiidae
- Genus: Stomopteryx
- Species: S. frivola

Binomial name
- Stomopteryx frivola Meyrick, 1926

Species of moth

Stomopteryx frivola is a moth of the family Gelechiidae. It was described by Edward Meyrick in 1926. It is found in South Africa.

The wingspan is about 15 mm (0.59 in). The forewings are violet grey sprinkled with blackish. The stigmata form small cloudy darker spots followed by slight whitish-grey-ochreous scales, the discal approximated and the plical obliquely before the first discal. There is an irregular whitish angulated transverse line at three-fourths, tinged with greyish ochreous in the disc, on the costa forming a small spot. The hindwings are grey.
