= Schizovalva ophitis =

Scientific classification
- Kingdom: Animalia
- Phylum: Arthropoda
- Class: Insecta
- Order: Lepidoptera
- Family: Gelechiidae
- Genus: Schizovalva
- Species: S. ophitis

Binomial name
- Schizovalva ophitis (Meyrick, 1913)

Synonyms
- Gelechia ophitis Meyrick, 1913

Species of moth

Schizovalva ophitis is a moth of the family Gelechiidae. It was described by Edward Meyrick in 1913. It is found in South Africa.

The wingspan is about 23 mm. The forewings are fuscous, with a few scattered black scales and with some ochreous-whitish suffusion towards the median third of the dorsum. There is a thick black median longitudinal streak from the base to two-thirds, lower edge suffused, upper sharply marked, forming two deep sinuations filled with ochreous whitish before and beyond the middle and a triangular prominence between these. There is a short suffused blackish apical streak, and one less marked beneath it, surrounded with a purplish tinge. The hindwings are fuscous.
