= Stomopteryx prolapsa =

Scientific classification
- Kingdom: Animalia
- Phylum: Arthropoda
- Class: Insecta
- Order: Lepidoptera
- Family: Gelechiidae
- Genus: Stomopteryx
- Species: S. prolapsa

Binomial name
- Stomopteryx prolapsa Meyrick, 1918

Species of moth

Stomopteryx prolapsa is a moth of the family Gelechiidae. It was described by Edward Meyrick in 1918. It is found in Sri Lanka.

The wingspan is about 10 mm. The forewings are dark fuscous with a large white subtriangular spot on the dorsum before the tornus, reaching halfway across the wing, and a similar costal spot slightly beyond and nearly confluent with it. The hindwings are dark grey.
