= Stomopteryx oncodes =

Scientific classification
- Kingdom: Animalia
- Phylum: Arthropoda
- Class: Insecta
- Order: Lepidoptera
- Family: Gelechiidae
- Genus: Stomopteryx
- Species: S. oncodes

Binomial name
- Stomopteryx oncodes (Meyrick, 1913)

Synonyms
- Anacampsis oncodes Meyrick, 1913

Species of moth

Stomopteryx oncodes is a moth of the family Gelechiidae. It was described by Edward Meyrick in 1913. It is found in South Africa.

The wingspan is 18–19 mm. The forewings are dark purplish slaty fuscous. The stigmata are black, with an additional elongate black dot on the fold before the plical, and with the plical obliquely before the first discal, the first discal elongate. There are a few black scales around the apical part of the costa and termen. The hindwings are dark grey.
