= Caffrocrambus =

Scientific classification
- Kingdom: Animalia
- Phylum: Arthropoda
- Clade: Pancrustacea
- Class: Insecta
- Order: Lepidoptera
- Family: Crambidae
- Subfamily: Crambinae
- Tribe: Crambini
- Genus: Caffrocrambus; Bleszynski, 1961

Synonyms
- Anomocrambus Bleszynski, 1961; Caffocrambus Bassi, 1994

Genus of moths

Caffrocrambus is a genus of moths of the family Crambidae.

== Species ==
- Caffrocrambus albifascia Bassi, 2002
- Caffrocrambus albistrigatus Bassi, 2002
- Caffrocrambus alcibiades Bleszynski, 1961
- Caffrocrambus angulilinea (Warren, 1914)
- Caffrocrambus carneades Bassi, 2002
- Caffrocrambus chalcimerus (Hampson, 1919)
- Caffrocrambus decolorelloides Bleszynski, 1970
- Caffrocrambus decolorellus (Walker, 1863)
- Caffrocrambus democritus Bassi, 1994
- Caffrocrambus dichotomellus (Hampson, 1919)
- Caffrocrambus endoxantha (Hampson, 1919)
- Caffrocrambus fulvus Bassi, 2002
- Caffrocrambus fuscus Bassi, 2002
- Caffrocrambus galileii Bassi, 2002
- Caffrocrambus heraclitus Bassi, 1994
- Caffrocrambus homerus (Bleszynski, 1961)
- Caffrocrambus husserli Bassi, 2002
- Caffrocrambus jansei Bassi, 2002
- Caffrocrambus krooni Bassi, 2002
- Caffrocrambus leucippus Bassi, 1994
- Caffrocrambus leucofascialis (Janse, 1922)
- Caffrocrambus luteus Bassi, 2002
- Caffrocrambus machiavellii Bassi, 2002
- Caffrocrambus ochreus Bleszynski, 1970
- Caffrocrambus parmenides Bassi, 1994
- Caffrocrambus polyphemus Bassi, 2002
- Caffrocrambus savonarolae Bassi, 2002
- Caffrocrambus sordidella (Marion, 1957)
- Caffrocrambus szunyoghyi Bassi, 2002
- Caffrocrambus undilineatus (Hampson, 1919)
