= Stomopteryx neftensis =

Scientific classification
- Domain: Eukaryota
- Kingdom: Animalia
- Phylum: Arthropoda
- Class: Insecta
- Order: Lepidoptera
- Family: Gelechiidae
- Genus: Stomopteryx
- Species: S. neftensis

Binomial name
- Stomopteryx neftensis (Dufrane, 1955)

Synonyms
- Bryotropha neftensis Dufrane, 1955; Bryotropha neftensis f. anomalella Dufrane, 1955; Bryotropha nigricella f. griseella Dufrane, 1955

Species of moth

Stomopteryx neftensis is a moth of the family Gelechiidae. It is found in southern Tunisia.
