= Stomopteryx anxia =

Scientific classification
- Kingdom: Animalia
- Phylum: Arthropoda
- Clade: Pancrustacea
- Class: Insecta
- Order: Lepidoptera
- Family: Gelechiidae
- Genus: Stomopteryx
- Species: S. anxia

Binomial name
- Stomopteryx anxia (Meyrick, 1917)

Synonyms
- Parapsectris anxia Meyrick, 1917

Species of moth

Stomopteryx anxia is a moth of the family Gelechiidae. It was described by Edward Meyrick in 1917. It is found in South Africa.

The wingspan is 13 mm. The forewings are whitish ochreous with the costal and terminal edge finely sprinkled with black. The hindwings are grey, darker posteriorly.
