= Stomopteryx circaea =

Scientific classification
- Kingdom: Animalia
- Phylum: Arthropoda
- Class: Insecta
- Order: Lepidoptera
- Family: Gelechiidae
- Genus: Stomopteryx
- Species: S. circaea

Binomial name
- Stomopteryx circaea (Meyrick, 1911)

Synonyms
- Anacampsis circaea Meyrick, 1911

Species of moth

Stomopteryx circaea is a moth of the family Gelechiidae. It was described by Edward Meyrick in 1911. It is found in South Africa.

The wingspan is 16–17 mm. The forewings are dark slaty fuscous. The stigmata are small and black, the discal approximated, the plical obliquely before the first discal. There is a small flattened-triangular pale ochreous-yellowish spot on the costa at two-thirds. The hindwings are rather dark grey.
