= Caffrocrambus parmenides =

Scientific classification
- Kingdom: Animalia
- Phylum: Arthropoda
- Clade: Pancrustacea
- Class: Insecta
- Order: Lepidoptera
- Family: Crambidae
- Subfamily: Crambinae
- Tribe: Crambini
- Genus: Caffrocrambus
- Species: C. parmenides

Binomial name
- Caffrocrambus parmenides Bassi, 1994

Species of moth

Caffrocrambus parmenides is a moth in the family Crambidae. It was described by Graziano Bassi in 1994. It is found in the Democratic Republic of the Congo.
