= Stomopteryx pelomicta =

Scientific classification
- Kingdom: Animalia
- Phylum: Arthropoda
- Class: Insecta
- Order: Lepidoptera
- Family: Gelechiidae
- Genus: Stomopteryx
- Species: S. pelomicta

Binomial name
- Stomopteryx pelomicta Meyrick, 1928

Species of moth

Stomopteryx pelomicta is a moth of the family Gelechiidae. It was described by Edward Meyrick in 1928. It is found in Atlas Mountains.
