= Stomopteryx flavipalpella =

Scientific classification
- Domain: Eukaryota
- Kingdom: Animalia
- Phylum: Arthropoda
- Class: Insecta
- Order: Lepidoptera
- Family: Gelechiidae
- Genus: Stomopteryx
- Species: S. flavipalpella

Binomial name
- Stomopteryx flavipalpella Jäckh, 1959

Species of moth

Stomopteryx flavipalpella is a moth of the family Gelechiidae. It was described by Jäckh in 1959. It is found in Portugal, Spain, France, Germany, Austria, Italy and since 2022 in Belgium.
