= Schizovalva =

Scientific classification
- Kingdom: Animalia
- Phylum: Arthropoda
- Class: Insecta
- Order: Lepidoptera
- Family: Gelechiidae
- Tribe: Gelechiini
- Genus: Schizovalva; Janse, 1951

Type species
- Gelechia trisignis Meyrick, 1908

Genus of moths

Schizovalva is a genus of moths in the family Gelechiidae.

== Species ==
- Schizovalva ablepta Janse, 1960
- Schizovalva adelosema Janse, 1960
- Schizovalva alaopis (Meyrick, 1921)
- Schizovalva anisofascia Janse, 1960
- Schizovalva bistrigata Janse, 1951
- Schizovalva blumenzweigella Legrand, 1958
- Schizovalva brunneotincta Janse, 1951
- Schizovalva brunneovesta Janse, 1960
- Schizovalva catharodes (Meyrick, 1920)
- Schizovalva celidota Janse, 1960
- Schizovalva cyrtogramma Janse, 1960
- Schizovalva ebenostriga Janse, 1960
- Schizovalva episema Janse, 1960
- Schizovalva exsulata (Meyrick, 1918)
- Schizovalva guillarmodi Janse, 1960
- Schizovalva hyperythra (Meyrick, 1921)
- Schizovalva isochorda (Meyrick, 1921)
- Schizovalva isophanes Janse, 1960
- Schizovalva leontianella Legrand, 1966
- Schizovalva leptochroa Janse, 1960
- Schizovalva leucogrisea Janse, 1951
- Schizovalva matutina (Meyrick, 1913)
- Schizovalva mesacta (Meyrick, 1909)
- Schizovalva naufraga (Meyrick, 1911)
- Schizovalva nigrifasciata Janse, 1951
- Schizovalva nigrosema Janse, 1960
- Schizovalva nubila Janse, 1960
- Schizovalva ochnias (Meyrick, 1913)
- Schizovalva ochrotincta Janse, 1951
- Schizovalva ophitis (Meyrick, 1913)
- Schizovalva perirrorata Janse, 1951
- Schizovalva peronectis (Meyrick, 1909)
- Schizovalva polygramma (Meyrick, 1914)
- Schizovalva prioleuca (Meyrick, 1911)
- Schizovalva rhodochra (Meyrick, 1913)
- Schizovalva rubigitincta Janse, 1951
- Schizovalva sarcographa (Meyrick, 1917)
- Schizovalva sphenopis (Meyrick, 1921)
- Schizovalva stasiarcha (Meyrick, 1913)
- Schizovalva trachypalpella Janse, 1960
- Schizovalva triplacopis (Meyrick, 1912)
- Schizovalva trisignis (Meyrick, 1908)
- Schizovalva unitincta Janse, 1960
- Schizovalva xerochroa Janse, 1951
- Schizovalva xylotincta Janse, 1951

=== Species recently removed from this genus ===
- Schizovalva exoenota (Meyrick, 1918) to Armatophallus exoenota (Meyrick, 1918)
