= Stomopteryx maculatella =

Scientific classification
- Domain: Eukaryota
- Kingdom: Animalia
- Phylum: Arthropoda
- Class: Insecta
- Order: Lepidoptera
- Family: Gelechiidae
- Genus: Stomopteryx
- Species: S. maculatella

Binomial name
- Stomopteryx maculatella (D. Lucas, 1956)

Synonyms
- Deuterotinea maculatella D. Lucas, 1956

Species of moth

Stomopteryx maculatella is a moth of the family Gelechiidae. It was described by Daniel Lucas in 1956. It is found in Morocco.
