= Pyncostola melanatracta =

Scientific classification
- Kingdom: Animalia
- Phylum: Arthropoda
- Class: Insecta
- Order: Lepidoptera
- Family: Gelechiidae
- Genus: Pyncostola
- Species: P. melanatracta

Binomial name
- Pyncostola melanatracta (Meyrick, 1910)

Synonyms
- Paltodora melanatracta Meyrick, 1910

Species of moth

Pyncostola melanatracta is a moth of the family Gelechiidae. It was described by Edward Meyrick in 1910. It is found in Zimbabwe and South Africa, where it has been recorded from Mpumalanga, Limpopo, Gauteng and the North-West Province.

The wingspan is 19–21 mm. The forewings are fuscous whitish, sometimes partially suffused with pale fuscous, with scattered blackish scales, especially towards the apex. The costa is sometimes suffused with blackish towards the base and there is a black streak on the sub-median fold from the base to one-third, the apex acute. There is sometimes a black dot beneath the costa near the base. The stigmata are rather large and black, the plical very obliquely before the first discal, the first discal somewhat beyond the middle, in one specimen nearly obsolete. The hindwings are light grey.
