= Schizovalva rhodochra =

Scientific classification
- Kingdom: Animalia
- Phylum: Arthropoda
- Class: Insecta
- Order: Lepidoptera
- Family: Gelechiidae
- Genus: Schizovalva
- Species: S. rhodochra

Binomial name
- Schizovalva rhodochra (Meyrick, 1913)

Synonyms
- Gelechia rhodochra Meyrick, 1913

Species of moth

Schizovalva rhodochra is a moth of the family Gelechiidae. It was described by Edward Meyrick in 1913. It is found in South Africa.

The wingspan is 17–18 mm. The forewings are rosy ochreous, the costa suffused with light yellow ochreous and the costal edge black at the base. There is a black streak along the basal third of the dorsum and the plical stigma is well marked and black. The second discal is minute, blackish, between this and the termen is a spot of fuscous suffusion and there is a more or less developed fuscous spot on the costa at two-thirds, sometimes little marked. A few fuscous scales are found on the termen. The hindwings are grey.
