= Stomopteryx credula =

Scientific classification
- Kingdom: Animalia
- Phylum: Arthropoda
- Class: Insecta
- Order: Lepidoptera
- Family: Gelechiidae
- Genus: Stomopteryx
- Species: S. credula

Binomial name
- Stomopteryx credula (Meyrick, 1927)

Synonyms
- Leuronoma credula Meyrick, 1927

Species of moth

Stomopteryx credula is a moth of the family Gelechiidae. It was described by Edward Meyrick in 1927. It is found in Zimbabwe.

The wingspan is about 17 mm. The forewings are pale ochreous. The stigmata are black, with the plical very obliquely before the first discal. The hindwings are pale grey.
