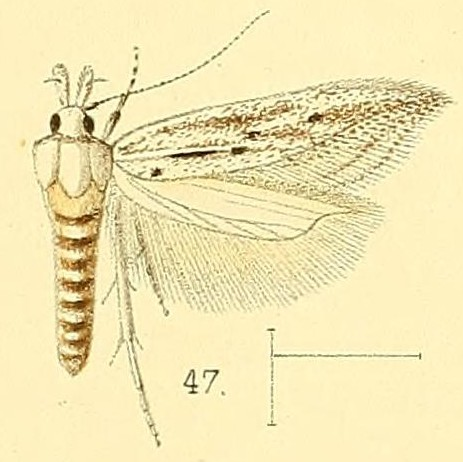

Scientific classification
- Domain: Eukaryota
- Kingdom: Animalia
- Phylum: Arthropoda
- Class: Insecta
- Order: Lepidoptera
- Family: Gelechiidae
- Genus: Pyncostola
- Species: P. suffusellus

Binomial name
- Pyncostola suffusellus (Walsingham, 1891)

Synonyms
- Megacraspedus suffusellus Walsingham, 1891

= Pyncostola suffusellus =

Species of moth

Pyncostola suffusellus is a moth of the family Gelechiidae. It was described by Thomas de Grey, 6th Baron Walsingham, in 1891. It is found in South Africa, where it has been recorded from KwaZulu-Natal, Mpumalanga, the Eastern Cape and the Western Cape.

The wingspan is about 18 mm. The forewings are whitish, dusted with cinereous, the darker dusting forming diffused and by no means distinct spot-like marks below the costa at the basal third, at the end of the cell, and on the fold. The hindwings are very pointed, with margin deeply excised below the apex, shining bone-white.
