= Stomopteryx praecipitata =

Scientific classification
- Kingdom: Animalia
- Phylum: Arthropoda
- Class: Insecta
- Order: Lepidoptera
- Family: Gelechiidae
- Genus: Stomopteryx
- Species: S. praecipitata

Binomial name
- Stomopteryx praecipitata Meyrick, 1918

Species of moth

Stomopteryx praecipitata is a moth of the family Gelechiidae. It was described by Edward Meyrick in 1918. It is found in southern India and Bengal.

The wingspan is 7–8 mm. The forewings are dark fuscous, with the plical stigma obscurely blackish. There is a straight direct rather irregular-edged narrow white fascia at two-thirds, in one specimen reduced and almost obsolete dorsally. The hindwings are rather dark grey.
