= Pyncostola pammacha =

Scientific classification
- Kingdom: Animalia
- Phylum: Arthropoda
- Class: Insecta
- Order: Lepidoptera
- Family: Gelechiidae
- Genus: Pyncostola
- Species: P. pammacha

Binomial name
- Pyncostola pammacha (Meyrick, 1913)

Synonyms
- Paltodora pammacha Meyrick, 1913

Species of moth

Pyncostola pammacha is a moth of the family Gelechiidae. It was described by Edward Meyrick in 1913. It is found in South Africa, where it has been recorded from Mpumalanga, KwaZulu-Natal, Gauteng and the Eastern Cape.

The wingspan is 19–21 mm. The forewings are grey, more or less sprinkled or suffused with whitish. The costa is darker, towards the base suffused with blackish. There are two small black dots beneath the costa at one-fifth and one-third and a slender black streak from the base along the fold, terminated by the plical stigma, which is obliquely before the first discal. The discal stigmata are black, the first elongate, the second dot like, placed in a pale yellow-ochreous streak running from the first to a blackish streak which extends from the apex along the upper part of the termen. The hindwings are grey or dark grey.
