= Stomopteryx xerochroa =

Scientific classification
- Kingdom: Animalia
- Phylum: Arthropoda
- Class: Insecta
- Order: Lepidoptera
- Family: Gelechiidae
- Genus: Stomopteryx
- Species: S. xerochroa

Binomial name
- Stomopteryx xerochroa (Meyrick, 1921)

Synonyms
- Acraeologa xerochroa Meyrick, 1921

Species of moth

Stomopteryx xerochroa is a moth of the family Gelechiidae. It was described by Edward Meyrick in 1921. It is found in South Africa.

The wingspan is about 17 mm. The forewings are pale greyish ochreous irregularly sprinkled with fuscous, paler in the disc posteriorly and along the fold. There is an elongate fuscous dot beneath the costa near the base, and one midway between the plical stigma and the base. The stigmata are represented by elongate fuscous dots, with the plical rather obliquely before the first discal, and with an elongate mark between the first and second discal. The hindwings are pale bluish grey.
