= Stomopteryx bivittella =

Scientific classification
- Domain: Eukaryota
- Kingdom: Animalia
- Phylum: Arthropoda
- Class: Insecta
- Order: Lepidoptera
- Family: Gelechiidae
- Genus: Stomopteryx
- Species: S. bivittella

Binomial name
- Stomopteryx bivittella (Chrétien, 1915)

Synonyms
- Anacampsis bivittella Chrétien, 1915

Species of moth

Stomopteryx bivittella is a moth of the family Gelechiidae. It was described by Pierre Chrétien in 1915. It is found in Tunisia.

The wingspan is 11–15 mm. The forewings are white with a subcostal band. The hindwings are whitish.
