= Schizovalva exsulata =

Scientific classification
- Kingdom: Animalia
- Phylum: Arthropoda
- Class: Insecta
- Order: Lepidoptera
- Family: Gelechiidae
- Genus: Schizovalva
- Species: S. exsulata

Binomial name
- Schizovalva exsulata (Meyrick, 1918)

Synonyms
- Anacampsis exsulata Meyrick, 1918

Species of moth

Schizovalva exsulata is a moth of the family Gelechiidae. It was described by Edward Meyrick in 1918. It is found in South Africa.

The wingspan is about 12 mm. The forewings are blackish with a moderately broad irregular-edged ochreous-whitish dorsal streak from the base to the tornus, its upper edge rather triangular-prominent at the middle and three-fourths of the length. There is a short oblique ochreous-white streak from the costa at four-fifths and a triangular clear white spot occupying the lower two-thirds of the termen. The hindwings are grey.
