= Pyncostola hiberna =

Scientific classification
- Kingdom: Animalia
- Phylum: Arthropoda
- Class: Insecta
- Order: Lepidoptera
- Family: Gelechiidae
- Genus: Pyncostola
- Species: P. hiberna

Binomial name
- Pyncostola hiberna (Meyrick, 1912)

Synonyms
- Paltodora hiberna Meyrick, 1912

Species of moth

Pyncostola hiberna is a moth of the family Gelechiidae. It was described by Edward Meyrick in 1912. It is found in South Africa, where it has been recorded from KwaZulu-Natal.

The wingspan is 13–14 mm. The forewings are white, sprinkled with dark fuscous in males and with grey in females. There are undefined spots of dark fuscous irroration (sprinkles) on the fold at one-fourth of the wing, and towards the costa at two-fifths. The stigmata are dark fuscous, the plical very obliquely before the first discal, both these in one specimen little marked, the second discal followed by an undefined streak of dark fuscous suffusion extended towards the apex. The hindwings are pale grey or whitish grey.
