= Stomopteryx falkovitshi =

Scientific classification
- Kingdom: Animalia
- Phylum: Arthropoda
- Clade: Pancrustacea
- Class: Insecta
- Order: Lepidoptera
- Family: Gelechiidae
- Genus: Stomopteryx
- Species: S. falkovitshi

Binomial name
- Stomopteryx falkovitshi Piskunov, 1987

Species of moth

Stomopteryx falkovitshi is a moth of the family Gelechiidae. It was described by Piskunov in 1987. It is found in Uzbekistan.
