= Stomopteryx diplodoxa =

Scientific classification
- Kingdom: Animalia
- Phylum: Arthropoda
- Class: Insecta
- Order: Lepidoptera
- Family: Gelechiidae
- Genus: Stomopteryx
- Species: S. diplodoxa

Binomial name
- Stomopteryx diplodoxa Meyrick, 1936

Species of moth

Stomopteryx diplodoxa is a moth of the family Gelechiidae. It was described by Edward Meyrick in 1936. It is found in Tunisia.
