= Stomopteryx calligoni =

Scientific classification
- Kingdom: Animalia
- Phylum: Arthropoda
- Clade: Pancrustacea
- Class: Insecta
- Order: Lepidoptera
- Family: Gelechiidae
- Genus: Stomopteryx
- Species: S. calligoni

Binomial name
- Stomopteryx calligoni Piskunov, 1982

Species of moth

Stomopteryx calligoni is a moth of the family Gelechiidae. It was described by Piskunov in 1982. It is found in Mongolia.
