= Schizovalva naufraga =

Scientific classification
- Kingdom: Animalia
- Phylum: Arthropoda
- Class: Insecta
- Order: Lepidoptera
- Family: Gelechiidae
- Genus: Schizovalva
- Species: S. naufraga

Binomial name
- Schizovalva naufraga (Meyrick, 1911)

Synonyms
- Gelechia naufraga Meyrick, 1911

Species of moth

Schizovalva naufraga is a moth of the family Gelechiidae. It was described by Edward Meyrick in 1911. It is found in South Africa.

The wingspan is about 18 mm. The forewings are dark fuscous, slightly purplish tinged, suffused with blackish towards the dorsal streak. There is a moderately broad whitish-ochreous dorsal stripe from the base to the tornus, the extremities pointed, the upper edge slightly prominent at one-fourth and in the middle of the wing, with a marked triangular prominence before the tornus. The hindwings are grey.
