= Stomopteryx speciosella =

Scientific classification
- Kingdom: Animalia
- Phylum: Arthropoda
- Clade: Pancrustacea
- Class: Insecta
- Order: Lepidoptera
- Family: Gelechiidae
- Genus: Stomopteryx
- Species: S. speciosella

Binomial name
- Stomopteryx speciosella Zerny, 1936

Species of moth

Stomopteryx speciosella is a moth of the family Gelechiidae. It was described by Hans Zerny in 1936. It is found in Morocco.
