= Stomopteryx basalis =

Scientific classification
- Kingdom: Animalia
- Phylum: Arthropoda
- Clade: Pancrustacea
- Class: Insecta
- Order: Lepidoptera
- Family: Gelechiidae
- Genus: Stomopteryx
- Species: S. basalis

Binomial name
- Stomopteryx basalis (Staudinger, 1876)

Synonyms
- Anacampsis basalis Staudinger, 1876; Gelechia oxychalca Meyrick, 1937

Species of moth

Stomopteryx basalis is a moth of the family Gelechiidae. It was described by Staudinger in 1876. It is found in Portugal, France, Italy, and on Corsica, Sicily, Malta, Crete and Cyprus.

The wingspan is about 15 millimetres (0.59 in).
