= Schizovalva isochorda =

Scientific classification
- Kingdom: Animalia
- Phylum: Arthropoda
- Class: Insecta
- Order: Lepidoptera
- Family: Gelechiidae
- Genus: Schizovalva
- Species: S. isochorda

Binomial name
- Schizovalva isochorda (Meyrick, 1921)

Synonyms
- Gelechia isochorda Meyrick, 1921

Species of moth

Schizovalva isochorda is a moth of the family Gelechiidae. It was described by Edward Meyrick in 1921. It is found in South Africa.

The wingspan is about 15 mm. The forewings are dark fuscous with a rather broad ochreous-white dorsal stripe from the base to the tornus, the extremities pointed, the upper edge straight. The hindwings are pale bluish grey.
