= Pyncostola pachyacma =

Scientific classification
- Kingdom: Animalia
- Phylum: Arthropoda
- Class: Insecta
- Order: Lepidoptera
- Family: Gelechiidae
- Genus: Pyncostola
- Species: P. pachyacma

Binomial name
- Pyncostola pachyacma Meyrick, 1926

Species of moth

Pyncostola pachyacma is a moth of the family Gelechiidae. It was described by Edward Meyrick in 1926. It is found in South Africa, where it has been recorded from the Western Cape.

The wingspan is about 20 mm. The forewings are white, irregularly irrorated (sprinkled) with dark grey with a ferruginous-ochreous spot at the base of the dorsum and an oblique bar of dark grey suffusion from the base of the costa to the fold, spotted with ferruginous ochreous on the extremities. There is an oval spot of dark grey irroration suffused with ferruginous ochreous towards the costa at one-third. The stigmata form dark grey spots suffused with larger ferruginous-ochreous spots, the plical obliquely before the first discal. The dorsal edge is shortly ferruginous ochreous before the tornus and a streak of ferruginous-ochreous suffusion along the lower three-fifths of the termen. The hindwings are grey whitish.
