= Caffrocrambus angulilinea =

Scientific classification
- Kingdom: Animalia
- Phylum: Arthropoda
- Clade: Pancrustacea
- Class: Insecta
- Order: Lepidoptera
- Family: Crambidae
- Subfamily: Crambinae
- Tribe: Crambini
- Genus: Caffrocrambus
- Species: C. angulilinea

Binomial name
- Caffrocrambus angulilinea (Warren, 1914)

Synonyms
- Homoeosoma angulilinea Warren, 1914

Species of moth

Caffrocrambus angulilinea is a moth in the family Crambidae. It was described by Warren in 1914. It is found in Namibia and South Africa.
