= Caffrocrambus undilineatus =

Scientific classification
- Kingdom: Animalia
- Phylum: Arthropoda
- Clade: Pancrustacea
- Class: Insecta
- Order: Lepidoptera
- Family: Crambidae
- Subfamily: Crambinae
- Tribe: Crambini
- Genus: Caffrocrambus
- Species: C. undilineatus

Binomial name
- Caffrocrambus undilineatus (Hampson, 1919)#

Synonyms
- Crambus undilineatus Hampson, 1919

Species of moth

Caffrocrambus undilineatus is a moth in the family Crambidae. It was described by George Hampson in 1919. It is found in Kenya and South Africa.
