= Stomopteryx cirrhocoma =

Scientific classification
- Kingdom: Animalia
- Phylum: Arthropoda
- Class: Insecta
- Order: Lepidoptera
- Family: Gelechiidae
- Genus: Stomopteryx
- Species: S. cirrhocoma

Binomial name
- Stomopteryx cirrhocoma (Meyrick, 1914)

Synonyms
- Anacampsis cirrhocoma Meyrick, 1914

Species of moth

Stomopteryx cirrhocoma is a moth of the family Gelechiidae. It was described by Edward Meyrick in 1914. It is found in South Africa.

The wingspan has a wingspan of around 16 mm. Its forewings are dark purplish fuscous in color, with obscure, elongated, blackish stigmata; the discal stigmata are positioned close together, while the plical stigma lies very obliquely before the first discal. The hindwings are grey in coloration.
