= Stomopteryx ochrosema =

Scientific classification
- Kingdom: Animalia
- Phylum: Arthropoda
- Class: Insecta
- Order: Lepidoptera
- Family: Gelechiidae
- Genus: Stomopteryx
- Species: S. ochrosema

Binomial name
- Stomopteryx ochrosema Meyrick, 1932

Species of moth

Stomopteryx ochrosema is a moth of the family Gelechiidae. It was described by Edward Meyrick in 1932. It is found in Ethiopia.
