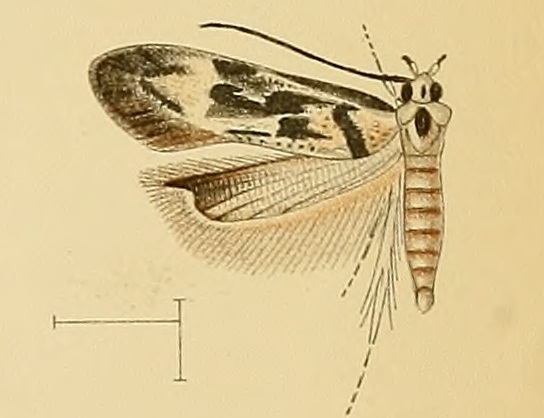
- Stomopteryx schizogynae

Scientific classification
- Kingdom: Animalia
- Phylum: Arthropoda
- Clade: Pancrustacea
- Class: Insecta
- Order: Lepidoptera
- Family: Gelechiidae
- Subfamily: Anacampsinae
- Genus: Stomopteryx; Heinemann, 1870

Synonyms
- Acraeologa Meyrick, 1921; Inotica Meyrick, 1913; Kahelia Turati, 1922

= Stomopteryx =

Genus of moths

Stomopteryx is a genus of moths in the family Gelechiidae.

== Species ==
- Stomopteryx anxia (Meyrick, 1917)
- Stomopteryx argodoris (Meyrick, 1936)
- Stomopteryx basalis (Staudinger, 1876)
- Stomopteryx bathrarcha Meyrick, 1921
- Stomopteryx biangulata Meyrick, 1921
- Stomopteryx bivittella (Chrétien, 1915)
- Stomopteryx bolschewickiella (Caradja, 1920)
- Stomopteryx calligoni Piskunov, 1982
- Stomopteryx circaea (Meyrick, 1911)
- Stomopteryx cirrhocoma (Meyrick, 1914)
- Stomopteryx credula (Meyrick, 1927)
- Stomopteryx delotypa (Janse, 1963)
- Stomopteryx descarpentriesella (Viette, 1956)
- Stomopteryx detersella (Zeller, 1847)
- Stomopteryx deverrae (Walsingham, 1905)
- Stomopteryx difficilis Janse, 1951
- Stomopteryx diplodoxa Meyrick, 1936
- Stomopteryx discolorella Turati, 1924
- Stomopteryx elaeocoma (Meyrick, 1918)
- Stomopteryx eremopis (Meyrick, 1921)
- Stomopteryx falkovitshi Piskunov, 1987
- Stomopteryx flavipalpella Jäckh, 1959
- Stomopteryx flavoclavella Zerny, 1935
- Stomopteryx frivola Meyrick, 1926
- Stomopteryx gaesata (Meyrick, 1913)
- Stomopteryx geryella (Chrétien, 1915)
- Stomopteryx grandidierella (Viette, 1956)
- Stomopteryx hungaricella Gozmány, 1957
- Stomopteryx kermella Chrétien, 1915
- Stomopteryx lacteolella Turati, 1924
- Stomopteryx lineolella Eversmann, 1844
- Stomopteryx luticoma (Meyrick, 1929)
- Stomopteryx maculatella (Lucas, 1956)
- Stomopteryx maledicta Meyrick, 1921
- Stomopteryx maraschella (Caradja, 1920)
- Stomopteryx mongolica Povolný, 1975
- Stomopteryx multilineatella (Lucas, 1932)
- Stomopteryx neftensis (Dufrane, 1955)
- Stomopteryx nigricella (Chrétien, 1915)
- Stomopteryx nugatricella Rebel, 1893
- Stomopteryx ochrosema Meyrick, 1932
- Stomopteryx officiosa Janse, 1951
- Stomopteryx oncodes (Meyrick, 1913)
- Stomopteryx orthogonella (Staudinger, 1871)
- Stomopteryx pallidella Amsel, 1959
- Stomopteryx pallidipes Janse, 1951
- Stomopteryx pelomicta Meyrick, 1928
- Stomopteryx phaeopa Meyrick, 1918
- Stomopteryx plurivittella (Turati, 1930)
- Stomopteryx praecipitata Meyrick, 1918
- Stomopteryx prolapsa Meyrick, 1918
- Stomopteryx quadripunctella Chrétien, 1915
- Stomopteryx radicalis Falkovitsh & Bidzilya, 2003
- Stomopteryx rastrifera Meyrick, 1918
- Stomopteryx remissella (Zeller, 1847)
- Stomopteryx schizogynae (Walsingham, 1908)
- Stomopteryx speciosella Zerny, 1936
- Stomopteryx sphenodoxa Meyrick, 1931
- Stomopteryx splendens (Staudinger, 1881)
- Stomopteryx subnigricella (Dufrane, 1955)
- Stomopteryx symplegadopa Meyrick, 1936
- Stomopteryx tenuisignella Turati, 1924
- Stomopteryx tesserapunctella (Amsel, 1935)
- Stomopteryx thoracica (Meyrick, 1911)
- Stomopteryx trachyphylla Janse, 1960
- Stomopteryx xanthobasalis (Janse, 1963)
- Stomopteryx xerochroa (Meyrick, 1921)
- Stomopteryx zanoni Turati, 1922

== Former species ==
- Stomopteryx elachistella (Stainton, 1859)
