= Stomopteryx gaesata =

Scientific classification
- Kingdom: Animalia
- Phylum: Arthropoda
- Class: Insecta
- Order: Lepidoptera
- Family: Gelechiidae
- Genus: Stomopteryx
- Species: S. gaesata

Binomial name
- Stomopteryx gaesata (Meyrick, 1913)

Synonyms
- Inotica gaesata Meyrick, 1913

Species of moth

Stomopteryx gaesata is a moth of the family Gelechiidae. It was described by Edward Meyrick in 1913. It is found in the Taurus Mountains in Asia Minor. It has also been recorded from India.

The wingspan is about 27 mm. The forewings are pale whitish ochreous with the basal third of the costal edge dark fuscous. The veins are tinged with brownish, on the posterior half of the wing marked with lines of scattered dark fuscous scales, towards the apex and upper part of the termen enlarged and connected by some suffused dark fuscous sprinkles. There is a strong black streak along the fold from near the base to near the middle of the wing, and one in the disc from above the apex of this to three-fourths, these representing the stigmata. The hindwings are grey.
