= Stomopteryx argodoris =

Scientific classification
- Kingdom: Animalia
- Phylum: Arthropoda
- Class: Insecta
- Order: Lepidoptera
- Family: Gelechiidae
- Genus: Stomopteryx
- Species: S. argodoris

Binomial name
- Stomopteryx argodoris (Meyrick, 1936)

Synonyms
- Gelechia argodoris Meyrick, 1936

Species of moth

Stomopteryx argodoris is a moth of the family Gelechiidae. It was described by Edward Meyrick in 1936. It is found in China.
