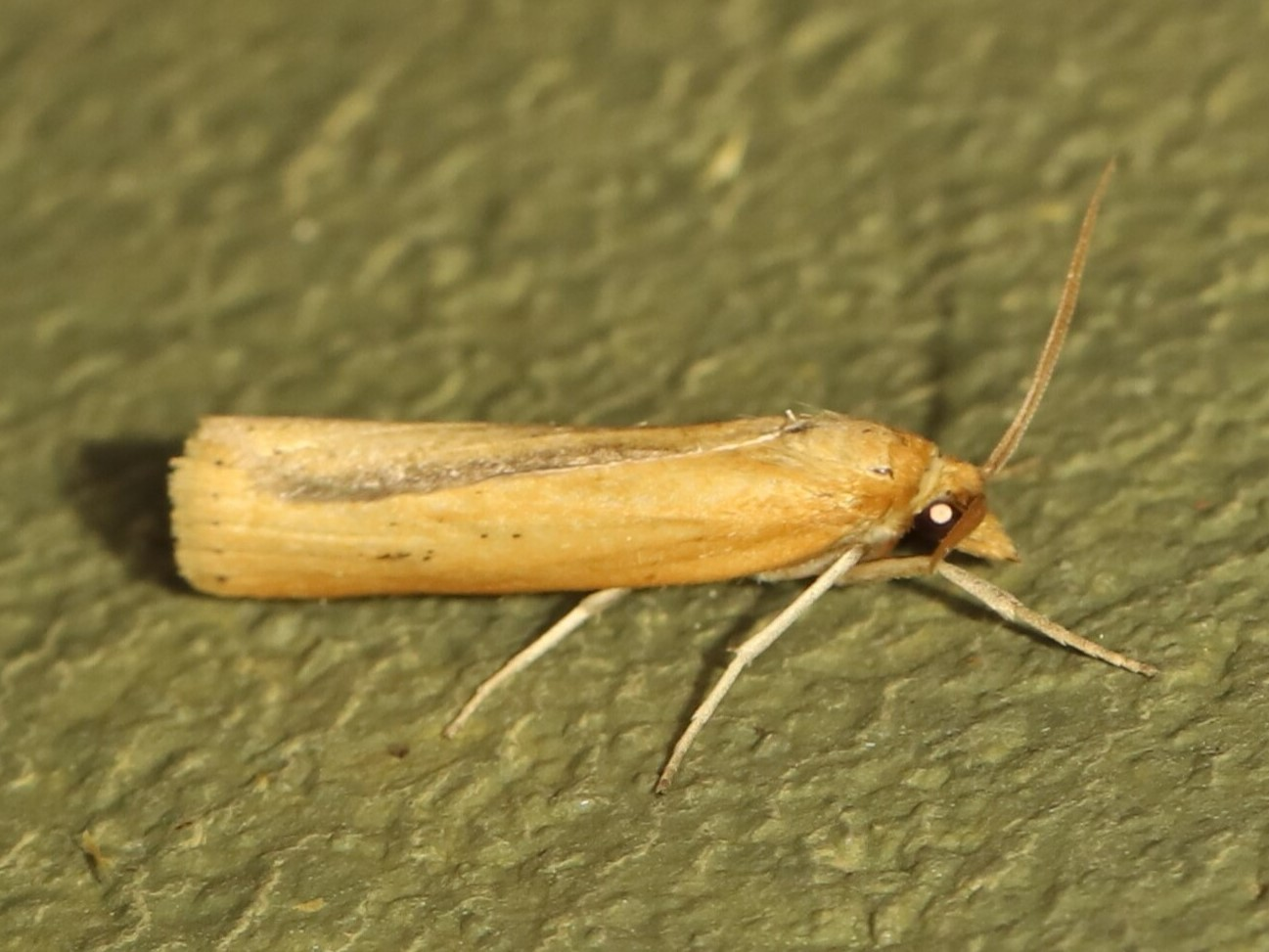

Scientific classification
- Kingdom: Animalia
- Phylum: Arthropoda
- Clade: Pancrustacea
- Class: Insecta
- Order: Lepidoptera
- Family: Crambidae
- Subfamily: Crambinae
- Tribe: Crambini
- Genus: Caffrocrambus
- Species: C. ochreus

Binomial name
- Caffrocrambus ochreus Błeszyński, 1970

= Caffrocrambus ochreus =

Species of moth

Caffrocrambus ochreus is a species of moth in the family Crambidae. It was described by Stanisław Błeszyński in 1970. It is found in East Africa (Kenya, Tanzania and Zimbabwe).
