= Pyncostola merista =

Scientific classification
- Kingdom: Animalia
- Phylum: Arthropoda
- Class: Insecta
- Order: Lepidoptera
- Family: Gelechiidae
- Genus: Pyncostola
- Species: P. merista

Binomial name
- Pyncostola merista Meyrick, 1918

Species of moth

Pyncostola merista is a moth of the family Gelechiidae. It was described by Edward Meyrick in 1918. It is found in South Africa, where it has been recorded from the Western Cape and Gauteng.

The wingspan is about 17 mm. The forewings are white, with scattered dark fuscous scales. The markings are formed by dark fuscous irroration (sprinkled) and there is a short mark from the costa near the base, and a spot on the base of the dorsum, as well as narrow irregular oblique fasciae at one-sixth and one-third. The plical stigma are visible as a darker mark on the second and the discal stigmata are represented by round spots at the middle and two-thirds, the first confluent with larger spots beyond it on the costa and the dorsum, the second confluent with a spot on the tornus. There is an irregular transverse spot across the wing towards the apex, more or less confluent with the tornal spot, and two small spots on the costa before and beyond this. The hindwings are light blue grey.
