= Stomopteryx grandidierella =

Scientific classification
- Kingdom: Animalia
- Phylum: Arthropoda
- Class: Insecta
- Order: Lepidoptera
- Family: Gelechiidae
- Genus: Stomopteryx
- Species: S. grandidierella

Binomial name
- Stomopteryx grandidierella (Viette, 1956)

Synonyms
- Acraeologa grandidierella Viette, 1956

Species of moth

Stomopteryx grandidierella is a moth of the family Gelechiidae. It was described by Pierre Viette in 1956. It is found in Madagascar.
