= Stomopteryx nugatricella =

Scientific classification
- Domain: Eukaryota
- Kingdom: Animalia
- Phylum: Arthropoda
- Class: Insecta
- Order: Lepidoptera
- Family: Gelechiidae
- Genus: Stomopteryx
- Species: S. nugatricella

Binomial name
- Stomopteryx nugatricella Rebel, 1893

Species of moth

Stomopteryx nugatricella is a moth of the family Gelechiidae. It was described by Hans Rebel in 1893. It is found in Spain.
