= Stomopteryx quadripunctella =

Scientific classification
- Kingdom: Animalia
- Phylum: Arthropoda
- Class: Insecta
- Order: Lepidoptera
- Family: Gelechiidae
- Genus: Stomopteryx
- Species: S. quadripunctella

Binomial name
- Stomopteryx quadripunctella Chrétien, 1915

Species of moth

Stomopteryx quadripunctella is a moth of the family Gelechiidae. It was described by Pierre Chrétien in 1915. It is found in Algeria.
