= Stomopteryx pallidella =

Scientific classification
- Domain: Eukaryota
- Kingdom: Animalia
- Phylum: Arthropoda
- Class: Insecta
- Order: Lepidoptera
- Family: Gelechiidae
- Genus: Stomopteryx
- Species: S. pallidella

Binomial name
- Stomopteryx pallidella Amsel, 1959

Species of moth

Stomopteryx pallidella is a moth of the family Gelechiidae. It was described by Hans Georg Amsel in 1959 and is found in Iran.
