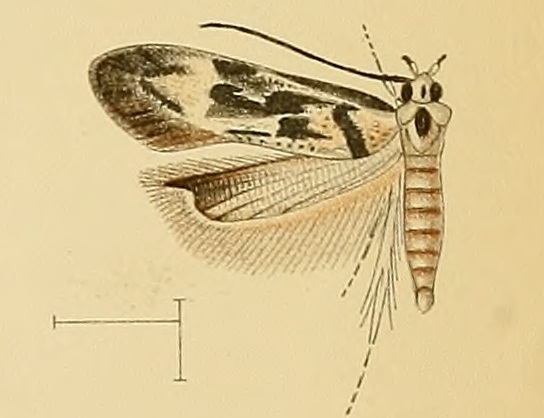

Scientific classification
- Domain: Eukaryota
- Kingdom: Animalia
- Phylum: Arthropoda
- Class: Insecta
- Order: Lepidoptera
- Family: Gelechiidae
- Genus: Stomopteryx
- Species: S. schizogynae

Binomial name
- Stomopteryx schizogynae (Walsingham, 1908)

Synonyms
- Telphusa schizogynae Walsingham, 1908

= Stomopteryx schizogynae =

Species of moth

Stomopteryx schizogynae is a moth of the family Gelechiidae. It is found on the Canary Islands.

The wingspan is 14–16 mm. The forewings are steely whitish, suffused with bluish grey to two thirds from the base. The hindwings are tawny grey.

The larvae have been recorded feeding within a gall on the stem of Schizogyne sericea.
