= Pyncostola actias =

Scientific classification
- Kingdom: Animalia
- Phylum: Arthropoda
- Class: Insecta
- Order: Lepidoptera
- Family: Gelechiidae
- Genus: Pyncostola
- Species: P. actias

Binomial name
- Pyncostola actias (Meyrick, 1904)

Synonyms
- Paltodora actias Meyrick, 1904

Species of moth

Pyncostola actias is a moth of the family Gelechiidae. It was described by Edward Meyrick in 1904. It is found in Australia, where it has been recorded from South Australia, Western Australia and Tasmania.

The wingspan is 10–11 mm (0.39–0.43 in). The forewings are light shining golden ochreous with a broad white costal streak from the base to the apex, the lower edge posteriorly suffused and more or less mixed with dark fuscous. There is a white dorsal suffused streak from the base to the tornus and sometimes some indistinct whitish streaks and dark fuscous scales towards the termen. The hindwings are pale grey.
