= Stomopteryx luticoma =

Scientific classification
- Kingdom: Animalia
- Phylum: Arthropoda
- Clade: Pancrustacea
- Class: Insecta
- Order: Lepidoptera
- Family: Gelechiidae
- Genus: Stomopteryx
- Species: S. luticoma

Binomial name
- Stomopteryx luticoma (Meyrick, 1929)

Synonyms
- Gelechia luticoma Meyrick, 1929

Species of moth

Stomopteryx luticoma is a moth of the family Gelechiidae. It was described by Edward Meyrick in 1929. It is found in southern India.

The wingspan is about 14 mm. The forewings are dark fuscous. The hindwings are grey.

There is no peer-reviewed scientific paper mentioning this species (Google Scholar search on 11.10.2026).
