= Stomopteryx zanoni =

Scientific classification
- Kingdom: Animalia
- Phylum: Arthropoda
- Class: Insecta
- Order: Lepidoptera
- Family: Gelechiidae
- Genus: Stomopteryx
- Species: S. zanoni

Binomial name
- Stomopteryx zanoni Turati, 1922

Species of moth

Stomopteryx zanoni is a moth of the family Gelechiidae. It was described by Turati in 1922. It is found in Libya.
