= Stomopteryx symplegadopa =

Scientific classification
- Kingdom: Animalia
- Phylum: Arthropoda
- Class: Insecta
- Order: Lepidoptera
- Family: Gelechiidae
- Genus: Stomopteryx
- Species: S. symplegadopa

Binomial name
- Stomopteryx symplegadopa Meyrick, 1936

Species of moth

Stomopteryx symplegadopa is a moth of the family Gelechiidae. It was described by Edward Meyrick in 1936. It is found in China.
