= Pyncostola auturga =

Scientific classification
- Kingdom: Animalia
- Phylum: Arthropoda
- Class: Insecta
- Order: Lepidoptera
- Family: Gelechiidae
- Genus: Pyncostola
- Species: P. auturga

Binomial name
- Pyncostola auturga Meyrick, 1921

Species of moth

Pyncostola auturga is a moth of the family Gelechiidae. It was described by Edward Meyrick in 1921. It is found in South Africa, where it has been recorded from KwaZulu-Natal, the Western Cape and Gauteng.

The wingspan is 19–20 mm. The forewings are brown, with the veins marked with lines of irroration (sprinkles) of dark fuscous scales with ochreous-whitish bases, and a streak of similar irroration along the costa from the base to three-fourths. There are suffused dark-fuscous dots beneath the costa at one-sixth and one-third. The stigmata are blackish, the discal approximated, the plical very obliquely before the first discal, an additional dot on the fold nearer the plical than the base. The hindwings are grey.
