= Stomopteryx tesserapunctella =

Scientific classification
- Domain: Eukaryota
- Kingdom: Animalia
- Phylum: Arthropoda
- Class: Insecta
- Order: Lepidoptera
- Family: Gelechiidae
- Genus: Stomopteryx
- Species: S. tesserapunctella

Binomial name
- Stomopteryx tesserapunctella (Amsel, 1935)

Synonyms
- Gelechia tesserapunctella Amsel, 1935

Species of moth

Stomopteryx tesserapunctella is a moth of the family Gelechiidae. It was described by Hans Georg Amsel in 1935. It is found in Palestine.
