= Schizovalva leontianella =

Scientific classification
- Domain: Eukaryota
- Kingdom: Animalia
- Phylum: Arthropoda
- Class: Insecta
- Order: Lepidoptera
- Family: Gelechiidae
- Genus: Schizovalva
- Species: S. leontianella

Binomial name
- Schizovalva leontianella Legrand, 1966

Species of moth

Schizovalva leontianella is a moth of the family Gelechiidae. It was described by Henry Legrand in 1966. It is found on the Seychelles, where it has been recorded from Mahé and Silhouette.

The larvae feed on Calophyllum inophyllum.
