= Stomopteryx deverrae =

Scientific classification
- Domain: Eukaryota
- Kingdom: Animalia
- Phylum: Arthropoda
- Class: Insecta
- Order: Lepidoptera
- Family: Gelechiidae
- Genus: Stomopteryx
- Species: S. deverrae

Binomial name
- Stomopteryx deverrae (Walsingham, 1905)

Synonyms
- Aproaerema deverrae Walsingham, 1905

Species of moth

Stomopteryx deverrae is a moth of the family Gelechiidae. It was described by Thomas de Grey, 6th Baron Walsingham, in 1905. It is found in Algeria and Spain.

The wingspan is about 13 mm. The forewings are yellow-ochreous at the base, with a narrow line of black scabs along the costa, another on the upper edge of the cell, below which the cell itself is pale whitish ochreous. From a little beyond, the remainder of the wing-surface is thickly suffused and speckled with black, the black scales being concentrated in an elongated spot on the middle of the wing, followed by a smaller one at the end of the cell, with some indication of a third in the fold below the first. The ground-colour underlying the black speckling is pale whitish ochreous, as on the upper half of the cell from the base, and is fairly conspicuous on the small patch at the commencement of the costal cilia and in another opposite to it on the dorsum. A line of black scales runs through the whitish ochreous cilia which are also dusted with black at their base. The hindwings are bluish-grey.

The larvae feed in the stems of Deverra scoparia.
