= Stomopteryx rastrifera =

Scientific classification
- Kingdom: Animalia
- Phylum: Arthropoda
- Class: Insecta
- Order: Lepidoptera
- Family: Gelechiidae
- Genus: Stomopteryx
- Species: S. rastrifera

Binomial name
- Stomopteryx rastrifera Meyrick, 1918

Species of moth

Stomopteryx rastrifera is a moth of the family Gelechiidae. It was described by Edward Meyrick in 1918. It is found in Sri Lanka.

The wingspan is about 7 mm. The forewings are brown, with the posterior half dark fuscous. There is a moderate evenly broad direct white fascia at two-thirds, with the anterior edge straight and the posterior irregular. The hindwings are grey.
