= Caffrocrambus decolorelloides =

Scientific classification
- Kingdom: Animalia
- Phylum: Arthropoda
- Clade: Pancrustacea
- Class: Insecta
- Order: Lepidoptera
- Family: Crambidae
- Subfamily: Crambinae
- Tribe: Crambini
- Genus: Caffrocrambus
- Species: C. decolorelloides

Binomial name
- Caffrocrambus decolorelloides Błeszyński, 1970

Species of moth

Caffrocrambus decolorelloides is a moth in the family Crambidae. It was described by Stanisław Błeszyński in 1970. It is found in Kenya and South Africa.
