= Stomopteryx elaeocoma =

Scientific classification
- Kingdom: Animalia
- Phylum: Arthropoda
- Class: Insecta
- Order: Lepidoptera
- Family: Gelechiidae
- Genus: Stomopteryx
- Species: S. elaeocoma

Binomial name
- Stomopteryx elaeocoma (Meyrick, 1918)

Synonyms
- Anacampsis elaeocoma Meyrick, 1918

Species of moth

Stomopteryx elaeocoma is a moth of the family Gelechiidae. It was described by Edward Meyrick in 1918. It is found in South Africa.

The wingspan is 11–12 mm. The forewings are dark fuscous finely sprinkled with whitish. The stigmata are blackish, the discal approximated, the plical obliquely before the first discal. The hindwings are light bluish grey.
