= Caffrocrambus dichotomellus =

Scientific classification
- Kingdom: Animalia
- Phylum: Arthropoda
- Clade: Pancrustacea
- Class: Insecta
- Order: Lepidoptera
- Family: Crambidae
- Genus: Caffrocrambus
- Species: C. dichotomellus

Binomial name
- Caffrocrambus dichotomellus (Hampson, 1919)

Synonyms
- Crambus dichotomellus Hampson, 1919

Species of moth

Caffrocrambus dichotomellus is a moth in the family Crambidae. It was described by George Hampson in 1919. It is found in South Africa, where it has been recorded from the Eastern Cape.
