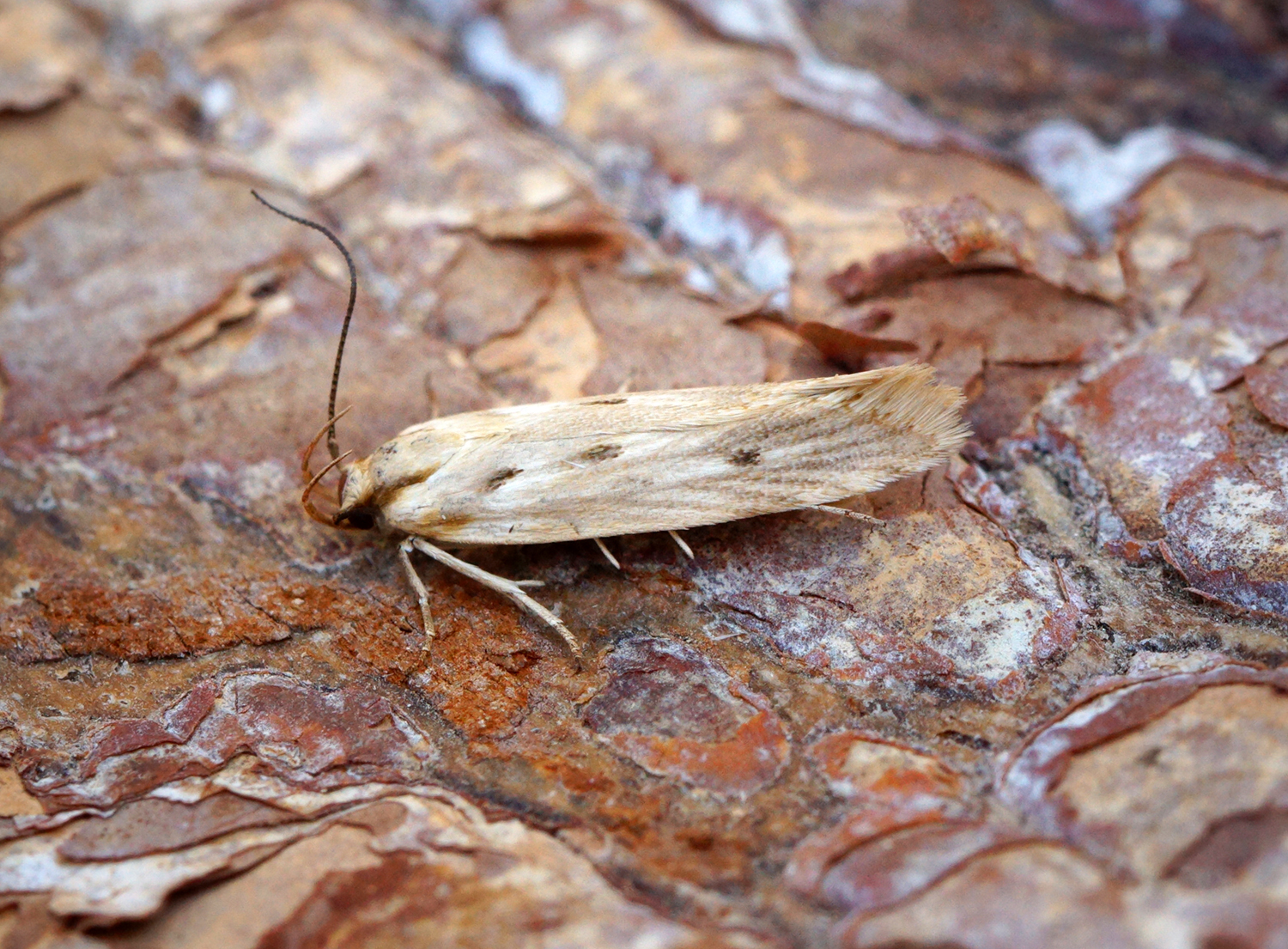

Scientific classification
- Kingdom: Animalia
- Phylum: Arthropoda
- Clade: Pancrustacea
- Class: Insecta
- Order: Lepidoptera
- Family: Gelechiidae
- Genus: Stomopteryx
- Species: S. detersella

Binomial name
- Stomopteryx detersella (Zeller, 1847)

Synonyms
- Gelechia detersella Zeller, 1847; Anacampsis egenella Herrich-Schäffer, 1851; Phthorimaea palermitella Laharpe, 1860; Stomopteryx obliteratella Turati, 1924; Bryotropha griseella Dufrane, 1955

= Stomopteryx detersella =

Species of moth

Stomopteryx detersella is a moth of the family Gelechiidae. It was described by Philipp Christoph Zeller in 1847. It is found in southern and eastern Europe, where it has been recorded from Portugal, Spain, France, Italy, Poland, Slovakia, Croatia, Albania, Bulgaria, Hungary, Romania, North Macedonia, Greece, Turkey, Russia and Ukraine, as well as on Sicily, Crete and the Canary Islands.

The wingspan is about 17 mm.

The larvae feed on Eryngium species. At first, the larvae mine the outer layers of the stem, but later bore the stem.
