= Pyncostola oeconomica =

Scientific classification
- Kingdom: Animalia
- Phylum: Arthropoda
- Class: Insecta
- Order: Lepidoptera
- Family: Gelechiidae
- Genus: Pyncostola
- Species: P. oeconomica

Binomial name
- Pyncostola oeconomica Meyrick, 1920

Species of moth

Pyncostola oeconomica is a moth of the family Gelechiidae. It was described by Edward Meyrick in 1920. It is found in South Africa, where it has been recorded from the Western Cape and KwaZulu-Natal.

The wingspan is 18–19 mm. The forewings are fuscous, suffused and irregularly mixed with whitish irroration (sprinkles), and more or less streaked with pale yellow ochreous in the disc. The stigmata are blackish, the discal approximated, the plical very obliquely before the first discal. The hindwings are grey.
