= Stomopteryx splendens =

Scientific classification
- Domain: Eukaryota
- Kingdom: Animalia
- Phylum: Arthropoda
- Class: Insecta
- Order: Lepidoptera
- Family: Gelechiidae
- Genus: Stomopteryx
- Species: S. splendens

Binomial name
- Stomopteryx splendens (Staudinger, 1881)

Synonyms
- Anacampsis splendens Staudinger, 1881

Species of moth

Stomopteryx splendens is a moth of the family Gelechiidae. It was described by Otto Staudinger in 1881. It is found in Asia Minor.

== Taxonomy ==
The species was originally described by Otto Staudinger in 1881, based on a specimen sent by Johann Manisadjian, collected in Amasya. He also identified specimens collected by Theobald Johannes Krüper on Mount Olympus as belonging to the same species. Staudinger had applied the name to another specimen in 1880, but without describing the species.

The species was transferred to Stormopteryx by Edward Meyrick in 1925. In 1957, László A. Gozmány re-examined Staudinger's specimens. He found that the 1880 specimen was a female which belonged to Stormopteryx, while the 1881 specimen from Johann, described as a male by Staudinger, was in fact a female Xystophora, and accordingly transferred A. splendens to that genus.

== Distribution ==
It occurs in Turkey (Asia Minor), and possibly also in Greece if Krüper's collections do belong to the species.
