= Pyncostola semnochroa =

Scientific classification
- Kingdom: Animalia
- Phylum: Arthropoda
- Class: Insecta
- Order: Lepidoptera
- Family: Gelechiidae
- Genus: Pyncostola
- Species: P. semnochroa

Binomial name
- Pyncostola semnochroa (Meyrick, 1913)

Synonyms
- Paltodora semnochroa Meyrick, 1913

Species of moth

Pyncostola semnochroa is a moth of the family Gelechiidae. It was described by Edward Meyrick in 1913. It is found in South Africa, where it has been recorded from Mpumalanga and KwaZulu-Natal.

The wingspan is 22–25 mm. The forewings are deep brown with the margins and veins marked with slender streaks of dark fuscous suffusion mixed with whitish. The hindwings are grey.
