= Stomopteryx kermella =

Scientific classification
- Domain: Eukaryota
- Kingdom: Animalia
- Phylum: Arthropoda
- Class: Insecta
- Order: Lepidoptera
- Family: Gelechiidae
- Genus: Stomopteryx
- Species: S. kermella

Binomial name
- Stomopteryx kermella Chrétien, 1915

Species of moth

Stomopteryx kermella is a moth of the family Gelechiidae. It was described by Pierre Chrétien in 1915. It is found in Algeria.
