= Stomopteryx mongolica =

Scientific classification
- Kingdom: Animalia
- Phylum: Arthropoda
- Clade: Pancrustacea
- Class: Insecta
- Order: Lepidoptera
- Family: Gelechiidae
- Genus: Stomopteryx
- Species: S. mongolica

Binomial name
- Stomopteryx mongolica Povolný, 1975

Synonyms
- Stomopteryx mongolica Piskunov, 1975

Species of moth

Stomopteryx mongolica is a moth of the family Gelechiidae. It was described by Povolný in 1975. It is found in Mongolia and the eastern part of European Russia.

The length of the forewings is 6–10 mm.
