= Pyncostola crateraula =

Scientific classification
- Kingdom: Animalia
- Phylum: Arthropoda
- Class: Insecta
- Order: Lepidoptera
- Family: Gelechiidae
- Genus: Pyncostola
- Species: P. crateraula

Binomial name
- Pyncostola crateraula Meyrick, 1918

Species of moth

Pyncostola crateraula is a moth of the family Gelechiidae. It was described by Edward Meyrick in 1918. It is found in South Africa, where it has been recorded from KwaZulu-Natal.

The wingspan measures approximately 27 mm. The forewings are whitish with the costa and veins suffused with blackish except on the dorsal area beneath the fold. There is some brown suffusion towards the base of the costa, above the end of the cell, and on a subterminal streak. There are large blackish dots suffused with brown beneath the costa at one-sixth and one-third. A short very fine black line runs along the fold towards the base and there is a blackish dot beneath the fold at one-fourth of the wing. The stigmata are blackish, the discal approximated, the plical very obliquely before the first discal. There is a slender blackish streak along the termen. The hindwings are grey.
