= Caffrocrambus chalcimerus =

Scientific classification
- Kingdom: Animalia
- Phylum: Arthropoda
- Clade: Pancrustacea
- Class: Insecta
- Order: Lepidoptera
- Family: Crambidae
- Subfamily: Crambinae
- Tribe: Crambini
- Genus: Caffrocrambus
- Species: C. chalcimerus

Binomial name
- Caffrocrambus chalcimerus (Hampson, 1919)

Synonyms
- Crambus chalcimerus Hampson, 1919

Species of moth

Caffrocrambus chalcimerus is a moth in the family Crambidae. It was described by George Hampson in 1919. It is found in Lesotho.
