= Schizovalva triplacopis =

Scientific classification
- Kingdom: Animalia
- Phylum: Arthropoda
- Class: Insecta
- Order: Lepidoptera
- Family: Gelechiidae
- Genus: Schizovalva
- Species: S. triplacopis

Binomial name
- Schizovalva triplacopis (Meyrick, 1912)

Synonyms
- Gelechia triplacopis Meyrick, 1912

Species of moth

Schizovalva triplacopis is a moth of the family Gelechiidae. It was described by Edward Meyrick in 1912. It is found in South Africa.

The wingspan is about 16 mm. The forewings are fuscous sprinkled with dark fuscous and somewhat mixed with ochreous whitish. There is a small dark fuscous spot beneath the costa near the base, followed by a spot of ochreous-whitish suffusion. The stigmata are rather large, blackish and edged posteriorly by spots of ochreous-whitish suffusion and anteriorly more or less with brown, the plical much before the first discal. There is a spot of ochreous-whitish suffusion on the costa at four-fifths. The hindwings are grey.
