= Stomopteryx plurivittella =

Scientific classification
- Domain: Eukaryota
- Kingdom: Animalia
- Phylum: Arthropoda
- Class: Insecta
- Order: Lepidoptera
- Family: Gelechiidae
- Genus: Stomopteryx
- Species: S. plurivittella

Binomial name
- Stomopteryx plurivittella (Turati, 1930)

Synonyms
- Kahelia plurivittella Turati, 1930

Species of moth

Stomopteryx plurivittella is a moth of the family Gelechiidae. It was described by Turati in 1930. It is found in Libya.
