= Stomopteryx tenuisignella =

Scientific classification
- Domain: Eukaryota
- Kingdom: Animalia
- Phylum: Arthropoda
- Class: Insecta
- Order: Lepidoptera
- Family: Gelechiidae
- Genus: Stomopteryx
- Species: S. tenuisignella

Binomial name
- Stomopteryx tenuisignella Turati, 1924

Species of moth

Stomopteryx tenuisignella is a moth of the family Gelechiidae. It was described by Turati in 1924. It is found in Libya.
