= Schizovalva sphenopis =

Scientific classification
- Kingdom: Animalia
- Phylum: Arthropoda
- Class: Insecta
- Order: Lepidoptera
- Family: Gelechiidae
- Genus: Schizovalva
- Species: S. sphenopis

Binomial name
- Schizovalva sphenopis (Meyrick, 1921)

Synonyms
- Acompsia sphenopis Meyrick, 1921

Species of moth

Schizovalva sphenopis is a moth of the family Gelechiidae. It was described by Edward Meyrick in 1921. It is found in Zimbabwe.

The wingspan is about 15 mm. The forewings are whitish grey, somewhat sprinkled with dark grey and blackish and with an elongate-triangular black spot in the disc before the middle, the apex directed posteriorly and edged with whitish. The second discal stigma is small, irregular, black and edged with whitish anteriorly. The hindwings are light grey.
