= Stomopteryx remissella =

Scientific classification
- Kingdom: Animalia
- Phylum: Arthropoda
- Clade: Pancrustacea
- Class: Insecta
- Order: Lepidoptera
- Family: Gelechiidae
- Genus: Stomopteryx
- Species: S. remissella

Binomial name
- Stomopteryx remissella (Zeller, 1847)

Synonyms
- Gelechia remissella Zeller, 1847; Anacampsis vetustella Herrich-Schäffer, 1855; Gelechia submissella Frey, 1880; Xystophora bicolorella Rebel, 1903; Aristotelia remissella rufobasella Rebel, 1916; Stomopteryx yunusemrei Koçak, 1986

Species of moth

Stomopteryx remissella is a moth of the family Gelechiidae. It was described by Philipp Christoph Zeller in 1847. It is found in most of Europe (except Ireland, Great Britain, the Benelux, Norway, Finland, the Baltic region and Ukraine).

The wingspan is 9–11 mm. Adults are on wing from June to July.
