= Caffrocrambus endoxantha =

Scientific classification
- Kingdom: Animalia
- Phylum: Arthropoda
- Clade: Pancrustacea
- Class: Insecta
- Order: Lepidoptera
- Family: Crambidae
- Genus: Caffrocrambus
- Species: C. endoxantha

Binomial name
- Caffrocrambus endoxantha (Hampson, 1919)

Synonyms
- Crambus endoxantha Hampson, 1919

Species of moth

Caffrocrambus endoxantha is a moth in the family Crambidae. It was described by George Hampson in 1919. It is found in Angola, Lesotho, South Africa and Zimbabwe.
