= Pyncostola stalactis =

Scientific classification
- Kingdom: Animalia
- Phylum: Arthropoda
- Class: Insecta
- Order: Lepidoptera
- Family: Gelechiidae
- Genus: Pyncostola
- Species: P. stalactis

Binomial name
- Pyncostola stalactis (Meyrick, 1904)

Synonyms
- Paltodora stalactis Meyrick, 1904

Species of moth

Pyncostola stalactis is a moth of the family Gelechiidae. It was described by Edward Meyrick in 1904. It is found in Australia, where it has been recorded from Western Australia and Tasmania.

The wingspan is 10–12 mm (0.39–0.47 in). The forewings are whitish, densely irrorated (sprinkled) with brown and with a cloudy blackish-fuscous dot beneath the costa at one-sixth, one on the fold beyond this, one towards the costa at one-third, one on the fold hardly beyond this, one in the middle of the disc, and one in the disc at two-thirds. The hindwings are pale grey.
