= Pyncostola ochraula =

Scientific classification
- Kingdom: Animalia
- Phylum: Arthropoda
- Class: Insecta
- Order: Lepidoptera
- Family: Gelechiidae
- Genus: Pyncostola
- Species: P. ochraula

Binomial name
- Pyncostola ochraula Meyrick, 1918

Species of moth

Pyncostola ochraula is a moth of the family Gelechiidae. It was described by Edward Meyrick in 1918. It is found in South Africa, where it has been recorded from Gauteng.

The wingspan is about 16 mm. The forewings are grey, suffusedly irrorated (sprinkled) with white and sprinkled with dark grey. There is a fulvous-ochreous subcostal line from near the base to two-fifths, with a blackish dot beneath its extremity and a fulvous-ochreous line is found along the fold throughout, marked with two black dots, the second being the plical stigma and the discal stigmata are black, approximated, the first very obliquely beyond the plical, surrounded or almost connected with fulvous ochreous. There are short fulvous-ochreous streaks above each of these, and a slender irregular fulvous-ochreous streak near and parallel to the termen. The hindwings are light bluish grey.
