= Stomopteryx bolschewickiella =

Scientific classification
- Domain: Eukaryota
- Kingdom: Animalia
- Phylum: Arthropoda
- Class: Insecta
- Order: Lepidoptera
- Family: Gelechiidae
- Genus: Stomopteryx
- Species: S. bolschewickiella

Binomial name
- Stomopteryx bolschewickiella (Caradja, 1920)

Synonyms
- Aristotelia bolschewickiella Caradja, 1920

Species of moth

Stomopteryx bolschewickiella is a moth of the family Gelechiidae. It was described by Aristide Caradja in 1920. It is found in Uralsk, Russia.
