= Pyncostola invida =

Scientific classification
- Kingdom: Animalia
- Phylum: Arthropoda
- Class: Insecta
- Order: Lepidoptera
- Family: Gelechiidae
- Genus: Pyncostola
- Species: P. invida

Binomial name
- Pyncostola invida (Meyrick, 1911)

Synonyms
- Paltodora invida Meyrick, 1911

Species of moth

Pyncostola invida is a moth of the family Gelechiidae. It was described by Edward Meyrick in 1911. It is found in South Africa, where it has been recorded from the Eastern Cape.

The wingspan is about 26 mm. The forewings are dark fuscous, slightly whitish sprinkled, streaked with ochreous brown between the veins in the disc. There is a slender black streak along the sub-median fold from near the base to the middle of the wing, edged above by a whitish streak. There is a slender black streak in the disc from the middle to near three-fourths, as well as a streak of blackish suffusion along the upper part of the termen to the apex. The hindwings are rather dark grey.
