= Schizovalva hyperythra =

Scientific classification
- Kingdom: Animalia
- Phylum: Arthropoda
- Class: Insecta
- Order: Lepidoptera
- Family: Gelechiidae
- Genus: Schizovalva
- Species: S. hyperythra

Binomial name
- Schizovalva hyperythra (Meyrick, 1921)

Synonyms
- Stomopteryx hyperythra Meyrick, 1921

Species of moth

Schizovalva hyperythra is a moth of the family Gelechiidae. It was described by Edward Meyrick in 1921. It is found in South Africa.

The wingspan is about 16 mm. The forewings are dark purplish fuscous. The stigmata are cloudy and obscurely darker, the plical obliquely before the first discal. The hindwings are grey, slightly bluish tinged.
