= Stomopteryx bathrarcha =

Scientific classification
- Kingdom: Animalia
- Phylum: Arthropoda
- Class: Insecta
- Order: Lepidoptera
- Family: Gelechiidae
- Genus: Stomopteryx
- Species: S. bathrarcha

Binomial name
- Stomopteryx bathrarcha Meyrick, 1921

Species of moth

Stomopteryx bathrarcha is a moth of the family Gelechiidae. It was described by Edward Meyrick in 1921. It is found in Zimbabwe.

The wingspan is 14–16 mm. The forewings are dark fuscous with a faint purplish tinge and with the extreme base pale ochreous, shortly produced along the dorsum. The plical and second discal stigmata are obscurely darker and there is a cloudy ochreous-whitish dot on the costa at three-fourths and one or two whitish scales on the tornus opposite. The hindwings are grey.
