= Schizovalva sarcographa =

Scientific classification
- Kingdom: Animalia
- Phylum: Arthropoda
- Class: Insecta
- Order: Lepidoptera
- Family: Gelechiidae
- Genus: Schizovalva
- Species: S. sarcographa

Binomial name
- Schizovalva sarcographa (Meyrick, 1917)

Synonyms
- Gelechia sarcographa Meyrick, 1917

Species of moth

Schizovalva sarcographa is a moth of the family Gelechiidae. It was described by Edward Meyrick in 1917. It is found in South Africa.

The wingspan is about 16 mm. The forewings are dark grey, somewhat mixed with pinkish towards the costa and a broad blackish streak from the base of the dorsum to fold at two-fifths of the wing, marked anteriorly with a pale ochreous dot, and cut posteriorly by an oblique pale ochreous mark which is continued by a similar dull rosy-pink mark to the costa at four-fifths. The hindwings are rather dark grey.
