= Schizovalva polygramma =

Scientific classification
- Kingdom: Animalia
- Phylum: Arthropoda
- Class: Insecta
- Order: Lepidoptera
- Family: Gelechiidae
- Genus: Schizovalva
- Species: S. polygramma

Binomial name
- Schizovalva polygramma (Meyrick, 1914)

Synonyms
- Gelechia polygramma Meyrick, 1914

Species of moth

Schizovalva polygramma is a moth of the family Gelechiidae. It was described by Edward Meyrick in 1914. It is found in South Africa.

The wingspan is 20–23 mm. The forewings are purplish fuscous mixed with dark fuscous and blackish. The costal edge and all the veins are marked with ochreous-whitish lines. The hindwings are light ochreous grey.
