= Schizovalva ochnias =

Scientific classification
- Kingdom: Animalia
- Phylum: Arthropoda
- Class: Insecta
- Order: Lepidoptera
- Family: Gelechiidae
- Genus: Schizovalva
- Species: S. ochnias

Binomial name
- Schizovalva ochnias (Meyrick, 1913)

Synonyms
- Gelechia ochnias Meyrick, 1913

Species of moth

Schizovalva ochnias is a moth of the family Gelechiidae. It was described by Edward Meyrick in 1913. It is found in South Africa.

The wingspan is 17–18 mm. The forewings are dark fuscous with a black streak along the basal fourth of the costa and a thick black streak on the fold from near the base to one-third, followed by some red-brownish suffusion. There is a rather elongate pointed black spot in the disc before the middle, and an irregular black spot beyond the middle, connected by some ochreous-white edging. An ochreous-whitish spot is found on the costa at four-fifths, where some very indistinct pale reddish-ochreous suffusion crosses the wing. The hindwings are grey.
