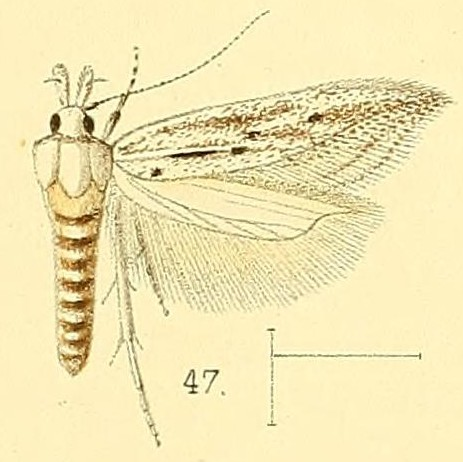
- Pyncostola suffusellus

Scientific classification
- Domain: Eukaryota
- Kingdom: Animalia
- Phylum: Arthropoda
- Class: Insecta
- Order: Lepidoptera
- Family: Gelechiidae
- Subfamily: Anomologinae
- Genus: Pyncostola; Meyrick, 1917

Synonyms
- Pycnostola Meyrick, 1918; Pynocstola Meyrick, 1918

= Pyncostola =

Genus of moths

Pyncostola is a genus of moths in the family Gelechiidae.

== Species ==
- Pyncostola abnormalis Janse, 1950
- Pyncostola actias (Meyrick, 1904)
- Pyncostola albicolorella Janse, 1950
- Pyncostola alloea Janse, 1960
- Pyncostola auturga Meyrick, 1921
- Pyncostola bohemiella (Nickerl, 1864)
- Pyncostola celeris Meyrick, 1920
- Pyncostola crateraula Meyrick, 1918
- Pyncostola dicksoni Janse, 1950
- Pyncostola flavostriga Janse, 1950
- Pyncostola fusca Janse, 1950
- Pyncostola fuscofascia Janse, 1950
- Pyncostola grandicornuta Bidzilya & Mey, 2011
- Pyncostola hiberna (Meyrick, 1912)
- Pyncostola illuminata (Meyrick, 1913)
- Pyncostola invida (Meyrick, 1911)
- Pyncostola iospila (Meyrick, 1909)
- Pyncostola lacteata Janse, 1950
- Pyncostola magnanima (Meyrick, 1912)
- Pyncostola melanatracta (Meyrick, 1910)
- Pyncostola merista Meyrick, 1918
- Pyncostola monophanes Janse, 1960
- Pyncostola nigrinotata Janse, 1950
- Pyncostola ochraula Meyrick, 1918
- Pyncostola oeconomica Meyrick, 1920
- Pyncostola operosa (Meyrick, 1909)
- Pyncostola pachyacma Meyrick, 1926
- Pyncostola pammacha (Meyrick, 1913)
- Pyncostola pentacentra (Meyrick, 1912)
- Pyncostola perlustrata Meyrick, 1920
- Pyncostola powelli Janse, 1950
- Pyncostola sciopola (Meyrick, 1904)
- Pyncostola semnochroa (Meyrick, 1913)
- Pyncostola stalactis (Meyrick, 1904)
- Pyncostola suffusellus (Walsingham, 1891)
- Pyncostola tanylopha Janse, 1960
- Pyncostola variegata Janse, 1950
- Pyncostola veronica Janse, 1950
- Pyncostola xanthomacula Janse, 1963
