= Stomopteryx lineolella =

Scientific classification
- Domain: Eukaryota
- Kingdom: Animalia
- Phylum: Arthropoda
- Class: Insecta
- Order: Lepidoptera
- Family: Gelechiidae
- Genus: Stomopteryx
- Species: S. lineolella

Binomial name
- Stomopteryx lineolella (Eversmann, 1844)

Synonyms
- Lita lineolella Eversmann, 1844

Species of moth

Stomopteryx lineolella is a moth of the family Gelechiidae. It was described by Eduard Friedrich Eversmann in 1844. It is found in eastern and southern European Russia.
