= Schizovalva blumenzweigella =

Scientific classification
- Domain: Eukaryota
- Kingdom: Animalia
- Phylum: Arthropoda
- Class: Insecta
- Order: Lepidoptera
- Family: Gelechiidae
- Genus: Schizovalva
- Species: S. blumenzweigella

Binomial name
- Schizovalva blumenzweigella Legrand, 1958

Species of moth

Schizovalva blumenzweigella is a moth of the family Gelechiidae. It was described by Henry Legrand in 1958. It is found on the Seychelles.
