= Pyncostola pentacentra =

Scientific classification
- Kingdom: Animalia
- Phylum: Arthropoda
- Class: Insecta
- Order: Lepidoptera
- Family: Gelechiidae
- Genus: Pyncostola
- Species: P. pentacentra

Binomial name
- Pyncostola pentacentra (Meyrick, 1912)

Synonyms
- Paltodora pentacentra Meyrick, 1912

Species of moth

Pyncostola pentacentra is a moth of the family Gelechiidae. It was described by Edward Meyrick in 1912. It is found in South Africa, where it has been recorded from KwaZulu-Natal.

The wingspan is about 20 mm. The forewings are whitish ochreous and the costa is slightly sprinkled with brownish specks. There are conspicuous black dots beneath the costa at one-sixth and one-third. The stigmata are black, the plical obliquely before the first discal. The hindwings are ochreous whitish.
