= Schizovalva mesacta =

Scientific classification
- Kingdom: Animalia
- Phylum: Arthropoda
- Class: Insecta
- Order: Lepidoptera
- Family: Gelechiidae
- Genus: Schizovalva
- Species: S. mesacta

Binomial name
- Schizovalva mesacta (Meyrick, 1909)

Synonyms
- Gelechia mesacta Meyrick, 1913

Species of moth

Schizovalva mesacta is a moth of the family Gelechiidae. It was described by Edward Meyrick in 1909. It is found in Gauteng, South Africa.

The wingspan is about 16 mm. The forewings are dark fuscous, suffused with reddish brown towards the dorsum and a short streak of blackish suffusion on the base of the dorsum and a blackish streak along the fold from near the base to beyond one-third. The discal stigmata are rather approximated, blackish and connected by red-brownish suffusion, beneath which adjacent to each is an additional less defined group of blackish scales. There is a narrow undefined slightly angulated red-brownish fascia at about three-fourths. The hindwings are light grey.
