= Stomopteryx biangulata =

Scientific classification
- Kingdom: Animalia
- Phylum: Arthropoda
- Class: Insecta
- Order: Lepidoptera
- Family: Gelechiidae
- Genus: Stomopteryx
- Species: S. biangulata

Binomial name
- Stomopteryx biangulata Meyrick, 1921

Species of moth

Stomopteryx biangulata is a moth of the family Gelechiidae. It was described by Edward Meyrick in 1921. It is found in Mozambique.

The wingspan is about 8 mm. The forewings are dark grey, the costal half of the wing from the base to two-thirds is largely suffused with ochreous whitish and the costa towards the base is narrowly suffused with dark fuscous. The stigmata are large and blackish, the plical rather obliquely before the first discal. There is a white oblique line, slightly sinuate, from the costa at three-fourths to near the middle of the termen, then acutely angulated inwards to the second discal stigma, and again acutely angulated to the tornus. The hindwings are grey.
