= Schizovalva matutina =

Scientific classification
- Kingdom: Animalia
- Phylum: Arthropoda
- Class: Insecta
- Order: Lepidoptera
- Family: Gelechiidae
- Genus: Schizovalva
- Species: S. matutina

Binomial name
- Schizovalva matutina (Meyrick, 1913)

Synonyms
- Gelechia matutina Meyrick, 1913

Species of moth

Schizovalva matutina is a moth from the family Gelechiidae. It was described by Edward Meyrick in 1913. It is found in South Africa. It has an approximate wingspan of15 mm. The forewings are blackish with a moderate pale rosy-ochreous streak from near the base along the dorsum and termen to near the apex, the upper edge irregular, triangularly indented about the tornus. The hindwings are pale grey, the apex darker.
