= Caffrocrambus homerus =

Scientific classification
- Kingdom: Animalia
- Phylum: Arthropoda
- Clade: Pancrustacea
- Class: Insecta
- Order: Lepidoptera
- Family: Crambidae
- Subfamily: Crambinae
- Tribe: Crambini
- Genus: Caffrocrambus
- Species: C. homerus

Binomial name
- Caffrocrambus homerus (Błeszyński, 1961)

Synonyms
- Anomocrambus homerus Błeszyński, 1961

Species of moth

Caffrocrambus homerus is a moth in the family Crambidae. It was described by Stanisław Błeszyński in 1961. It is found in South Africa, where it has been recorded from KwaZulu-Natal.
