= Pyncostola sciopola =

Scientific classification
- Kingdom: Animalia
- Phylum: Arthropoda
- Class: Insecta
- Order: Lepidoptera
- Family: Gelechiidae
- Genus: Pyncostola
- Species: P. sciopola

Binomial name
- Pyncostola sciopola (Meyrick, 1904)

Synonyms
- Paltodora sciopola Meyrick, 1904

Species of moth

Pyncostola sciopola is a moth of the family Gelechiidae. It was described by Edward Meyrick in 1904. It is found in Australia, where it has been recorded from New South Wales.

The wingspan is about 11 mm (0.43 in). The forewings are grey, irrorated (sprinkled) with dark fuscous. The plical and second discal stigmata are black. The hindwings are light grey.
