= Pyncostola celeris =

Scientific classification
- Kingdom: Animalia
- Phylum: Arthropoda
- Class: Insecta
- Order: Lepidoptera
- Family: Gelechiidae
- Genus: Pyncostola
- Species: P. celeris

Binomial name
- Pyncostola celeris Meyrick, 1920

Species of moth

Pyncostola celeris is a moth of the family Gelechiidae. It was described by Edward Meyrick in 1920. It is found in South Africa, where it has been recorded from the Western Cape.

The wingspan is 20–22 mm. The male forewings are whitish, while those of the females are pale yellow ochreous, more or less speckled irregularly with fuscous, especially along the margins. The stigmata are small, indistinct and ferruginous brownish, with the discal approximated, the plical very obliquely before the first discal. The hindwings are pale whitish grey.
