= Pyncostola bohemiella =

Scientific classification
- Domain: Eukaryota
- Kingdom: Animalia
- Phylum: Arthropoda
- Class: Insecta
- Order: Lepidoptera
- Family: Gelechiidae
- Genus: Pyncostola
- Species: P. bohemiella

Binomial name
- Pyncostola bohemiella (Nickerl, 1864)

Synonyms
- Cleodora bohemiella Nickerl, 1864; Paltodora bohemiella var. tunesiella Chrétien, 1915; Megacraspedus jablonkayi Gozmány, 1954

Species of moth

Pyncostola bohemiella is a moth of the family Gelechiidae. It is found from central and southern Europe to the Ural Mountains. It is also found in North Africa, where it has been recorded from Tunisia.

The forewings are yellow and the hindwings are grey. Adults have been recorded on wing from May to June.

The larvae have been recorded feeding on the roots of Achillea millefolium.
