= Pyncostola illuminata =

Scientific classification
- Kingdom: Animalia
- Phylum: Arthropoda
- Class: Insecta
- Order: Lepidoptera
- Family: Gelechiidae
- Genus: Pyncostola
- Species: P. illuminata

Binomial name
- Pyncostola illuminata (Meyrick, 1913)

Synonyms
- Paltodora illuminata Meyrick, 1913

Species of moth

Pyncostola illuminata is a moth of the family Gelechiidae. It was described by Edward Meyrick in 1913. It is found in South Africa, where it has been recorded from Mpumalanga, KwaZulu-Natal, Gauteng and Limpopo.

The wingspan is 18–21 mm. The forewings are light brownish ochreous, all veins marked with pale greyish-ochreous streaks irrorated (sprinkled) with dark fuscous. There are dark fuscous dots between these streaks beneath the costa at one-fifth and one-third, one on the fold between these, and three representing the stigmata, the plical very obliquely before the first discal. The hindwings are pale ochreous grey.
