= Stomopteryx phaeopa =

Scientific classification
- Kingdom: Animalia
- Phylum: Arthropoda
- Class: Insecta
- Order: Lepidoptera
- Family: Gelechiidae
- Genus: Stomopteryx
- Species: S. phaeopa

Binomial name
- Stomopteryx phaeopa Meyrick, 1918

Species of moth

Stomopteryx phaeopa is a moth of the family Gelechiidae. It was described by Edward Meyrick in 1918. It is found in Peru.

The wingspan is 9–11 mm. The forewings are dark slaty fuscous, slightly pale speckled. The stigmata are blackish, with the plical accompanied by small whitish-ochreous dot, obliquely before the first discal, the discal partially edged with a few whitish-ochreous scales, the first sometimes nearly obsolete. There is a small whitish-ochreous cloudy spot on the costa at two-thirds. The hindwings are grey.
