= Pyncostola operosa =

Scientific classification
- Kingdom: Animalia
- Phylum: Arthropoda
- Class: Insecta
- Order: Lepidoptera
- Family: Gelechiidae
- Genus: Pyncostola
- Species: P. operosa

Binomial name
- Pyncostola operosa (Meyrick, 1909)

Synonyms
- Paltodora operosa Meyrick, 1909

Species of moth

Pyncostola operosa is a moth of the family Gelechiidae. It was described by Edward Meyrick in 1909. It is found in South Africa, where it has been recorded from KwaZulu-Natal and Gauteng.

The wingspan is 18–22 mm. The forewings are brown, irrorated (speckled) on the margins and veins with dark fuscous and whitish, but this irroration sometimes extends over most of the wing, except longitudinal streaks in the disk and along the fold, sometimes tinged with yellowish. The stigmata are represented by small suffused dark fuscous spots, the plical very obliquely before the first discal. Similar spots are found near the base in the middle, beneath the costa at one-sixth and one-third, and on the fold between these. The hindwings are grey.
