= Caffrocrambus decolorellus =

Scientific classification
- Kingdom: Animalia
- Phylum: Arthropoda
- Clade: Pancrustacea
- Class: Insecta
- Order: Lepidoptera
- Family: Crambidae
- Subfamily: Crambinae
- Tribe: Crambini
- Genus: Caffrocrambus
- Species: C. decolorellus

Binomial name
- Caffrocrambus decolorellus (Walker, 1863)

Synonyms
- Crambus decolorellus Walker, 1863

Species of moth

Caffrocrambus decolorellus is a moth in the family Crambidae. It was described by Francis Walker in 1863. It is found in South Africa.
