= Stomopteryx multilineatella =

Scientific classification
- Domain: Eukaryota
- Kingdom: Animalia
- Phylum: Arthropoda
- Class: Insecta
- Order: Lepidoptera
- Family: Gelechiidae
- Genus: Stomopteryx
- Species: S. multilineatella

Binomial name
- Stomopteryx multilineatella (D. Lucas, 1932)

Synonyms
- Symmoca multilineatella D. Lucas, 1932

Species of moth

Stomopteryx multilineatella is a moth of the family Gelechiidae. It was described by Daniel Lucas in 1932. It is found in Morocco.
