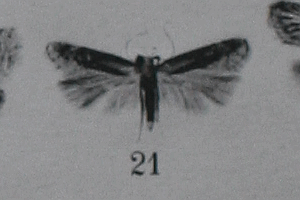

Scientific classification
- Domain: Eukaryota
- Kingdom: Animalia
- Phylum: Arthropoda
- Class: Insecta
- Order: Lepidoptera
- Family: Gelechiidae
- Genus: Stomopteryx
- Species: S. flavoclavella

Binomial name
- Stomopteryx flavoclavella Zerny, 1935

= Stomopteryx flavoclavella =

Species of moth

Stomopteryx flavoclavella is a moth of the family Gelechiidae. It was described by Zerny in 1935. It is found in Morocco and Spain.
