= Pyncostola perlustrata =

Scientific classification
- Kingdom: Animalia
- Phylum: Arthropoda
- Class: Insecta
- Order: Lepidoptera
- Family: Gelechiidae
- Genus: Pyncostola
- Species: P. perlustrata

Binomial name
- Pyncostola perlustrata Meyrick, 1920

Species of moth

Pyncostola perlustrata is a moth of the family Gelechiidae. It was described by Edward Meyrick in 1920. It is found in South Africa, where it has been recorded from the Western Cape.

The wingspan is 14–16 mm. The forewings are fulvous ochreous, the veins and margins streaked with light grey sprinkled with dark fuscous and with an indistinct dark fuscous dot beneath the costa towards the base. The stigmata are indistinct and dark fuscous, the plical very obliquely before the first discal. The hindwings are light grey.
