= Caffrocrambus husserli =

Scientific classification
- Kingdom: Animalia
- Phylum: Arthropoda
- Clade: Pancrustacea
- Class: Insecta
- Order: Lepidoptera
- Family: Crambidae
- Subfamily: Crambinae
- Tribe: Crambini
- Genus: Caffrocrambus
- Species: C. husserli

Binomial name
- Caffrocrambus husserli Bassi, 2002

Species of moth

Caffrocrambus husserli is a moth in the family Crambidae. It was described by Graziano Bassi in 2002. It is found in Lesotho.
