= Stomopteryx maledicta =

Scientific classification
- Kingdom: Animalia
- Phylum: Arthropoda
- Class: Insecta
- Order: Lepidoptera
- Family: Gelechiidae
- Genus: Stomopteryx
- Species: S. maledicta

Binomial name
- Stomopteryx maledicta Meyrick, 1921

Species of moth

Stomopteryx maledicta is a moth of the family Gelechiidae. It was described by Edward Meyrick in 1921. It is found on Java in Indonesia.

The wingspan is about 9 mm. The forewings are dark grey speckled with grey whitish throughout. The plical stigma is cloudy, obscurely darker, sometimes preceded and followed by slight whitish suffusion. The hindwings are grey.
