= Stomopteryx sphenodoxa =

Scientific classification
- Kingdom: Animalia
- Phylum: Arthropoda
- Class: Insecta
- Order: Lepidoptera
- Family: Gelechiidae
- Genus: Stomopteryx
- Species: S. sphenodoxa

Binomial name
- Stomopteryx sphenodoxa Meyrick, 1931

Species of moth

Stomopteryx sphenodoxa is a moth of the family Gelechiidae. It was described by Edward Meyrick in 1931. It is found in India.

The larvae feed on Crotalaria species. They mine the leaves of their host plant.
