= Stomopteryx thoracica =

Scientific classification
- Kingdom: Animalia
- Phylum: Arthropoda
- Clade: Pancrustacea
- Class: Insecta
- Order: Lepidoptera
- Family: Gelechiidae
- Genus: Stomopteryx
- Species: S. thoracica

Binomial name
- Stomopteryx thoracica (Meyrick, 1911)

Synonyms
- Anacampsis thoracica Meyrick, 1911

Species of moth

Stomopteryx thoracica is a moth of the family Gelechiidae. It was described by Edward Meyrick in 1911. It is found in South Africa.

The wingspan is 16–19 mm. The forewings are dark grey, finely sprinkled with whitish grey and with a small yellow-ochreous basal patch, not reaching the costa, edged with blackish dots in the middle and on the dorsum. The plical and second discal stigmata are blackish. The hindwings are grey.
