= Schizovalva peronectis =

Scientific classification
- Kingdom: Animalia
- Phylum: Arthropoda
- Class: Insecta
- Order: Lepidoptera
- Family: Gelechiidae
- Genus: Schizovalva
- Species: S. peronectis

Binomial name
- Schizovalva peronectis (Meyrick, 1909)

Synonyms
- Gelechia peronectis Meyrick, 1913

Species of moth

Schizovalva peronectis is a moth of the family Gelechiidae. It was described by Edward Meyrick in 1909. It is found in South Africa.

The wingspan is about 26 mm. The forewings are fuscous, sprinkled with dark fuscous and towards the dorsum with whitish. There are some black and whitish scales on vein 12 and a thick black medium longitudinal streak from the base to the end of the cell, obliquely interrupted before the middle of the wing, both sections edged posteriorly with white. There are streaks of blackish scales on veins 5 and 6, and some scattered blackish scales on the other veins posteriorly. The hindwings are grey.
