= Stomopteryx subnigricella =

Scientific classification
- Domain: Eukaryota
- Kingdom: Animalia
- Phylum: Arthropoda
- Class: Insecta
- Order: Lepidoptera
- Family: Gelechiidae
- Genus: Stomopteryx
- Species: S. subnigricella

Binomial name
- Stomopteryx subnigricella (Dufrane, 1955)

Synonyms
- Bryotropha subnigricella Dufrane, 1955

Species of moth

Stomopteryx subnigricella is a moth of the family Gelechiidae. It is found in southern Tunisia.
