= Pyncostola magnanima =

Scientific classification
- Kingdom: Animalia
- Phylum: Arthropoda
- Class: Insecta
- Order: Lepidoptera
- Family: Gelechiidae
- Genus: Pyncostola
- Species: P. magnanima

Binomial name
- Pyncostola magnanima (Meyrick, 1912)

Synonyms
- Paltodora magnanima Meyrick, 1912

Species of moth

Pyncostola magnanima is a moth of the family Gelechiidae. It was described by Edward Meyrick in 1912. It is found in South Africa, where it was recorded from what was then the Orange Free State.

The wingspan is 27–28 mm. The forewings are pale brownish ochreous mixed with white and more or less irrorated (sprinkled) with dark fuscous, the veins sometimes partially streaked with white. There are cloudy dark fuscous dots beneath the costa near the base and at one-sixth and two cloudy dark fuscous dots on the fold obliquely beyond these, connected by a fine dark fuscous streak with the plical stigma, this streak edged above with white. The stigmata are dark fuscous, the plical much before the first discal, the first discal elongate, the second dot-like. The hindwings are grey.
