= Schizovalva catharodes =

Scientific classification
- Kingdom: Animalia
- Phylum: Arthropoda
- Class: Insecta
- Order: Lepidoptera
- Family: Gelechiidae
- Genus: Schizovalva
- Species: S. catharodes

Binomial name
- Schizovalva catharodes (Meyrick, 1920)

Synonyms
- Gelechia catharodes Meyrick, 1920

Species of moth

Schizovalva catharodes is a moth of the family Gelechiidae. It was described by Edward Meyrick in 1920. It is found in South Africa.

The wingspan is about 22 mm. The forewings are ochreous white, irregularly sprinkled with black, mostly towards the margins. There is an irregular blackish transverse subbasal streak, shortly extended along the dorsum. The stigmata are represented by small irregular spots of dense black sprinkles, the plical beneath the first discal and touching it, the second discal larger and transverse, reaching to near the dorsum. The hindwings are whitish grey.
