= Stomopteryx geryella =

Scientific classification
- Domain: Eukaryota
- Kingdom: Animalia
- Phylum: Arthropoda
- Class: Insecta
- Order: Lepidoptera
- Family: Gelechiidae
- Genus: Stomopteryx
- Species: S. geryella

Binomial name
- Stomopteryx geryella (Chrétien, 1915)

Synonyms
- Anacampsis geryella Chrétien, 1915

Species of moth

Stomopteryx geryella is a moth of the family Gelechiidae. It was described by Pierre Chrétien in 1915. It is found in North Africa.
