= Stomopteryx maraschella =

Scientific classification
- Domain: Eukaryota
- Kingdom: Animalia
- Phylum: Arthropoda
- Class: Insecta
- Order: Lepidoptera
- Family: Gelechiidae
- Genus: Stomopteryx
- Species: S. maraschella

Binomial name
- Stomopteryx maraschella (Caradja, 1920)

Synonyms
- Anacampsis maraschella Caradja, 1920

Species of moth

Stomopteryx maraschella is a moth of the family Gelechiidae. It was described by Aristide Caradja in 1920. It is found in southern Turkey.
