= Schizovalva stasiarcha =

Scientific classification
- Kingdom: Animalia
- Phylum: Arthropoda
- Class: Insecta
- Order: Lepidoptera
- Family: Gelechiidae
- Genus: Schizovalva
- Species: S. stasiarcha

Binomial name
- Schizovalva stasiarcha (Meyrick, 1913)

Synonyms
- Gelechia stasiarcha Meyrick, 1913

Species of moth

Schizovalva stasiarcha is a moth of the family Gelechiidae. It was described by Edward Meyrick in 1913. It is found in South Africa.

The wingspan is 15–16 mm. The forewings are shining white with a broad dark purplish-fuscous median longitudinal band from the base to the apex. The hindwings are grey whitish or grey.
