= Caffrocrambus democritus =

Scientific classification
- Kingdom: Animalia
- Phylum: Arthropoda
- Clade: Pancrustacea
- Class: Insecta
- Order: Lepidoptera
- Family: Crambidae
- Genus: Caffrocrambus
- Species: C. democritus

Binomial name
- Caffrocrambus democritus Bassi, 1994

Species of moth

Caffrocrambus democritus is a moth in the family Crambidae. It was described by Graziano Bassi in 1994. It is found in the Democratic Republic of the Congo.
