= Stomopteryx orthogonella =

Scientific classification
- Domain: Eukaryota
- Kingdom: Animalia
- Phylum: Arthropoda
- Class: Insecta
- Order: Lepidoptera
- Family: Gelechiidae
- Genus: Stomopteryx
- Species: S. orthogonella

Binomial name
- Stomopteryx orthogonella (Staudinger, 1871)

Synonyms
- Gelechia orthogonella Staudinger, 1871; Doryphora orthogonella

Species of moth

Stomopteryx orthogonella is a moth of the family Gelechiidae. It was described by Otto Staudinger in 1871. It is found in central and southern European Russia and Ukraine.
