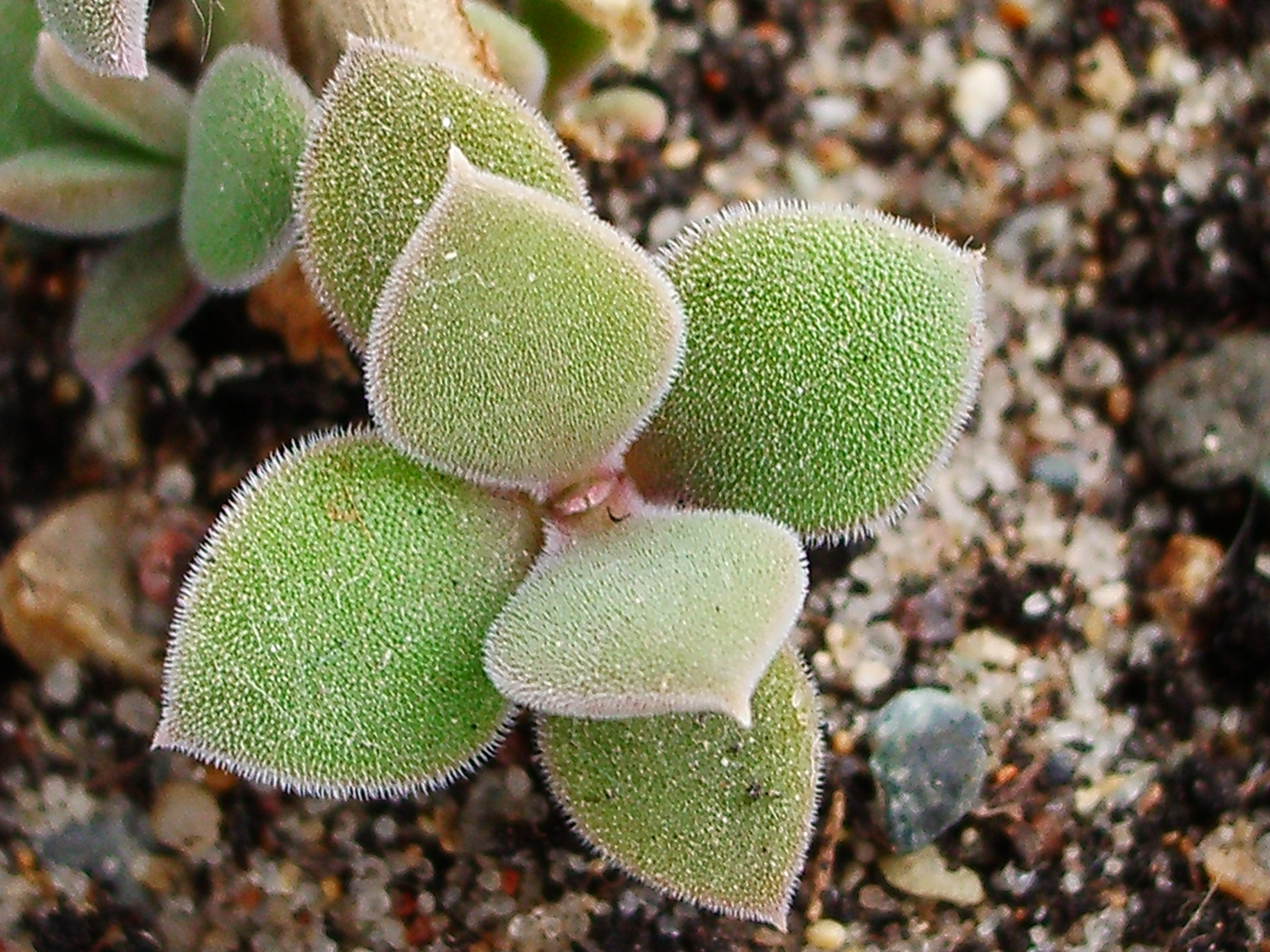

Scientific classification
- Kingdom: Plantae
- Clade: Tracheophytes
- Clade: Angiosperms
- Clade: Eudicots
- Order: Caryophyllales
- Family: Aizoaceae
- Genus: Delosperma
- Species: D. jansei

Binomial name
- Delosperma jansei N.E.Br.

Synonyms
- Delosperma denticulatum L.Bolus

= Delosperma jansei =

Species of flowering plant

Delosperma jansei, commonly known as the Janse's ice plant, is a perennial succulent belonging to the Aizoaceae family. The species is endemic to KwaZulu-Natal and Mpumalanga.
