= Nuwe Smitsdorp =

Coordinates: 24.123°S 29.328°E

Nuwe Smitsdorp is a settlement in the Limpopo province of South Africa.

Originally it was established by gold diggers on 21 November 1887 as Smitsdorp, after General Nicolaas Smit. However, because there was little water, it was moved two kilometers away and renamed Nuwe Smitsdorp (New Smitsdorp). As gold deposits in the area turned out to be very small, the gold rush soon petered out, especially after large deposits of gold were found on the Witwatersrand in 1885.
