= Anthonie Johannes Theodorus Janse =

Dutch entomologist (1877–1970)

Dr Anthonie Johannes Theodorus Janse
- Born: 19 April 1877
- Died: 12 June 1970 (aged 93); Pretoria, South Africa
- Scientific career
- Fields: Entomology

Dr Anthonie Johannes Theodorus Janse, also known as Antonius Johannes Theodorus Janse and by other orthographic variations (19 April 1877 – 12 June 1970), was a pioneer of South African entomology who specialised in Lepidoptera. His multi-volumed work, The Moths of South Africa is recognized as a definitive text.

== Life and career ==
Janse was born in the Hague, Netherlands in 1877 to Antonie Johannes Janse and his wife Willemina Broekhuisen. He migrated to South Africa in 1889 and taught as a missionary in schools in northern Transvaal Waterval (Nuwe Smitsdorp). He was interned at Pinetown during the Second Boer War. He worked as a photographer in Pietersburg. He taught biology, geography, and human physiology at Normal College, Pretoria, from 1905 until his retirement in 1937. He was in charge of the Normal College Herbarium.

Initially, he worked under primitive conditions, collecting on foot or by donkey cart. He was widely respected as an authority on South African moths and was a botanist, collecting alongside Reino Leendertz. In 1921-1922, he visited Europe and worked in museums in London, Leiden and Berlin, comparing and identifying many hundreds of specimens he collected. In acknowledgement of his work, he was presented in London with the Joicey collection of Pyralidae, which he brought back with him to Pretoria.

He lectured at Pretoria University College for many years and was made an honorary professor in Systematic Entomology there in 1923. In 1925, the University of South Africa awarded him an honoris causa degree as Doctor of Science.

== Curatorial work ==
Once retired Janse worked as an entomologist at Transvaal Museum. He collected in excess of 100,000 specimens which were added to the museum's collection and further completed his multi-volume work entitled The Moths of South Africa (1932-1964), which is a definitive text. In 1945, the government of South Africa purchased his collection, equipment and library and placed it in the care of the Transvaal Museum, where he himself was appointed Honorary Curator of Heterocera. Due to lack of space, his collection remained at his house, where his laboratory was. The museum's collection of Heterocera moved there instead, thus merging the two collections.

== Awards and honors ==
Janse was a founding member of the South African Biological society where he was awarded the Senior Captain Scott Medal in 1922 and was elected five times president. He was a founder of the Entomological Association of South Africa. He was honoured with a medal in 1948 by The South African Association for the Advancement of Science. He was a fellow of the Royal Entomological Society, and an honorary member of the Nederlandse Entomologische Vereniging.

Janse published over forty papers and eight volumes of The Moths of South Africa. He discovered over five hundred new species and prepared detailed drawings of the external structure and genitalia of both sexes.

He continued his research with his involvement with Transvaal Museum, and made three extensive collecting trips by car and trailer, despite being over 75. His wife accompanied him as his assistant. He continued his research until a year before his death when he suffered from a serious illness.

Many species of moth are named after him as well as one plant, Delosperma jansei.
