= List of moths of South Africa (Gelechiidae) =

This is a list of moths of the family Gelechiidae that are found in South Africa. It also acts as an index to the species articles and forms part of the full List of moths of South Africa.

- Acraeologa delotypa Janse, 1963
- Acraeologa xanthobasalis Janse, 1963
- Acraeologa xerochroa Meyrick, 1921
- Acribologa cymotrocha (Meyrick, 1913)
- Acutitornus kalahariensis Janse, 1957
- Acutitornus leucostola Janse, 1957
- Acutitornus liebbergi Janse, 1963
- Acutitornus munda Janse, 1951
- Acutitornus munroi Janse, 1957
- Aeolotrocha delograpta Janse, 1960
- Aeolotrocha generosa Meyrick, 1921
- Aeolotrocha paroptila Janse, 1960
- Aeolotrocha phaeoptera Janse, 1960
- Allophlebia hemizancla Janse, 1960
- Amblyphylla lophozancla Janse, 1960
- Anacampsis cosmia Meyrick, 1921
- Anacampsis embrocha Meyrick, 1914
- Anapatetris crystallista (Meyrick, 1911)
- Anarsia agricola Walsingham, 1891
- Anarsia albibasella Janse, 1963
- Anarsia amalleuta Meyrick, 1913
- Anarsia antisaris (Meyrick, 1913)
- Anarsia callicosma Janse, 1960
- Anarsia carbonaria Meyrick, 1913
- Anarsia gravata Meyrick, 1911
- Anarsia inculta Walsingham, 1891
- Anarsia mitescens Meyrick, 1913
- Anarsia nigrimacula Janse, 1949
- Anarsia nimbosa Meyrick, 1913
- Anarsia permissa Meyrick, 1926
- Anarsia pustulata Janse, 1949
- Anarsia sciograpta (Meyrick, 1921)
- Anarsia sciotona Meyrick, 1927
- Anarsia spicata Meyrick, 1918
- Anarsia subfulvescens Meyrick, 1918
- Anarsia vectaria Meyrick, 1918
- Anastomopteryx angulata Janse, 1951
- Angustiphylla hylotropa Janse, 1960
- Anomologa demens Meyrick, 1926
- Anomologa dispulsa Meyrick, 1926
- Aproaerema africanella (Janse, 1951)
- Araeophalla barbertonensis Janse, 1960
- Araeovalva albiflora (Meyrick, 1920)
- Araeovalva minor Janse, 1960
- Argophara epaxia Janse, 1963
- Aristotelia balanocentra Meyrick, 1914
- Aristotelia chlorographa Meyrick, 1914
- Aristotelia comis Meyrick, 1913
- Aristotelia dryonota Meyrick, 1926
- Aristotelia galeotis Meyrick, 1908
- Aristotelia ptilastis Meyrick, 1909
- Aristotelia swierstrai Janse, 1950
- Aristotelia trematias Meyrick, 1913
- Asapharcha strigifera Meyrick, 1920
- Aspades armatovalva Janse, 1963
- Aspades hutchinsonella (Walsingham, 1891)
- Athrips cretulata Meyrick, 1927
- Athrips helicaula (Meyrick, 1912)
- Athrips mappigera Meyrick, 1914
- Athrips neograpta Meyrick, 1914
- Athrips phoenaula (Meyrick, 1913)
- Athrips ptychophora (Meyrick, 1914)
- Athrips syncopaula (Meyrick, 1937)
- Athrips zetterstedtiella (Zeller, 1852)
- Autodectis atelarga Meyrick, 1937
- Belovalva nigripuncta Janse, 1963
- Bilobata argosticha (Janse, 1954)
- Bilobata subsecivella (Zeller, 1852)
- Bilobata torninotella (Janse, 1954)
- Blastovalva anisochroa Janse, 1960
- Blastovalva haplotypa Janse, 1960
- Blastovalva paltobola (Meyrick, 1921)
- Brachmia apricata Meyrick, 1913
- Brachmia convolvuli Walsingham, 1907
- Brachmia fiscinata Meyrick, 1918
- Brachmia fuscogramma Janse, 1960
- Brachmia graphicodes Meyrick, 1914
- Brachmia malacogramma Meyrick, 1909
- Brachmia musicopa Meyrick, 1908
- Brachmia pantheropa Meyrick, 1913
- Brachmia septella (Zeller, 1852)
- Brachmia spilopis Meyrick, 1927
- Brachmia velitaris Meyrick, 1913
- Brachmia verberata Meyrick, 1911
- Bucolarcha geodes Meyrick, 1929
- Calliphylla retusa Janse, 1963
- Capnosema celidota Janse, 1958
- Catelaphris torrefacta (Meyrick, 1914)
- Cerofrontia griseotincta Janse, 1951
- Chrysoesthia isocharis (Vári, 1963)
- Chrysoesthia mimetis (Vári, 1963)
- Chrysoesthia stipelloides (Janse, 1950)
- Clepsimorpha inconspicua Janse, 1960
- Cymatoplicella aestuosa (Meyrick, 1913)
- Cymatoplicella aplectodes (Janse, 1960)
- Dactylethrella chionitis (Meyrick, 1910)
- Dactylethrella siccifolii (Walsingham, 1881)
- Dactylethrella tetrametra (Meyrick, 1913)
- Daemonarcha amblopis Janse, 1954
- Daemonarcha atactodes Janse, 1954
- Daemonarcha cyprophanes Meyrick, 1918
- Daemonarcha hamata Janse, 1954
- Daemonarcha heterobela Janse, 1954
- Daemonarcha oncera Janse, 1954
- Deltolophos haplopa Janse, 1960
- Deltophora diversella Sattler, 1979
- Deltophora typica Sattler, 1979
- Dichomeris antizyga Meyrick, 1913
- Dichomeris argentaria Meyrick, 1913
- Dichomeris basistriata (Walsingham, 1897)
- Dichomeris cotifera Meyrick, 1913
- Dichomeris exsecta Meyrick, 1927
- Dichomeris fruitans Meyrick, 1920
- Dichomeris impigra Meyrick, 1913
- Dichomeris meridionella (Walsingham, 1891)
- Dichomeris metrodes Meyrick, 1913
- Dichomeris oleata Meyrick, 1913
- Dichomeris stasimopa Meyrick, 1937
- Dichomeris stromatias Meyrick, 1918
- Dichomeris ventosa Meyrick, 1913
- Dichomeris xanthodeta Meyrick, 1913
- Dicranucha albicincta (Meyrick, 1921)
- Dicranucha dicksoni Janse, 1963
- Dicranucha homochroma Janse, 1954
- Dicranucha ochrostoma (Meyrick, 1913)
- Dicranucha serialis (Meyrick, 1908)
- Dicranucha sterictis (Meyrick, 1908)
- Dicranucha strepsigramma (Meyrick, 1937)
- Encentrotis catagrapha Meyrick, 1921
- Encolpotis argyrophanes Meyrick, 1937
- Encolpotis xanthoria Meyrick, 1909
- Ephysteris aellographa Janse, 1960
- Ephysteris fuscocrossa Janse, 1960
- Ephysteris infirma (Meyrick, 1912)
- Ephysteris neosirota (Janse, 1950)
- Ephysteris ornata (Janse, 1950)
- Ephysteris parasynecta Janse, 1963
- Ephysteris promptella (Staudinger, 1859)
- Ephysteris sirota (Meyrick, 1908)
- Eporgastis conclusa (Meyrick, 1918)
- Ereboscaeas amorpha Meyrick, 1937
- Erikssonella permagna (Meyrick, 1920)
- Euryctista hobohmi Janse, 1963
- Filisignella cirrhaea (Meyrick, 1914)
- Flexiptera revoluta (Meyrick, 1918)
- Frumenta nephelomicta Meyrick, 1930
- Furcaphora caelata (Meyrick, 1913)
- Gambrostola imposita Meyrick, 1926
- Gelechia abjunctella Walker, 1864
- Gelechia aglossella Walker, 1866
- Gelechia anagramma Meyrick, 1921
- Gelechia arotrias Meyrick, 1908
- Gelechia chionomima Meyrick, 1929
- Gelechia epiphloea Meyrick, 1913
- Gelechia fecunda Meyrick, 1918
- Gelechia flavipalpella Walsingham, 1881
- Gelechia liberata Meyrick, 1910
- Gelechia omphalopis Meyrick, 1926
- Gelechia rescissella Zeller, 1852
- Gelechia resecta Meyrick, 1913
- Gelechia sematica (Meyrick, 1913)
- Gelechia tetraleuca Meyrick, 1918
- Gnosimacha catericta Meyrick, 1927
- Grandipalpa robusta Janse, 1951
- Haplovalva ametris (Meyrick, 1921)
- Hedma maculata Povolný, 1978
- Hedma microcasis (Meyrick, 1929)
- Hedma rhamnifoliae (Amsel & Hering, 1931)
- Holaxyra acuta (Meyrick, 1927)
- Holaxyra ithyaula (Meyrick, 1926)
- Holaxyra picrophanes (Meyrick, 1913)
- Hypatima albogrisea (Walsingham, 1881)
- Hypatima austerodes (Meyrick, 1918)
- Hypatima binummulata (Meyrick, 1929)
- Hypatima dissidens (Meyrick, 1913)
- Hypatima formidolosa (Meyrick, 1916)
- Hypatima improba (Meyrick, 1913)
- Hypatima lecticata (Meyrick, 1926)
- Hypatima loxosaris (Meyrick, 1918)
- Hypatima mancipata (Meyrick, 1913)
- Hypatima melanecta (Meyrick, 1914)
- Hypatima nigrogrisea Janse, 1949
- Hypatima probolaea (Meyrick, 1913)
- Hypatima solutrix (Meyrick, 1911)
- Hypatima stasimodes (Meyrick, 1931)
- Hypatima tetraptila (Meyrick, 1909)
- Hypatima triannulata (Meyrick, 1911)
- Iochares festa Meyrick, 1921
- Iochares straminis (Walsingham, 1881)
- Ischnocraspedus peracuta (Meyrick, 1920)
- Ischnophylla similicolor Janse, 1963
- Lacharissa tanyzancla Meyrick, 1937
- Lachnostola amphizeucta Meyrick, 1918
- Lacistodes brunneostola Janse, 1960
- Lacistodes tauropis Meyrick, 1921
- Lanceopenna pentastigma Janse, 1960
- Lanceopenna prominula (Meyrick, 1913)
- Lanceopenna pseudogaleotis Janse, 1950
- Lanceoptera panochra Janse, 1960
- Lasiarchis hirsuta Janse, 1958
- Lasiarchis pycnodes (Meyrick, 1909)
- Leucophylla nigribasis Janse, 1960
- Leuronoma chlorotoma Meyrick, 1918
- Leuronoma eodryas (Meyrick, 1918)
- Leuronoma magna Janse, 1958
- Leuronoma nigridorsis Meyrick, 1921
- Leuronoma textifera (Meyrick, 1913)
- Leuronoma veterascens Meyrick, 1918
- Leuronoma zymotis (Meyrick, 1909)
- Leuropalpa reducta (Janse, 1951)
- Machlotricha griseostola Janse, 1960
- Machlotricha latipalpis (Walsingham, 1881)
- Macrocalcara sporima Janse, 1960
- Megacraspedus serica Meyrick, 1909
- Melitoxoides cophias (Meyrick, 1913)
- Melitoxoides glauca Janse, 1960
- Melitoxoides leucodoxa (Meyrick, 1920)
- Melitoxoides panaula (Meyrick, 1909)
- Metatactis griseobrunnea Janse, 1949
- Metzneria acrena (Meyrick, 1908)
- Metzneria heptacentra Meyrick, 1911
- Microcraspedus brachypogon (Meyrick, 1937)
- Microcraspedus eremaula (Janse, 1960)
- Microcraspedus photinopa (Meyrick, 1925)
- Microcraspedus synecta (Meyrick, 1909)
- Mometa zemiodes Durrant, 1914
- Musurga turgida (Meyrick, 1918)
- Neopachnistis amblystola Janse, 1954
- Neopachnistis parochroma Janse, 1954
- Neopachnistis pseudomorpha Janse, 1954
- Neopachnistis tephrodes (Meyrick, 1909)
- Neopatetris tenuis Janse, 1960
- Neotelphusa anisogrisea Janse, 1958
- Neotelphusa bimaculata Janse, 1958
- Neotelphusa castrigera (Meyrick, 1913)
- Neotelphusa cirrhomacula Janse, 1958
- Neotelphusa craterota (Meyrick, 1913)
- Neotelphusa ferrugilinea Janse, 1958
- Neotelphusa flavinotatta Janse, 1958
- Neotelphusa fuscisparsa Janse, 1958
- Neotelphusa limenaea (Meyrick, 1920)
- Neotelphusa obliquifascia Janse, 1960
- Neotelphusa ochrophthalma (Meyrick, 1927)
- Neotelphusa pallidistola Janse, 1958
- Neotelphusa phaeomacula Janse, 1958
- Neotelphusa similella Janse, 1958
- Neotelphusa tapinota Janse, 1958
- Ochrodia pentamacula (Janse, 1958)
- Ochrodia subdiminutella (Stainton, 1867)
- Octonodula inumbrata (Meyrick, 1914)
- Onebala brunneotincta Janse, 1954
- Onebala obsoleta Janse, 1954
- Onebala probolaspis Meyrick, 1929
- Onebala semiluna Janse, 1954
- Onebala zulu (Walsingham, 1881)
- Ornativalva kalahariensis (Janse, 1960)
- Panicotricha prographa Meyrick, 1913
- Parabola butyraula (Meyrick, 1913)
- Parabrachmia anomala Janse, 1960
- Parabrachmia trisignella Janse, 1960
- Parallactis panchlora (Meyrick, 1911)
- Parallactis plaesiodes (Meyrick, 1920)
- Parallactis zorophanes Janse, 1954
- Parapsectris carinata (Meyrick, 1911)
- Parapsectris exstincta (Meyrick, 1911)
- Parapsectris fastidiosa Meyrick, 1911
- Parapsectris ferax (Meyrick, 1913)
- Parapsectris feraxoides Bidzilya, 2010
- Parapsectris ferulata Meyrick, 1918
- Parapsectris lacunosa (Meyrick, 1918)
- Parapsectris ochrocosma (Meyrick, 1911)
- Parapsectris opaula (Meyrick, 1911)
- Parapsectris tholaea Meyrick, 1911
- Paraselotis pelochroa Janse, 1960
- Paratelphusa griseoptera Janse, 1958
- Parathectis farinata (Meyrick, 1913)
- Parathectis sordidula (Meyrick, 1913)
- Paristhmia barathrodes Meyrick, 1909
- Pectinophora gossypiella (Saunders, 1844)
- Phanerophalla knysnaensis Janse, 1960
- Photodotis abachausi Janse, 1958
- Photodotis pellochroa Janse, 1960
- Photodotis prochalina Meyrick, 1911
- Photodotis spilodoma Meyrick, 1918
- Phthoracma blanda Meyrick, 1921
- Phthorimaea operculella (Zeller, 1873)
- Picroptera aulotoma (Meyrick, 1917)
- Picroptera orthacma (Meyrick, 1926)
- Pithanurga chariphila Meyrick, 1921
- Platyphalla ochrinotata Janse, 1951
- Polyhymno blastophora Janse, 1950
- Polyhymno centrophora (Meyrick, 1921)
- Polyhymno chionarcha Meyrick, 1913
- Polyhymno deuteraula Meyrick, 1914
- Polyhymno erratica Janse, 1950
- Polyhymno eurydoxa Meyrick, 1909
- Polyhymno furcatella Janse, 1950
- Polyhymno hieracitis Meyrick, 1913
- Polyhymno hostilis Meyrick, 1918
- Polyhymno inermis Meyrick, 1913
- Polyhymno intorta Meyrick, 1918
- Polyhymno intortoides Janse, 1950
- Polyhymno lignicolor Janse, 1950
- Polyhymno multifida Meyrick, 1917
- Polyhymno oxystola Meyrick, 1913
- Polyhymno palinorsa Meyrick, 1909
- Polyhymno paracma Meyrick, 1909
- Polyhymno pausimacha Meyrick, 1909
- Polyhymno pernitida Janse, 1950
- Polyhymno pleuracma Meyrick, 1926
- Polyhymno tetragrapha Meyrick, 1913
- Polyhymno thinoclasta Meyrick, 1926
- Polyhymno tropaea Meyrick, 1908
- Polyhymno walsinghami Janse, 1950
- Proselotis strictula (Meyrick, 1937)
- Pseudotelphusa albisignata Janse, 1960
- Pseudotelphusa albopasta Janse, 1960
- Pseudotelphusa confixa (Meyrick, 1918)
- Pseudotelphusa cycota (Meyrick, 1911)
- Pseudotelphusa devia (Meyrick, 1913)
- Pseudotelphusa griseotincta Janse, 1958
- Pseudotelphusa oxychasta (Meyrick, 1929)
- Pseudotelphusa paracycota Janse, 1958
- Pseudotelphusa probata (Meyrick, 1909)
- Pseudotelphusa tornimacula Janse, 1958
- Pseudotelphusa trinephela (Meyrick, 1929)
- Ptychovalva obruta (Meyrick, 1921)
- Ptychovalva trigella (Zeller, 1852)
- Ptychovalva trimaculata Janse, 1960
- Pycnodytis erebaula Meyrick, 1918
- Pyncostola abnormalis Janse, 1950
- Pyncostola albicolorella Janse, 1950
- Pyncostola alloea Janse, 1950
- Pyncostola auturga Meyrick, 1921
- Pyncostola celeris Meyrick, 1920
- Pyncostola crateraula Meyrick, 1918
- Pyncostola dicksoni Janse, 1956
- Pyncostola flavostriga Janse, 1950
- Pyncostola fusca Janse, 1950
- Pyncostola fuscofasciata Janse, 1950
- Pyncostola hiberna (Meyrick, 1912)
- Pyncostola illuminata (Meyrick, 1913)
- Pyncostola invida (Meyrick, 1911)
- Pyncostola iospila (Meyrick, 1909)
- Pyncostola lacteata Janse, 1950
- Pyncostola magnanima (Meyrick, 1912)
- Pyncostola melanatracta (Meyrick, 1910)
- Pyncostola merista Meyrick, 1918
- Pyncostola monophanes Janse, 1960
- Pyncostola nigrinotata Janse, 1950
- Pyncostola ochraula Meyrick, 1918
- Pyncostola oeconomica Meyrick, 1920
- Pyncostola operosa (Meyrick, 1909)
- Pyncostola pachyacma Meyrick, 1926
- Pyncostola pammacha (Meyrick, 1913)
- Pyncostola pentacentra (Meyrick, 1912)
- Pyncostola perlustrata Meyrick, 1920
- Pyncostola powelli Janse, 1950
- Pyncostola semnochroa (Meyrick, 1913)
- Pyncostola suffusellus (Walsingham, 1891)
- Pyncostola tanylopha Janse, 1960
- Pyncostola variegata Janse, 1950
- Pyncostola veronica Janse, 1950
- Pyncostola xanthomacula Janse, 1963
- Rotundivalva blanda Janse, 1951
- Schematistis analoxa Meyrick, 1911
- Schistovalva trachyptera Janse, 1960
- Schizovalva ablepta Janse, 1960
- Schizovalva adelosema Janse, 1960
- Schizovalva alaopis (Meyrick, 1921)
- Schizovalva anisofascia Janse, 1960
- Schizovalva bistrigata Janse, 1951
- Schizovalva brunneotincta Janse, 1951
- Schizovalva brunneovesta Janse, 1960
- Schizovalva catharodes (Meyrick, 1920)
- Schizovalva celidota Janse, 1960
- Schizovalva cyrtogramma Janse, 1960
- Schizovalva ebenostriga Janse, 1960
- Schizovalva epicentra (Meyrick, 1909)
- Schizovalva episema Janse, 1960
- Schizovalva exoenota Meyrick, 1918
- Schizovalva exsulata (Meyrick, 1918)
- Schizovalva guillarmodi Janse, 1960
- Schizovalva hyperythra (Meyrick, 1921)
- Schizovalva isochorda (Meyrick, 1921)
- Schizovalva isophanes Janse, 1960
- Schizovalva leptochroa Janse, 1960
- Schizovalva leucogrisea Janse, 1951
- Schizovalva matutina (Meyrick, 1913)
- Schizovalva mesacta (Meyrick, 1909)
- Schizovalva naufraga (Meyrick, 1911)
- Schizovalva nigrifasciata Janse, 1951
- Schizovalva nigrosema Janse, 1960
- Schizovalva nubila Janse, 1960
- Schizovalva ochnias (Meyrick, 1913)
- Schizovalva ochrotincta Janse, 1951
- Schizovalva ophitis (Meyrick, 1913)
- Schizovalva perirrorata Janse, 1951
- Schizovalva peronectis (Meyrick, 1909)
- Schizovalva polygramma (Meyrick, 1914)
- Schizovalva prioleuca (Meyrick, 1911)
- Schizovalva rhodochra (Meyrick, 1913)
- Schizovalva rubigitincta Janse, 1951
- Schizovalva sarcographa (Meyrick, 1917)
- Schizovalva stasiarcha (Meyrick, 1913)
- Schizovalva trachypalpella Janse, 1960
- Schizovalva triplacopis (Meyrick, 1912)
- Schizovalva trisignis (Meyrick, 1908)
- Schizovalva unitincta Janse, 1960
- Schizovalva xerochroa Janse, 1951
- Schizovalva xylotincta Janse, 1951
- Scrobipalpa aptatella (Walker, 1864)
- Scrobipalpa chersophila (Meyrick, 1909)
- Scrobipalpa colasta (Meyrick, 1921)
- Scrobipalpa concreta (Meyrick, 1914)
- Scrobipalpa costimacula Janse, 1960
- Scrobipalpa cretigena (Meyrick, 1914)
- Scrobipalpa dispensata (Meyrick, 1921)
- Scrobipalpa ergasima (Meyrick, 1916)
- Scrobipalpa geomicta (Meyrick, 1918)
- Scrobipalpa incola (Meyrick, 1912)
- Scrobipalpa nomias (Meyrick, 1921)
- Scrobipalpa obsoletella (Fischer von Röslerstamm, 1841)
- Scrobipalpa ocyphanes (Meyrick, 1937)
- Scrobipalpa pendens (Meyrick, 1918)
- Scrobipalpa phalacrodes (Meyrick, 1913)
- Scrobipalpa phelotris (Meyrick, 1909)
- Scrobipalpa triloba Janse, 1960
- Scrobipalpa trychnophylla Janse, 1960
- Scrobipalpa vicaria (Meyrick, 1921)
- Scrobipalpa xylochroa Janse, 1963
- Sitotroga cerealella (Olivier, 1789)
- Sitotroga psacasta (Meyrick, 1908)
- Sophronia aquilex Meyrick, 1926
- Stegasta variana Meyrick, 1904
- Stomopteryx anxia (Meyrick, 1917)
- Stomopteryx circaea (Meyrick, 1911)
- Stomopteryx cirrhocoma (Meyrick, 1914)
- Stomopteryx credula (Meyrick, 1927)
- Stomopteryx difficilis Janse, 1951
- Stomopteryx elaeocoma (Meyrick, 1918)
- Stomopteryx eremopis (Meyrick, 1921)
- Stomopteryx frivola Meyrick, 1926
- Stomopteryx officiosa Janse, 1951
- Stomopteryx oncodes (Meyrick, 1913)
- Stomopteryx pallidipes Janse, 1951
- Stomopteryx thoracica (Meyrick, 1911)
- Stomopteryx trachyphylla Janse, 1960
- Strenophila hyptiota Meyrick, 1913
- Symbatica cryphias Meyrick, 1910
- Syncopacma consimilis Janse, 1951
- Syncopacma lutea Janse, 1960
- Syncopacma monochromella Janse, 1951
- Syncopacma oxyspila (Meyrick, 1909)
- Syncopacma perfuscata Janse, 1951
- Syncopacma polychromella (Rebel, 1902)
- Syngelechia psimythota (Meyrick, 1913)
- Syrmadaula automorpha Meyrick, 1918
- Telphusa amphichroma Meyrick, 1913
- Telphusa calathaea Meyrick, 1913
- Telphusa iosticta Meyrick, 1937
- Telphusa iriditis Meyrick, 1920
- Telphusa retecta Meyrick, 1921
- Thaumaturgis craterocrossa Meyrick, 1934
- Thiotricha tenuis (Walsingham, 1891)
- Thriophora ovulata Meyrick, 1911
- Thymosopha antileuca Meyrick, 1914
- Trichotaphe amblychroa Janse, 1954
- Trichotaphe byrsoxantha Meyrick, 1918
- Trichotaphe claviculata Meyrick, 1909
- Trichotaphe coenulenta (Meyrick, 1927)
- Trichotaphe condylotes Meyrick, 1921
- Trichotaphe dysnotata Janse, 1954
- Trichotaphe excepta (Meyrick, 1914)
- Trichotaphe externella (Zeller, 1852)
- Trichotaphe famosa Meyrick, 1914
- Trichotaphe furvellus (Zeller, 1852)
- Trichotaphe hortulana Meyrick, 1918
- Trichotaphe inclusa (Meyrick, 1927)
- Trichotaphe introspiciens Meyrick, 1926
- Trichotaphe ironica Meyrick, 1909
- Trichotaphe ligyra Meyrick, 1913
- Trichotaphe molybdea Janse, 1954
- Trichotaphe ochroxesta Meyrick, 1921
- Trichotaphe oenombra Meyrick, 1914
- Trichotaphe opsorrhoa Meyrick, 1929
- Trichotaphe oxygrapha Meyrick, 1913
- Trichotaphe physeta Meyrick, 1913
- Trichotaphe pleuropa Meyrick, 1921
- Trichotaphe plumbosa Meyrick, 1913
- Trichotaphe pyrrhitis Meyrick, 1911
- Trichotaphe quadrifurcata Janse, 1954
- Trichotaphe rubidula Meyrick, 1913
- Trichotaphe skukuzae Janse, 1954
- Trichotaphe subiridescens Janse, 1954
- Trichotaphe tapinostola Janse, 1954
- Trichotaphe tridentata Janse, 1954
- Tricyanaula metallica (Walsingham, 1891)
- Trychnopalpa fornacaria (Meyrick, 1913)
- Zalithia deltophora Janse, 1954
- Zalithia octophora (Meyrick, 1918)
- Zalithia xanthophylla Janse, 1963
