= Photodotis palens =

Scientific classification
- Domain: Eukaryota
- Kingdom: Animalia
- Phylum: Arthropoda
- Class: Insecta
- Order: Lepidoptera
- Family: Gelechiidae
- Genus: Photodotis
- Species: P. palens

Binomial name
- Photodotis palens Omelko, 1993

Species of moth

Photodotis palens is a moth of the family Gelechiidae. It was described by Omelko in 1993. It is found in the Russian Far East (Primorsky Krai), Korea and Japan.

The wingspan is about 11 mm.
