= Khoisa epicentra =

Scientific classification
- Kingdom: Animalia
- Phylum: Arthropoda
- Class: Insecta
- Order: Lepidoptera
- Family: Gelechiidae
- Genus: Khoisa
- Species: K. epicentra

Binomial name
- Khoisa epicentra (Meyrick, 1909)

Synonyms
- Gelechia epicentra Meyrick, 1909

Species of moth

Khoisa epicentra is a moth in the family Gelechiidae. It was described by Edward Meyrick in 1909. It is found in South Africa.

The wingspan is about 16 mm. The forewings are light yellow ochreous irregularly sprinkled with fuscous and with a small fuscous spot in the disc at one-sixth. The stigmata are black, with the plical obliquely before the first discal, beyond which is an additional black dot in the middle of the disc, these three connected by a patch of fuscous suffusion, the second discal less defined, preceded by an additional undefined dark fuscous dot obliquely above it. There is a transverse patch of fuscous suffusion from the costa at two-thirds, reaching halfway across the wing and a series of blackish-fuscous dots around the posterior third of the costa and termen. The hindwings are pale grey.
