= Encolpotis =

Scientific classification
- Domain: Eukaryota
- Kingdom: Animalia
- Phylum: Arthropoda
- Class: Insecta
- Order: Lepidoptera
- Family: Gelechiidae
- Subfamily: Gelechiinae
- Genus: Encolpotis; Meyrick, 1909

Genus of moths

Encolpotis is a genus of moths in the family Gelechiidae.

== Species ==
- Encolpotis heliopepta Meyrick, 1918
- Encolpotis scioplasta Meyrick, 1920
- Encolpotis xanthoria Meyrick, 1909
