= Lasiarchis =

Scientific classification
- Domain: Eukaryota
- Kingdom: Animalia
- Phylum: Arthropoda
- Class: Insecta
- Order: Lepidoptera
- Family: Gelechiidae
- Subfamily: Gelechiinae
- Genus: Lasiarchis; Meyrick, 1937

Genus of moths

Lasiarchis is a genus of moths in the family Gelechiidae.

== Species ==
- Lasiarchis hirsuta Janse, 1958
- Lasiarchis pycnodes (Meyrick, 1909)
