= Macrocalcara undina =

Scientific classification
- Domain: Eukaryota
- Kingdom: Animalia
- Phylum: Arthropoda
- Class: Insecta
- Order: Lepidoptera
- Family: Gelechiidae
- Genus: Macrocalcara
- Species: M. undina

Binomial name
- Macrocalcara undina (Meyrick, 1921)

Synonyms
- Apatetris undina Meyrick, 1921

Species of moth

Macrocalcara undina is a moth of the family Gelechiidae. It was described by Edward Meyrick in 1921. It is found in Zimbabwe.

The wingspan is about 9 mm. The forewings are whitish, thinly speckled with fuscous. The hindwings are whitish grey.
