= Mometa =

Scientific classification
- Kingdom: Animalia
- Phylum: Arthropoda
- Clade: Pancrustacea
- Class: Insecta
- Order: Lepidoptera
- Family: Gelechiidae
- Subfamily: Apatetrinae
- Tribe: Pexicopiini
- Genus: Mometa; Durrant, 1914

Genus of moths

Mometa is a genus of moths in the family Gelechiidae.

== Species ==
- Mometa anthophthora (Meyrick, 1937)
- Mometa chlidanopa Meyrick, 1927
- Mometa infricta (Meyrick, 1916)
- Mometa zemiodes Durrant, 1914
