= Photodotis photinopa =

Scientific classification
- Domain: Eukaryota
- Kingdom: Animalia
- Phylum: Arthropoda
- Class: Insecta
- Order: Lepidoptera
- Family: Gelechiidae
- Genus: Photodotis
- Species: P. photinopa

Binomial name
- Photodotis photinopa (Meyrick, 1920)

Synonyms
- Megacraspedus photinopa Meyrick, 1920

Species of moth

Photodotis photinopa is a moth of the family Gelechiidae. It was described by Edward Meyrick in 1920. It is found in South Africa.

The wingspan is about 13 mm. The forewings are white and with a rather broad whitish-ochreous streak sprinkled with grey and dark fuscous running from the base beneath the costa to one-third, then obliquely deflected to a small round yellow-whitish spot edged with a few dark scales representing the second discal stigma, and a similar streak from the middle of the base to a more obscure similar spot representing the plical stigma. There is some grey irroration (sprinkles) towards the costa at two-thirds, and two or three scales on the tornus. There is an apical spot of grey suffusion. The hindwings are light grey.
