= Proselotis sceletodes =

Scientific classification
- Kingdom: Animalia
- Phylum: Arthropoda
- Class: Insecta
- Order: Lepidoptera
- Family: Gelechiidae
- Genus: Proselotis
- Species: P. sceletodes

Binomial name
- Proselotis sceletodes Meyrick, 1914

Species of moth

Proselotis sceletodes is a moth of the family Gelechiidae. It was described by Edward Meyrick in 1914. It is found in Malawi.

The wingspan is about 11 mm. The forewings are pale ochreous mixed with fuscous in the disc, the costal area and fold suffused with whitish and sprinkled with dark fuscous. There are black dots in the disc at one-third, beyond the middle, and at three-fourths, and two on the fold obliquely before the two first of these. A fine streak of dark fuscous irroration (sprinkles) runs into the apex, and some undefined dots around the apical margin. The hindwings are grey.
