= Symbatica =

Scientific classification
- Kingdom: Animalia
- Phylum: Arthropoda
- Class: Insecta
- Order: Lepidoptera
- Family: Gelechiidae
- Subfamily: Gelechiinae
- Genus: Symbatica; Meyrick, 1910

Type species
- Symbatica cryphias Meyrick, 1910

Genus of moths

Symbatica is a genus of moth in the family Gelechiidae.

== Species ==
- Symbatica cryphias Meyrick, 1910
- Symbatica heimella Viette, 1954
