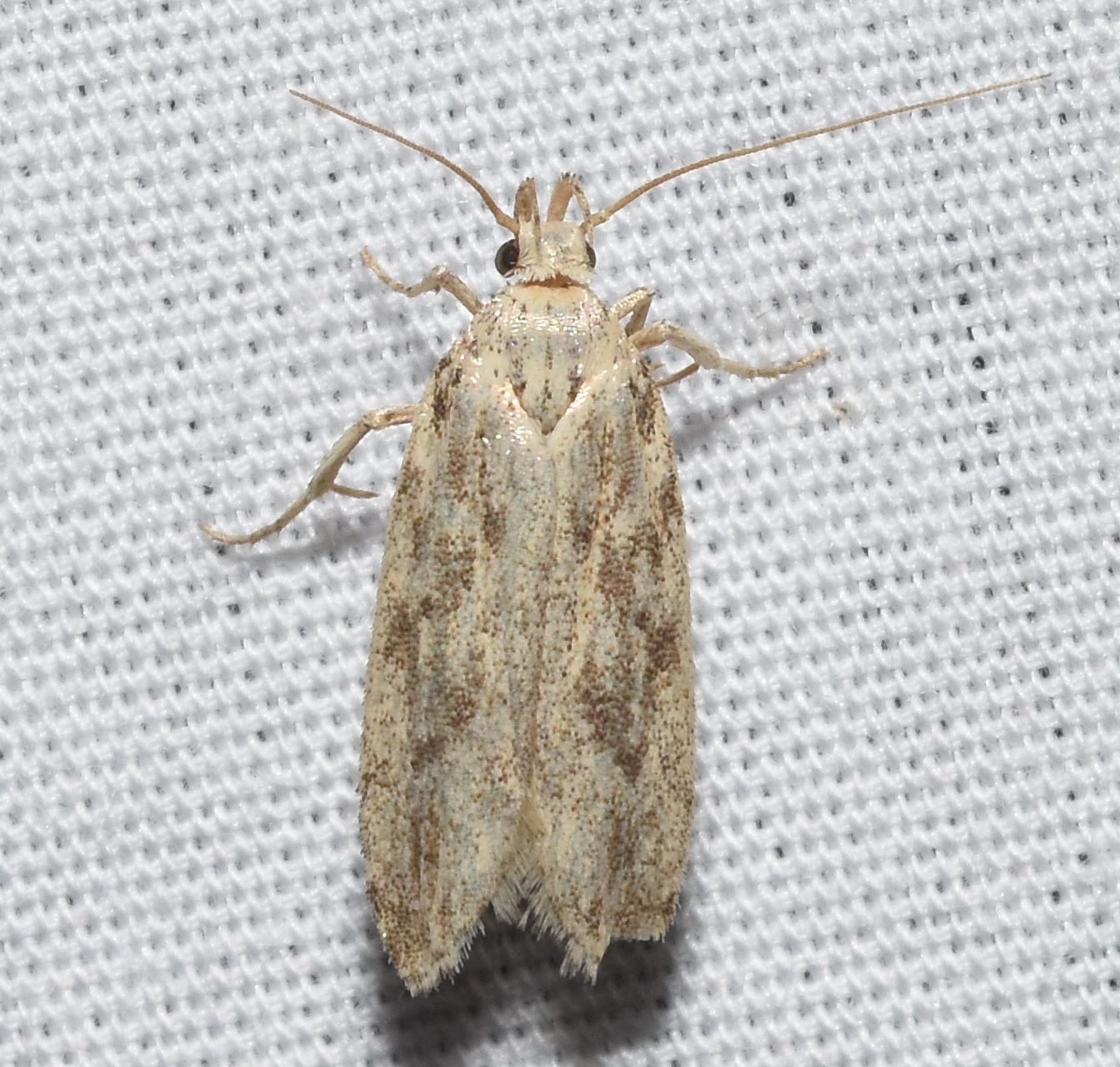
- Frumenta nundinella, Missouri

Scientific classification
- Kingdom: Animalia
- Phylum: Arthropoda
- Clade: Pancrustacea
- Class: Insecta
- Order: Lepidoptera
- Family: Gelechiidae
- Genus: Frumenta
- Species: F. nundinella

Binomial name
- Frumenta nundinella (Zeller, 1873)

Synonyms
- Gelechia nundinella Zeller, 1873; Gelechia beneficentella Murtfeldt, 1881

= Frumenta nundinella =

Species of moth

Frumenta nundinella is a moth in the family Gelechiidae. It was described by Zeller in 1873. It is found in North America, where it has been recorded from the eastern half of the United States.

The wingspan is about 24 mm. The forewings are pale buff or cream with ochreous shadings and a sparse dusting of blackish scales and with numerous, rather indefinite blackish or dark steel grey markings. The hindwings are silky cinereous with slight iridescence.

The larvae feed on Solanum carolinense. They fold the terminal leaves into round, hollow balls, each of which forms the shelter of a single larva which feeds on the incipient flower buds and the infolded edges of the tender leaves.
