= Acutitornus =

Scientific classification
- Domain: Eukaryota
- Kingdom: Animalia
- Phylum: Arthropoda
- Class: Insecta
- Order: Lepidoptera
- Family: Gelechiidae
- Subfamily: Apatetrinae
- Genus: Acutitornus; Janse, 1951

Genus of moths

Acutitornus is a genus of moth in the family Gelechiidae.

== Species ==
- Acutitornus kalahariensis Janse, 1958
- Acutitornus leucostola Janse, 1958
- Acutitornus liebenbergi Janse, 1963
- Acutitornus munda Janse, 1951
- Acutitornus munroi Janse, 1958
