= Lacistodes =

Scientific classification
- Domain: Eukaryota
- Kingdom: Animalia
- Phylum: Arthropoda
- Class: Insecta
- Order: Lepidoptera
- Family: Gelechiidae
- Tribe: Pexicopiini
- Genus: Lacistodes; Meyrick, 1921

Genus of moths

Lacistodes is a genus of moths in the family Gelechiidae.

== Species ==
- Lacistodes brunneostola Janse, 1960
- Lacistodes fuscomaculata Bidzilya & Mey, 2011
- Lacistodes tauropis Meyrick, 1921
