= Pycnodytis irrigata =

Scientific classification
- Domain: Eukaryota
- Kingdom: Animalia
- Phylum: Arthropoda
- Class: Insecta
- Order: Lepidoptera
- Family: Gelechiidae
- Genus: Pycnodytis
- Species: P. irrigata

Binomial name
- Pycnodytis irrigata Meyrick, 1918

Species of moth

Pycnodytis irrigata is a moth of the family Gelechiidae. It was described by Edward Meyrick in 1918. It is found on Madagascar.

The wingspan is 13–14 mm. The forewings are light brownish ochreous, the veins streaked with whitish ochreous and more or less strongly edged with dark fuscous irroration (sprinkles). There is a black dot beneath the costa at one-fifth, one beneath the fold below this, and one above the fold rather posterior. The stigmata are black, the plical slightly before the first discal. The hindwings are pale grey.
