= Blastovalva =

Scientific classification
- Domain: Eukaryota
- Kingdom: Animalia
- Phylum: Arthropoda
- Class: Insecta
- Order: Lepidoptera
- Family: Gelechiidae
- Subfamily: Anacampsinae
- Genus: Blastovalva; Janse, 1960

Genus of moths

Blastovalva is a genus of moths in the family Gelechiidae.

== Species ==
- Blastovalva anisochroa Janse, 1960
- Blastovalva haplotypa Janse, 1960
- Blastovalva paltobola (Meyrick, 1921)
