= Photodotis adornata =

Scientific classification
- Domain: Eukaryota
- Kingdom: Animalia
- Phylum: Arthropoda
- Class: Insecta
- Order: Lepidoptera
- Family: Gelechiidae
- Genus: Photodotis
- Species: P. adornata

Binomial name
- Photodotis adornata Omelko, 1993

Species of moth

Photodotis adornata is a moth of the family Gelechiidae. It was described by Omelko in 1993. It is found in the Russian Far East (Primorsky Krai), Korea and Japan.

The wingspan is 11–13 mm.
