= Mometa infricta =

Scientific classification
- Kingdom: Animalia
- Phylum: Arthropoda
- Class: Insecta
- Order: Lepidoptera
- Family: Gelechiidae
- Genus: Mometa
- Species: M. infricta

Binomial name
- Mometa infricta (Meyrick, 1916)

Synonyms
- Parapsectris infricta Meyrick, 1916

Species of moth

Mometa infricta is a moth of the family Gelechiidae. It was described by Edward Meyrick in 1916. It is found in Malawi.

The wingspan is about 22 mm. The forewings are dark purplish fuscous with white spots on the costa at one-sixth and on the dorsum opposite, with a few white scales between these. There is an irregular undefined slender slightly oblique white median fascia, sinuate outwards in the middle, obsolescent on the dorsum. There is a conspicuous irregular white spot on the costa beyond three-fourths and a smaller one on the tornus opposite, with a few white scales between these. There are also two or three white scales on the termen. The hindwings are grey, darker posteriorly.
