= Pycnodytis =

Scientific classification
- Domain: Eukaryota
- Kingdom: Animalia
- Phylum: Arthropoda
- Class: Insecta
- Order: Lepidoptera
- Family: Gelechiidae
- Subfamily: Gelechiinae
- Genus: Pycnodytis; Meyrick, 1918

Genus of moths

Pycnodytis is a genus of moths in the family Gelechiidae.

== Species ==
- Pycnodytis erebaula Meyrick, 1918 (from South Africa)
- Pycnodytis irrigata Meyrick, 1918 (from Madagascar)
