= Holaxyra =

Scientific classification
- Domain: Eukaryota
- Kingdom: Animalia
- Phylum: Arthropoda
- Class: Insecta
- Order: Lepidoptera
- Family: Gelechiidae
- Subfamily: Dichomeridinae
- Genus: Holaxyra; Meyrick, 1913

Genus of moths

Holaxyra is a genus of moths in the family Gelechiidae.

== Species ==
- Holaxyra acuta (Meyrick, 1927)
- Holaxyra ancylosticha (Turner, 1919)
- Holaxyra ithyaula (Meyrick, 1926)
- Holaxyra picrophanes (Meyrick, 1913)
