= Photodotis =

Scientific classification
- Domain: Eukaryota
- Kingdom: Animalia
- Phylum: Arthropoda
- Class: Insecta
- Order: Lepidoptera
- Family: Gelechiidae
- Subfamily: Anomologinae
- Genus: Photodotis; Meyrick, 1911

Genus of moths

Photodotis is a genus of moth in the family Gelechiidae.

== Species ==
- Photodotis abachausi Janse, 1958
- Photodotis adornata Omelko, 1993
- Photodotis palens Omelko, 1993
- Photodotis pellochroa Janse, 1960
- Photodotis photinopa (Meyrick, 1920)
- Photodotis prochalina Meyrick, 1911
- Photodotis spilodoma Meyrick, 1918
