= Ptychovalva =

Scientific classification
- Domain: Eukaryota
- Kingdom: Animalia
- Phylum: Arthropoda
- Class: Insecta
- Order: Lepidoptera
- Family: Gelechiidae
- Tribe: Chelariini
- Genus: Ptychovalva; Janse, 1958

Genus of moths

Ptychovalva is a genus of moth in the family Gelechiidae.

== Species ==
- Ptychovalva obruta Meyrick, 1921
- Ptychovalva trigella Zeller, 1852
- Ptychovalva trimaculata Janse, 1960
