= Symbatica heimella =

Scientific classification
- Kingdom: Animalia
- Phylum: Arthropoda
- Class: Insecta
- Order: Lepidoptera
- Family: Gelechiidae
- Genus: Symbatica
- Species: S. heimella

Binomial name
- Symbatica heimella Viette, 1954

Species of moth

Symbatica heimella is a moth in the family Gelechiidae. It was described by Viette in 1954. It is found in Madagascar.
