= Proselotis =

Scientific classification
- Domain: Eukaryota
- Kingdom: Animalia
- Phylum: Arthropoda
- Class: Insecta
- Order: Lepidoptera
- Family: Gelechiidae
- Subfamily: Anomologinae
- Genus: Proselotis; Meyrick, 1914

Synonyms
- Idiobela Turner, 1919

Genus of moths

Proselotis is a genus of moth in the family Gelechiidae.

== Species ==
- Proselotis apicipunctella (Stainton, 1859)
- Proselotis ischnoptila (Turner, 1919)
- Proselotis sceletodes (Meyrick, 1914)
- Proselotis strictula (Meyrick, 1937)
