= Proselotis apicipunctella =

Scientific classification
- Kingdom: Animalia
- Phylum: Arthropoda
- Clade: Pancrustacea
- Class: Insecta
- Order: Lepidoptera
- Family: Gelechiidae
- Genus: Proselotis
- Species: P. apicipunctella

Binomial name
- Proselotis apicipunctella (Stainton, 1859)

Synonyms
- Parasia apicipunctella Stainton, 1859

Species of moth

Proselotis apicipunctella is a moth of the family Gelechiidae. It was described by Henry Tibbats Stainton in 1859. It is found in India (Bengal).

The forewings are dull-ochreous, veined with darker, with some scattered blackish atoms, and an elongate black dot on the disc before the middle. A row of black dots goes around the acute apex. The hindwings are pale grey, darker at the base.
