= Mometa anthophthora =

Scientific classification
- Kingdom: Animalia
- Phylum: Arthropoda
- Class: Insecta
- Order: Lepidoptera
- Family: Gelechiidae
- Genus: Mometa
- Species: M. anthophthora

Binomial name
- Mometa anthophthora (Meyrick, 1937)

Synonyms
- Telphusa anthophthora Meyrick, 1937

Species of moth

Mometa anthophthora is a moth of the family Gelechiidae. It was described by Edward Meyrick in 1937. It is found in Uganda.

The wingspan is about 15 mm.

The larvae feed on the flowerheads of Dombeya emarginata.
