= Parathectis =

Scientific classification
- Domain: Eukaryota
- Kingdom: Animalia
- Phylum: Arthropoda
- Class: Insecta
- Order: Lepidoptera
- Family: Gelechiidae
- Tribe: Gelechiini
- Genus: Parathectis; Janse, 1958

Genus of moths

Parathectis is a genus of moth in the family Gelechiidae.

== Species ==
- Parathectis farinata (Meyrick, 1913)
- Parathectis sordidula (Meyrick, 1913)
