= Encolpotis scioplasta =

Scientific classification
- Domain: Eukaryota
- Kingdom: Animalia
- Phylum: Arthropoda
- Class: Insecta
- Order: Lepidoptera
- Family: Gelechiidae
- Genus: Encolpotis
- Species: E. scioplasta

Binomial name
- Encolpotis scioplasta Meyrick, 1920

Species of moth

Encolpotis scioplasta is a moth in the family Gelechiidae. It was described by Edward Meyrick in 1920. It is found in Kenya.
