= Anomologa =

Scientific classification
- Domain: Eukaryota
- Kingdom: Animalia
- Phylum: Arthropoda
- Class: Insecta
- Order: Lepidoptera
- Family: Gelechiidae
- Subfamily: Anomologinae
- Genus: Anomologa; Meyrick, 1926

Genus of moths

Anomologa is a genus of moth in the family Gelechiidae.

== Species ==
- Anomologa demens Meyrick, 1926
- Anomologa dispulsa Meyrick, 1926
