= Encolpotis heliopepta =

Scientific classification
- Domain: Eukaryota
- Kingdom: Animalia
- Phylum: Arthropoda
- Class: Insecta
- Order: Lepidoptera
- Family: Gelechiidae
- Genus: Encolpotis
- Species: E. heliopepta

Binomial name
- Encolpotis heliopepta Meyrick, 1918

Species of moth

Encolpotis heliopepta is a moth in the family Gelechiidae. It was described by Edward Meyrick in 1918. It is found in Assam, India.

The wingspan is about 14 mm. The forewings are purple fuscous, rather darker towards the costa and termen. The stigmata are cloudy, obscurely darker, with the plical beneath the first discal, the second discal transversely double. The hindwings are dark grey.
