= Proselotis ischnoptila =

Scientific classification
- Domain: Eukaryota
- Kingdom: Animalia
- Phylum: Arthropoda
- Class: Insecta
- Order: Lepidoptera
- Family: Gelechiidae
- Genus: Proselotis
- Species: P. ischnoptila

Binomial name
- Proselotis ischnoptila (Turner, 1919)

Synonyms
- Idiobela ischnoptila Turner, 1919; Proselotis amphiptila Meyrick, 1921

Species of moth

Proselotis ischnoptila is a moth of the family Gelechiidae. It was described by Alfred Jefferis Turner in 1919. It is found in Australia, where it has been recorded from Queensland.

The wingspan is about 11 mm. The forewings are ochreous-whitish irrorated with pale-fuscous, with an elongate blackish subcostal dot near the base, and another at one-fourth. There are blackish dots in the disc on the fold at one-third, a second before the middle, and a third at two-thirds above the tornus. The wing beyond the third dot is more fuscous. The hindwings are pale grey.
