= Khoisa (moth) =

Scientific classification
- Kingdom: Animalia
- Phylum: Arthropoda
- Clade: Pancrustacea
- Class: Insecta
- Order: Lepidoptera
- Family: Gelechiidae
- Subfamily: Gelechiinae
- Genus: Khoisa; Bidzilya & Mey, 2011

Genus of moths

Khoisa is a genus of moths in the family Gelechiidae.

== Species ==
- Khoisa epicentra (Meyrick, 1909)
- Khoisa glauca (Janse, 1960)
- Khoisa panaula (Meyrick, 1909)
- Khoisa triloba (Janse, 1960)
