= Araeovalva =

Scientific classification
- Kingdom: Animalia
- Phylum: Arthropoda
- Clade: Pancrustacea
- Class: Insecta
- Order: Lepidoptera
- Family: Gelechiidae
- Tribe: Gelechiini
- Genus: Araeovalva; Janse, 1960

Synonyms
- Stenovalva Janse, 1958 (preocc. Amsel, 1955)

Genus of moths

Araeovalva is a genus of moths in the family Gelechiidae.

== Species ==
- Araeovalva albiflora (Meyrick, 1920)
- Araeovalva minor Janse, 1960
