= Lanceopenna =

Scientific classification
- Domain: Eukaryota
- Kingdom: Animalia
- Phylum: Arthropoda
- Class: Insecta
- Order: Lepidoptera
- Family: Gelechiidae
- Subfamily: Gelechiinae
- Genus: Lanceopenna; Janse, 1950

Genus of moths

Lanceopenna is a genus of moths in the family Gelechiidae.

== Species ==
- Lanceopenna pentastigma Janse, 1960
- Lanceopenna prominula (Meyrick, 1913)
- Lanceopenna pseudogaleotis Janse, 1950
