= Macrocalcara =

Scientific classification
- Kingdom: Animalia
- Phylum: Arthropoda
- Class: Insecta
- Order: Lepidoptera
- Family: Gelechiidae
- Genus: Macrocalcara; Janse, 1951

Genus of moths

Macrocalcara is a genus of moth in the family Gelechiidae.

== Species ==
- Macrocalcara sporima Janse, 1960
- Macrocalcara undina (Meyrick, 1921)
