= Mometa chlidanopa =

Scientific classification
- Kingdom: Animalia
- Phylum: Arthropoda
- Class: Insecta
- Order: Lepidoptera
- Family: Gelechiidae
- Genus: Mometa
- Species: M. chlidanopa

Binomial name
- Mometa chlidanopa Meyrick, 1927

Species of moth

Mometa chlidanopa is a moth of the family Gelechiidae. It was described by Edward Meyrick in 1927. It is found in Uganda.

The wingspan is about 17 mm. The forewings are purple blackish, somewhat speckled with ochreous whitish and with the markings light yellow ochreous, consisting of a streak from the middle of the base, upcurved beneath the costa to one-fourth, an irregular oblique transverse fasciate blotch in the middle of the disc not reaching the margins, a subtriangular spot on the costa at four-fifths, and a cloudy dot on the tornus opposite. The hindwings are grey.

The larvae feed on Hibiscus species.
