= Holaxyra ancylosticha =

Scientific classification
- Domain: Eukaryota
- Kingdom: Animalia
- Phylum: Arthropoda
- Class: Insecta
- Order: Lepidoptera
- Family: Gelechiidae
- Genus: Holaxyra
- Species: H. ancylosticha

Binomial name
- Holaxyra ancylosticha (Turner, 1919)

Synonyms
- Dichomeris ancylosticha Turner, 1919

Species of moth

Holaxyra ancylosticha is a moth in the family Gelechiidae. It was described by Alfred Jefferis Turner in 1919. It is found in Australia, where it has been recorded from Queensland.

The wingspan is about 20 mm. The forewings are fuscous with a broad median blackish streak from the base, soon bent to above the fold and narrowing to a point at two-fifths. The first discal touches or is found just beyond the apex of the streak, the second at three-fifths, with the blackish plical before the first discal. There is a whitish costal suffusion containing some ferruginous scales. The hindwings are dark-grey.
