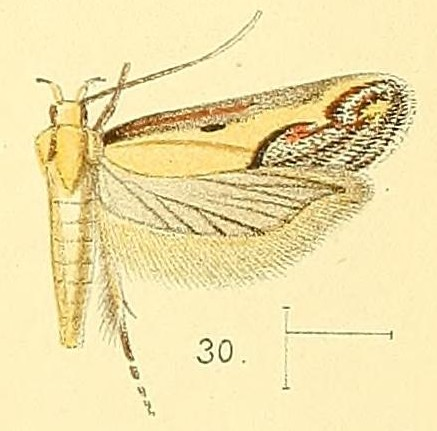
- Aspades hutchinsonella

Scientific classification
- Kingdom: Animalia
- Phylum: Arthropoda
- Class: Insecta
- Order: Lepidoptera
- Family: Gelechiidae
- Tribe: Pexicopiini
- Genus: Aspades; Vári in Vári & Kroon, 1986

Type species
- *Gelechia hutchinsonella Walsingham, 1891

Synonyms
- Aspasiodes Janse, 1958

= Aspades =

Genus of moths

Aspades is a genus of moth in the family Gelechiidae.

== Species ==
- Aspades armatovalva (Janse, 1963)
- Aspades hutchinsonella (Walsingham, 1891)
- Aspades luteomaculata Bidzilya & Mey, 2011
