= Aeolotrocha =

Scientific classification
- Domain: Eukaryota
- Kingdom: Animalia
- Phylum: Arthropoda
- Class: Insecta
- Order: Lepidoptera
- Family: Gelechiidae
- Subfamily: Gelechiinae
- Genus: Aeolotrocha; Meyrick, 1921

Genus of moths

Aeolotrocha is a genus of moth in the family Gelechiidae.

== Species ==
- Aeolotrocha delograpta Janse, 1960
- Aeolotrocha generosa Meyrick, 1921
- Aeolotrocha paroptila Janse, 1960
- Aeolotrocha phaeoptera Janse, 1960
