= Frumenta =

Scientific classification
- Kingdom: Animalia
- Phylum: Arthropoda
- Class: Insecta
- Order: Lepidoptera
- Family: Gelechiidae
- Tribe: Gnorimoschemini
- Genus: Frumenta; Busck, 1939

Genus of moths

Frumenta is a genus of moths in the family Gelechiidae.

== Species ==
- Frumenta nephelomicta (Meyrick, 1930)
- Frumenta nundinella (Zeller, 1873)
- Frumenta solanophaga Adamski & Brown, 2002
