= Frumenta solanophaga =

Scientific classification
- Kingdom: Animalia
- Phylum: Arthropoda
- Clade: Pancrustacea
- Class: Insecta
- Order: Lepidoptera
- Family: Gelechiidae
- Genus: Frumenta
- Species: F. solanophaga

Binomial name
- Frumenta solanophaga Adamski & Brown, 2002

Species of moth

Frumenta solanophaga is a moth in the family Gelechiidae. It was described by Adamski and Brown in 2002. It is found in Mexico (San Luis Potosi).
