= Dichomeris tridentata =

Scientific classification
- Kingdom: Animalia
- Phylum: Arthropoda
- Clade: Pancrustacea
- Class: Insecta
- Order: Lepidoptera
- Family: Gelechiidae
- Genus: Dichomeris
- Species: D. tridentata

Binomial name
- Dichomeris tridentata (Janse, 1954)

Synonyms
- Trichotaphe tridentata Janse, 1954

Species of moth

Dichomeris tridentata is a moth in the family Gelechiidae. It was described by Anthonie Johannes Theodorus Janse in 1954. It is found in Mozambique.
