= Dichomeris stasimopa =

Scientific classification
- Kingdom: Animalia
- Phylum: Arthropoda
- Class: Insecta
- Order: Lepidoptera
- Family: Gelechiidae
- Genus: Dichomeris
- Species: D. stasimopa

Binomial name
- Dichomeris stasimopa Meyrick, 1937

Species of moth

Dichomeris stasimopa is a moth in the family Gelechiidae. It was described by Edward Meyrick in 1937. It is found in South Africa.

The wingspan is 12–13 mm.
