= Dichomeris analoxa =

Scientific classification
- Kingdom: Animalia
- Phylum: Arthropoda
- Class: Insecta
- Order: Lepidoptera
- Family: Gelechiidae
- Genus: Dichomeris
- Species: D. analoxa

Binomial name
- Dichomeris analoxa (Meyrick, 1911)

Synonyms
- Schematistis analoxa Meyrick, 1911

Species of moth

Dichomeris analoxa is a moth in the family Gelechiidae. It was described by Edward Meyrick in 1911. It is found in South Africa.

The wingspan is about 14 mm. The forewings are ashy grey, sprinkled with whitish and with the costal edge suffused with dark fuscous from the base to beyond the middle. There are three undefined fasciae of dark fuscous suffusion, the first broad, from the middle of the costa to the dorsum before the middle, obliquely interrupted above the middle, the second narrow, from five-sixths of the costa to two-thirds of the dorsum, the third moderate, terminal, confluent with the second above the middle. The second discal stigma is dark fuscous. The hindwings are grey.
