= Dichomeris oxygrapha =

Scientific classification
- Kingdom: Animalia
- Phylum: Arthropoda
- Class: Insecta
- Order: Lepidoptera
- Family: Gelechiidae
- Genus: Dichomeris
- Species: D. oxygrapha

Binomial name
- Dichomeris oxygrapha (Meyrick, 1913)

Synonyms
- Trichotaphe oxygrapha Meyrick, 1913

Species of moth

Dichomeris oxygrapha is a moth in the family Gelechiidae. It was described by Edward Meyrick in 1913. It is found in South Africa and Mozambique.

The wingspan is 14–16 mm. The forewings are dark grey, with a slight bluish or purplish tinge and with the costal edge ochreous white from the base to two-thirds, marked at the base with a black dot. There is a large cloudy dark fuscous sometimes transverse dot in the disc at one-fourth. The stigmata are rather large, cloudy, dark fuscous, the plical somewhat obliquely before the first discal, both these sometimes followed by one or two white scales, the second discal transverse. There is also an ochreous-whitish dot on the costa at three-fourths, where a fine zigzag line of whitish scales runs to the tornus, sometimes hardly traceable. A series of blackish dots is found around the apical portion of the costa and termen. The hindwings are rather dark grey.
