= Holaxyra acuta =

Scientific classification
- Kingdom: Animalia
- Phylum: Arthropoda
- Class: Insecta
- Order: Lepidoptera
- Family: Gelechiidae
- Genus: Holaxyra
- Species: H. acuta

Binomial name
- Holaxyra acuta (Meyrick, 1927)

Synonyms
- Dichomeris acuta Meyrick, 1927

Species of moth

Holaxyra acuta is a moth in the family Gelechiidae. It was described by Edward Meyrick in 1927. It is found in South Africa.

The wingspan is about 19 mm. The forewings are whitish mixed with light grey, with the veins grey. There is a strong grey median stripe from the base to the apex, becoming dark fuscous on the upper edge, the costal area above this wholly clear white. There are three or four undefined dark fuscous or blackish terminal dots. The hindwings are pale grey.
