= Pycnodytis erebaula =

Scientific classification
- Domain: Eukaryota
- Kingdom: Animalia
- Phylum: Arthropoda
- Class: Insecta
- Order: Lepidoptera
- Family: Gelechiidae
- Genus: Pycnodytis
- Species: P. erebaula

Binomial name
- Pycnodytis erebaula Meyrick, 1918

Species of moth

Pycnodytis erebaula is a moth of the family Gelechiidae. It was described by Edward Meyrick in 1918. It is found in South Africa.

The wingspan is 11–12 mm. The forewings are dark fuscous, in one specimen with the dorsal half suffused with brownish. The stigmata are black, the plical obliquely before the first discal, indistinct or obsolete. The hindwings are light grey.
