= Dichomeris furvellus =

Scientific classification
- Kingdom: Animalia
- Phylum: Arthropoda
- Clade: Pancrustacea
- Class: Insecta
- Order: Lepidoptera
- Family: Gelechiidae
- Genus: Dichomeris
- Species: D. furvellus

Binomial name
- Dichomeris furvellus (Zeller, 1852)

Synonyms
- Ypsolophus furvellus Zeller, 1852; Trichotaphe furvellus

Species of moth

Dichomeris furvellus is a moth in the family Gelechiidae. It was described by Zeller in 1852. It is found in South Africa and Zimbabwe.
