= Photodotis spilodoma =

Scientific classification
- Kingdom: Animalia
- Phylum: Arthropoda
- Clade: Pancrustacea
- Class: Insecta
- Order: Lepidoptera
- Family: Gelechiidae
- Genus: Photodotis
- Species: P. spilodoma

Binomial name
- Photodotis spilodoma Meyrick, 1918

Species of moth

Photodotis spilodoma is a moth of the family Gelechiidae. It was described by Edward Meyrick in 1918. It is found in South Africa.

The wingspan is about 13 mm. The forewings are dark fuscous irrorated (sprinkled) with whitish, the dorsal area on the anterior half of the wing is suffused with whitish ochreous, anteriorly extending two-thirds of the way across the wing. There is a blotch of blackish irroration representing the plical and first discal stigmata, and a small spot on the costa above it. A small brownish spot is found on the tornus, connected by a cloudy blackish dot surmounted by a similar ochreous dot with an indistinct dark second discal stigma. A small cloudy whitish spot is found on the costa at three-fourths and there are two short ochreous streaks above and two below apex, separated by blackish irroration. The hindwings are grey.
