= Scrobipalpa costimacula =

Scientific classification
- Domain: Eukaryota
- Kingdom: Animalia
- Phylum: Arthropoda
- Class: Insecta
- Order: Lepidoptera
- Family: Gelechiidae
- Genus: Scrobipalpa
- Species: S. costimacula

Binomial name
- Scrobipalpa costimacula Janse, 1960

Species of moth

Scrobipalpa costimacula is a moth in the family Gelechiidae. It was described by Anthonie Johannes Theodorus Janse in 1960. It is found in South Africa.
