= Dichomeris aulotoma =

Scientific classification
- Kingdom: Animalia
- Phylum: Arthropoda
- Class: Insecta
- Order: Lepidoptera
- Family: Gelechiidae
- Genus: Dichomeris
- Species: D. aulotoma

Binomial name
- Dichomeris aulotoma Meyrick, 1917

Synonyms
- Picroptera aulotoma; Dichomeris interamna Meyrick, 1926

Species of moth

Dichomeris aulotoma is a moth in the family Gelechiidae. It was described by Edward Meyrick in 1917. It is found in South Africa.

The wingspan is about 20 mm (0.79 in). The forewings are rather dark fuscous with a white streak along the costa from the base nearly to one-third, and a subcostal streak from beyond the extremity of this to the costa before the apex. There is a white subdorsal streak rising from the base of the dorsum and running to the termen beneath the apex, posteriorly somewhat ragged. The hindwings are grey.
