= Dichomeris orthacma =

Scientific classification
- Kingdom: Animalia
- Phylum: Arthropoda
- Class: Insecta
- Order: Lepidoptera
- Family: Gelechiidae
- Genus: Dichomeris
- Species: D. orthacma

Binomial name
- Dichomeris orthacma (Meyrick, 1926)

Synonyms
- Picroptera orthacma; Megacraspedus taphrites Meyrick, 1937

Species of moth

Dichomeris orthacma is a moth in the family Gelechiidae. It was described by Edward Meyrick in 1926. It is found in South Africa.

The wingspan is about 13 mm. The forewings are white irregularly sprinkled with fuscous and with a rather broad fuscous median streak from the base to the apex, the upper edge mixed with dark fuscous. There is a black dot on the fold beneath the middle of the wing and a marginal series of black dots on the apical part of the costa and termen. The hindwings are whitish grey.
