= Symbatica cryphias =

Scientific classification
- Domain: Eukaryota
- Kingdom: Animalia
- Phylum: Arthropoda
- Class: Insecta
- Order: Lepidoptera
- Family: Gelechiidae
- Genus: Symbatica
- Species: S. cryphias

Binomial name
- Symbatica cryphias Meyrick, 1910

Species of moth

Symbatica cryphias is a moth in the family Gelechiidae. It was described by Edward Meyrick in 1910. It is found in South Africa.

The wingspan is about 25 mm. The forewings are grey sprinkled with black and white. The discal stigmata are represented by small spots of blackish sprinkles connected by a streak of white suffusion. The hindwings are grey.
