= Dichomeris exsecta =

Scientific classification
- Kingdom: Animalia
- Phylum: Arthropoda
- Clade: Pancrustacea
- Class: Insecta
- Order: Lepidoptera
- Family: Gelechiidae
- Genus: Dichomeris
- Species: D. exsecta

Binomial name
- Dichomeris exsecta Meyrick, 1927

Species of moth

Dichomeris exsecta is a moth in the family Gelechiidae. It was described by Edward Meyrick in 1927. It is found in Zimbabwe.

The wingspan is about 17 mm. The forewings are light brownish ochreous, slightly mottled with grey and a few black scales. The costa is mottled dark fuscous and there is some dark strigulation towards the dorsum. The stigmata are black, each with an adjacent grey anterior spot, the discal rather near together, the plical slightly before the first discal. There is a narrow terminal fascia of dark grey suffusion, marked with terminal dots of ground colour. The hindwings are grey.
