= Dichomeris meridionella =

Scientific classification
- Domain: Eukaryota
- Kingdom: Animalia
- Phylum: Arthropoda
- Class: Insecta
- Order: Lepidoptera
- Family: Gelechiidae
- Genus: Dichomeris
- Species: D. meridionella

Binomial name
- Dichomeris meridionella (Walsingham, 1881)

Synonyms
- Nothris meridionella Walsingham, 1881

Species of moth

Dichomeris meridionella is a moth in the family Gelechiidae. It is found in South Africa.

The wingspan is about 15 mm. The forewings are ochreous, with four small fuscous dots, the largest at the end of the cell, the other three much smaller. The first on the disc at about one-fifth from the base, the second also on the disc just before the middle, the third on the fold lying obliquely below and before the second. The apical margin is slightly shaded with fuscous, with two or three small marginal fuscous dots above the anal angle. The hindwings are cinereous.
