= Dichomeris byrsoxantha =

Scientific classification
- Kingdom: Animalia
- Phylum: Arthropoda
- Class: Insecta
- Order: Lepidoptera
- Family: Gelechiidae
- Genus: Dichomeris
- Species: D. byrsoxantha

Binomial name
- Dichomeris byrsoxantha (Meyrick, 1918)

Synonyms
- Trichotaphe byrsoxantha Meyrick, 1918

Species of moth

Dichomeris byrsoxantha is a moth in the family Gelechiidae. It was described by Edward Meyrick in 1918. It is found in South Africa.

The wingspan is about 17 mm (0.67 in). The forewings are ochreous orange tinged with ferruginous. The stigmata are dark fuscous, the discal approximated, transverse, the first rather oblique, the plical dot like, beneath the first discal. There is a terminal series of dark fuscous dots. The hindwings are grey.
