= Dichomeris tephrodes =

Scientific classification
- Kingdom: Animalia
- Phylum: Arthropoda
- Class: Insecta
- Order: Lepidoptera
- Family: Gelechiidae
- Genus: Dichomeris
- Species: D. tephrodes

Binomial name
- Dichomeris tephrodes (Meyrick, 1909)

Synonyms
- Ypsolophus tephrodes Meyrick, 1909; Neopachnistis tephrodes; Ilingiotis tephrodes ab. castanea Ghesquière, 1940

Species of moth

Dichomeris tephrodes is a moth in the family Gelechiidae. It was described by Edward Meyrick in 1909. It is found in the Republic of the Congo, the Democratic Republic of the Congo (Équateur) and Gauteng in South Africa.

The wingspan is about 17 mm. The forewings are ochreous brownish, more ochreous towards the costa anteriorly. The costal edge is blackish towards the base. The stigmata is moderate, dark fuscous, with the discal approximated, the plical spot is obliquely before the first discal. The posterior portion of the wing is slightly infuscated with an indistinct curved transverse shade of ground colour at about four-fifths. The hindwings are rather dark grey.

The larvae feed on Coffea robusta and Chomelia laurentii.
