= Dichomeris argentaria =

Scientific classification
- Kingdom: Animalia
- Phylum: Arthropoda
- Clade: Pancrustacea
- Class: Insecta
- Order: Lepidoptera
- Family: Gelechiidae
- Genus: Dichomeris
- Species: D. argentaria

Binomial name
- Dichomeris argentaria Meyrick, 1913

Species of moth

Dichomeris argentaria is a species of moth in the family Gelechiidae. It was described by Edward Meyrick in 1913.

== Distribution ==
It is found in Mpumalanga, South Africa.

== Description ==
The wingspan is 13–14 mm. The forewings are light yellow ochreous with the costal edge slenderly suffused with dark fuscous from the base almost to the apex, beneath this with a faint pale iridescent-silvery streak to two-thirds. A similar slender silvery streak is found along the fold from the base to one-fourth, and two silvery streaks from the costa before and beyond the middle converging towards the dorsum beyond the middle. The dorsal area beneath the fold is deep ferruginous, paler towards the base, and the dorsum suffused with dark fuscous on the posterior half. There is a dark brown trapezoidal blotch resting on the dorsum and reaching halfway across the wing, its upper edge excavated, the corners of this excavation marked with two black dots. There is also a slender dark grey terminal fascia crossed by four black marks. The hindwings are grey, rather darker posteriorly.
