= Photodotis prochalina =

Scientific classification
- Kingdom: Animalia
- Phylum: Arthropoda
- Clade: Pancrustacea
- Class: Insecta
- Order: Lepidoptera
- Family: Gelechiidae
- Genus: Photodotis
- Species: P. prochalina

Binomial name
- Photodotis prochalina Meyrick, 1911

Species of moth

Photodotis prochalina is a moth of the family Gelechiidae. It was described by Edward Meyrick in 1911. It is found in South Africa.

The wingspan is 10–11 mm. The forewings are dark grey closely irrorated (sprinkled) with white points or partially suffused with ochreous whitish, especially towards the dorsum anteriorly. There are two spots of black suffusion beneath the costa near the base, alternating with whitish suffusion. There is an ochreous-yellow oblique irregular streak from the costa before the middle, reaching halfway across the wing, and an ochreous-yellow dorsal spot opposite its apex, these margined anteriorly by a curved transverse streak of blackish suffusion which also fills the space between them. An ochreous-yellow transverse spot is found in the disc at three-quarters, connected with the costa by a spot of dark fuscous suffusion, and with a smaller dark fuscous spot adjacent beneath. There is a small white spot on the costa beyond this, where a curved ochreous-yellowish streak runs near the margin around the costa and apex. The apical and terminal edge are whitish, with several dark fuscous dots. The hindwings are grey.
