= Holaxyra ithyaula =

Scientific classification
- Kingdom: Animalia
- Phylum: Arthropoda
- Class: Insecta
- Order: Lepidoptera
- Family: Gelechiidae
- Genus: Holaxyra
- Species: H. ithyaula

Binomial name
- Holaxyra ithyaula (Meyrick, 1926)

Synonyms
- Dichomeris ithyaula Meyrick, 1926

Species of moth

Holaxyra ithyaula is a moth in the family Gelechiidae. It was described by Edward Meyrick in 1926. It is found in South Africa.

The wingspan is about 21 mm (0.83 in). The forewings are white with the costal edge dark fuscous from the base to four-fifths and with a rather broad dark fuscous median streak from the base to the apex. The dorsal edge is dark fuscous from beyond the middle to the tornus and there are several black marginal dots on the apical part of the costa and termen. The hindwings are pale greyish.
