= Aeolotrocha generosa =

Scientific classification
- Domain: Eukaryota
- Kingdom: Animalia
- Phylum: Arthropoda
- Class: Insecta
- Order: Lepidoptera
- Family: Gelechiidae
- Genus: Aeolotrocha
- Species: A. generosa

Binomial name
- Aeolotrocha generosa Meyrick, 1921

Species of moth

Aeolotrocha generosa is a species of moth in the family Gelechiidae. It was described by Edward Meyrick in 1921. It is found in South Africa.

The wingspan is about 11 mm. The forewings are dark violet-grey with a broad ochreous-whitish streak along the anterior half of the costa, limited beneath by a nearly equally broad black streak, the end of the white streak produced obliquely downwards as an irregular brownish posteriorly black-edged line terminating in a small triangular black discal spot representing the second discal stigma. The anterior half of the dorsum is narrowly blackish, terminated by an oblique transverse black spot from the middle of the dorsum, followed by a spot of whitish suffusion. There is an oblique ochreous-white wedge-shaped streak from the costa at two-thirds, finely attenuated and terminating in a semicircular ochreous-white tornal spot, these edged anteriorly with brown suffusion. The terminal edge of the tornal spot is black and there are three subconfluent spots of ochreous-white suffusion on the costa before the apex, as well as a black streak along the upper part of the termen, reaching the tornal spot, its lower portion forming two acute anterior projections. The hindwings are light grey.
