= Dichomeris introspiciens =

Scientific classification
- Kingdom: Animalia
- Phylum: Arthropoda
- Class: Insecta
- Order: Lepidoptera
- Family: Gelechiidae
- Genus: Dichomeris
- Species: D. introspiciens

Binomial name
- Dichomeris introspiciens (Meyrick, 1926)

Synonyms
- Trichotaphe introspiciens Meyrick, 1926

Species of moth

Dichomeris introspiciens is a moth in the family Gelechiidae. It was described by Edward Meyrick in 1926. It is found in South Africa, where it has been recorded from KwaZulu-Natal.

The wingspan is about 17 mm. The forewings are light brownish ochreous slightly speckled with fuscous, paler towards the costa and with the costal edged whitish tinged except towards the apex. The stigmata are cloudy, dark fuscous, the plical beneath the first discal, these edged posteriorly and the second discal anteriorly by a few whitish scales. There is a terminal series of minute indistinct dark fuscous dots. The hindwings are grey.
