= Photodotis abachausi =

Scientific classification
- Domain: Eukaryota
- Kingdom: Animalia
- Phylum: Arthropoda
- Class: Insecta
- Order: Lepidoptera
- Family: Gelechiidae
- Genus: Photodotis
- Species: P. abachausi

Binomial name
- Photodotis abachausi Janse, 1958

Species of moth

Photodotis abachausi is a moth of the family Gelechiidae. It was described by Anthonie Johannes Theodorus Janse in 1958. It is found in South Africa.
