= Leucophylla =

Scientific classification
- Domain: Eukaryota
- Kingdom: Animalia
- Phylum: Arthropoda
- Class: Insecta
- Order: Lepidoptera
- Family: Gelechiidae
- Subfamily: Gelechiinae
- Genus: Leucophylla; Janse, 1960
- Species: L. nigribasis

Binomial name
- Leucophylla nigribasis Janse, 1960

Genus of moths

Leucophylla is a genus of moth in the family Gelechiidae. It contains the species Leucophylla nigribasis, which is found in Namibia and South Africa.
