= Lacistodes tauropis =

Scientific classification
- Kingdom: Animalia
- Phylum: Arthropoda
- Class: Insecta
- Order: Lepidoptera
- Family: Gelechiidae
- Genus: Lacistodes
- Species: L. tauropis

Binomial name
- Lacistodes tauropis Meyrick, 1921

Species of moth

Lacistodes tauropis is a moth of the family Gelechiidae. It was described by Edward Meyrick in 1921. It is found in Namibia, South Africa and Zimbabwe.

The wingspan is about 18 mm. The forewings are whitish ochreous, suffusedly striated transversely with dark fuscous and a suffused dark fuscous spot on the base of the costa. The plical and first discal stigmata are represented by a transverse dark fuscous blotch, the lower half enlarged and projecting anteriorly, the second discal by a dark fuscous transverse mark. The confluence of dark striation tends to form an undefined transverse fascia just beyond the second discal stigma and a streak along the termen, widest at the apex. The hindwings are dark grey.
