= Dichomeris coenulenta =

Scientific classification
- Kingdom: Animalia
- Phylum: Arthropoda
- Clade: Pancrustacea
- Class: Insecta
- Order: Lepidoptera
- Family: Gelechiidae
- Genus: Dichomeris
- Species: D. coenulenta

Binomial name
- Dichomeris coenulenta (Meyrick, 1927)

Synonyms
- Cymotricha coenulenta Meyrick, 1927; Trichotaphe coenulenta

Species of moth

Dichomeris coenulenta is a moth in the family Gelechiidae. It was described by Edward Meyrick in 1927. It is found in Zimbabwe.

The wingspan is about 20 mm. The forewings are light brownish ochreous almost wholly suffused with light grey and with a few scattered blackish scales. The base of the costa is suffused with dark grey. The stigmata are cloudy, formed of blackish irroration (sprinkles), the plical beneath the first discal, some blackish irroration around these and towards the dorsum beneath them, an additional obscure dot midway between the base and the first discal, second discal connected with the dorsum by an irregular bar of grey suffusion. There are cloudy dark grey marginal dots separated by pale brownish-ochreous spaces around the posterior part of the costa and termen, a narrow fascia of grey suffusion attenuated downwards preceding these on the termen. The hindwings are grey, rather thinly scaled in the disc and the veins suffused dark grey.
