= Dichomeris amblopis =

Scientific classification
- Domain: Eukaryota
- Kingdom: Animalia
- Phylum: Arthropoda
- Class: Insecta
- Order: Lepidoptera
- Family: Gelechiidae
- Genus: Dichomeris
- Species: D. amblopis

Binomial name
- Dichomeris amblopis (Janse, 1954)

Synonyms
- Daemonarcha amblopis Janse, 1954

Species of moth

Dichomeris amblopis is a moth in the family Gelechiidae. It was described by Anthonie Johannes Theodorus Janse in 1954. It is found in Namibia and Zimbabwe.
