= Anomologa demens =

Scientific classification
- Kingdom: Animalia
- Phylum: Arthropoda
- Class: Insecta
- Order: Lepidoptera
- Family: Gelechiidae
- Genus: Anomologa
- Species: A. demens

Binomial name
- Anomologa demens Meyrick, 1926

Species of moth

Anomologa demens is a species of moth in the family Gelechiidae. It was described by Edward Meyrick in 1926. It is found in South Africa.

The wingspan is about 21 mm. The forewings are purple-blackish. The hindwings are dark gray.
