= Dichomeris torrefacta =

Scientific classification
- Kingdom: Animalia
- Phylum: Arthropoda
- Clade: Pancrustacea
- Class: Insecta
- Order: Lepidoptera
- Family: Gelechiidae
- Genus: Dichomeris
- Species: D. torrefacta

Binomial name
- Dichomeris torrefacta (Meyrick, 1914)

Synonyms
- Brachmia torrefacta Meyrick, 1914; Catelaphris torrefacta

Species of moth

Dichomeris torrefacta is a moth in the family Gelechiidae. It was described by Edward Meyrick in 1914. It is found in South Africa.

The wingspan is 14–15 mm. The forewings are ochreous yellow suffused throughout with brownish ferruginous. The hindwings are grey.
