= Dichomeris trisignella =

Scientific classification
- Domain: Eukaryota
- Kingdom: Animalia
- Phylum: Arthropoda
- Class: Insecta
- Order: Lepidoptera
- Family: Gelechiidae
- Genus: Dichomeris
- Species: D. trisignella

Binomial name
- Dichomeris trisignella (Janse, 1960)

Synonyms
- Parabrachmia trisignella Janse, 1960

Species of moth

Dichomeris trisignella is a moth in the family Gelechiidae. It was described by Anthonie Johannes Theodorus Janse in 1960. It is found in South Africa.
