= Dichomeris xanthodeta =

Scientific classification
- Kingdom: Animalia
- Phylum: Arthropoda
- Class: Insecta
- Order: Lepidoptera
- Family: Gelechiidae
- Genus: Dichomeris
- Species: D. xanthodeta

Binomial name
- Dichomeris xanthodeta Meyrick, 1913

Species of moth

Dichomeris xanthodeta is a moth in the family Gelechiidae. It was described by Edward Meyrick in 1913. It is found in Mpumalanga, South Africa.

The wingspan is 16–17 mm. The forewings are lilac fuscous with the costa narrowly deep orange throughout and with a dark fuscous terminal line. The hindwings are grey.
