= Acutitornus liebenbergi =

Scientific classification
- Kingdom: Animalia
- Phylum: Arthropoda
- Clade: Pancrustacea
- Class: Insecta
- Order: Lepidoptera
- Family: Gelechiidae
- Genus: Acutitornus
- Species: A. liebenbergi

Binomial name
- Acutitornus liebenbergi Janse, 1963

Species of moth

Acutitornus liebenbergi is a species of moth in the family Gelechiidae. It was described by Anthonie Johannes Theodorus Janse in 1963. It is found in South Africa.
