= Dichomeris ligyra =

Scientific classification
- Kingdom: Animalia
- Phylum: Arthropoda
- Class: Insecta
- Order: Lepidoptera
- Family: Gelechiidae
- Genus: Dichomeris
- Species: D. ligyra

Binomial name
- Dichomeris ligyra (Meyrick, 1913)

Synonyms
- Trichotaphe ligyra Meyrick, 1913

Species of moth

Dichomeris ligyra is a species of moth in the family Gelechiidae. It was described by Edward Meyrick in 1913. It is found in Gauteng, South Africa.

The wingspan is about 11 mm. The forewings are bronzy fuscous with the costal edge dark fuscous. There is a more or less developed oblique dark fuscous streak from the costa near the base, reaching halfway across the wing and there is an irregular blackish-fuscous fascia beyond one-third, edged with pale yellowish, the anterior edge straight, the posterior convex, broadest in the middle, where it is centrally suffused with ground colour, hardly reaching the costa. There is an oblique blackish-fuscous fascia from the middle of the costa, edged with pale yellowish, centrally suffused with ground colour in the disc, reaching two-thirds of the way across the wing, its apex obliquely truncate. There is also a slightly incurved pale yellowish streak from three-fourths of the costa to the dorsum before the tornus, edged posteriorly by a blackish-fuscous streak. Some suffused dark fuscous dots are found around the posterior part of the costa and termen. The hindwings are grey, thinly scaled in the cell, the veins and margins suffused with dark fuscous.
