= Lasiarchis pycnodes =

Scientific classification
- Kingdom: Animalia
- Phylum: Arthropoda
- Clade: Pancrustacea
- Class: Insecta
- Order: Lepidoptera
- Family: Gelechiidae
- Genus: Lasiarchis
- Species: L. pycnodes

Binomial name
- Lasiarchis pycnodes (Meyrick, 1909)

Synonyms
- Nothris pycnodes Meyrick, 1909; Lasiarchis elaeoxyla Meyrick, 1937

Species of moth

Lasiarchis pycnodes is a moth in the family Gelechiidae. It was described by Edward Meyrick in 1909. It is found in Gauteng, South Africa.

The wingspan is 21–22 mm. The forewings are fuscous with an indistinct blackish dot beneath the costa near the base. The stigmata are blackish, partially edged with light greyish ochreous, the plical larger, obliquely before the first discal. The costa is somewhat suffused with pale greyish ochreous towards the middle and there is a suffused pale greyish-ochreous spot on the costa at about three-fourths, with faint traces of a curved transverse line rising from it. The hindwings are grey, becoming paler and tinged with whitish ochreous towards the base.
