= Mometa zemiodes =

Scientific classification
- Domain: Eukaryota
- Kingdom: Animalia
- Phylum: Arthropoda
- Class: Insecta
- Order: Lepidoptera
- Family: Gelechiidae
- Genus: Mometa
- Species: M. zemiodes

Binomial name
- Mometa zemiodes Durrant, 1914

Species of moth

Mometa zemiodes is a moth of the family Gelechiidae. It was described by John Hartley Durrant in 1914. It is found in Angola, the Democratic Republic of the Congo (Katanga, West Kasai), Mozambique, Nigeria, Somalia, South Africa and Zimbabwe.

The wingspan is 15–17 mm. The forewings are fuscous black, with conspicuous, sharply defined, yellowish-ochreous markings. There is a narrow fascia close to the base, a large round spot at the end of the cell, and a round costal spot on veins nine and ten. The hindwings are fuscous.

The larvae have been recorded feeding on the seeds of Thespesia danis, Dialium lacourtianum and Gossypium species.
