= Dichomeris oleata =

Scientific classification
- Kingdom: Animalia
- Phylum: Arthropoda
- Clade: Pancrustacea
- Class: Insecta
- Order: Lepidoptera
- Family: Gelechiidae
- Genus: Dichomeris
- Species: D. oleata

Binomial name
- Dichomeris oleata Meyrick, 1913

Species of moth

Dichomeris oleata is a moth in the family Gelechiidae. It was described by Edward Meyrick in 1913. It is found in Mpumalanga, South Africa.

The wingspan is 14–16 mm. The forewings are brownish ochreous, more or less irrorated (sprinkled) with fuscous and with the costal edge dark fuscous at the base and more or less suffused with dark fuscous towards the median third. Sometimes, there is a dark fuscous dot above the fold at one-fourth. The stigmata are dark fuscous, the plical slightly before the first discal, an additional dot close before and above the first discal, the second discal transverse, sometimes connected with the dorsum by a transverse patch of fuscous suffusion. There is also a narrow streak of dark fuscous suffusion along the termen. The hindwings are pale grey.
