= Dichomeris aplectodes =

Scientific classification
- Kingdom: Animalia
- Phylum: Arthropoda
- Clade: Pancrustacea
- Class: Insecta
- Order: Lepidoptera
- Family: Gelechiidae
- Genus: Dichomeris
- Species: D. aplectodes

Binomial name
- Dichomeris aplectodes (Janse, 1960)

Synonyms
- Cymatoplex aplectodes Janse, 1960; Cymatoplicella aplectodes

Species of moth

Dichomeris aplectodes is a moth in the family Gelechiidae. It was described by Anthonie Johannes Theodorus Janse in 1960. It is found in South Africa.
