= Dichomeris pleuropa =

Scientific classification
- Kingdom: Animalia
- Phylum: Arthropoda
- Class: Insecta
- Order: Lepidoptera
- Family: Gelechiidae
- Genus: Dichomeris
- Species: D. pleuropa

Binomial name
- Dichomeris pleuropa (Meyrick, 1921)

Synonyms
- Trichotaphe pleuropa Meyrick, 1921

Species of moth

Dichomeris pleuropa is a moth in the family Gelechiidae. It was described by Edward Meyrick in 1921. It is found in South Africa.

The wingspan is about 19 mm. The forewings are pale ochreous, the dorsal edge tinged with grey. The stigmata are moderate, blackish, the plical rather obliquely before the first discal, an additional dot midway between the first discal and the base. There is an inwards-oblique streak of blackish-grey suffusion from the dorsum beneath the second discal, angulated near the dorsum, included in a faint greyish slightly curved band crossing the wing behind the second discal. There is a marginal row of black dots around the apical part of the costa and termen to before the tornus. The hindwings are rather dark grey.
