= Parathectis farinata =

Scientific classification
- Kingdom: Animalia
- Phylum: Arthropoda
- Class: Insecta
- Order: Lepidoptera
- Family: Gelechiidae
- Genus: Parathectis
- Species: P. farinata

Binomial name
- Parathectis farinata (Meyrick, 1913)

Synonyms
- Epithectis farinata Meyrick, 1913

Species of moth

Parathectis farinata is a moth of the family Gelechiidae. It was described by Edward Meyrick in 1913. It is found in South Africa.

The wingspan is 12–13 mm. The forewings are pale whitish ochreous, irregularly irrorated (sprinkled) with dark fuscous and with a patch of dark fuscous suffusion on the basal portion of the costa. The stigmata are suffused with dark fuscous, the plical obliquely before the first discal. The hindwings are pale whitish ochreous.
