= Dichomeris excepta =

Scientific classification
- Kingdom: Animalia
- Phylum: Arthropoda
- Class: Insecta
- Order: Lepidoptera
- Family: Gelechiidae
- Genus: Dichomeris
- Species: D. excepta

Binomial name
- Dichomeris excepta (Meyrick, 1914)

Synonyms
- Trichotaphe excepta Meyrick, 1914

Species of moth

Dichomeris excepta is a moth in the family Gelechiidae. It was described by Edward Meyrick in 1914. It is found in Malawi and Zimbabwe.

The wingspan is about 10 mm. The forewings are light greyish ochreous with the costa slenderly whitish from the base to the apical patch. The plical and first discal stigmata are black, the plical slightly anterior, and with a small black dot in the disc midway between the plical and the base. There is also a fuscous apical patch, its anterior edge dark fuscous and limited by a hardly excurved whitish line from the costa before three-fourths to the dorsum before the tornus. The hindwings are pale grey.
