= Dichomeris inclusa =

Scientific classification
- Kingdom: Animalia
- Phylum: Arthropoda
- Clade: Pancrustacea
- Class: Insecta
- Order: Lepidoptera
- Family: Gelechiidae
- Genus: Dichomeris
- Species: D. inclusa

Binomial name
- Dichomeris inclusa (Meyrick, 1927)

Synonyms
- Cymotricha inclusa Meyrick, 1927; Trichotaphe inclusa

Species of moth

Dichomeris inclusa is a moth in the family Gelechiidae. It was described by Edward Meyrick in 1927. It is found in South Africa.

The wingspan is about 13 mm. The forewings are leaden grey with a blackish dot towards the costa near the base, finely whitish edged above. There is a narrow direct blackish finely whitish-edged fascia at one-third. There are two blackish dots on the end of the cell, the lower rather posterior. There is a slender transverse fascia of blackish irroration (sprinkling) at three-fourths, edged with ochreous-whitish suffusion anteriorly towards the costa. Beyond this are some scattered black scales and there are irregular marginal dots of black irroration around the posterior part of the costa and termen. The hindwings are rather dark grey.
