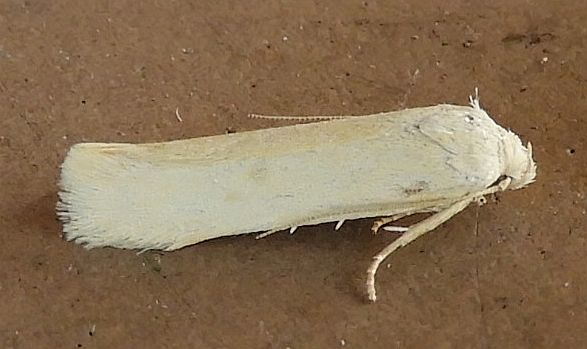

Scientific classification
- Kingdom: Animalia
- Phylum: Arthropoda
- Clade: Pancrustacea
- Class: Insecta
- Order: Lepidoptera
- Family: Gelechiidae
- Genus: Frumenta
- Species: F. nephelomicta

Binomial name
- Frumenta nephelomicta (Meyrick, 1930)

Synonyms
- Asapharcha nephelomicta Meyrick, 1930

= Frumenta nephelomicta =

Species of moth

Frumenta nephelomicta is a species of moth in the family Gelechiidae. It was described by Edward Meyrick in 1930. It is found in the south-western US, where it has been recorded from New Mexico and Texas.

The wingspan is about 24 mm.
