= Dichomeris externella =

Scientific classification
- Kingdom: Animalia
- Phylum: Arthropoda
- Clade: Pancrustacea
- Class: Insecta
- Order: Lepidoptera
- Family: Gelechiidae
- Genus: Dichomeris
- Species: D. externella

Binomial name
- Dichomeris externella (Zeller, 1852)

Synonyms
- Gelechia (Nothris) externella Zeller, 1852; Trichotaphe externella

Species of moth

Dichomeris externella is a moth in the family Gelechiidae. It was described by Philipp Christoph Zeller in 1852. It is found in South Africa and Zimbabwe.
