= Dichomeris stromatias =

Scientific classification
- Kingdom: Animalia
- Phylum: Arthropoda
- Class: Insecta
- Order: Lepidoptera
- Family: Gelechiidae
- Genus: Dichomeris
- Species: D. stromatias

Binomial name
- Dichomeris stromatias Meyrick, 1918

Species of moth

Dichomeris stromatias is a moth in the family Gelechiidae. It was described by Edward Meyrick in 1918. It is found in South Africa.

The wingspan is about 19 mm (0.75 in). The forewings are dull greyish crimson with the costal edge yellow ferruginous from near the base to near the apex. The stigmata are indicated by whitish dots, the second discal by two longitudinally placed, the plical rather obliquely before the first discal. The hindwings are grey, with the veins darker.
