= Parathectis sordidula =

Scientific classification
- Kingdom: Animalia
- Phylum: Arthropoda
- Clade: Pancrustacea
- Class: Insecta
- Order: Lepidoptera
- Family: Gelechiidae
- Genus: Parathectis
- Species: P. sordidula

Binomial name
- Parathectis sordidula (Meyrick, 1913)

Synonyms
- Epithectis sordidula Meyrick, 1913

Species of moth

Parathectis sordidula is a moth of the family Gelechiidae. It was described by Edward Meyrick in 1913. It is found in South Africa and Namibia.

The wingspan is 6–8 mm. The forewings are ochreous whitish, variably tinged, sprinkled, or irrorated with grey. There is a grey elongated dot on the fold at one-fourth. The stigmata are small and dark grey, with one or two blackish scales, the plical very obliquely beyond the first discal. The hindwings are grey.
