= Dichomeris reducta =

Scientific classification
- Domain: Eukaryota
- Kingdom: Animalia
- Phylum: Arthropoda
- Class: Insecta
- Order: Lepidoptera
- Family: Gelechiidae
- Genus: Dichomeris
- Species: D. reducta

Binomial name
- Dichomeris reducta (Janse, 1951)

Synonyms
- Holaxyra reducta Janse, 1951; Leuropalpa reducta

Species of moth

Dichomeris reducta is a moth in the family Gelechiidae. It was described by Anthonie Johannes Theodorus Janse in 1951. It is found in South Africa.
