= Dichomeris cyprophanes =

Scientific classification
- Kingdom: Animalia
- Phylum: Arthropoda
- Class: Insecta
- Order: Lepidoptera
- Family: Gelechiidae
- Genus: Dichomeris
- Species: D. cyprophanes

Binomial name
- Dichomeris cyprophanes (Meyrick, 1918)

Synonyms
- Daemonarcha cyprophanes Meyrick, 1918

Species of moth

Dichomeris cyprophanes is a moth belonging to the family Gelechiidae. It was described by Edward Meyrick in 1918. This species is found in the South African province of KwaZulu-Natal.

The wingspan is 14–15 mm. The forewings are deep blue purple, towards the apex and termen becoming bright coppery. There is a faint oblique coppery strigula on the costa at three-fourths. The hindwings are grey.
