= Aspades armatovalva =

Scientific classification
- Domain: Eukaryota
- Kingdom: Animalia
- Phylum: Arthropoda
- Class: Insecta
- Order: Lepidoptera
- Family: Gelechiidae
- Genus: Aspades
- Species: A. armatovalva

Binomial name
- Aspades armatovalva (Janse, 1963)

Synonyms
- Aspasiodes armatovalva Janse, 1963

Species of moth

Aspades armatovalva is a species of moth in the family Gelechiidae. It was described by Anthonie Johannes Theodorus Janse in 1963. It is found in Zimbabwe.
