= Dichomeris barathrodes =

Scientific classification
- Kingdom: Animalia
- Phylum: Arthropoda
- Class: Insecta
- Order: Lepidoptera
- Family: Gelechiidae
- Genus: Dichomeris
- Species: D. barathrodes

Binomial name
- Dichomeris barathrodes (Meyrick, 1909)

Synonyms
- Paristhmia barathrodes Meyrick, 1909

Species of moth

Dichomeris barathrodes is a moth in the family Gelechiidae. It was described by Edward Meyrick in 1909. It is found in Zimbabwe, Mozambique and Gauteng, South Africa.

The wingspan is about 12 mm (0.47 in). The forewings are whitish ochreous tinged with brownish and with a black dot on the base of the costa and one on the fold before one-fourth, as well as an oblong transverse blackish blotch in the disk before the middle representing the plical and first discal stigmata. The second discal stigma is black and there is an undefined fascia of light, fuscous suffusion just beyond this with the extremities blackish. There are also three or four undefined fuscous dots on the termen. The hindwings are grey.
