= Dichomeris impigra =

Scientific classification
- Kingdom: Animalia
- Phylum: Arthropoda
- Class: Insecta
- Order: Lepidoptera
- Family: Gelechiidae
- Genus: Dichomeris
- Species: D. impigra

Binomial name
- Dichomeris impigra Meyrick, 1913

Species of moth

Dichomeris impigra is a moth in the family Gelechiidae. It was described by Edward Meyrick in 1913. It is found in Mpumalanga, South Africa.

The wingspan is 15–17 mm. The forewings are ochreous, more or less sprinkled with fuscous except towards the costa anteriorly. The costal edge is black towards the base. The stigmata is black, the plical rather obliquely before the first discal. There is a moderate dark grey terminal fascia, sprinkled with black, the anterior edge slightly convex, suffused with black and preceded by a clear ochreous shade. The hindwings are dark grey.
