= Dichomeris condylodes =

Scientific classification
- Kingdom: Animalia
- Phylum: Arthropoda
- Class: Insecta
- Order: Lepidoptera
- Family: Gelechiidae
- Genus: Dichomeris
- Species: D. condylodes

Binomial name
- Dichomeris condylodes (Meyrick, 1921)

Synonyms
- Trichotaphe condylodes Meyrick, 1921

Species of moth

Dichomeris condylodes is a moth in the family Gelechiidae. It was described by Edward Meyrick in 1921. It is found in Zimbabwe.

The wingspan is about 14 mm. The forewings are ashy greyish fuscous with the extreme costal edge whitish ochreous from the base to two-thirds and a small black dot on the base of the costa. There is a small indistinct blackish dot in the disc midway between the base and the first discal stigma, the plical and the first discal stigma, each forming a blackish transverse mark and almost confluent, the plical hardly anterior, the second discal stigma represented only by three or four blackish scales. There is a small ochreous-whitish spot on the costa before three-fourths, the costa before it dark grey. There are also minute groups of two or three dark fuscous scales, each around the posterior part of the costa and termen. The hindwings are grey, with a blotch of fuscous somewhat modified scales extending over the dorsal three-fifths of the wing on the basal half, with an obscure prolongation in the disc posteriorly.
