= Lasiarchis hirsuta =

Scientific classification
- Domain: Eukaryota
- Kingdom: Animalia
- Phylum: Arthropoda
- Class: Insecta
- Order: Lepidoptera
- Family: Gelechiidae
- Genus: Lasiarchis
- Species: L. hirsuta

Binomial name
- Lasiarchis hirsuta Janse, 1958

Species of moth

Lasiarchis hirsuta is a moth in the family Gelechiidae. It was described by Anthonie Johannes Theodorus Janse in 1958. It is found in Zimbabwe.
