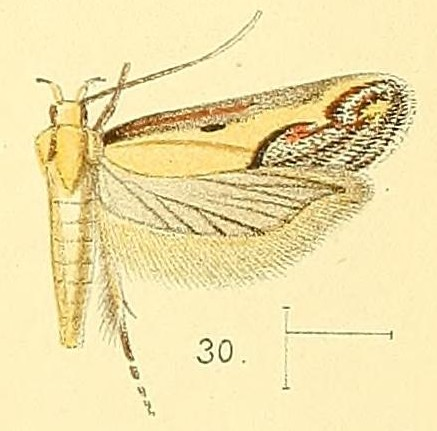

Scientific classification
- Domain: Eukaryota
- Kingdom: Animalia
- Phylum: Arthropoda
- Class: Insecta
- Order: Lepidoptera
- Family: Gelechiidae
- Genus: Aspades
- Species: A. hutchinsonella

Binomial name
- Aspades hutchinsonella (Walsingham, 1891)

Synonyms
- Gelechia hutchinsonella Walsingham, 1891

= Aspades hutchinsonella =

Species of moth

Aspades hutchinsonella is a species of moth in the family Gelechiidae. It was described by Thomas de Grey, 6th Baron Walsingham, in 1891. It is found in Namibia, South Africa and Zimbabwe.

The wingspan is 10–14 mm. The forewings are stramineous, with a brownish fuscous spot at the extreme base of the costa, then shaded with greyish fuscous along the costal margin nearly to the commencement of the costo-apical cilia. Along the centre of this costal shade is a line of chestnut scales reaching to half the length of the wing. Contiguous to the lower edge of the costal shade, but before the middle, is a distinct black spot. A conspicuous greyish fuscous patch lies on the dorsal margin contiguous to the anal angle, its rounded inner edge narrowly margined by a line of black scales, its outer extremity touched with chestnut. This patch is connected at the anal angle with a shade of the same colour, which follows the apical margin to the apex, interrupted only by a small marginal spot of the pale stramineous ground colour, immediately below the apex, by which the darker shade appears to be deflected inwards. The hindwings are grey.
