= Scrobipalpa geomicta =

Scientific classification
- Kingdom: Animalia
- Phylum: Arthropoda
- Class: Insecta
- Order: Lepidoptera
- Family: Gelechiidae
- Genus: Scrobipalpa
- Species: S. geomicta

Binomial name
- Scrobipalpa geomicta (Meyrick, 1918)

Synonyms
- Phthorimaea geomicta Meyrick, 1918

Species of moth

Scrobipalpa geomicta is a moth in the family Gelechiidae. It was described by Edward Meyrick in 1918. It is found in South Africa.

The wingspan is about 12 mm (0.47 in). The forewings are brown sprinkled with fuscous, with some whitish scales and some darker fuscous suffusion towards the base, and forming a patch in the disc at one-third and a small blackish spot on the costa at one-fourth. The discal stigmata are small, black and approximated. The hindwings are pale bluish grey.
