= Ptychovalva obruta =

Scientific classification
- Domain: Eukaryota
- Kingdom: Animalia
- Phylum: Arthropoda
- Class: Insecta
- Order: Lepidoptera
- Family: Gelechiidae
- Genus: Ptychovalva
- Species: P. obruta

Binomial name
- Ptychovalva obruta (Meyrick, 1921)

Synonyms
- Gelechia obruta Meyrick, 1921; Gelechia galatea Meyrick, 1926

Species of moth

Ptychovalva obruta is a moth in the family Gelechiidae. It was described by Edward Meyrick in 1921. It is found in South Africa and Zimbabwe.
