= Dichomeris famosa =

Scientific classification
- Kingdom: Animalia
- Phylum: Arthropoda
- Class: Insecta
- Order: Lepidoptera
- Family: Gelechiidae
- Genus: Dichomeris
- Species: D. famosa

Binomial name
- Dichomeris famosa (Meyrick, 1914)

Synonyms
- Trichotaphe famosa Meyrick, 1914

Species of moth

Dichomeris famosa is a moth in the family Gelechiidae. It was described by Edward Meyrick in 1914. It is found in the Democratic Republic of the Congo (Kasaï-Oriental), Malawi and Zimbabwe.

The wingspan is 14–16 mm. The forewings are dark purplish ashy fuscous. The stigmata is very obscure, blackish, with the discal approximated, the plical beneath the first discal, the second discal transverse. The hindwings are grey.
