= Dichomeris latipalpis =

Scientific classification
- Domain: Eukaryota
- Kingdom: Animalia
- Phylum: Arthropoda
- Class: Insecta
- Order: Lepidoptera
- Family: Gelechiidae
- Genus: Dichomeris
- Species: D. latipalpis

Binomial name
- Dichomeris latipalpis (Walsingham, 1881)

Synonyms
- Ypsolophus latipalpis Walsingham, 1881; Machlotricha latipalpis; Machlotricha caeca Meyrick, 1912

Species of moth

Dichomeris latipalpis is a moth in the family Gelechiidae. It was described by Thomas de Grey in 1881. It is found in South Africa.

The wingspan is about 14mm. The forewings are brownish fuscous, with a very faint plum-coloured gloss and speckled about the base of the fold and costal margin with whitish grey scales. These are also found about the costal margin on the apical fourth of the wing. The hindwings are shining pale grey, with a very faint purplish tinge.
