= Scrobipalpa phalacrodes =

Scientific classification
- Kingdom: Animalia
- Phylum: Arthropoda
- Clade: Pancrustacea
- Class: Insecta
- Order: Lepidoptera
- Family: Gelechiidae
- Genus: Scrobipalpa
- Species: S. phalacrodes

Binomial name
- Scrobipalpa phalacrodes (Meyrick, 1913)

Synonyms
- Gnorimoschema phalacrodes Meyrick, 1913

Species of moth

Scrobipalpa phalacrodes is a moth in the family Gelechiidae. It was described by Edward Meyrick in 1913. It is found in South Africa.

The wingspan is 13–14 mm (0.51–0.55 in). The forewings are fuscous tinged with grey and brownish and sprinkled with black. The basal area is spotted with black, with an irregular ochreous-whitish patch towards the costa near the base. The stigmata are rather large, irregular and black, the plical slightly before the first discal, the median area of the disc between the stigmata and around the first discal largely occupied by a broad patch of ochreous-whitish suffusion. There is an irregular rather thick sinuate transverse ochreous-whitish streak at about three-fourths and several black dots around the apical part of the costa and termen. The hindwings are grey, paler and semi-transparent anteriorly.
