= Scrobipalpa trychnophylla =

Scientific classification
- Domain: Eukaryota
- Kingdom: Animalia
- Phylum: Arthropoda
- Class: Insecta
- Order: Lepidoptera
- Family: Gelechiidae
- Genus: Scrobipalpa
- Species: S. trychnophylla

Binomial name
- Scrobipalpa trychnophylla Janse, 1960

Species of moth

Scrobipalpa trychnophylla is a moth in the family Gelechiidae. It was described by Anthonie Johannes Theodorus Janse in 1960. It is found in Zambia.
