= Dichomeris rubidula =

Scientific classification
- Kingdom: Animalia
- Phylum: Arthropoda
- Class: Insecta
- Order: Lepidoptera
- Family: Gelechiidae
- Genus: Dichomeris
- Species: D. rubidula

Binomial name
- Dichomeris rubidula (Meyrick, 1913)

Synonyms
- Trichotaphe rubidula Meyrick, 1913

Species of moth

Dichomeris rubidula is a moth in the family Gelechiidae. It was described by Edward Meyrick, an amateur entomologist, in 1913. It is found in Mpumalanga, South Africa.

== Description ==
The wingspan of D. rubidula is about 17 mm. The forewings are fuscous sprinkled with reddish brown, with a few black scales. The costal edge is whitish ochreous from near the base to beyond the middle. The stigmata is dark fuscous, the plical is beneath the first discal. There is an indistinct pale greyish-ochreous nearly straight transverse shade at three-fourths, slightly indented above the middle. The hindwings are grey.
