= Acutitornus kalahariensis =

Scientific classification
- Kingdom: Animalia
- Phylum: Arthropoda
- Clade: Pancrustacea
- Class: Insecta
- Order: Lepidoptera
- Family: Gelechiidae
- Genus: Acutitornus
- Species: A. kalahariensis

Binomial name
- Acutitornus kalahariensis Janse, 1958

Species of moth

Acutitornus kalahariensis is a species of moth in the family Gelechiidae that's found in South Africa. It was described by Anthonie Johannes Theodorus Janse in 1958.
