= Dichomeris conclusa =

Scientific classification
- Kingdom: Animalia
- Phylum: Arthropoda
- Class: Insecta
- Order: Lepidoptera
- Family: Gelechiidae
- Genus: Dichomeris
- Species: D. conclusa

Binomial name
- Dichomeris conclusa (Meyrick, 1918)

Synonyms
- Trichotaphe conclusa Meyrick, 1918; Eporgastis conclusa

Species of moth

Dichomeris conclusa is a moth in the family Gelechiidae. It was described by Edward Meyrick in 1918. It is found in South Africa.

The wingspan is about 13 mm (0.51 in). The forewings are deep yellow ochreous, slightly ferruginous tinged, and with a slight violet gloss. The costal edge is blackish towards the base and the plical and first discal stigmata are small, blackish, the plical slightly posterior. There is a narrow blackish terminal fascia from the apex to the tornus, pointed beneath, with black dots on the terminal edge. The hindwings are rather dark grey.
