= Blastovalva paltobola =

Scientific classification
- Kingdom: Animalia
- Phylum: Arthropoda
- Class: Insecta
- Order: Lepidoptera
- Family: Gelechiidae
- Genus: Blastovalva
- Species: B. paltobola

Binomial name
- Blastovalva paltobola (Meyrick, 1921)

Synonyms
- Thiotricha paltobola Meyrick, 1921

Species of moth

Blastovalva paltobola is a moth of the family Gelechiidae. It was described by Edward Meyrick in 1921. It is found in South Africa.

The wingspan is about 9 mm. The forewings are shining white with the costal edge dark fuscous towards the base and with a very oblique elongate dark fuscous mark towards the dorsum before the middle. There is a dark fuscous line running from the disc beyond the middle to the apical patch, where it meets a similar shorter line from an irregular suffused spot on the tornus. A patch is found along the apical fourth of the costa, consisting of three oblique wedge-shaped dark brown spots separated by white strigulae, the second strigula limiting a blackish apical dot, and preceded by two minute linear black dots surrounded by pale ochreous before the termen. The hindwings are grey.
