= Aeolotrocha delograpta =

Scientific classification
- Domain: Eukaryota
- Kingdom: Animalia
- Phylum: Arthropoda
- Class: Insecta
- Order: Lepidoptera
- Family: Gelechiidae
- Genus: Aeolotrocha
- Species: A. delograpta

Binomial name
- Aeolotrocha delograpta Janse, 1960

Species of moth

Aeolotrocha delograpta is a species of moth in the family Gelechiidae. It was described by Anthonie Johannes Theodorus Janse in 1960. It is found in South Africa.
