= Khoisa glauca =

Scientific classification
- Kingdom: Animalia
- Phylum: Arthropoda
- Clade: Pancrustacea
- Class: Insecta
- Order: Lepidoptera
- Family: Gelechiidae
- Genus: Khoisa
- Species: K. glauca

Binomial name
- Khoisa glauca (Janse, 1960)

Synonyms
- Melitoxoides glauca Janse, 1960

Species of moth

Khoisa glauca is a moth in the family Gelechiidae. It was described by Anthonie Johannes Theodorus Janse in 1960. It is found in South Africa.
