= Dichomeris xanthophylla =

Scientific classification
- Domain: Eukaryota
- Kingdom: Animalia
- Phylum: Arthropoda
- Class: Insecta
- Order: Lepidoptera
- Family: Gelechiidae
- Genus: Dichomeris
- Species: D. xanthophylla

Binomial name
- Dichomeris xanthophylla (Janse, 1963)

Synonyms
- Zalithea xanthophylla Janse, 1963; Zalithia xanthophylla

Species of moth

Dichomeris xanthophylla is a moth in the family Gelechiidae. It was described by Anthonie Johannes Theodorus Janse in 1963. It is found in South Africa.
