= Acutitornus munda =

Scientific classification
- Domain: Eukaryota
- Kingdom: Animalia
- Phylum: Arthropoda
- Class: Insecta
- Order: Lepidoptera
- Family: Gelechiidae
- Genus: Acutitornus
- Species: A. munda

Binomial name
- Acutitornus munda Janse, 1951

Species of moth

Acutitornus munda is a species of moth in the family Gelechiidae. It was described by Anthonie Johannes Theodorus Janse in 1951. It is found in South Africa and Namibia.
