= Khoisa panaula =

Scientific classification
- Kingdom: Animalia
- Phylum: Arthropoda
- Class: Insecta
- Order: Lepidoptera
- Family: Gelechiidae
- Genus: Khoisa
- Species: K. panaula

Binomial name
- Khoisa panaula (Meyrick, 1909)

Synonyms
- Gelechia panaula Meyrick, 1909; Gelechia eusebasta Meyrick, 1926

Species of moth

Khoisa panaula is a moth in the family Gelechiidae. It was described by Edward Meyrick in 1909. It is found in South Africa.

The wingspan is about 18 mm. The forewings are whitish ochreous tinged with yellowish and mixed with pale ochreous brownish. The costa, dorsum, and all veins are marked by fine white lines and there is some whitish subdorsal suffusion. The discal stigmata are small and blackish, with the plical represented by a very fine black linear mark obliquely before the first discal. The hindwings are whitish.
