= Ptychovalva trigella =

Scientific classification
- Kingdom: Animalia
- Phylum: Arthropoda
- Clade: Pancrustacea
- Class: Insecta
- Order: Lepidoptera
- Family: Gelechiidae
- Genus: Ptychovalva
- Species: P. trigella

Binomial name
- Ptychovalva trigella (Zeller, 1852)

Synonyms
- Gelechia (Brachmia) trigella Zeller, 1852

Species of moth

Ptychovalva trigella is a moth in the family Gelechiidae. It was described by Philipp Christoph Zeller in 1852. It is found in South Africa.
