= Dichomeris fluitans =

Scientific classification
- Kingdom: Animalia
- Phylum: Arthropoda
- Class: Insecta
- Order: Lepidoptera
- Family: Gelechiidae
- Genus: Dichomeris
- Species: D. fluitans

Binomial name
- Dichomeris fluitans Meyrick, 1920

Species of moth

Dichomeris fluitans is a moth in the family Gelechiidae. It was described by Edward Meyrick in 1920. It is found in KwaZulu-Natal, South Africa.

The wingspan is about 16 mm. The forewings are light ochreous yellowish, the dorsal half suffused with brownish-ochreous and with a very small dark fuscous spot on the base of the costa. The discal stigmata are small, blackish, with an additional dot halfway between the first discal and the base. There is an apical spot of dark fuscous suffusion. The hindwings are iridescent grey.
