= Lanceopenna prominula =

Scientific classification
- Kingdom: Animalia
- Phylum: Arthropoda
- Class: Insecta
- Order: Lepidoptera
- Family: Gelechiidae
- Genus: Lanceopenna
- Species: L. prominula

Binomial name
- Lanceopenna prominula (Meyrick, 1913)

Synonyms
- Aristotelia prominula Meyrick, 1913

Species of moth

Lanceopenna prominula is a moth in the family Gelechiidae. It was described by Edward Meyrick in 1913. It is found in the South African provinces of Mpumalanga, KwaZulu-Natal, Gauteng and Limpopo.

The wingspan is 8–9 mm. The forewings are light ochreous brown, with a few scattered black scales and a streak of blackish suffusion along the costa throughout, becoming very slender towards the base, in the middle forming a triangular prominence. The plical and second discal stigmata are small and black and there are some black dots along the posterior part of the costa and termen. The hindwings are rather dark grey.
