= Dichomeris cymotrocha =

Scientific classification
- Kingdom: Animalia
- Phylum: Arthropoda
- Class: Insecta
- Order: Lepidoptera
- Family: Gelechiidae
- Genus: Dichomeris
- Species: D. cymotrocha

Binomial name
- Dichomeris cymotrocha (Meyrick, 1913)

Synonyms
- Nothris cymotrocha Meyrick, 1913; Acribologa cymotrocha

Species of moth

Dichomeris cymotrocha is a species of moth in the family Gelechiidae. It was described by Edward Meyrick in 1913. It is found in South Africa.

The wingspan is 12–13 mm. The forewings are pale yellow ochreous, with silvery iridescence. The basal fourth of the costa has small black marks and there is a dark fuscous streak along the costa from one-fourth to three-fourths, marked with one or two pale strigulae before the middle, and triangularly expanded beyond the middle. There is a broad dark fuscous streak along the dorsum from the base to the tornus, the upper edge forming two rounded undulations which reach halfway across the wing, the crest of the first is suffused with blackish. There are also some scattered fuscous scales and slight suffusion in the disc. The second discal stigma is small, black and there is a rather thick dark fuscous streak along the termen from the apex to near the tornus, edged anteriorly with some blackish scales. The hindwings are grey, paler and thinly scaled anteriorly.
