= Dichomeris physeta =

Scientific classification
- Kingdom: Animalia
- Phylum: Arthropoda
- Class: Insecta
- Order: Lepidoptera
- Family: Gelechiidae
- Genus: Dichomeris
- Species: D. physeta

Binomial name
- Dichomeris physeta (Meyrick, 1913)

Synonyms
- Trichotaphe physeta Meyrick, 1913

Species of moth

Dichomeris physeta is a moth in the family Gelechiidae. It was described by Edward Meyrick in 1913. It is found in South Africa and Zimbabwe.

The wingspan is 14–16 mm. The forewings are dark purplish fuscous. The stigmata are indistinct, cloudy, blackish, the plical hardly before the first discal. There are indistinct blackish dots around the posterior part of the costa and termen. The hindwings are roughly hairy on the dorsal two-thirds from the base to beyond the middle. They are dark fuscous.
