= Dichomeris antizyga =

Scientific classification
- Kingdom: Animalia
- Phylum: Arthropoda
- Class: Insecta
- Order: Lepidoptera
- Family: Gelechiidae
- Genus: Dichomeris
- Species: D. antizyga

Binomial name
- Dichomeris antizyga Meyrick, 1913

Species of moth

Dichomeris antizyga is a species of moth in the family Gelechiidae. It was described by Edward Meyrick in 1913. It is found in Namibia and the South African provinces of Mpumalanga and Gauteng.

The wingspan is 13–14 mm. The forewings are yellow ochreous with the base of the costa dark fuscous. There is a small blackish dot in the disc at one-fourth. The stigmata are moderate, black, the plical slightly beyond the first discal, the second discal connected with the dorsum by some pale greyish suffusion. There is a short blackish-grey streak from the apex along the upper part of the termen. The hindwings are light grey.
