= Lanceopenna pentastigma =

Scientific classification
- Domain: Eukaryota
- Kingdom: Animalia
- Phylum: Arthropoda
- Class: Insecta
- Order: Lepidoptera
- Family: Gelechiidae
- Genus: Lanceopenna
- Species: L. pentastigma

Binomial name
- Lanceopenna pentastigma Janse, 1960

Synonyms
- Aphanostola pentastigma (Janse, 1960)

Species of moth

Lanceopenna pentastigma is a moth in the family Gelechiidae. It was described by Anthonie Johannes Theodorus Janse in 1960. It is found in South Africa and Zimbabwe.
