= Dichomeris ventosa =

Scientific classification
- Kingdom: Animalia
- Phylum: Arthropoda
- Class: Insecta
- Order: Lepidoptera
- Family: Gelechiidae
- Genus: Dichomeris
- Species: D. ventosa

Binomial name
- Dichomeris ventosa Meyrick, 1913

Species of moth

Dichomeris ventosa is a species of moth in the family Gelechiidae. It was described by Edward Meyrick in 1913. It is found in Mpumalanga, South Africa.

The wingspan is 12–14 mm. The forewings are fuscous whitish, irregularly mixed with dark fuscous except towards the anterior half of the costa. There is a suffused dark fuscous spot on the base of the costa and a flattened-triangular suffused dark fuscous patch on the costa beyond the middle. The stigmata is blackish, the first discal largest, the plical beneath the first discal. The dark fuscous suffusion sometimes forms an irregular patch in the disc before these. There is also a rather narrow suffused dark fuscous terminal fascia. The hindwings are light grey.
