= Proselotis strictula =

Scientific classification
- Kingdom: Animalia
- Phylum: Arthropoda
- Class: Insecta
- Order: Lepidoptera
- Family: Gelechiidae
- Genus: Proselotis
- Species: P. strictula

Binomial name
- Proselotis strictula (Meyrick, 1937)

Synonyms
- Metzneria strictula Meyrick, 1937

Species of moth

Proselotis strictula is a moth of the family Gelechiidae. It was described by Edward Meyrick in 1937. It is found in South Africa, where it has been recorded from the Eastern Cape.
