= Dichomeris ochroxesta =

Scientific classification
- Kingdom: Animalia
- Phylum: Arthropoda
- Class: Insecta
- Order: Lepidoptera
- Family: Gelechiidae
- Genus: Dichomeris
- Species: D. ochroxesta

Binomial name
- Dichomeris ochroxesta (Meyrick, 1921)

Synonyms
- Trichotaphe ochroxesta Meyrick, 1921

Species of moth

Dichomeris ochroxesta is a moth in the family Gelechiidae. It was described by Edward Meyrick in 1921. It is found in South Africa.

The wingspan is about 17 mm. The forewings are yellow ochreous, somewhat paler towards the costa anteriorly. The hindwings are grey.
