= Dichomeris claviculata =

Scientific classification
- Kingdom: Animalia
- Phylum: Arthropoda
- Class: Insecta
- Order: Lepidoptera
- Family: Gelechiidae
- Genus: Dichomeris
- Species: D. claviculata

Binomial name
- Dichomeris claviculata (Meyrick, 1909)

Synonyms
- Trichotaphe claviculata Meyrick, 1909

Species of moth

Dichomeris claviculata is a moth in the family Gelechiidae. It was described by Edward Meyrick in 1909. It is found in Mozambique and Gauteng, South Africa.

The wingspan is about 16 mm. The forewings are glossy fuscous grey, sprinkled with black, especially towards the margins. The costal edge is whitish ochreous on the anterior half, with a black basal dot. There is a slightly curved slender black bar in the disk at two-fifths representing the plical and first discal stigmata. A very small whitish-ochreous spot is found on the costa at two-thirds. The hindwings are grey.

The larvae feed on Combretum species.
