= Araeovalva minor =

Scientific classification
- Domain: Eukaryota
- Kingdom: Animalia
- Phylum: Arthropoda
- Class: Insecta
- Order: Lepidoptera
- Family: Gelechiidae
- Genus: Araeovalva
- Species: A. minor

Binomial name
- Araeovalva minor Janse, 1960

Species of moth

Araeovalva minor is a moth in the family Gelechiidae. It is found in South Africa.
