= Anomologa dispulsa =

Scientific classification
- Domain: Eukaryota
- Kingdom: Animalia
- Phylum: Arthropoda
- Class: Insecta
- Order: Lepidoptera
- Family: Gelechiidae
- Genus: Anomologa
- Species: A. dispulsa

Binomial name
- Anomologa dispulsa Meyrick, 1926

Species of insect

Anomologa dispulsa is a species of moth in the family Gelechiidae. It was described by Edward Meyrick in 1926. It is found in South Africa.

The wingspan is about 23 mm. The forewings are white, with scattered black scales. The markings are irregular, grey suffusedly irrorated (speckled) black. There is a blotch on the costa almost at the base reaching half across the wing and a spot on the costa before the middle, as well as one beneath this in the disc connected anteriorly with another towards the dorsum. There is also a blotch on the costa at about three-fourths, with some irregular irroration beneath this towards the termen. There is an apical spot, and a slight irregular terminal streak. The hindwings are grey, the dorsal area partially suffused ochreous-whitish.
