= Dichomeris ironica =

Scientific classification
- Kingdom: Animalia
- Phylum: Arthropoda
- Class: Insecta
- Order: Lepidoptera
- Family: Gelechiidae
- Genus: Dichomeris
- Species: D. ironica

Binomial name
- Dichomeris ironica (Meyrick, 1909)

Synonyms
- Trichotaphe ironica Meyrick, 1909

Species of moth

Dichomeris ironica is a moth in the family Gelechiidae. It was described by Edward Meyrick in 1909. It is found in Limpopo, South Africa.

The wingspan is about 15 mm. The forewings are dark purplish fuscous. The stigmata cloudy, blackish, with the plical beneath the first discal. There is a similar less distinct spot midway between the first discal and the base and a cloudy pale ochreous dot on the costa at three-fourths. Some blackish lunate marks are found on the termen. The hindwings are rather dark grey.
