= Lanceopenna pseudogaleotis =

Scientific classification
- Domain: Eukaryota
- Kingdom: Animalia
- Phylum: Arthropoda
- Class: Insecta
- Order: Lepidoptera
- Family: Gelechiidae
- Genus: Lanceopenna
- Species: L. pseudogaleotis

Binomial name
- Lanceopenna pseudogaleotis Janse, 1950

Species of moth

Lanceopenna pseudogaleotis is a moth in the family Gelechiidae. It was described by Anthonie Johannes Theodorus Janse in 1950. It is found in the South African province of Gauteng.
