= Aeolotrocha paroptila =

Scientific classification
- Kingdom: Animalia
- Phylum: Arthropoda
- Clade: Pancrustacea
- Class: Insecta
- Order: Lepidoptera
- Family: Gelechiidae
- Genus: Aeolotrocha
- Species: A. paroptila

Binomial name
- Aeolotrocha paroptila Janse, 1960

Species of moth

Aeolotrocha paroptila is a species of moth in the family Gelechiidae. It was described by Anthonie Johannes Theodorus Janse in 1960. It is found in Mozambique and South Africa.
