= Holaxyra picrophanes =

Scientific classification
- Kingdom: Animalia
- Phylum: Arthropoda
- Class: Insecta
- Order: Lepidoptera
- Family: Gelechiidae
- Genus: Holaxyra
- Species: H. picrophanes

Binomial name
- Holaxyra picrophanes (Meyrick, 1913)

Synonyms
- Dichomeris picrophanes Meyrick, 1913

Species of moth

Holaxyra picrophanes is a moth in the family Gelechiidae. It was described by Edward Meyrick in 1913. It is found in South Africa.

The wingspan is about 15 mm. The forewings are silvery white, the dorsal half tinged and sprinkled with pale fuscous. There is a moderately broad dark fuscous median longitudinal streak from the base to the apex, with the lower edge somewhat suffused. The hindwings are whitish grey.
