= Dichomeris festa =

Scientific classification
- Kingdom: Animalia
- Phylum: Arthropoda
- Class: Insecta
- Order: Lepidoptera
- Family: Gelechiidae
- Genus: Dichomeris
- Species: D. festa

Binomial name
- Dichomeris festa (Meyrick, 1921)

Synonyms
- Iochares festa Meyrick, 1921

Species of moth

Dichomeris festa is a moth in the family Gelechiidae. It was described by Edward Meyrick in 1921. It is found in South Africa.

The wingspan is about 17 mm. The forewings are whitish ochreous, the veins irregularly lined or streaked with deep ferruginous and the dorsal area suffused with ferruginous, as well as with some ferruginous suffusion towards the costa posteriorly, and beyond the cell, extending beneath vein 8 to the apex. The discal stigmata is represented by narrow elongate very oblique deep ferruginous spots. The hindwings are ochreous tinged with fuscous.
