= Dichomeris plumbosa =

Scientific classification
- Kingdom: Animalia
- Phylum: Arthropoda
- Clade: Pancrustacea
- Class: Insecta
- Order: Lepidoptera
- Family: Gelechiidae
- Genus: Dichomeris
- Species: D. plumbosa

Binomial name
- Dichomeris plumbosa (Meyrick, 1913)

Synonyms
- Trichotaphe plumbosa Meyrick, 1913

Species of moth

Dichomeris plumbosa is a moth in the family Gelechiidae. It was described by Edward Meyrick in 1913. It is found in Mpumalanga, South Africa.

The wingspan is 17–18 mm (0.67–0.71 in). The forewings are rather dark slaty fuscous, with a few scattered black scales and a cloudy dark fuscous transverse dot above the fold at one-fourth. The stigmata are cloudy, dark fuscous, the plical somewhat obliquely before the first discal. There is also a whitish dot on the costa at two-thirds, where a very faint pale slightly curved shade crosses the wing. Some black dots are found around the posterior part of the costa and termen. The hindwings are rather dark grey.
