= Dichomeris oenombra =

Scientific classification
- Kingdom: Animalia
- Phylum: Arthropoda
- Class: Insecta
- Order: Lepidoptera
- Family: Gelechiidae
- Genus: Dichomeris
- Species: D. oenombra

Binomial name
- Dichomeris oenombra (Meyrick, 1914)

Synonyms
- Trichotaphe oenombra Meyrick, 1914

Species of moth

Dichomeris oenombra is a moth in the family Gelechiidae. It was described by Edward Meyrick in 1914. It is found in Malawi and South Africa.

== Description ==
The wingspan is about 20 mm. The forewings are brown, sprinkled with dark purplish posteriorly, paler and ochreous tinged on the costa towards the middle and with a dark fuscous mark along the costa at the base. The stigmata is cloudy, dark fuscous, the plical is rather obliquely before the first discal, and with an additional spot midway between the first discal and the base. A cloudy dark grey streak is found along the termen, which is widest at the apex. There are also some ill-defined dark fuscous dots around the posterior part of the costa and termen. The hindwings are grey.
