= Dichomeris opsorrhoa =

Scientific classification
- Kingdom: Animalia
- Phylum: Arthropoda
- Class: Insecta
- Order: Lepidoptera
- Family: Gelechiidae
- Genus: Dichomeris
- Species: D. opsorrhoa

Binomial name
- Dichomeris opsorrhoa (Meyrick, 1929)

Synonyms
- Trichotaphe opsorrhoa Meyrick, 1929

Species of moth

Dichomeris opsorrhoa is a moth in the family Gelechiidae. It was described by Edward Meyrick in 1929. It is found in South Africa.

The wingspan is 15–16 mm.
