= Dichomeris cotifera =

Scientific classification
- Kingdom: Animalia
- Phylum: Arthropoda
- Class: Insecta
- Order: Lepidoptera
- Family: Gelechiidae
- Genus: Dichomeris
- Species: D. cotifera

Binomial name
- Dichomeris cotifera Meyrick, 1913

Species of moth

Dichomeris cotifera is a moth in the family Gelechiidae. It was described by Edward Meyrick in 1913. It is found in Mpumalanga, South Africa.

The wingspan is about 15 mm. The forewings are light ochreous yellowish with the costal edge suffused with dark grey from the base to two-thirds and with a dark purplish-grey dorsal band from the base to the termen, streaked with blackish on the veins, occupying about half of the wing, broadest posteriorly and reaching the apex, the upper portion suffused with dark brown towards the base and posteriorly, the upper edge forming a triangular projection before the middle of the wing, beyond this with an excision containing a spot of brown suffusion. There are some scattered black scales and brownish suffusion on the veins on the costal half of the wing posteriorly. The hindwings are grey.
