= Encolpotis xanthoria =

Scientific classification
- Domain: Eukaryota
- Kingdom: Animalia
- Phylum: Arthropoda
- Class: Insecta
- Order: Lepidoptera
- Family: Gelechiidae
- Genus: Encolpotis
- Species: E. xanthoria

Binomial name
- Encolpotis xanthoria Meyrick, 1909

Species of moth

Encolpotis xanthoria is a moth in the family Gelechiidae. It was described by Edward Meyrick in 1909. It is found in Kenya, Malawi and the South African provinces of Gauteng and Western Cape.

The wingspan is 15–18 mm. The forewings are ferruginous brown, with a prismatic-bluish gloss, darkest towards the costa. The stigmata are represented by spots of dark fuscous suffusion, the discal rather approximated, the plical before the first discal. There is a streak of dark fuscous suffusion along the termen. The hindwings are pale whitish ochreous.

The larvae feed on Icerya and Coffea species, as well as Monanthotaxis parvifolia and Agelanthus sansibarensis.
