= Dichomeris aestuosa =

Scientific classification
- Kingdom: Animalia
- Phylum: Arthropoda
- Class: Insecta
- Order: Lepidoptera
- Family: Gelechiidae
- Genus: Dichomeris
- Species: D. aestuosa

Binomial name
- Dichomeris aestuosa (Meyrick, 1913)

Synonyms
- Homaloxestis aestuosa Meyrick, 1913; Cymatoplicella aestuosa

Species of moth

Dichomeris aestuosa is a moth in the family Gelechiidae. It was described by Edward Meyrick in 1913. It is found in South Africa and Zimbabwe.

The wingspan is 8–11 mm. The forewings are dark fuscous, irrorated (sprinkled) with whitish. The stigmata are very indistinct, cloudy and dark fuscous, the plical obliquely before the first discal. There is a nearly straight or slightly curved ochreous-whitish transverse streak from two-thirds of the costa to the dorsum before the tornus, sometimes produced anteriorly along the costa. The apical area beyond this is darker, with some undefined blackish marginal dots. The hindwings are grey.
