= Dichomeris turgida =

Scientific classification
- Kingdom: Animalia
- Phylum: Arthropoda
- Class: Insecta
- Order: Lepidoptera
- Family: Gelechiidae
- Genus: Dichomeris
- Species: D. turgida

Binomial name
- Dichomeris turgida (Meyrick, 1918)

Synonyms
- Trichotaphe turgida Meyrick, 1918; Musurga turgida

Species of moth

Dichomeris turgida is a moth in the family Gelechiidae. It was described by Edward Meyrick in 1918. It is found in South Africa.

The wingspan is about 18 mm (0.71 in). The forewings are whitish ochreous with a small black mark on the base of the costa. The stigmata are small, dark fuscous, the first discal represented by a short linear dash, the plical slightly beyond this. The costa is slenderly dark fuscous from two-fifths to the apex, cut by a whitish line which runs from two-thirds of the costa to near the apex and then strongly curved to the tornus, and posteriorly by three oblique whitish strigulae. There is a fine whitish terminal line marked with several small blackish dots, the space between this and the preceding line brownish-tinged. The hindwings are grey.
