= Dichomeris pyrrhitis =

Scientific classification
- Kingdom: Animalia
- Phylum: Arthropoda
- Class: Insecta
- Order: Lepidoptera
- Family: Gelechiidae
- Genus: Dichomeris
- Species: D. pyrrhitis

Binomial name
- Dichomeris pyrrhitis (Meyrick, 1911)

Synonyms
- Trichotaphe pyrrhitis Meyrick, 1911

Species of moth

Dichomeris pyrrhitis is a moth in the family Gelechiidae. It was described by Edward Meyrick in 1911. It is found in South Africa and Zimbabwe.

The wingspan is 15–16 mm. The forewings are ferruginous brownish, irregularly mixed with rather dark grey and with the costal edge ochreous. The stigmata are deep ferruginous brown, the plical beneath the first discal, a similar less marked dot midway between the first discal and the base. There is a more or less developed small pale ochreous spot on the costa at two-thirds. The hindwings are dark grey.
