= Araeovalva albiflora =

Scientific classification
- Kingdom: Animalia
- Phylum: Arthropoda
- Class: Insecta
- Order: Lepidoptera
- Family: Gelechiidae
- Genus: Araeovalva
- Species: A. albiflora

Binomial name
- Araeovalva albiflora (Meyrick, 1920)

Synonyms
- Gelechia albiflora Meyrick, 1920

Species of moth

Araeovalva albiflora is a moth in the family Gelechiidae. It is found in South Africa.

The wingspan is 19–20 mm. The forewings are dark ashy-fuscous with an irregular ochreous-white transverse strigula from the base of the costa and an irregular ochreous-white spot beneath the costa at one-fifth, as well as a thick black streak extending along the fold from one-fifth to near the middle of the wing, interrupted by two ochreous-white spots. There is an ochreous-white spot in the disc slightly beyond the second of these, and a larger spot in disc at two-thirds, these more or less surrounded with black and united by a black blotch, opposite small cloudy whitish spots at three-fourths of the costa and tornus tending to unite into a straight line touching this. There are some irregular whitish scales in the disc beyond this. The hindwings are ochreous-whitish, with a slight bluish tinge.
