= Scrobipalpa colasta =

Scientific classification
- Kingdom: Animalia
- Phylum: Arthropoda
- Class: Insecta
- Order: Lepidoptera
- Family: Gelechiidae
- Genus: Scrobipalpa
- Species: S. colasta

Binomial name
- Scrobipalpa colasta (Meyrick, 1921)

Synonyms
- Phthorimaea colasta Meyrick, 1921

Species of moth

Scrobipalpa colasta is a moth in the family Gelechiidae. It was described by Edward Meyrick in 1921. It is found in South Africa.

The wingspan is about 7 mm (0.28 in). The forewings are pale greyish ochreous sprinkled with fuscous, with a few black scales and small suffused grey spots on the costa at the base, one-fourth, the middle, and two-thirds. There is a minute black dot near the base in the middle. The stigmata are black, the plical slightly before the first discal, the second discal below the middle. There are also some scattered black scales towards the apex. The hindwings are light grey.
