= Lacistodes brunneostola =

Scientific classification
- Domain: Eukaryota
- Kingdom: Animalia
- Phylum: Arthropoda
- Class: Insecta
- Order: Lepidoptera
- Family: Gelechiidae
- Genus: Lacistodes
- Species: L. brunneostola

Binomial name
- Lacistodes brunneostola Janse, 1960

Species of moth

Lacistodes brunneostola is a moth of the family Gelechiidae. It was described by Anthonie Johannes Theodorus Janse in 1960. It is found in Namibia and South Africa.
