= Anarsia citromitra =

Scientific classification
- Kingdom: Animalia
- Phylum: Arthropoda
- Class: Insecta
- Order: Lepidoptera
- Family: Gelechiidae
- Genus: Anarsia
- Species: A. citromitra

Binomial name
- Anarsia citromitra Meyrick, 1921

Species of moth

Anarsia citromitra is a moth of the family Gelechiidae. It was described by Edward Meyrick in 1921. It is found in Mozambique, Kenya, Malawi, Namibia, Mauritius, Réunion, South Africa and Zimbabwe.

The wingspan is about 11 mm. The forewings are light grey finely speckled or suffused with whitish, with some scattered black scales tending to form small irregular groups. There is a small blackish dot towards the costa near the base and a semi-oval black spot on the middle of the costa, preceded and followed by small black marks. There are three or four small black dots towards the costa posteriorly and at the apex. The hindwings are grey becoming hyaline (glass like) anteriorly, with the veins and termen suffused with dark fuscous.

Hostplants: The larvae of this species feed on Mimosa pudica and Pithecellobium dulce (Fabaceae).
