= Anarsia sciograpta =

Scientific classification
- Kingdom: Animalia
- Phylum: Arthropoda
- Class: Insecta
- Order: Lepidoptera
- Family: Gelechiidae
- Genus: Anarsia
- Species: A. sciograpta

Binomial name
- Anarsia sciograpta (Meyrick, 1921)

Synonyms
- Chelaria sciograpta Meyrick, 1921

Species of moth

Anarsia sciograpta is a moth of the family Gelechiidae. It was described by Edward Meyrick in 1921. It is found in South Africa.

The wingspan is about 10 mm. The forewings are grey irrorated (sprinkled) with white, with scattered blackish scales and an undefined spot of blackish-grey suffusion on the costa towards the base, and an elongate one towards the middle. There are faint darker spots beneath the costa in the middle and on the end of the cell, but hardly traceable, and some faint irregular darker mottling towards the apex. The hindwings are grey.
