= Anarsia hippocoma =

Scientific classification
- Kingdom: Animalia
- Phylum: Arthropoda
- Class: Insecta
- Order: Lepidoptera
- Family: Gelechiidae
- Genus: Anarsia
- Species: A. hippocoma

Binomial name
- Anarsia hippocoma Meyrick, 1921

Species of moth

Anarsia hippocoma is a moth of the family Gelechiidae. It was described by Edward Meyrick in 1921. It is found in Queensland.

The wingspan is about 11 mm. The forewings are dark fuscous, slightly speckled with grey whitish and with irregularly scattered coarse black scales. There are eight or nine small dark spots along the costa separated by pale irroration (speckles) and there is an oblique transverse blackish streak at about one-fourth of the wing, not reaching the margins. The hindwings are grey.
