= Anarsia semnopa =

Scientific classification
- Kingdom: Animalia
- Phylum: Arthropoda
- Class: Insecta
- Order: Lepidoptera
- Family: Gelechiidae
- Genus: Anarsia
- Species: A. semnopa

Binomial name
- Anarsia semnopa Meyrick, 1921

Species of moth

Anarsia semnopa is a moth of the family Gelechiidae. It was described by Edward Meyrick in 1921. It is found in Mozambique, South Africa and Zimbabwe.

The wingspan is 11–14 mm. The forewings are pale grey suffusedly irrorated (sprinkled) with white, with a few scattered black scales and a black dot on the base of the costa, as well as slight strigulae before and beyond one-fourth. There is a semi-oval blackish spot on the middle of the costa and an oblique blackish spot in the disc somewhat before this, resting on a streak of grey suffusion mixed with blackish along the fold to near the extremity, connected with the dorsum by suffused spots before the middle and at four-fifths. There is an elongate black mark in the disc at three-fourths and a small grey spot on the costa above this, as well as a streak of grey suffusion along the termen, mixed with blackish on the tornus. The hindwings are grey, anteriorly thinly scaled and subhyaline (almost glass like) with violet-blue iridescence.
