= Anarsia leucophora =

Scientific classification
- Kingdom: Animalia
- Phylum: Arthropoda
- Class: Insecta
- Order: Lepidoptera
- Family: Gelechiidae
- Genus: Anarsia
- Species: A. leucophora

Binomial name
- Anarsia leucophora Meyrick, 1904

Species of moth

Anarsia leucophora is a moth of the family Gelechiidae. It was described by Edward Meyrick in 1904. It is found in New South Wales.

The wingspan is about 10 mm (0.39 in). The forewings are whitish, irregularly sprinkled with fuscous and dark fuscous and with a narrow irregular dark fuscous fascia from the costa at one-third, not reaching the dorsum. There is a triangular dark fuscous blotch from the costa about the middle, reaching two-thirds across the wing. There are some scattered blackish scales in the disc posteriorly, indicating the second discal stigma, and towards the apex, and some fuscous suffusion towards the apex and termen. The hindwings are whitish grey, thinly scaled and semitransparent, but darker posteriorly.
