= Anarsia pensilis =

Scientific classification
- Kingdom: Animalia
- Phylum: Arthropoda
- Class: Insecta
- Order: Lepidoptera
- Family: Gelechiidae
- Genus: Anarsia
- Species: A. pensilis

Binomial name
- Anarsia pensilis Meyrick, 1913

Species of moth

Anarsia pensilis is a moth of the family Gelechiidae. It was described by Edward Meyrick in 1913. It is found in Sri Lanka.

The wingspan is 14–17 mm. The forewings are whitish irrorated (sprinkled) with light grey and with a few scattered black scales and two slight blackish marks on the costa anteriorly, and one beyond the middle. There is a black triangular spot on the middle of the costa, whence a black streak runs to the dorsum before the middle and is slenderly extended along the dorsum towards the base. There is also a small irregular grey spot with some black scales in the disc at three-fourths, as well as indications of grey spots with some black scales around the posterior part of the apex and termen. The hindwings are rather dark grey, almost hyaline (glass like) in the disc towards the base.
