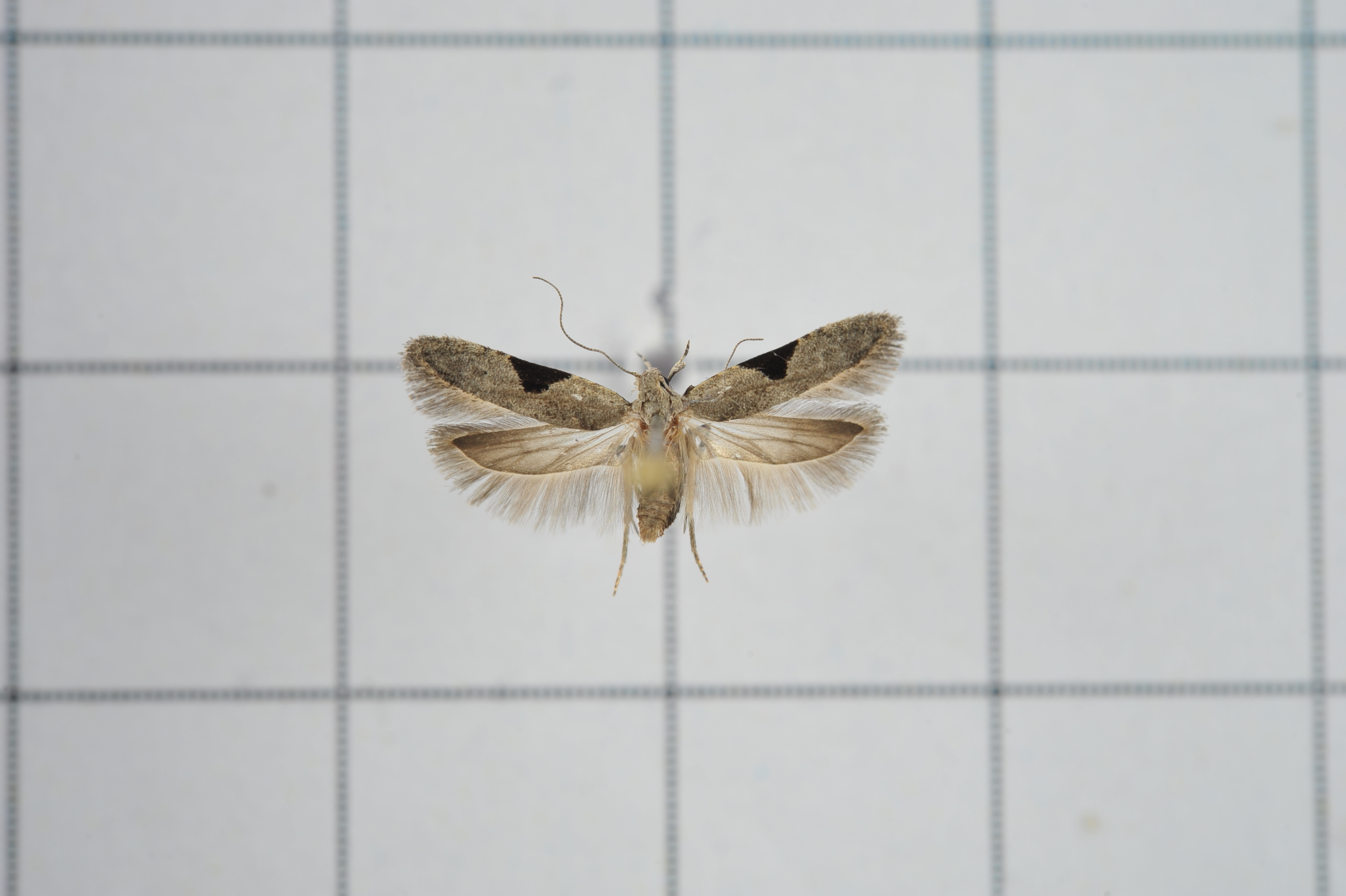

Scientific classification
- Kingdom: Animalia
- Phylum: Arthropoda
- Class: Insecta
- Order: Lepidoptera
- Family: Gelechiidae
- Genus: Anarsia
- Species: A. isogona

Binomial name
- Anarsia isogona Meyrick, 1913

Synonyms
- Ananarsia isogona

= Anarsia isogona =

Species of moth

Anarsia isogona is a moth of the family Gelechiidae. In 1933, it was described by Edward Meyrick. It is found in Japan (Honshu, Kyushu), China (Zhejiang, Yunnan), Taiwan and southern India.

The wingspan is about 12 mm. The forewings are greyish ochreous sprinkled with whitish, with some scattered fuscous and blackish scales and with several slight blackish marks on the costa. There is a triangular blackish blotch occupying the median fourth of the costa and reaching more than halfway across the wing. There are also obscure small spots of dark fuscous suffusion in the disc towards the base, near the dorsum at one-fourth, on the dorsum at three-fourths and at the tornus. The hindwings are grey, becoming hyaline (glass like) anteriorly.

The larvae feed on Schima species.
