= Anarsia eriozona =

Scientific classification
- Kingdom: Animalia
- Phylum: Arthropoda
- Class: Insecta
- Order: Lepidoptera
- Family: Gelechiidae
- Genus: Anarsia
- Species: A. eriozona

Binomial name
- Anarsia eriozona (Meyrick, 1921)

Synonyms
- Chelaria eriozona Meyrick, 1921

Species of moth

Anarsia eriozona is a moth of the family Gelechiidae. It was described by Edward Meyrick in 1921. It is found in Mozambique and Kenya.

The wingspan is about 10 mm. The forewings are dark grey with a small dark fuscous spot on the base of the costa, edged with whitish posteriorly. There is a rather narrow whitish transverse fascia at one-third, preceded by some dark fuscous suffusion. There is also an elongate suffused blackish mark on the middle of the costa, and a small blackish spot at three-fourths, the costal edge whitish on each side of these. Some scattered dots of dark fuscous suffusion are found in the disc posteriorly. The hindwings are rather dark grey, thinly scaled in the disc anteriorly.
