= Anarsia balioneura =

Scientific classification
- Kingdom: Animalia
- Phylum: Arthropoda
- Class: Insecta
- Order: Lepidoptera
- Family: Gelechiidae
- Genus: Anarsia
- Species: A. balioneura

Binomial name
- Anarsia balioneura Meyrick, 1921

Species of moth

Anarsia balioneura is a moth of the family Gelechiidae. It was described by Edward Meyrick in 1921. It is found in Cabo Verde, Kenya, Malawi, Uganda and Zimbabwe.

The wingspan is about 12 mm. The forewings are grey irregularly irrorated (sprinkled) with whitish, with scattered black scales and with a narrow semi-oval suffused dark fuscous spot on the middle of the costa, and small spots before and beyond it, connected with it by a dark grey suffusion which extends vaguely across the wing and contains some black scales tending to form short longitudinal rows and some irroration along the dorsum. There are two or three short blackish marks at the apex and on the upper part of the termen. The hindwings are grey, thinly scaled and subhyaline (almost glass like) in the disc and towards the base, with the veins suffused with dark grey. There are so I'llme long downwards-directed greyish hairs from beneath the costa towards the base.
