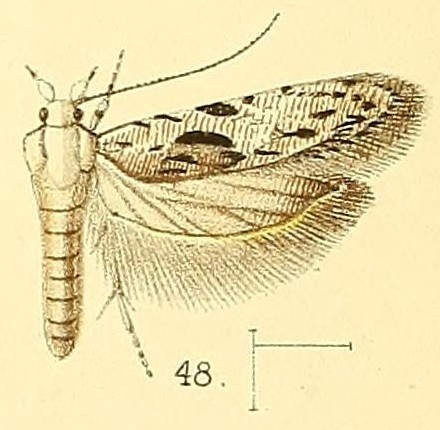

Scientific classification
- Domain: Eukaryota
- Kingdom: Animalia
- Phylum: Arthropoda
- Class: Insecta
- Order: Lepidoptera
- Family: Gelechiidae
- Genus: Anarsia
- Species: A. agricola

Binomial name
- Anarsia agricola Walsingham, 1891

Synonyms
- Anarsia agricola var. gambiensis Strand, 1913

= Anarsia agricola =

Species of moth

Anarsia agricola is a moth of the family Gelechiidae. It was described by Walsingham in 1891. It is found in the Democratic Republic of Congo, Kenya, Mozambique, Namibia, South Africa, Tanzania, Gambia, Zambia and Zimbabwe.

The larvae feed on Alchornea cordifolia and Combretum species.
