= Anarsia longipalpella =

Scientific classification
- Domain: Eukaryota
- Kingdom: Animalia
- Phylum: Arthropoda
- Class: Insecta
- Order: Lepidoptera
- Family: Gelechiidae
- Genus: Anarsia
- Species: A. longipalpella

Binomial name
- Anarsia longipalpella Rebel, 1907

Species of moth

Anarsia longipalpella is a moth of the family Gelechiidae. It was described by Rebel in 1907. It is found in Yemen (Socotra).
