= Anarsia eburnella =

Scientific classification
- Domain: Eukaryota
- Kingdom: Animalia
- Phylum: Arthropoda
- Class: Insecta
- Order: Lepidoptera
- Family: Gelechiidae
- Genus: Anarsia
- Species: A. eburnella

Binomial name
- Anarsia eburnella Christoph, 1887

Species of moth

Anarsia eburnella is a moth in the family Gelechiidae. It was described by Hugo Theodor Christoph in 1887. It is found in Turkmenistan, Iran and Afghanistan.

The length of the forewings is about 8 mm. The forewings are bone yellow and the hindwings are light grey.
