= Anarsia gajiensis =

Scientific classification
- Kingdom: Animalia
- Phylum: Arthropoda
- Class: Insecta
- Order: Lepidoptera
- Family: Gelechiidae
- Genus: Anarsia
- Species: A. gajiensis

Binomial name
- Anarsia gajiensis Park & Ponomarenko, 1996

Synonyms
- Ananarsia gajiensis

Species of moth

Anarsia gajiensis is a moth of the family Gelechiidae. It was described by Kyu-Tek Park and Margarita Gennadievna Ponomarenko in 1996. It is found in Korea.
