= Anarsia protensa =

Scientific classification
- Kingdom: Animalia
- Phylum: Arthropoda
- Clade: Pancrustacea
- Class: Insecta
- Order: Lepidoptera
- Family: Gelechiidae
- Genus: Anarsia
- Species: A. protensa

Binomial name
- Anarsia protensa Park, 1995

Synonyms
- Ananarsia protensa

Species of moth

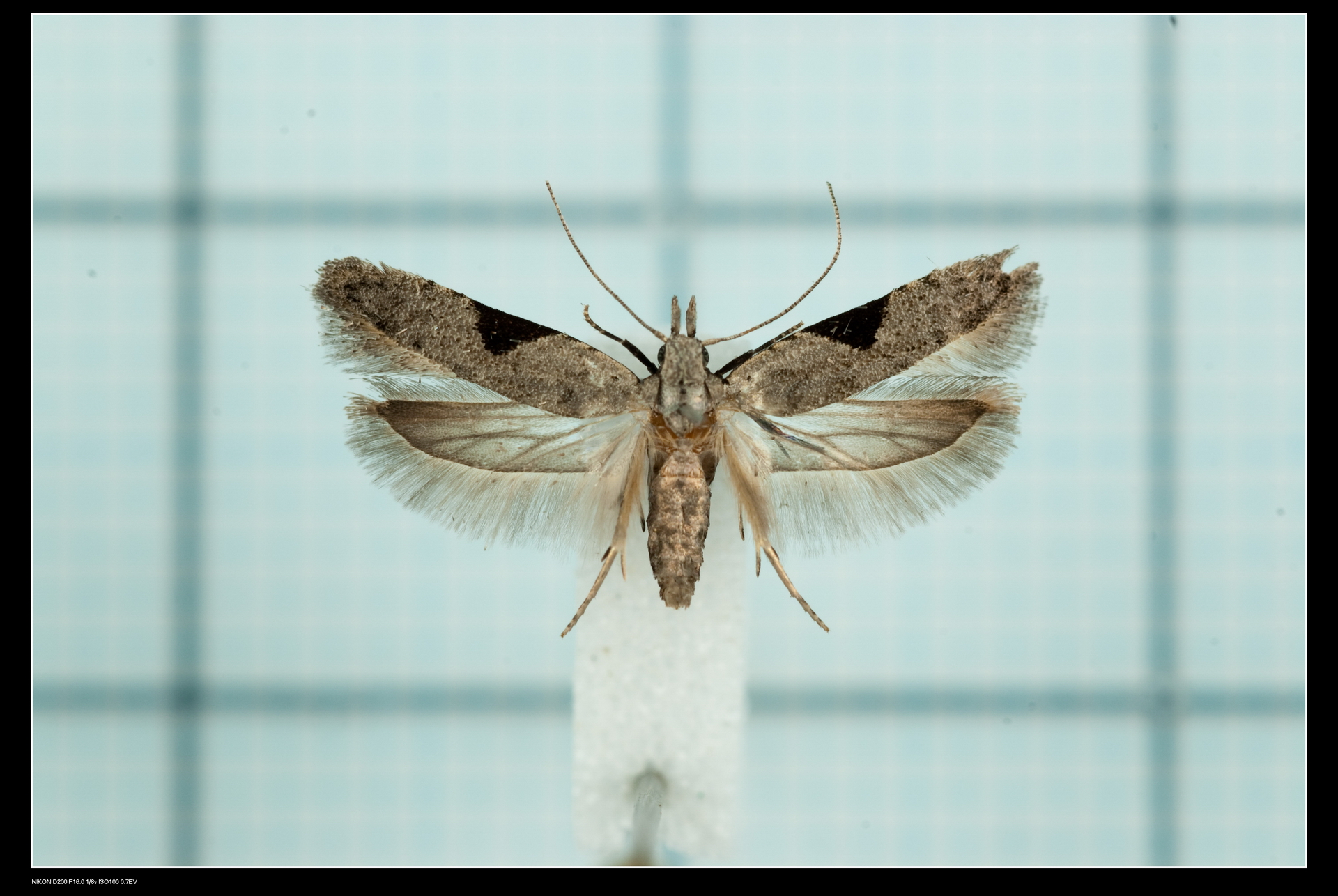
Anarsia protensa

Anarsia protensa is a moth of the family Gelechiidae. It was described by Kyu-Tek Park in 1995. It is found in Japan (Honshu, Kyushu) and Taiwan.

The wingspan is about 15 mm.

The larvae feed on Elaeagnus pungens. They bore in the fruits of the host plant.
