= Anarsia luticostella =

Scientific classification
- Domain: Eukaryota
- Kingdom: Animalia
- Phylum: Arthropoda
- Class: Insecta
- Order: Lepidoptera
- Family: Gelechiidae
- Genus: Anarsia
- Species: A. luticostella

Binomial name
- Anarsia luticostella Chrétien, 1915

Species of moth

Anarsia luticostella is a moth in the family Gelechiidae. It was described by Pierre Chrétien in 1915. It is found in Algeria.
