= Anarsia conica =

Scientific classification
- Kingdom: Animalia
- Phylum: Arthropoda
- Class: Insecta
- Order: Lepidoptera
- Family: Gelechiidae
- Genus: Anarsia
- Species: A. conica

Binomial name
- Anarsia conica Park & Ponomarenko, 1996

Species of moth

Anarsia conica is a moth in the family Gelechiidae. It was described by Kyu-Tek Park and Margarita Gennadievna Ponomarenko in 1996. It is found in Thailand.

The wingspan is 10-10.5 mm.
