= Anarsia sagittaria =

Scientific classification
- Kingdom: Animalia
- Phylum: Arthropoda
- Class: Insecta
- Order: Lepidoptera
- Family: Gelechiidae
- Genus: Anarsia
- Species: A. sagittaria

Binomial name
- Anarsia sagittaria Meyrick, 1914

Species of moth

Anarsia sagittaria is a moth in the family Gelechiidae. It was described by Edward Meyrick in 1914. It is found in Bengal.

The wingspan is 13–15 mm. The forewings are light fuscous, slightly sprinkled with ochreous whitish and with some scattered black scales here and there on the veins, as well as a black streak along the submedian fold, strong on the basal half, attenuated posteriorly. There is a blackish mark beneath this at the base, a slender black longitudinal streak in the disc from before the middle to three-fourths, reduced to scattered scales posteriorly. There is a slender subdorsal streak of black sprinkles from one-fourth to three-fourths. The hindwings are grey, paler and thinly scaled anteriorly.
