= Anarsia paraisogona =

Scientific classification
- Kingdom: Animalia
- Phylum: Arthropoda
- Class: Insecta
- Order: Lepidoptera
- Family: Gelechiidae
- Genus: Anarsia
- Species: A. paraisogona

Binomial name
- Anarsia paraisogona Park & Ponomarenko, 1996

Species of moth

Anarsia paraisogona is a moth in the family Gelechiidae. It was described by Kyu-Tek Park and Margarita Gennadievna Ponomarenko in 1996. It is found in Thailand.

The wingspan is 10–11 mm.
