= Anarsia triaenota =

Scientific classification
- Kingdom: Animalia
- Phylum: Arthropoda
- Class: Insecta
- Order: Lepidoptera
- Family: Gelechiidae
- Genus: Anarsia
- Species: A. triaenota

Binomial name
- Anarsia triaenota Meyrick, 1913

Species of moth

Anarsia triaenota is a moth in the family Gelechiidae. It was described by Edward Meyrick in 1913. It is found in southern India and Myanmar.

The wingspan is about 12 mm. The forewings are grey irregularly sprinkled with white and with black markings, partially edged with white suffusion. There are two oblique strigulae from the costa anteriorly, an oblique spot in the middle, and several small marks posteriorly. There are subcostal, median, submedian, and subdorsal longitudinal streaks, each broken irregularly into about three segments and there are also some black scales along the termen. The hindwings are grey, thinly scaled anteriorly, with the veins and termen darker.
