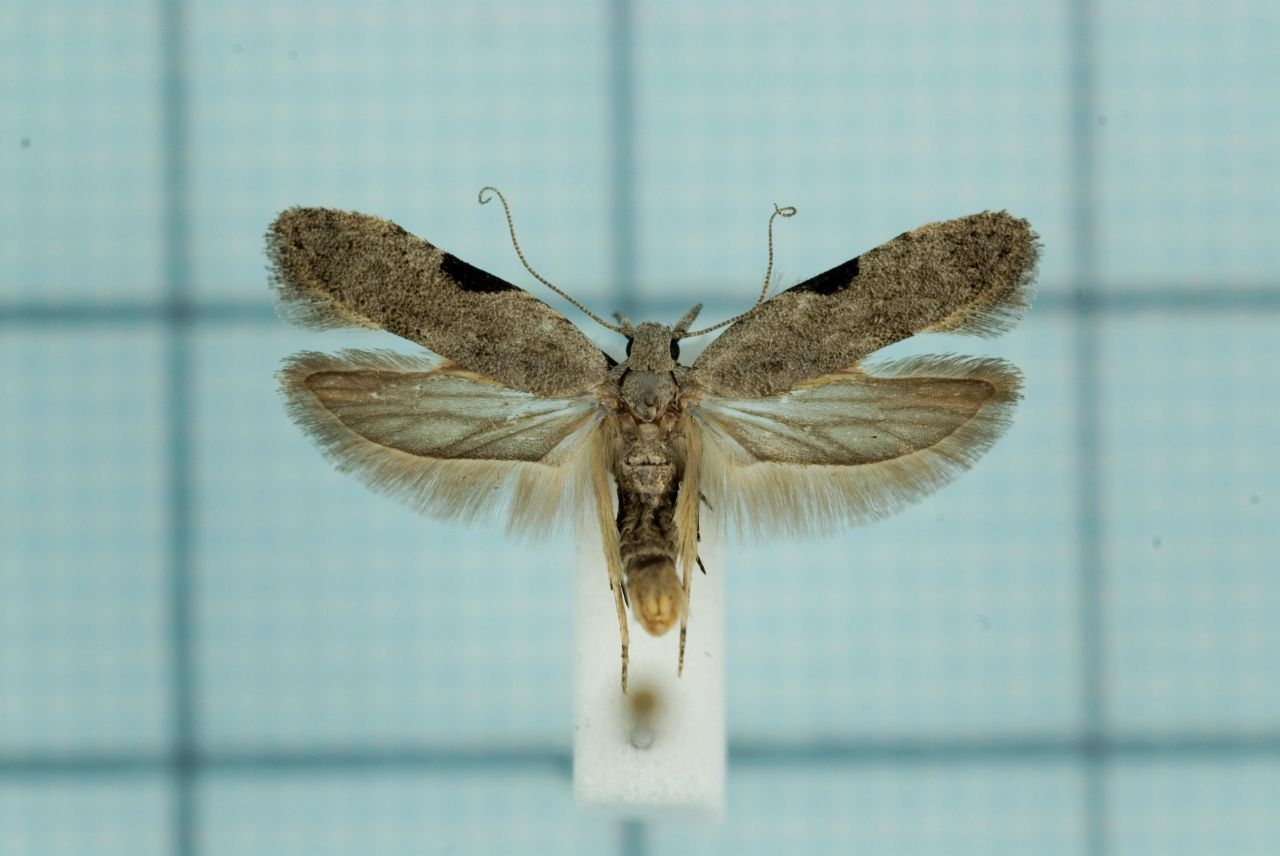
- Anarsia euphorodes

Scientific classification
- Domain: Eukaryota
- Kingdom: Animalia
- Phylum: Arthropoda
- Class: Insecta
- Order: Lepidoptera
- Family: Gelechiidae
- Tribe: Chelariini
- Genus: Anarsia; Zeller, 1839

Synonyms
- Ananarsia Amsel, 1959

= Anarsia =

Genus of moths

Anarsia is a genus of moths in the family Gelechiidae.

== Species ==
- Anarsia acaciae Walsingham, 1896
- Anarsia acerata Meyrick, 1913
- Anarsia acrotoma Meyrick, 1913
- Anarsia agricola Walsingham, 1891
- Anarsia albibasella Janse, 1963
- Anarsia aleurodes Meyrick, 1922
- Anarsia altercata Meyrick, 1918
- Anarsia amalleuta Meyrick, 1913
- Anarsia amegarta Meyrick, 1933
- Anarsia anisodonta Diakonoff 1954
- Anarsia anthracaula Meyrick, 1929
- Anarsia antisaris (Meyrick, 1913)
- Anarsia arachniota Meyrick, 1925
- Anarsia arsenopa Meyrick, 1920
- Anarsia aspera Park, 1995
- Anarsia asymmetrodes Park, 2014
- Anarsia austerodes (Meyrick, 1918)
- Anarsia balioneura Meyrick, 1921
- Anarsia beitunica Li & Zheng, 1997
- Anarsia belutschistanella (Amsel, 1959)
- Anarsia bilbainella Rössler 1877
- Anarsia bimaculata Ponomarenko, 1989
- Anarsia bipinnata (Meyrick, 1932)
- Anarsia callicosma Janse, 1960
- Anarsia carbonaria Meyrick, 1913
- Anarsia centrospila (Turner, 1919)
- Anarsia chaonella Park, 1995
- Anarsia chiangmaiensis Park & Ponomarenko, 1996
- Anarsia choana Park, 1995
- Anarsia citromitra Meyrick, 1921
- Anarsia conica Park & Ponomarenko, 1996
- Anarsia crassipalpella Legrand, 1966
- Anarsia decora Li & Zheng, 1997
- Anarsia dejoannisi Rössler, 1994
- Anarsia didymopa Meyrick 1916
- Anarsia dodonaea Bippus, 2020
- Anarsia dryinopa Lower 1897
- Anarsia eburnella Christoph, 1887
- Anarsia eleagnella Kuznetsov, 1957
- Anarsia elongata Park, 1995
- Anarsia ephippias Meyrick, 1908
- Anarsia epiula Meyrick 1904
- Anarsia epotias Meyrick, 1916
- Anarsia eriozona (Meyrick, 1921)
- Anarsia euphorodes Meyrick, 1922
- Anarsia eutacta Meyrick, 1921
- Anarsia eximia Li & Zheng, 1997
- Anarsia gajiensis Park & Ponomarenko, 1996
- Anarsia gambiensis Strand, 1913
- Anarsia geminella Amsel, 1967
- Anarsia gravata Meyrick, 1911
- Anarsia guiera Bradley, 1969
- Anarsia halimodendri Christoph, 1877
- Anarsia hippocoma Meyrick 1921
- Anarsia idioptila Meyrick, 1916
- Anarsia incerta Ueda, 1997
- Anarsia inculta Walsingham, 1891
- Anarsia innoxiella Gregersen & Karsholt, 2017
- Anarsia isogona Meyrick, 1913
- Anarsia largimacularis Li & Zheng, 1997
- Anarsia leberonella Real, 1994
- Anarsia lechriosema Bradley, 1982
- Anarsia leucophora Meyrick 1904
- Anarsia lewvanichae Park & Ponomarenko, 1996
- Anarsia libanoticella Amsel, 1967
- Anarsia lineatella Zeller 1839
- Anarsia longipalpella Rebel, 1907
- Anarsia luticostella Chrétien, 1915
- Anarsia magnibimaculata Li & Zheng, 1997
- Anarsia malagasyella Viette, 1968
- Anarsia meiosis Park & Ponomarenko, 1996
- Anarsia melanchropa Meyrick, 1926
- Anarsia melanoplecta Meyrick, 1914
- Anarsia minutella (Turati, 1929)
- Anarsia mitescens Meyrick, 1913
- Anarsia molybdota Meyrick 1904
- Anarsia nigricana Park, 1991
- Anarsia nigrimacula Janse, 1949
- Anarsia nimbosa Meyrick, 1913
- Anarsia novitricornis Li & Zheng, 1997
- Anarsia nuristanella Amsel, 1967
- Anarsia omoptila Meyrick, 1918
- Anarsia ovula Park & Ponomarenko, 1996
- Anarsia paraisogona Park & Ponomarenko, 1996
- Anarsia parkae Rose and Pathania, 2003
- Anarsia patulella Walker, 1864
- Anarsia pensilis Meyrick, 1913
- Anarsia permissa Meyrick, 1926
- Anarsia phortica Meyrick, 1913
- Anarsia pinnata Meyrick, 1931
- Anarsia procera Park & Ponomarenko, 1996
- Anarsia protensa Park, 1995
- Anarsia psammobia Falkovitsh & Bidzilya, 2003
- Anarsia pustulata Janse, 1949
- Anarsia reciproca Meyrick, 1920
- Anarsia retamella Chrétien, 1915
- Anarsia renukaensis Rose and Pathania, 2003
- Anarsia sagittaria Meyrick, 1914
- Anarsia sagmatica Meyrick, 1916
- Anarsia sciograpta (Meyrick, 1921)
- Anarsia sciotona Meyrick, 1927
- Anarsia semnopa Meyrick, 1921
- Anarsia sibirica Park & Ponomarenko, 1996
- Anarsia silvosa Ueda, 1997
- Anarsia spartiella (Schrank, 1802)
- Anarsia spatulana Park & Ponomarenko, 1996
- Anarsia spicata Meyrick, 1918
- Anarsia squamerecta Li & Zheng, 1997
- Anarsia stepposella Ponomarenko, 2002
- Anarsia sthenarota Meyrick, 1926
- Anarsia stylota Meyrick, 1913
- Anarsia subfulvescens Meyrick, 1918
- Anarsia subnigricana Park & Ponomarenko, 1996
- Anarsia tanyharensis Rose and Pathania, 2003
- Anarsia taurella Bradley, 1961
- Anarsia tegumentus Rose and Pathania, 2003
- Anarsia tortuosa (Meyrick, 1913)
- Anarsia tortuosella Amsel, 1967
- Anarsia tremata Bippus, 2020
- Anarsia triaenota Meyrick, 1913
- Anarsia tricornis Meyrick, 1913
- Anarsia triglypta Meyrick, 1933
- Anarsia ulmarata Bradley, 1961
- Anarsia ulneongensis Park & Ponomarenko, 1996
- Anarsia valvata Rose and Pathania, 2003
- Anarsia vectaria Meyrick, 1918
- Anarsia veruta Meyrick, 1918
- Anarsia vinsonella Viette, 1957

== Former species ==
- Anarsia cyrtopleura (Turner, 1919)
