= Anarsia nimbosa =

Scientific classification
- Kingdom: Animalia
- Phylum: Arthropoda
- Class: Insecta
- Order: Lepidoptera
- Family: Gelechiidae
- Genus: Anarsia
- Species: A. nimbosa

Binomial name
- Anarsia nimbosa Meyrick, 1913

Species of moth

Anarsia nimbosa is a moth of the family Gelechiidae. It was described by Edward Meyrick in 1913. It is found in Namibia, South Africa and Zimbabwe.

The wingspan is 11–14 mm. The forewings are dark grey irregularly sprinkled with white, and strewn with black scales tending to form streaks on the veins and sometimes a cloudy patch of dark suffusion on the fold at one-fourth. There is an elongate cloudy blackish spot on the middle of the costa and a shorter one preceding it, tending to coalesce and merge in a very undefined triangular patch of dark suffusion extending from the costa to the fold. The hindwings are grey.
