= Anarsia omoptila =

Scientific classification
- Kingdom: Animalia
- Phylum: Arthropoda
- Class: Insecta
- Order: Lepidoptera
- Family: Gelechiidae
- Genus: Anarsia
- Species: A. omoptila

Binomial name
- Anarsia omoptila Meyrick, 1918

Species of moth

Anarsia omoptila is a moth in the family Gelechiidae. It was described by Edward Meyrick in 1918. It is found in south India.

The wingspan is 11–12 mm. The forewings are fuscous, suffusedly irrorated (sprinkled) or almost wholly suffused with whitish and with the costal edge black at the base. There is a small elongate-oval blackish spot on the middle of the costa, and smaller marks at one-fourth, one-third and two-thirds. There is an undefined spot of dark grey suffusion on the base of the dorsum and a rather large irregularly semi-oval blotch of dark grey or dark fuscous suffusion on the middle of the dorsum, terminated above by an elongate or subtriangular blackish spot in the middle of the disc. There is also an elongate blackish mark in the disc at three-fourths, two or three cloudy dark fuscous dots towards the costa posteriorly and on the termen beneath the apex. The hindwings are prismatic fuscous whitish, the margins grey.

The larvae feed on Cajanus indicus. They feed from within folded leaves of their host plant.
