= Anarsia austerodes =

Scientific classification
- Kingdom: Animalia
- Phylum: Arthropoda
- Class: Insecta
- Order: Lepidoptera
- Family: Gelechiidae
- Genus: Anarsia
- Species: A. austerodes

Binomial name
- Anarsia austerodes (Meyrick, 1918)

Synonyms
- Chelaria austerodes Meyrick, 1916; Hypatima austerodes

Species of moth

Anarsia austerodes is a moth in the family Gelechiidae. It was described by Edward Meyrick in 1918. It is found in Namibia and South Africa (Gauteng, Limpopo).

The wingspan is about 16 mm. The forewings are dark grey irregularly sprinkled with whitish, with scattered small blackish tufts and dashes. There is a longitudinal ochreous-brown mark near the base in the middle, as well as seven or eight small oblique blackish spots along the costa. There is an erect-oval spot of ground colour above the tornus edged on the upper half with blackish and on the lower with whitish. There are some blackish markings along the termen. The hindwings are dark grey, thinly scaled and whitish-tinged anteriorly, with hyaline (glass-like) streaks in and beneath the cell.
