= Anarsia crassipalpella =

Scientific classification
- Kingdom: Animalia
- Phylum: Arthropoda
- Class: Insecta
- Order: Lepidoptera
- Family: Gelechiidae
- Genus: Anarsia
- Species: A. crassipalpella

Binomial name
- Anarsia crassipalpella Legrand, 1966

Species of moth

Anarsia crassipalpella is a moth of the family Gelechiidae. It was described by Henry Legrand in 1966. It is found on Aldabra in the Seychelles.
