= Anarsia ulneongensis =

Scientific classification
- Kingdom: Animalia
- Phylum: Arthropoda
- Class: Insecta
- Order: Lepidoptera
- Family: Gelechiidae
- Genus: Anarsia
- Species: A. ulneongensis

Binomial name
- Anarsia ulneongensis Park & Ponomarenko, 1996

Species of moth

Anarsia ulneongensis is a moth in the family Gelechiidae. It was described by Kyu-Tek Park and Margarita Gennadievna Ponomarenko in 1996. It is found in Korea and Japan (Kyushu, Ryukyus).

The length of the forewings is 4.8-6.5 mm for males and 5.4-6.3 mm for females.
