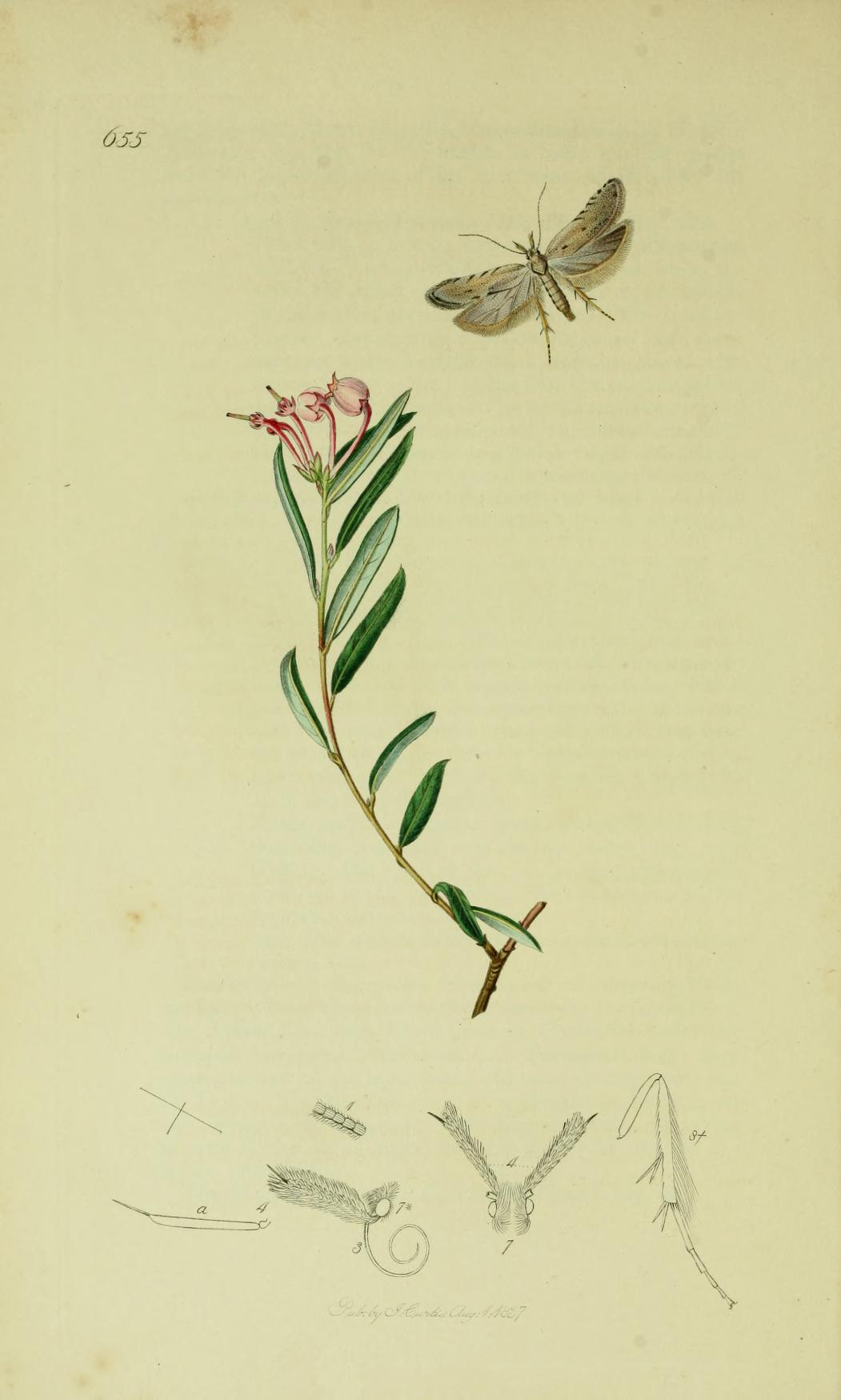
- Illustration from John Curtis's British Entomology Volume 6

Scientific classification
- Domain: Eukaryota
- Kingdom: Animalia
- Phylum: Arthropoda
- Class: Insecta
- Order: Lepidoptera
- Family: Gelechiidae
- Genus: Anarsia
- Species: A. spartiella

Binomial name
- Anarsia spartiella (Schrank, 1802)

Synonyms
- Tinea spartiella Schrank, 1802; Anarsia acutiloba Real, 1994; Anarsia genistae Stainton, 1854; Anarsia krausei Real, 1994; Anarsia lhommeella Real, 1994; Anarsia pseudospartiella Real, 1994; Anarsia pseuspartiella Real, 1994; Anarsia ragonotella Real, 1994; Aplota robertsonella Curtis, 1837; Anarsia ungemachi Real, 1994

= Anarsia spartiella =

Wanstead grey

Species of moth

Anarsia spartiella, the Wanstead grey, is a moth of the family Gelechiidae. It is found in most of Europe.

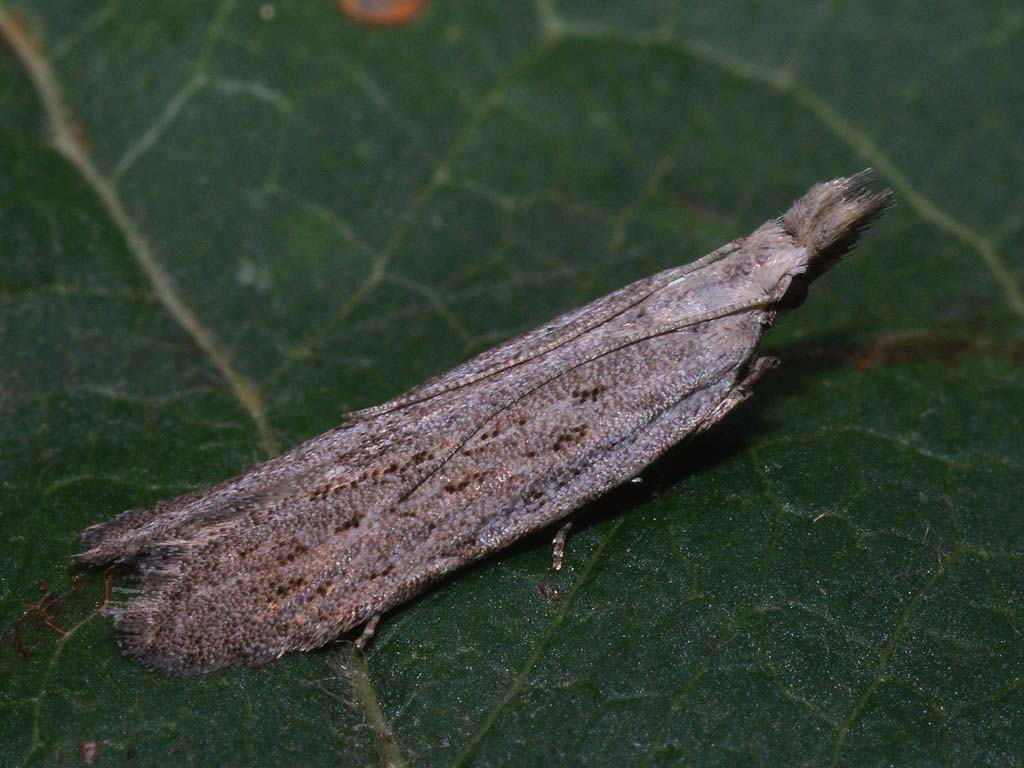
Exemplar from Moscow Oblast, Russia

The wingspan is 12–15 mm. The forewings are grey-whitish, finely irrorated with fuscous, often with some black scales, occasionally much suffused with dark fuscous; several short oblique dark fuscous costal marks, one in middle largest; stigmata sometimes indicated by black dashes; often a black terminal spot below apex. Hindwings are light grey. The larva is dark brown; head and plate of 2 black

Adults are on wing from June to August.

The larvae feed on Ulex and Cytisus species, as well as Genista tinctoria. They spin the shoots of their host plant and feed within.
