= Anarsia belutschistanella =

Scientific classification
- Kingdom: Animalia
- Phylum: Arthropoda
- Clade: Pancrustacea
- Class: Insecta
- Order: Lepidoptera
- Family: Gelechiidae
- Genus: Anarsia
- Species: A. belutschistanella

Binomial name
- Anarsia belutschistanella (Amsel, 1959)

Synonyms
- Ananarsia belutschistanella Amsel, 1959

Species of moth

Anarsia belutschistanella is a moth in the family Gelechiidae. It was described by Hans Georg Amsel in 1959. It is found in Iran.
