= Anarsia veruta =

Scientific classification
- Kingdom: Animalia
- Phylum: Arthropoda
- Class: Insecta
- Order: Lepidoptera
- Family: Gelechiidae
- Genus: Anarsia
- Species: A. veruta

Binomial name
- Anarsia veruta Meyrick, 1918

Species of moth

Anarsia veruta is a moth in the family Gelechiidae. It was described by Edward Meyrick in 1918. It is found in India (Bengal).

The wingspan is about 11 mm. The forewings are fuscous, somewhat sprinkled with paler and darker and with a suffused blackish longitudinal streak in the disc from two-fifths to four-fifths, and one or two short suffused dashes above the apex of this between the veins. The hindwings are light grey, thinly scaled anteriorly.

The larvae feed on Inga dulcis.
