= Anarsia tortuosa =

Scientific classification
- Kingdom: Animalia
- Phylum: Arthropoda
- Class: Insecta
- Order: Lepidoptera
- Family: Gelechiidae
- Genus: Anarsia
- Species: A. tortuosa

Binomial name
- Anarsia tortuosa (Meyrick, 1913)

Synonyms
- Chelaria tortuosa Meyrick, 1913; Hypatima tortuosa Meyrick, 1913

Species of moth

Anarsia tortuosa is a moth in the family Gelechiidae. It was described by Edward Meyrick in 1913. It is found in Japan (Ryukyus) and Sri Lanka.

The wingspan is about 14 mm. The forewings are brown, sprinkled with dark fuscous and with undefined irregular longitudinal streaks of ochreous-whitish suffusion above and below the fold throughout. There is a streak of dark fuscous suffusion along the fold throughout and the rest of the wing irregularly marked with broken longitudinal streaks of dark fuscous suffusion. The costa is suffused with dark fuscous from before the middle to four-fifths. The hindwings are grey, thinly scaled and subhyaline (almost glass like) anteriorly, with the veins and termen dark fuscous.
