= Anarsia acrotoma =

Scientific classification
- Kingdom: Animalia
- Phylum: Arthropoda
- Class: Insecta
- Order: Lepidoptera
- Family: Gelechiidae
- Genus: Anarsia
- Species: A. acrotoma

Binomial name
- Anarsia acrotoma Meyrick, 1913

Species of moth

Anarsia acrotoma is a moth of the family Gelechiidae. It was described by Edward Meyrick in 1913. It is found in southern India.

The wingspan is about 10 mm (0.39 in). The forewings are light greyish ochreous, irrorated (sprinkled) with whitish and with a few scattered fuscous and blackish scales, as well as a short black dash beneath the costa near the base. There is a triangular blackish patch occupying the median third of the costa. The apex is truncate, reaching more than half across the wing and there is a very small dark fuscous spot on costa at three-fourths, and a black dot or dash beneath it. There are also indications of blackish dots round the posterior part of the costa and termen. The hindwings are grey, becoming iridescent hyaline anteriorly.
