= Anarsia bimaculata =

Scientific classification
- Kingdom: Animalia
- Phylum: Arthropoda
- Class: Insecta
- Order: Lepidoptera
- Family: Gelechiidae
- Genus: Anarsia
- Species: A. bimaculata

Binomial name
- Anarsia bimaculata Ponomarenko, 1989

Synonyms
- Anarsia magnibimaculata Li & Zheng, 1997

Species of moth

Anarsia bimaculata is a moth in the family Gelechiidae. It was described by Margarita Gennadievna Ponomarenko in 1989. It is found in Japan, Korea, the Russian Far East (Primorye), and China (Jilin, Shaanxi).

The length of the forewings is 6.5–7.2 mm for males and 6.6–7.4 mm for females. The larvae feed on Maackia amurensis.
