= Anarsia vectaria =

Scientific classification
- Kingdom: Animalia
- Phylum: Arthropoda
- Class: Insecta
- Order: Lepidoptera
- Family: Gelechiidae
- Genus: Anarsia
- Species: A. vectaria

Binomial name
- Anarsia vectaria Meyrick, 1918

Species of moth

Anarsia vectaria is a moth of the family Gelechiidae. It was described by Edward Meyrick in 1918. It is found in Mozambique and South Africa.

The wingspan is 8–13 mm. The forewings are pale grey finely irrorated (sprinkled) with white and with small black dots on the costa at the base and one-fifth, and one towards the costa near the base. There is a triangular blackish blotch extending on the costa from one-third to three-fifths and nearly reaching the fold, its apex subtruncate. A small black dot is found below the fold near before the apex of this. There are some indistinct blackish-grey dots around the apical part of the costa and termen. The hindwings are subhyaline-prismatic, posteriorly suffused with dark grey, with the veins dark grey.
