= Anarsia guiera =

Scientific classification
- Kingdom: Animalia
- Phylum: Arthropoda
- Clade: Pancrustacea
- Class: Insecta
- Order: Lepidoptera
- Family: Gelechiidae
- Genus: Anarsia
- Species: A. guiera

Binomial name
- Anarsia guiera Bradley, 1969

Species of moth

Anarsia guiera is a moth in the family Gelechiidae. It was described by John David Bradley in 1969 and is found in northern Nigeria.

Larvae have been recorded feeding within galls made on Guiera senegalensis.
