= Anarsia arsenopa =

Scientific classification
- Kingdom: Animalia
- Phylum: Arthropoda
- Class: Insecta
- Order: Lepidoptera
- Family: Gelechiidae
- Genus: Anarsia
- Species: A. arsenopa

Binomial name
- Anarsia arsenopa Meyrick, 1920

Species of moth

Anarsia arsenopa is a moth of the family Gelechiidae. It was described by Edward Meyrick in 1920. It is found in Kenya.
