= Anarsia altercata =

Scientific classification
- Kingdom: Animalia
- Phylum: Arthropoda
- Clade: Pancrustacea
- Class: Insecta
- Order: Lepidoptera
- Family: Gelechiidae
- Genus: Anarsia
- Species: A. altercata

Binomial name
- Anarsia altercata Meyrick, 1918

Species of moth

Anarsia altercata is a moth in the family Gelechiidae. It was described by Edward Meyrick in 1918. It is found in India (Bengal).

The wingspan is about 10 mm. The forewings are whitish irrorated fuscous, more strongly posteriorly and with a dark fuscous dot on the base of the costa. There are oblique dark grey marks from the costa before and beyond one-fourth with two or three black scales beneath them, a small elongate spot before the middle, and a dot at two-thirds. There is a small black dot beneath the costa near the base, an oblong dark grey spot above the dorsum near the base, and a mark above it. A semi-oval suffused dark grey patch extends along the dorsum from one-third to four-fifths and reaching half across the wing, edged above in the middle by an elongate black mark. There is an elongate dark grey spot in the disc at three-fourths, terminated anteriorly by a small blackish dot. The apical area is mostly suffused dark grey. The hindwings are thinly scaled, light grey, with the veins and termen suffused darker grey.
