= Anarsia stylota =

Scientific classification
- Kingdom: Animalia
- Phylum: Arthropoda
- Class: Insecta
- Order: Lepidoptera
- Family: Gelechiidae
- Genus: Anarsia
- Species: A. stylota

Binomial name
- Anarsia stylota Meyrick, 1913

Species of moth

Anarsia stylota is a moth of the family Gelechiidae. It was described by Edward Meyrick in 1913. It is found in Sri Lanka.

The wingspan is 15–16 mm. The forewings are ochreous white with black markings. There are five spots at equal distances along the costa, and one at the apex, three subdorsal spots on the anterior half and a three-lobed mark in the disc before the middle, tending to be connected with the third costal and subdorsal spots. There is an inverted V-shaped mark in the disc beyond two-thirds. There is also a spot on dorsum at three-fourths, and one on the termen above the tornus. The hindwings are grey, but lighter and thinly scaled anteriorly.
