= Anarsia libanoticella =

Scientific classification
- Domain: Eukaryota
- Kingdom: Animalia
- Phylum: Arthropoda
- Class: Insecta
- Order: Lepidoptera
- Family: Gelechiidae
- Genus: Anarsia
- Species: A. libanoticella

Binomial name
- Anarsia libanoticella Amsel, 1967

Species of moth

Anarsia libanoticella is a moth in the family Gelechiidae. It was described by Hans Georg Amsel in 1967. It is found in Lebanon.
