= Anarsia bipinnata =

Scientific classification
- Kingdom: Animalia
- Phylum: Arthropoda
- Class: Insecta
- Order: Lepidoptera
- Family: Gelechiidae
- Genus: Anarsia
- Species: A. bipinnata

Binomial name
- Anarsia bipinnata (Meyrick, 1932)

Synonyms
- Chelaria bipinnata Meyrick, 1932

Species of moth

Anarsia bipinnata is a moth in the family Gelechiidae. It was described by Edward Meyrick in 1932. It is found in the Russian Far East, Korea and Japan.

The larvae feed on Elaeagnus multiflora, Elaeagnus umbellata, Acer ginnala and Quercus species.
