= Anarsia anisodonta =

Scientific classification
- Domain: Eukaryota
- Kingdom: Animalia
- Phylum: Arthropoda
- Class: Insecta
- Order: Lepidoptera
- Family: Gelechiidae
- Genus: Anarsia
- Species: A. anisodonta

Binomial name
- Anarsia anisodonta Diakonoff, 1954

Species of moth

Anarsia anisodonta is a moth of the family Gelechiidae. It was described by Alexey Diakonoff in 1954. It is found in New Guinea and Queensland.

Adults have grey forewings with a triangular black mark on the costa.
