= Anarsia carbonaria =

Scientific classification
- Kingdom: Animalia
- Phylum: Arthropoda
- Clade: Pancrustacea
- Class: Insecta
- Order: Lepidoptera
- Family: Gelechiidae
- Genus: Anarsia
- Species: A. carbonaria

Binomial name
- Anarsia carbonaria Meyrick, 1913

Species of moth

Anarsia carbonaria is a moth of the family Gelechiidae. It was described by Edward Meyrick in 1913. It is found in South Africa and Zimbabwe.

The wingspan is 14–15 mm. The forewings are dark grey irregularly irrorated (sprinkled) with white, with scattered black scales. The basal half with several small scattered suffused blackish spots and there is an irregular transverse black blotch on the middle of the costa reaching two-thirds across the wing, followed by a patch of light grey suffusion with stronger white irroration extended to the tornus. There is also an oval black spot in the disc at three-fourths and an oblique black mark between this and the costa posteriorly, surrounded with dark suffusion. There are also several suffused black dots towards the costa posteriorly and the termen. The hindwings are grey, paler and thinly scaled anteriorly.
