= Anarsia incerta =

Scientific classification
- Domain: Eukaryota
- Kingdom: Animalia
- Phylum: Arthropoda
- Class: Insecta
- Order: Lepidoptera
- Family: Gelechiidae
- Genus: Anarsia
- Species: A. incerta

Binomial name
- Anarsia incerta Ueda, 1997

Species of moth

Anarsia incerta is a moth in the family Gelechiidae. It was described by Ueda in 1997. It is found in Japan (Ryukyus).

The length of the forewings is 4.7–5.7 mm for males and 4.7–6.6 mm for females.
