= Anarsia largimacularis =

Scientific classification
- Domain: Eukaryota
- Kingdom: Animalia
- Phylum: Arthropoda
- Class: Insecta
- Order: Lepidoptera
- Family: Gelechiidae
- Genus: Anarsia
- Species: A. largimacularis

Binomial name
- Anarsia largimacularis H.-H. Li & Z.-M. Zheng, 1997

Species of moth

Anarsia largimacularis is a moth in the family Gelechiidae. It was described by Hou-Hun Li and Zhe-Min Zheng in 1997. It is found in China.
