= Anarsia patulella =

Scientific classification
- Kingdom: Animalia
- Phylum: Arthropoda
- Clade: Pancrustacea
- Class: Insecta
- Order: Lepidoptera
- Family: Gelechiidae
- Genus: Anarsia
- Species: A. patulella

Binomial name
- Anarsia patulella (Walker, 1864)

Synonyms
- Gelechia patulella Walker, 1864

Species of moth

Anarsia patulella is a moth of the family Gelechiidae. It was first described by Francis Walker in 1864 as Gelechia patulella. It is found in India, Sri Lanka, Thailand, Vietnam, mainland China, Taiwan, Japan and Australia.

The wingspan is 10–11 mm.

The larvae feed on Prunus salicina and Nephelium species.
