= Anarsia aleurodes =

Scientific classification
- Kingdom: Animalia
- Phylum: Arthropoda
- Class: Insecta
- Order: Lepidoptera
- Family: Gelechiidae
- Genus: Anarsia
- Species: A. aleurodes

Binomial name
- Anarsia aleurodes Meyrick, 1922

Species of moth

Anarsia aleurodes is a moth in the family Gelechiidae. It was described by Edward Meyrick in 1922. It is found in Iraq.

The wingspan is about 12 mm. The forewings are ochreous-whitish, thinly and irregularly speckled grey, with a small undefined spot of blackish-grey speckling on the middle of the costa and some irregular blackish-grey speckling in the middle of the disc. There are also slight blackish dots on the tornus and on the termen beneath the apex. The hindwings are light grey, subhyaline and whitish-tinged anteriorly.
