= Anarsia didymopa =

Scientific classification
- Kingdom: Animalia
- Phylum: Arthropoda
- Class: Insecta
- Order: Lepidoptera
- Family: Gelechiidae
- Genus: Anarsia
- Species: A. didymopa

Binomial name
- Anarsia didymopa Meyrick, 1916

Species of moth

Anarsia didymopa is a moth in the family Gelechiidae. It was described by Edward Meyrick in 1916. It is found in India (Bengal) and Thailand.

The wingspan is about 9 mm. The forewings are grey, irrorated (sprinkled) with white and sprinkled with blackish. There is a black dot on the base of the costa and a short fine black dash towards the costa near the base. There is also a semi-oval dark fuscous spot on the middle of the costa, as well as two cloudy dots before and two beyond this. There is an indistinct blackish dash in the middle of the disc. The hindwings are grey and hyaline (glass like) on the basal half except on the veins.
