= Anarsia valvata =

Scientific classification
- Domain: Eukaryota
- Kingdom: Animalia
- Phylum: Arthropoda
- Class: Insecta
- Order: Lepidoptera
- Family: Gelechiidae
- Genus: Anarsia
- Species: A. valvata

Binomial name
- Anarsia valvata Rose and Pathania, 2003

Species of moth

Anarsia valvata is a moth in the family Gelechiidae. It was described by Rose and Pathania in 2003. It is found in India (Himachal Pradesh).
