= Anarsia lewvanichae =

Scientific classification
- Kingdom: Animalia
- Phylum: Arthropoda
- Class: Insecta
- Order: Lepidoptera
- Family: Gelechiidae
- Genus: Anarsia
- Species: A. lewvanichae

Binomial name
- Anarsia lewvanichae Park & Ponomarenko, 1996

Species of moth

Anarsia lewvanichae is a moth in the family Gelechiidae. It was described by Kyu-Tek Park and Margarita Gennadievna Ponomarenko in 1996. It is found in Thailand.

The wingspan is about 10.5 mm.
