= Anarsia spatulana =

Scientific classification
- Kingdom: Animalia
- Phylum: Arthropoda
- Class: Insecta
- Order: Lepidoptera
- Family: Gelechiidae
- Genus: Anarsia
- Species: A. spatulana

Binomial name
- Anarsia spatulana Park & Ponomarenko, 1996

Species of moth

Anarsia spatulana is a moth in the family Gelechiidae. It was described by Kyu-Tek Park and Margarita Gennadievna Ponomarenko in 1996. It is found in Thailand.

The wingspan is 17–18 mm.
