= Anarsia spicata =

Scientific classification
- Kingdom: Animalia
- Phylum: Arthropoda
- Class: Insecta
- Order: Lepidoptera
- Family: Gelechiidae
- Genus: Anarsia
- Species: A. spicata

Binomial name
- Anarsia spicata Meyrick, 1918

Species of moth

Anarsia spicata is a moth of the family Gelechiidae. It was described by Edward Meyrick in 1918. It is found in Mozambique and South Africa.

The wingspan is 13–14 mm. The forewings are grey irrorated (sprinkled) with whitish, with some scattered dark grey and blackish scales. There is a thick black submedian streak from the base to the middle, attenuated to a point, a median streak attenuated at both ends from before the middle of the disc to four-fifths, and an oblique dash from above the apex of this to the costa before the apex. The hindwings are grey, paler and thinly scaled anteriorly.
