= Anarsia sibirica =

Scientific classification
- Kingdom: Animalia
- Phylum: Arthropoda
- Clade: Pancrustacea
- Class: Insecta
- Order: Lepidoptera
- Family: Gelechiidae
- Genus: Anarsia
- Species: A. sibirica

Binomial name
- Anarsia sibirica Park & Ponomarenko, 1996

Species of moth

Anarsia sibirica is a moth of the family Gelechiidae. It is native to Russia (in the southern Ural and Siberia).
