= Anarsia malagasyella =

Scientific classification
- Kingdom: Animalia
- Phylum: Arthropoda
- Class: Insecta
- Order: Lepidoptera
- Family: Gelechiidae
- Genus: Anarsia
- Species: A. malagasyella

Binomial name
- Anarsia malagasyella Viette, 1968

Species of moth

Anarsia malagasyella is a moth of the family Gelechiidae. It was described by Viette in 1968. It is found in Madagascar.
