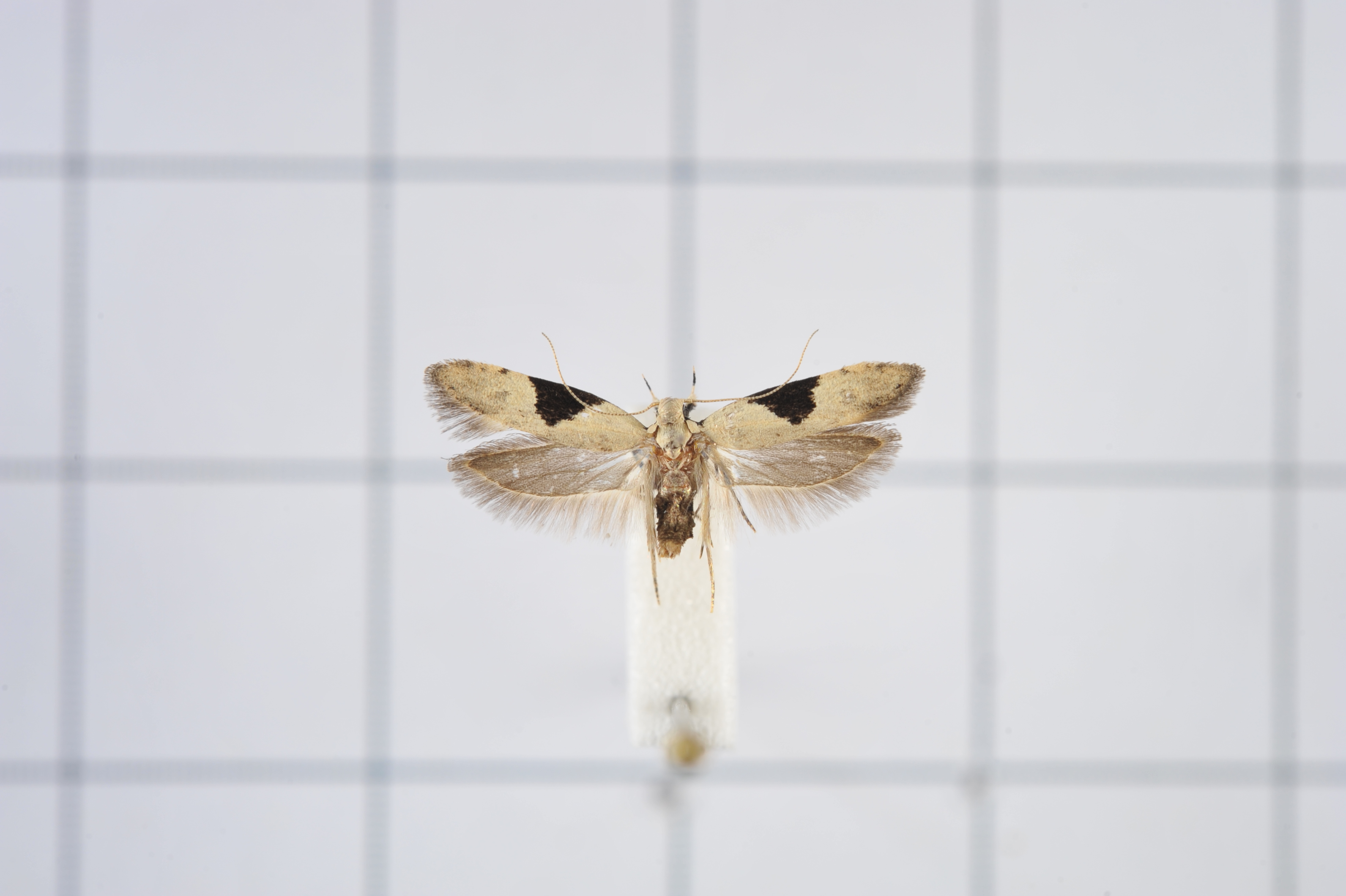

Scientific classification
- Kingdom: Animalia
- Phylum: Arthropoda
- Class: Insecta
- Order: Lepidoptera
- Family: Gelechiidae
- Genus: Anarsia
- Species: A. tricornis

Binomial name
- Anarsia tricornis Meyrick, 1913

Synonyms
- Ananarsia tricornis

= Anarsia tricornis =

Species of moth

Anarsia tricornis is a moth of the family Gelechiidae. It was described by Edward Meyrick in 1913. It is found in Sri Lanka and Thailand.

The wingspan is 11–14 mm (0.43–0.55 in). There is a triangular black blotch occupying nearly the whole median third of the costa on the forewings, reaching three-fourths across the wing. There are several variable small spots of blackish irroration (sprinkles) around the posterior part of the costa and termen. The hindwings are grey, thinly scaled and semihyaline (partially glass like) towards the base and darker towards the apex.
