= Anarsia lechriosema =

Scientific classification
- Domain: Eukaryota
- Kingdom: Animalia
- Phylum: Arthropoda
- Class: Insecta
- Order: Lepidoptera
- Family: Gelechiidae
- Genus: Anarsia
- Species: A. lechriosema

Binomial name
- Anarsia lechriosema Bradley, 1982

Species of moth

Anarsia lechriosema is a moth in the family Gelechiidae. It was described by John David Bradley in 1982. It is found on Norfolk Island.
