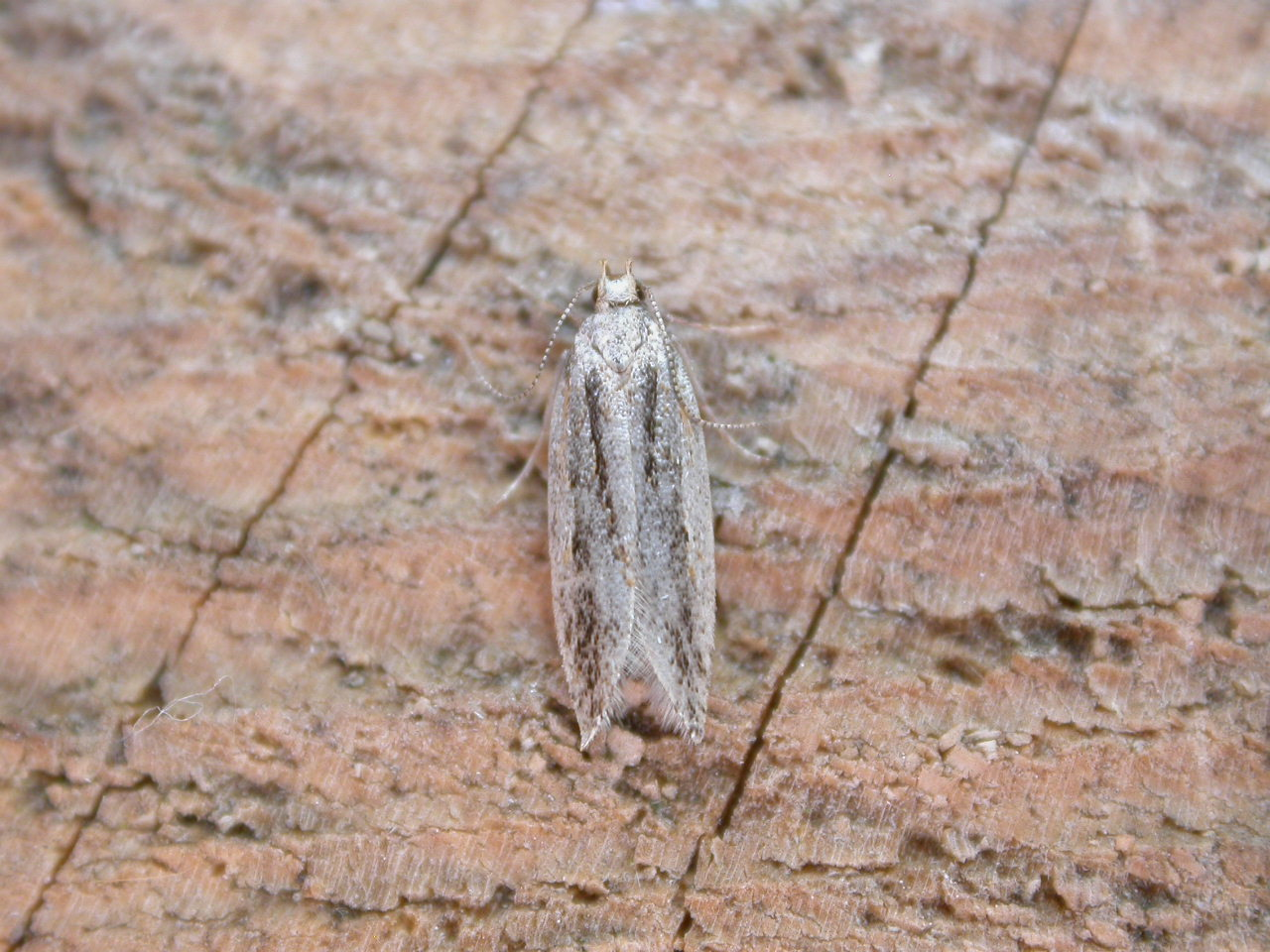

Scientific classification
- Domain: Eukaryota
- Kingdom: Animalia
- Phylum: Arthropoda
- Class: Insecta
- Order: Lepidoptera
- Family: Gelechiidae
- Genus: Anarsia
- Species: A. lineatella

Binomial name
- Anarsia lineatella Zeller, 1839

Synonyms
- Tinea pullatella Hübner, 1796; Anarsia pruniella Clemens, 1860; Ananarsia lineatella heratella Amsel, 1967; Ananarsia lineatella tauricella Amsel, 1967

= Anarsia lineatella =

Peach twig borer

Moth of the family Gelechiidae from Europe

Anarsia lineatella, the peach twig borer, is a moth of the family Gelechiidae. It is commonly found in Europe, but was introduced to California in the 1880s.

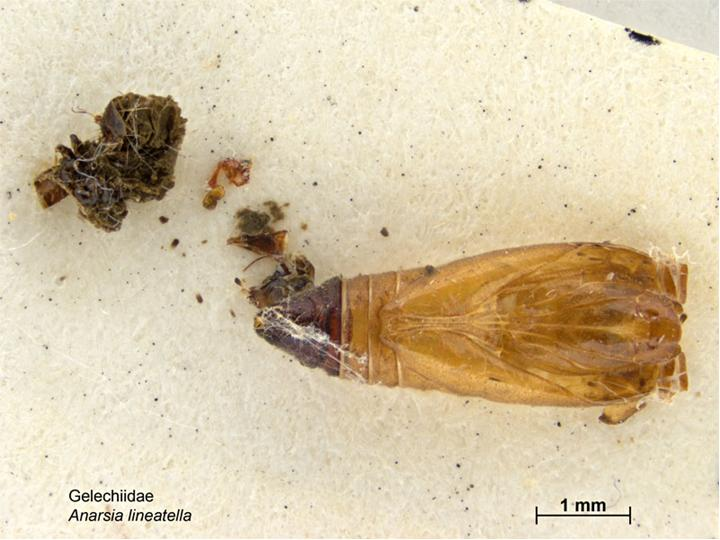
Cocoon

The wingspan is 11–14 mm. The moths are on wing from June to August depending on the location.

The larvae feed on Prunus species, including Prunus avium, Prunus spinosa, Prunus domestica and Prunus insititia. In California, A. lineatella is a significant pest of local almond plantations.
