= Anarsia acerata =

Scientific classification
- Kingdom: Animalia
- Phylum: Arthropoda
- Class: Insecta
- Order: Lepidoptera
- Family: Gelechiidae
- Genus: Anarsia
- Species: A. acerata

Binomial name
- Anarsia acerata Meyrick, 1913

Species of moth

Anarsia acerata is a moth in the family Gelechiidae. It was described by Edward Meyrick in 1913. It is found in southern India and northern Vietnam.

The wingspan is 10–12 mm. The forewings are fuscous irregularly mixed and irrorated (sprinkled) with whitish. There are about six small dark fuscous spots or marks along the costa, one beyond the middle larger. The dorsal area is irregularly suffused with dark fuscous throughout, especially a transverse dark fuscous spot at one-fourth, edged posteriorly with whitish suffusion. There is an undefined elongate patch of dark fuscous suffusion in the middle of the disc and some irregular brown or fuscous marking towards the apex. The hindwings are subhyaline (almost glass like), suffused with fuscous along the termen and towards the apex, with the veins dark fuscous.
