= Anarsia anthracaula =

Scientific classification
- Kingdom: Animalia
- Phylum: Arthropoda
- Class: Insecta
- Order: Lepidoptera
- Family: Gelechiidae
- Genus: Anarsia
- Species: A. anthracaula

Binomial name
- Anarsia anthracaula Meyrick, 1929

Species of moth

Anarsia anthracaula is a moth in the family Gelechiidae. It was described by Edward Meyrick in 1929. It is found on the New Hebrides.
