= Anarsia nigricana =

Scientific classification
- Kingdom: Animalia
- Phylum: Arthropoda
- Clade: Pancrustacea
- Class: Insecta
- Order: Lepidoptera
- Family: Gelechiidae
- Genus: Anarsia
- Species: A. nigricana

Binomial name
- Anarsia nigricana Park, 1991

Species of moth

Anarsia nigricana is a moth of the family Gelechiidae. It was described by Kyu-Tek Park in 1991.

== Distribution ==
It is found in Korea.

The larvae feed on Glycine max.
