= Anarsia vinsonella =

Scientific classification
- Kingdom: Animalia
- Phylum: Arthropoda
- Class: Insecta
- Order: Lepidoptera
- Family: Gelechiidae
- Genus: Anarsia
- Species: A. vinsonella

Binomial name
- Anarsia vinsonella Viette, 1957

Species of moth

Anarsia vinsonella is a moth of the family Gelechiidae. It is found on Mauritius and Réunion in the Indian Ocean.
