= Anarsia sthenarota =

Scientific classification
- Kingdom: Animalia
- Phylum: Arthropoda
- Class: Insecta
- Order: Lepidoptera
- Family: Gelechiidae
- Genus: Anarsia
- Species: A. sthenarota

Binomial name
- Anarsia sthenarota Meyrick, 1926

Species of moth

Anarsia sthenarota is a moth in the family Gelechiidae. It was described by Edward Meyrick in 1926. It is found on Borneo.
