= Anarsia leberonella =

Scientific classification
- Domain: Eukaryota
- Kingdom: Animalia
- Phylum: Arthropoda
- Class: Insecta
- Order: Lepidoptera
- Family: Gelechiidae
- Genus: Anarsia
- Species: A. leberonella

Binomial name
- Anarsia leberonella Real, 1994

Species of moth

Anarsia leberonella is a moth of the family Gelechiidae. It is found in France.
