= Anarsia silvosa =

Scientific classification
- Kingdom: Animalia
- Phylum: Arthropoda
- Class: Insecta
- Order: Lepidoptera
- Family: Gelechiidae
- Genus: Anarsia
- Species: A. silvosa

Binomial name
- Anarsia silvosa Ueda, 1997

Species of moth

Anarsia silvosa is a moth in the family Gelechiidae. It was described by Tatsuya Ueda in 1997. It is found in Japan (Honshu, Kyushu).

The length of the forewings is 6.6–7.5 mm for males and 7.3 mm for females.
