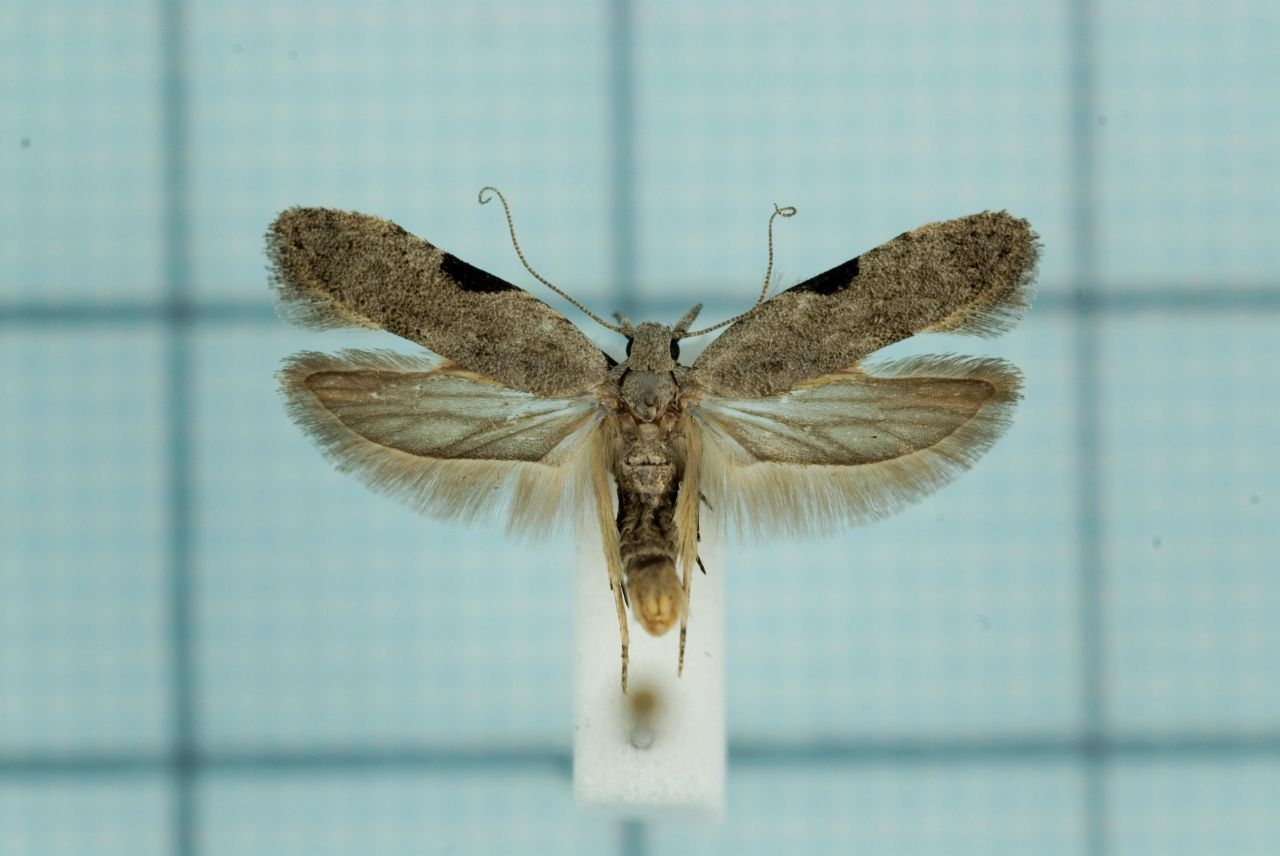

Scientific classification
- Kingdom: Animalia
- Phylum: Arthropoda
- Class: Insecta
- Order: Lepidoptera
- Family: Gelechiidae
- Genus: Anarsia
- Species: A. euphorodes

Binomial name
- Anarsia euphorodes Meyrick, 1922

= Anarsia euphorodes =

Species of moth

Anarsia euphorodes is a moth of the family Gelechiidae. It is found in China and Taiwan.

The wingspan is about 12 mm. The forewings are ochreous-whitish, thinly and irregularly speckled with grey and with a small undefined spot of blackish-grey speckling on the middle of the costa. There are some irregular blackish-grey speckling in the middle of the disc, as well as some slight blackish dots on the tornus and on the termen beneath the apex. The hindwings are light grey, subhyaline and whitish-tinged anteriorly.
