= Anarsia bilbainella =

Scientific classification
- Domain: Eukaryota
- Kingdom: Animalia
- Phylum: Arthropoda
- Class: Insecta
- Order: Lepidoptera
- Family: Gelechiidae
- Genus: Anarsia
- Species: A. bilbainella

Binomial name
- Anarsia bilbainella (Rössler, 1877)

Synonyms
- Nothris bilbainella Rössler, 1877; Anarsia bizensis Réal, 1994; Anarsia burmanni Amsel, 1958; Anarsia infundibulella Réal, 1994; Anarsia ovilella Réal, 1994

Species of moth

Anarsia bilbainella is a moth of the family Gelechiidae. It is found in France, Portugal and Spain.
