= Anarsia choana =

Scientific classification
- Kingdom: Animalia
- Phylum: Arthropoda
- Clade: Pancrustacea
- Class: Insecta
- Order: Lepidoptera
- Family: Gelechiidae
- Genus: Anarsia
- Species: A. choana

Binomial name
- Anarsia choana Park, 1995

Species of moth

Anarsia choana is a moth of the family Gelechiidae. It was described by Kyu-Tek Park in 1995. It is found in Taiwan and Japan (Ryukyus).

The length of the moth's forewings is 4.5–4.7 millimetres (0.18–0.19 in).
