= Anarsia meiosis =

Scientific classification
- Kingdom: Animalia
- Phylum: Arthropoda
- Class: Insecta
- Order: Lepidoptera
- Family: Gelechiidae
- Genus: Anarsia
- Species: A. meiosis

Binomial name
- Anarsia meiosis Park & Ponomarenko, 1996

Species of moth

Anarsia meiosis is a moth in the family Gelechiidae. Park and Ponomarenko described it in 1996. It is found in Thailand.

The wingspan is about 11 mm.
