= Anarsia pinnata =

Scientific classification
- Kingdom: Animalia
- Phylum: Arthropoda
- Class: Insecta
- Order: Lepidoptera
- Family: Gelechiidae
- Genus: Anarsia
- Species: A. pinnata

Binomial name
- Anarsia pinnata Meyrick, 1931

Species of moth

Anarsia pinnata is a moth of the family Gelechiidae. It was described by Edward Meyrick in 1931. It is found in Cameroon.
