= Anarsia idioptila =

Scientific classification
- Kingdom: Animalia
- Phylum: Arthropoda
- Class: Insecta
- Order: Lepidoptera
- Family: Gelechiidae
- Genus: Anarsia
- Species: A. idioptila

Binomial name
- Anarsia idioptila Meyrick, 1916

Species of moth

Anarsia idioptila is a moth in the family Gelechiidae. It was described by Edward Meyrick in 1916. It is found in Bengal.

The wingspan is about 10 mm. The forewings are grey, irregularly sprinkled with blackish, and sprinkled with whitish towards the costa and on the posterior half. There are five oblique dark fuscous marks on the costa from one-fifth to three-fourths, the median largest. There is a blackish dot towards the costa near the base and a short subcostal line of black scales about one-third. An indistinct blackish dash is found in the middle of the disc. The hindwings are grey, thinly scaled and subhyaline (almost glass like) except towards the apex and termen.
