= Anarsia triglypta =

Scientific classification
- Kingdom: Animalia
- Phylum: Arthropoda
- Class: Insecta
- Order: Lepidoptera
- Family: Gelechiidae
- Genus: Anarsia
- Species: A. triglypta

Binomial name
- Anarsia triglypta Meyrick, 1933

Species of moth

Anarsia triglypta is a moth in the family Gelechiidae. It was described by Edward Meyrick in 1933. It is found in north-eastern India.

The larvae feed on the leaves of Senegalia catechu.
