= Anarsia mitescens =

Scientific classification
- Kingdom: Animalia
- Phylum: Arthropoda
- Class: Insecta
- Order: Lepidoptera
- Family: Gelechiidae
- Genus: Anarsia
- Species: A. mitescens

Binomial name
- Anarsia mitescens Meyrick, 1913

Species of moth

Anarsia mitescens is a moth of the family Gelechiidae. It was described by Edward Meyrick in 1913. It is found in South Africa.

The wingspan is about 13 mm. The forewings are light grey irrorated (sprinkled) with whitish, with a few scattered black scales and an elongate dark grey spot in the middle of the costa, preceded by two small cloudy blackish spots and followed by two others. There is a black dot beneath the costa near the base, one on the fold at two-thirds, one rather large in the disc before the middle, one on the lower edge of the median costal spot, one beneath the costa at two-thirds, one in the disc at two-thirds, one above the dorsum before the tornus, and several small groups of black scales towards the apex. The hindwings are rather dark grey.
