= Anarsia sciotona =

Scientific classification
- Kingdom: Animalia
- Phylum: Arthropoda
- Clade: Pancrustacea
- Class: Insecta
- Order: Lepidoptera
- Family: Gelechiidae
- Genus: Anarsia
- Species: A. sciotona

Binomial name
- Anarsia sciotona Meyrick, 1927

Species of moth

Anarsia sciotona is a moth of the family Gelechiidae. It was described by Edward Meyrick in 1927. It is found in South Africa.

The larvae feed on the fruit of Mimusops capensis.
