= Anarsia ulmarata =

Scientific classification
- Domain: Eukaryota
- Kingdom: Animalia
- Phylum: Arthropoda
- Class: Insecta
- Order: Lepidoptera
- Family: Gelechiidae
- Genus: Anarsia
- Species: A. ulmarata

Binomial name
- Anarsia ulmarata Bradley, 1961

Species of moth

Anarsia ulmarata is a moth in the family Gelechiidae. It was described by John David Bradley in 1961. It is found on Guadalcanal.
