= Anarsia eleagnella =

Scientific classification
- Domain: Eukaryota
- Kingdom: Animalia
- Phylum: Arthropoda
- Class: Insecta
- Order: Lepidoptera
- Family: Gelechiidae
- Genus: Anarsia
- Species: A. eleagnella

Binomial name
- Anarsia eleagnella Kuznetsov, 1957

Species of moth

Anarsia eleagnella is a moth of the family Gelechiidae. It is found in Hungary, Romania, Ukraine, Russia, Transcaucasia, Turkmenistan, Kazakhstan and Afghanistan.

The larvae feed on Elaeagnus species.
