= Anarsia phortica =

Scientific classification
- Kingdom: Animalia
- Phylum: Arthropoda
- Class: Insecta
- Order: Lepidoptera
- Family: Gelechiidae
- Genus: Anarsia
- Species: A. phortica

Binomial name
- Anarsia phortica Meyrick, 1913

Species of moth

Anarsia phortica is a moth of the family Gelechiidae. It was described by Edward Meyrick in 1913. It is found in southern India, Sri Lanka, Thailand and on Borneo.

The wingspan is 13–15 mm. The forewings are white, irregularly mixed with grey and with a dark grey median band extending from one-fourth to three-fifths, widest on the dorsum, the posterior two-thirds of this band occupied by a black blotch reaching from the costa to the fold. There is also an irregular dark grey apical patch. The hindwings are grey, but iridescent-hyaline in the disc and towards the base, while the veins and termen are dark grey.
