= Anarsia nigrimacula =

Scientific classification
- Kingdom: Animalia
- Phylum: Arthropoda
- Clade: Pancrustacea
- Class: Insecta
- Order: Lepidoptera
- Family: Gelechiidae
- Genus: Anarsia
- Species: A. nigrimacula

Binomial name
- Anarsia nigrimacula Janse, 1949

Species of moth

Anarsia nigrimacula is a moth of the family Gelechiidae. It was described by Anthonie Johannes Theodorus Janse in 1949. It is found in South Africa.
