= Anarsia antisaris =

Scientific classification
- Kingdom: Animalia
- Phylum: Arthropoda
- Class: Insecta
- Order: Lepidoptera
- Family: Gelechiidae
- Genus: Anarsia
- Species: A. antisaris

Binomial name
- Anarsia antisaris (Meyrick, 1913)

Synonyms
- Chelaria antisaris Meyrick, 1913

Species of moth

Anarsia antisaris is a moth of the family Gelechiidae. It was described by Edward Meyrick in 1913. It is found in South Africa.

The wingspan is about 14 mm. The forewings are pale greyish-ochreous irregularly and suffusedly irrorated with grey and with an indistinct blackish dot beneath the costa near the base. There is an irregular patch of fuscous suffusion partially sprinkled with blackish in the disc before the middle, extended over the costal two-thirds of the wing from the middle to the apex, with raised spots of grey and whitish irroration on the fold before the middle of the wing, and above the tornus. A curved-bent transverse line of silvery irroration is found towards the apex, and another around the apex. The hindwings are rather dark grey, with a pale subhyaline longitudinal median streak.
