= Anarsia geminella =

Scientific classification
- Kingdom: Animalia
- Phylum: Arthropoda
- Clade: Pancrustacea
- Class: Insecta
- Order: Lepidoptera
- Family: Gelechiidae
- Genus: Anarsia
- Species: A. geminella

Binomial name
- Anarsia geminella Amsel, 1967

Species of moth

Anarsia geminella is a moth in the family Gelechiidae. It was described by Hans Georg Amsel in 1967, and is found in Afghanistan.
