= Anarsia acaciae =

Scientific classification
- Kingdom: Animalia
- Phylum: Arthropoda
- Clade: Pancrustacea
- Class: Insecta
- Order: Lepidoptera
- Family: Gelechiidae
- Genus: Anarsia
- Species: A. acaciae

Binomial name
- Anarsia acaciae Walsingham, 1896

Species of moth

Anarsia acaciae is a moth of the family Gelechiidae. It is found on the Canary Islands, Algeria, Israel and south-western Arabia.

The wingspan is about 13 mm. The forewings are hoary greyish with numerous short longitudinal streaks of greyish fuscous intermixed with lighter and darker shades of the ground colour. The hindwings are shining, somewhat iridescent, bluish grey.

The larvae feed within the seedpods of Acacia edgworthii and Acacia farnesiana.
