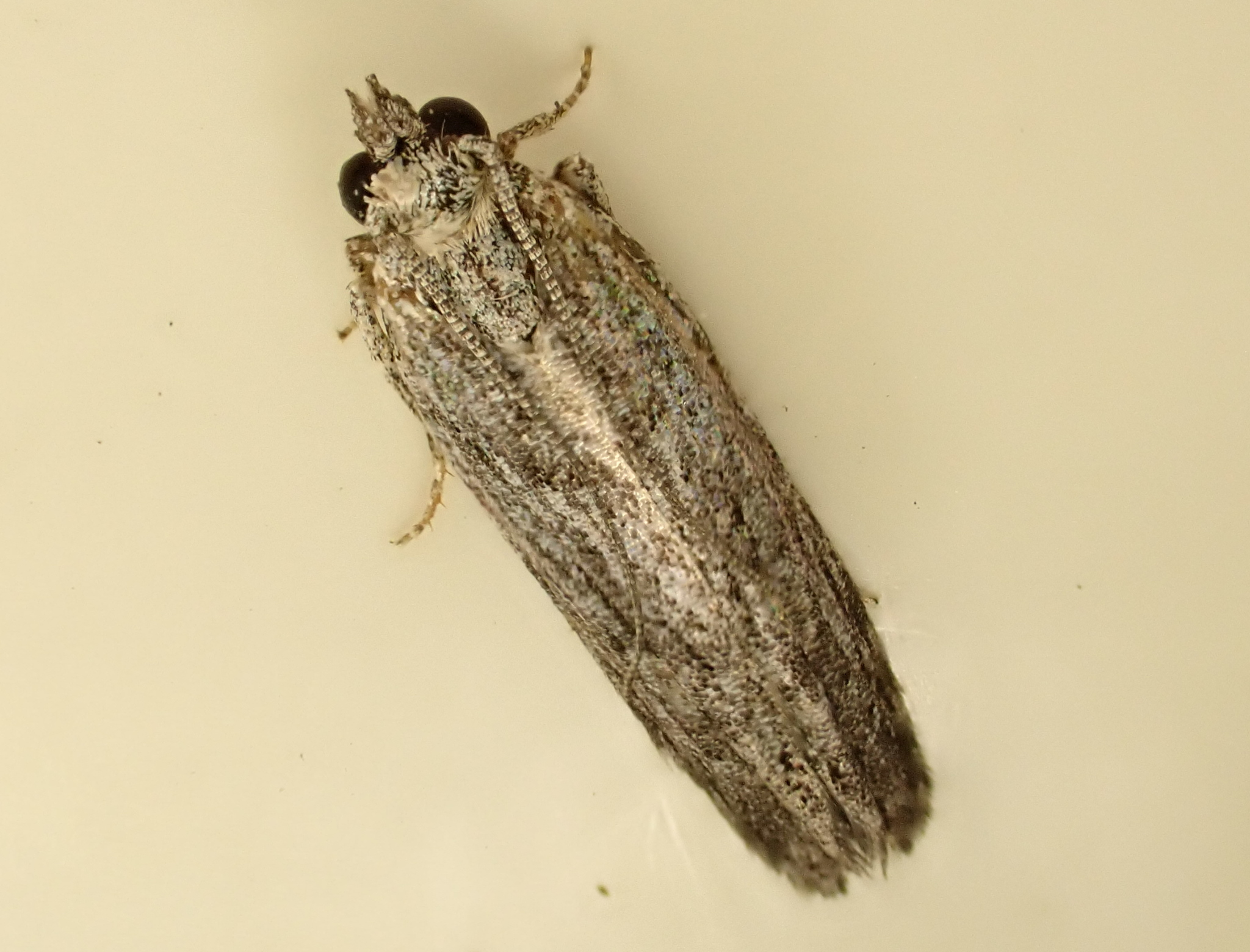

Scientific classification
- Domain: Eukaryota
- Kingdom: Animalia
- Phylum: Arthropoda
- Class: Insecta
- Order: Lepidoptera
- Family: Gelechiidae
- Genus: Anarsia
- Species: A. dryinopa

Binomial name
- Anarsia dryinopa Lower, 1897

Synonyms
- Anarsia trichodeta Meyrick, 1904; Izatha griseata Hudson, 1939

= Anarsia dryinopa =

Species of moth

Anarsia dryinopa is a moth of the family Gelechiidae. This species was first described by Oswald Bertram Lower in 1897. It is native to Australia and was introduced to New Zealand where it can be found in both the North and the South Islands.

== Taxonomy ==
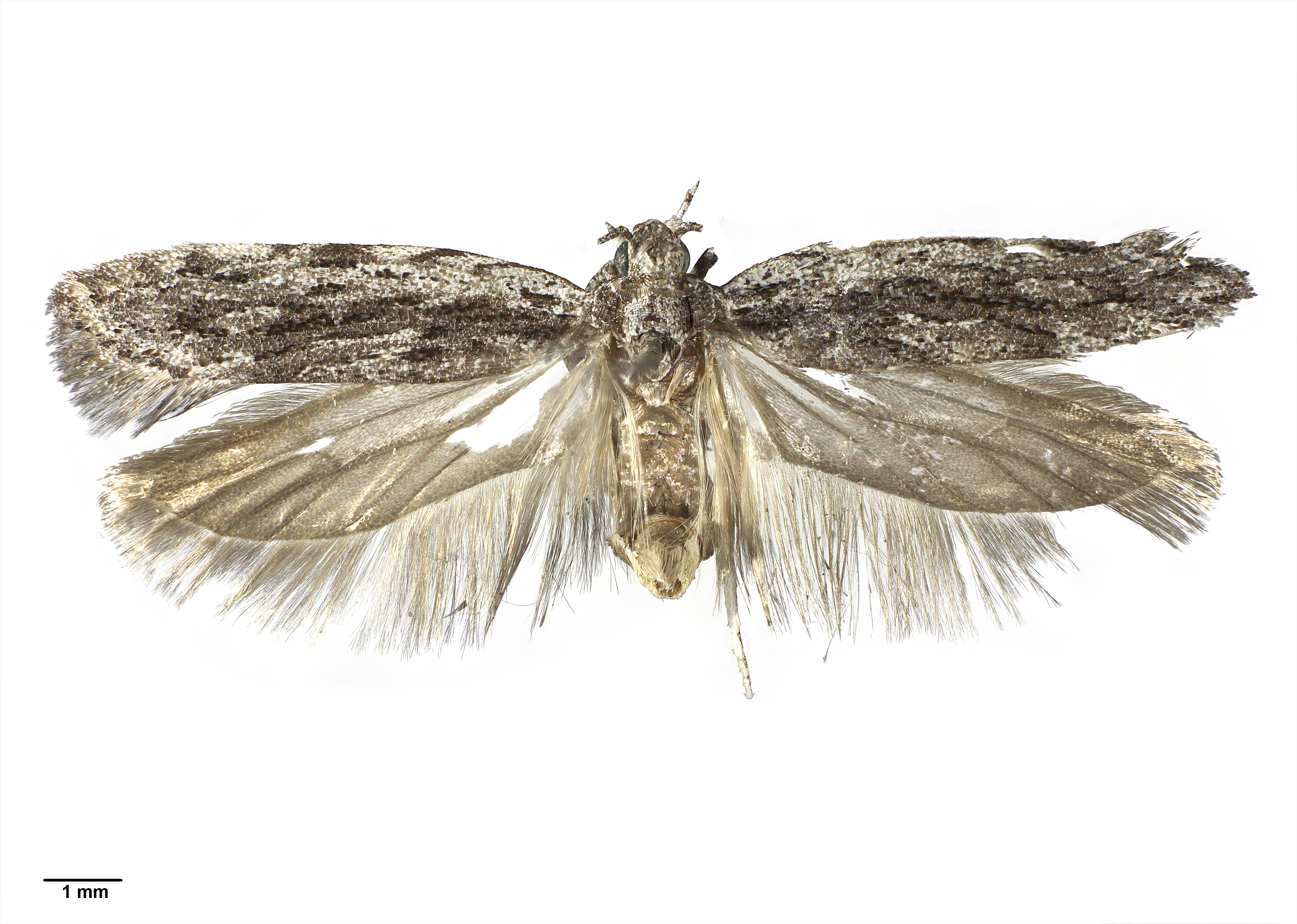
Holotype specimen of Izatha griseata

This species was first described in 1897 by Oswald Bertram Lower using a specimen collected at Broken Hill in New South Wales in June. In 1904 Edward Meyrick, thinking he was describing a new species named this species Anarsia trichodeta. This was synonymised by E. D. Edwards in 1996. In 1939 George Hudson described this species as Izatha griseata. In 2010 Robert Hoare synonymised Izatha griseata with this species.

== Description ==
The wingspan is 14–17 mm (0.55–0.67 in). The forewings are rather dark fuscous, irregularly irrorated (speckled) with white and with several small undefined dark spots on the costa. There are numerous scattered undefined dots and dashes of black scales irrorated with whitish. The hindwings are fuscous, thinly scaled and semitransparent towards base, darker posteriorly.

== Distribution ==
This species is native to Australia. It has been introduced to New Zealand and has been observed in the Northland, Auckland and Nelson regions.

== Host species ==
The larvae have been recorded feeding on the phyllodes and in galls on Acacia species in Australia, and in New Zealand they have been reared from the foliage of Acacia longifolia, Acacia melanoxylon and Albizzia julibrissin.
