= Anarsia asymmetrodes =

Scientific classification
- Kingdom: Animalia
- Phylum: Arthropoda
- Clade: Pancrustacea
- Class: Insecta
- Order: Lepidoptera
- Family: Gelechiidae
- Genus: Anarsia
- Species: A. asymmetrodes

Binomial name
- Anarsia asymmetrodes Park, 2014 in Bae et al., 2014

Species of moth

Anarsia asymmetrodes is a moth in the family Gelechiidae. It was described by Kyu-Tek Park in 2014. It is found in Korea, where it has been recorded from the island of Baengnyeongdo.

The wingspan is 14–15 mm.

== Etymology ==
The species name is derived from the Greek asymmetros (meaning without symmetry) with the Greek suffix -odes.
