= Anarsia stepposella =

Scientific classification
- Kingdom: Animalia
- Phylum: Arthropoda
- Clade: Pancrustacea
- Class: Insecta
- Order: Lepidoptera
- Family: Gelechiidae
- Genus: Anarsia
- Species: A. stepposella

Binomial name
- Anarsia stepposella Ponomarenko, 2002

Species of moth

Anarsia stepposella is a moth in the family Gelechiidae. It was described by Ponomarenko in 2002. It is found in Russia (Tuva) and north-western Kazakhstan.
