= Anarsia chaonella =

Scientific classification
- Kingdom: Animalia
- Phylum: Arthropoda
- Clade: Pancrustacea
- Class: Insecta
- Order: Lepidoptera
- Family: Gelechiidae
- Genus: Anarsia
- Species: A. chaonella

Binomial name
- Anarsia chaonella Park, 1995

Species of moth

Anarsia chaonella is a moth in the family Gelechiidae. It was described by Kyu-Tek Park in 1995. It is found in Taiwan.
