= Anarsia amegarta =

Scientific classification
- Kingdom: Animalia
- Phylum: Arthropoda
- Class: Insecta
- Order: Lepidoptera
- Family: Gelechiidae
- Genus: Anarsia
- Species: A. amegarta

Binomial name
- Anarsia amegarta Meyrick, 1933

Species of moth

Anarsia amegarta is a moth in the family Gelechiidae. It was described by Edward Meyrick in 1933. It is found in Indonesia (Java).

The larvae feed on Albizzia species.
