= Anarsia sagmatica =

Scientific classification
- Kingdom: Animalia
- Phylum: Arthropoda
- Class: Insecta
- Order: Lepidoptera
- Family: Gelechiidae
- Genus: Anarsia
- Species: A. sagmatica

Binomial name
- Anarsia sagmatica Meyrick, 1916

Species of moth

Anarsia sagmatica is a moth in the family Gelechiidae. It was described by Edward Meyrick in 1916. It is found in north-western India.

The wingspan is about 13 mm. The forewings are grey, finely whitish sprinkled, with some scattered dark grey and blackish scales and a transverse black blotch from the middle of the costa reaching two-thirds across the wing, rather irregular edged, the apex connected with the dorsum by some dark grey suffusion. The hindwings are grey suffused with dark fuscous on the veins, towards the apex, and along the termen, subhyaline (almost glass like) in the disc and towards the base.
