= Anarsia dejoannisi =

Scientific classification
- Domain: Eukaryota
- Kingdom: Animalia
- Phylum: Arthropoda
- Class: Insecta
- Order: Lepidoptera
- Family: Gelechiidae
- Genus: Anarsia
- Species: A. dejoannisi

Binomial name
- Anarsia dejoannisi Réal, 1994

Species of moth

Anarsia dejoannisi is a moth of the family Gelechiidae. It is found in France.
