= Anarsia permissa =

Scientific classification
- Kingdom: Animalia
- Phylum: Arthropoda
- Class: Insecta
- Order: Lepidoptera
- Family: Gelechiidae
- Genus: Anarsia
- Species: A. permissa

Binomial name
- Anarsia permissa Meyrick, 1926

Species of moth

Anarsia permissa is a moth of the family Gelechiidae. It was described by Edward Meyrick in 1926. It is found in Namibia.
