= Anarsia epotias =

Scientific classification
- Kingdom: Animalia
- Phylum: Arthropoda
- Class: Insecta
- Order: Lepidoptera
- Family: Gelechiidae
- Genus: Anarsia
- Species: A. epotias

Binomial name
- Anarsia epotias Meyrick, 1916

Species of moth

Anarsia epotias is a moth in the family Gelechiidae. It was described by Edward Meyrick in 1916. It is found in Bengal.

The wingspan is about 11 mm. The forewings are dark grey finely sprinkled with white, the costal half wholly suffused with white from the base to the middle. The costal edge is black at the base and there is a black subcostal dot near the base, as well as four oblique white strigulae from the costa between one-fourth and three-fourths, the first edged anteriorly by a short black strigula, the space between the first and second narrowly black, the space between the second and third forming an oblique blackish spot reaching one-third of the way across the wing, the fourth followed by some blackish suffusion on the costa. The plical and second discal stigma are indicated by short blackish dashes, each sending a line of a few scattered black scales to the termen. The hindwings are grey, the base thinly scaled.
