= Anarsia minutella =

Scientific classification
- Domain: Eukaryota
- Kingdom: Animalia
- Phylum: Arthropoda
- Class: Insecta
- Order: Lepidoptera
- Family: Gelechiidae
- Genus: Anarsia
- Species: A. minutella

Binomial name
- Anarsia minutella (Turati, 1929)

Synonyms
- Nothris minutella Turati, 1929

Species of moth

Anarsia minutella is a moth in the family Gelechiidae. It was described by Turati in 1929. It is found in Libya.
