= Anarsia melanoplecta =

Scientific classification
- Kingdom: Animalia
- Phylum: Arthropoda
- Class: Insecta
- Order: Lepidoptera
- Family: Gelechiidae
- Genus: Anarsia
- Species: A. melanoplecta

Binomial name
- Anarsia melanoplecta Meyrick, 1914

Synonyms
- Hypatima melanoplecta Meyrick, 1914

Species of moth

Anarsia melanoplecta is a moth in the family Gelechiidae. It was described by Edward Meyrick in 1914. It is found in Bengal.

The wingspan is about 10 mm. The forewings are fuscous finely irrorated (sprinkled) with whitish and with an obscure darker blotch in the disc about one-fifth and a thick black oblique streak from the middle of the costa, reaching half across the wing. There is a semi-oval black spot on the costa at four-fifths and a black pre-apical dot, preceded by whitish, the area above and below it tinged with ochreous. The hindwings are grey.

The larvae have been recorded boring into the shoots of Mangifera indica.
