= Anarsia reciproca =

Scientific classification
- Kingdom: Animalia
- Phylum: Arthropoda
- Class: Insecta
- Order: Lepidoptera
- Family: Gelechiidae
- Genus: Anarsia
- Species: A. reciproca

Binomial name
- Anarsia reciproca Meyrick, 1920

Species of moth

Anarsia reciproca is a moth in the family Gelechiidae. It was described by Edward Meyrick in 1920. It is found in southern India.

The wingspan is 10–12 mm. The forewings are grey closely and suffusedly irrorated (sprinkled) with whitish, especially towards the costa. There are some scattered blackish scales and a black line along the anterior portion of the fold, and a row of black scales posteriorly, a longitudinal line in the median portion of the disc and a shorter one between this and the termen, all these accompanied with more or less dark grey suffusion. The hindwings are grey, becoming hyaline (glass like) anteriorly except on the veins.
