= Anarsia subfulvescens =

Scientific classification
- Kingdom: Animalia
- Phylum: Arthropoda
- Class: Insecta
- Order: Lepidoptera
- Family: Gelechiidae
- Genus: Anarsia
- Species: A. subfulvescens

Binomial name
- Anarsia subfulvescens Meyrick, 1918

Species of moth

Anarsia subfulvescens is a moth of the family Gelechiidae. It was described by Edward Meyrick in 1918. It is found in South Africa.

The wingspan is about 10 mm. The forewings are pale fuscous, finely and closely irrorated with white, with a few scattered black scales and an elongate black mark on the middle of the costa, and short fine black strigulae on the costal edge near before and beyond it. There are also some small groups of black specks on the termen. The hindwings are grey, thinly scaled anteriorly.
