= Anarsia melanchropa =

Scientific classification
- Kingdom: Animalia
- Phylum: Arthropoda
- Class: Insecta
- Order: Lepidoptera
- Family: Gelechiidae
- Genus: Anarsia
- Species: A. melanchropa

Binomial name
- Anarsia melanchropa Meyrick, 1926

Species of moth

Anarsia melanchropa is a moth in the family Gelechiidae. It was described by Edward Meyrick in 1926. It is found in north-western India.

The wingspan is about 11 mm. The forewings are grey obscurely speckled whitish, posteriorly tinged brown and with some scattered black scales. There is a thick pointed median streak of blackish suffusion from the base to two-fifths, and a similar streak pointed at both ends in the disc from above the apex of this to beyond the middle. A semi-oval spot of blackish irroration (sprinkles) is found on the costa before the middle, with two small cloudy spots before this and two more distant beyond it, as well as some irregular suffusion of black irroration beneath the middle of the disc, and extending from the end of the cell towards the apex. The hindwings are grey.
