= Anarsia subnigricana =

Scientific classification
- Kingdom: Animalia
- Phylum: Arthropoda
- Class: Insecta
- Order: Lepidoptera
- Family: Gelechiidae
- Genus: Anarsia
- Species: A. subnigricana

Binomial name
- Anarsia subnigricana Park & Ponomarenko, 1996

Species of moth

Anarsia subnigricana is a moth of the family Gelechiidae. It was described by Kyu-Tek Park and Margarita Gennadievna Ponomarenko in 1996. It is found in Korea.
