= Anarsia gravata =

Scientific classification
- Kingdom: Animalia
- Phylum: Arthropoda
- Class: Insecta
- Order: Lepidoptera
- Family: Gelechiidae
- Genus: Anarsia
- Species: A. gravata

Binomial name
- Anarsia gravata Meyrick, 1911

Synonyms
- Anarsia ambitiosa Meyrick, 1913

Species of moth

Anarsia gravata is a moth of the family Gelechiidae. It was described by Edward Meyrick in 1911. It is found in South Africa.

The wingspan is 14–16 mm. The forewings are grey whitish, or grey irrorated (sprinkled) with white, more or less sprinkled with black. The markings are fuscous suffusedly irrorated with black and there is a moderately broad subbasal fascia, dilated towards the dorsum. There is also a moderately broad irregular oblique median fascia, triangularly dilated on the costa, connected with the preceding fascia on the dorsum and sometimes also on the fold. There is also an irregular apical patch, more or less connected dorsally with the median fascia. The hindwings are grey, but paler and subhyaline (almost glass like) anteriorly.
