= Anarsia halimodendri =

Scientific classification
- Domain: Eukaryota
- Kingdom: Animalia
- Phylum: Arthropoda
- Class: Insecta
- Order: Lepidoptera
- Family: Gelechiidae
- Genus: Anarsia
- Species: A. halimodendri

Binomial name
- Anarsia halimodendri Christoph, 1877

Species of moth

Anarsia halimodendri is a moth in the family Gelechiidae. It was described by Hugo Theodor Christoph in 1877. It is found in Turkmenistan and Afghanistan.

The wingspan is about 7 mm. The forewings are light grey with reddish-white sprinkling. The hindwings are shining grey.

The larvae feed on Halimodendron eichvaldii. They are greyish green.
