= Anarsia arachniota =

Scientific classification
- Kingdom: Animalia
- Phylum: Arthropoda
- Class: Insecta
- Order: Lepidoptera
- Family: Gelechiidae
- Genus: Anarsia
- Species: A. arachniota

Binomial name
- Anarsia arachniota Meyrick, 1925

Synonyms
- Ananarsia arachniota

Species of moth

Anarsia arachniota is a moth in the family Gelechiidae. It was described by Edward Meyrick in 1925. It is found in Egypt and Palestine.
