= Anarsia amalleuta =

Scientific classification
- Kingdom: Animalia
- Phylum: Arthropoda
- Class: Insecta
- Order: Lepidoptera
- Family: Gelechiidae
- Genus: Anarsia
- Species: A. amalleuta

Binomial name
- Anarsia amalleuta Meyrick, 1913

Species of moth

Anarsia amalleuta is a moth of the family Gelechiidae. It was described by Edward Meyrick in 1913. It is found in South Africa and Zimbabwe.

The wingspan is 13–15 mm. The forewings are grey irrorated (sprinkled) with white and with two short oblique blackish-grey marks on the costa about one-fourth, an elongate narrow spot about the middle, and two oblique marks beyond this. There is also a blackish streak beneath the costa from the base to the middle, one in the disc from near the base to the termen beneath the apex and one submedian from the base to the termen to above the tornus, interrupted in the middle. There is also one from the dorsum near the base to the tornus, obliquely interrupted before the middle, and two short oblique ones towards the costa posteriorly. The hindwings are rather dark grey, becoming hyaline (glass like) towards the base.
