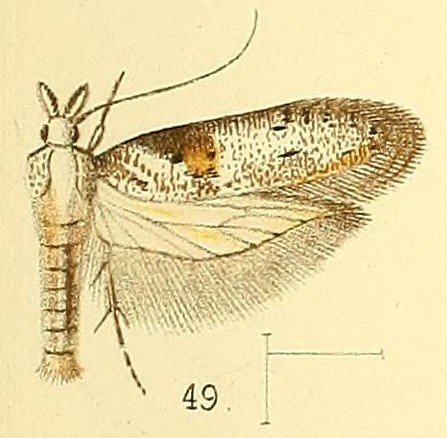

Scientific classification
- Domain: Eukaryota
- Kingdom: Animalia
- Phylum: Arthropoda
- Class: Insecta
- Order: Lepidoptera
- Family: Gelechiidae
- Genus: Anarsia
- Species: A. inculta

Binomial name
- Anarsia inculta Walsingham, 1891

= Anarsia inculta =

Species of moth

Anarsia inculta is a moth of the family Gelechiidae. It was described by Walsingham in 1891. It is found in South Africa and Gambia.
