= Anarsia psammobia =

Scientific classification
- Kingdom: Animalia
- Phylum: Arthropoda
- Class: Insecta
- Order: Lepidoptera
- Family: Gelechiidae
- Genus: Anarsia
- Species: A. psammobia

Binomial name
- Anarsia psammobia Falkovitsh & Bidzilya, 2003

Species of moth

Anarsia psammobia is a species of moth in the family Gelechiidae. It was described by Mark I. Falkovitsh and Oleksiy V. Bidzilya in 2003. It is found in Uzbekistan.
