= Anarsia epiula =

Scientific classification
- Kingdom: Animalia
- Phylum: Arthropoda
- Class: Insecta
- Order: Lepidoptera
- Family: Gelechiidae
- Genus: Anarsia
- Species: A. epiula

Binomial name
- Anarsia epiula Meyrick, 1904

Species of moth

Anarsia epiula is a moth of the family Gelechiidae. It was described by Edward Meyrick in 1904. It is found in the Australian states of New South Wales and Queensland.

The wingspan is about 14 mm (0.55 in). The forewings are fuscous, sprinkled with, and towards the costa broadly suffused with white, with a few scattered dark fuscous scales. There are some indistinct oblique dark marks on the costa and with an elongate semi-oval blackish-fuscous spot along the costa in the middle. There is an elongate blackish-fuscous spot in the middle of the disc and a dark fuscous dot in the disc at three-fourths. The hindwings are whitish fuscous, but paler and semitransparent anteriorly.
