= Anarsia centrospila =

Scientific classification
- Domain: Eukaryota
- Kingdom: Animalia
- Phylum: Arthropoda
- Class: Insecta
- Order: Lepidoptera
- Family: Gelechiidae
- Genus: Anarsia
- Species: A. centrospila

Binomial name
- Anarsia centrospila (Turner, 1919)

Synonyms
- Nothris centrospila Turner, 1919; Xerometra centrospila

Species of moth

Anarsia centrospila is a moth of the family Gelechiidae. It was described by Turner in 1919. It is found in Queensland.

The wingspan is about 15 mm. The forewings are grey-whitish, with some fuscous irroration along the costa and termen. There is a longitudinally-elongate dark-fuscous central discal spot. The hindwings are pale-grey, darker towards the apex.
