= Anarsia aspera =

Scientific classification
- Kingdom: Animalia
- Phylum: Arthropoda
- Clade: Pancrustacea
- Class: Insecta
- Order: Lepidoptera
- Family: Gelechiidae
- Genus: Anarsia
- Species: A. aspera

Binomial name
- Anarsia aspera Park, 1995

Synonyms
- Ananarsia aspera

Species of moth

Anarsia aspera is a moth of the family Gelechiidae. It was described by Kyu-Tek Park in 1995. It is found in Taiwan.
