= Anarsia eutacta =

Scientific classification
- Kingdom: Animalia
- Phylum: Arthropoda
- Class: Insecta
- Order: Lepidoptera
- Family: Gelechiidae
- Genus: Anarsia
- Species: A. eutacta

Binomial name
- Anarsia eutacta Meyrick, 1921

Species of moth

Anarsia eutacta is a moth in the family Gelechiidae. It was described by Edward Meyrick in 1921. It is found on Java in Indonesia.

The wingspan is 11–12 mm (0.43–0.47 in). The forewings are whitish grey or pale grey sprinkled with whitish, with a few scattered blackish scales and with the extreme base of the costa black. There is a small trapezoidal blackish spot on the middle of the costa, with two very slight marks preceding this and two beyond it. The discal stigmata are sometimes indicated and there is a cloudy blackish dot on the termen beneath the apex. Sometimes, there are several small indistinct dots or scattered scales near or on the termen and posterior part of the costa. The hindwings are grey.
