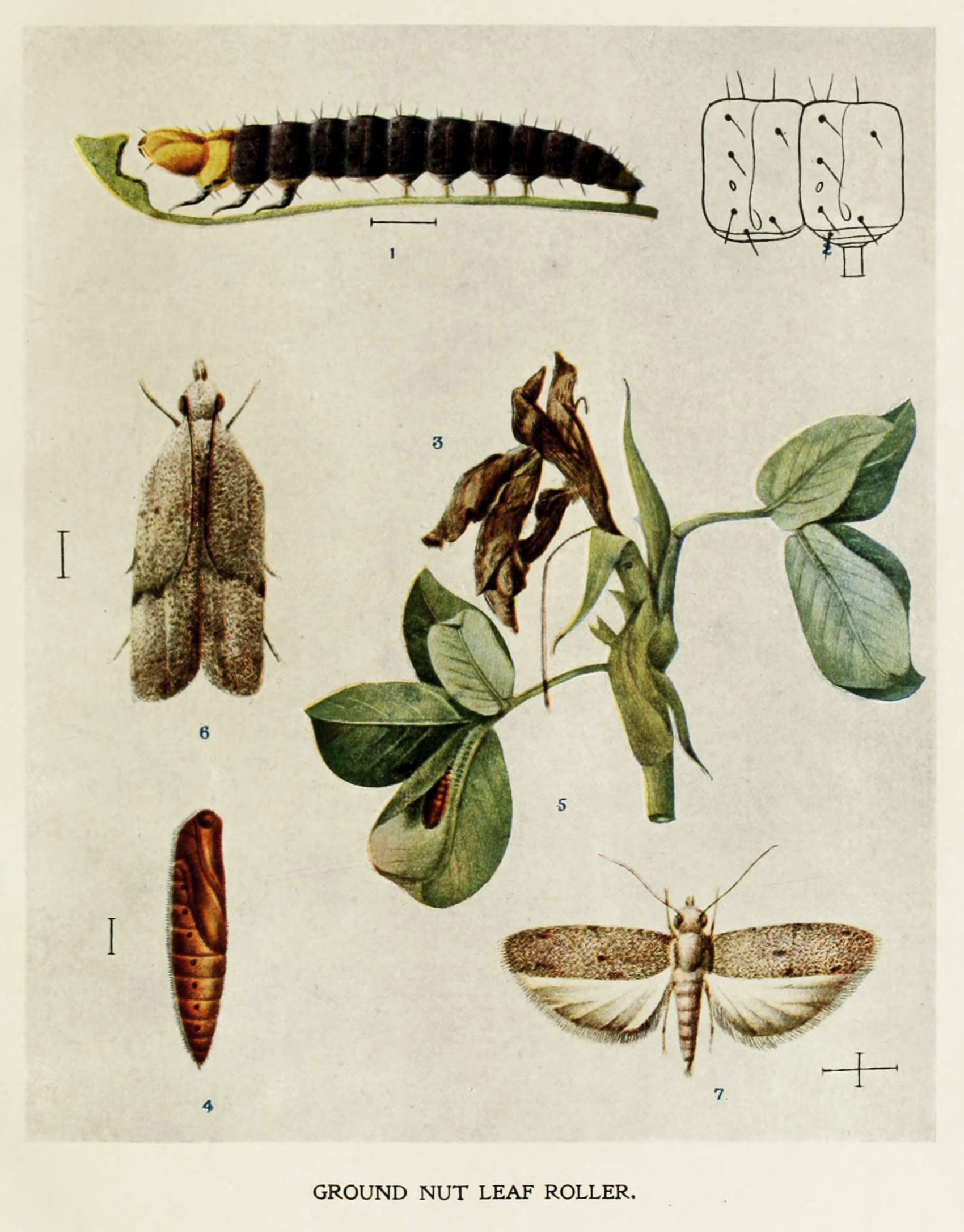

Scientific classification
- Kingdom: Animalia
- Phylum: Arthropoda
- Class: Insecta
- Order: Lepidoptera
- Family: Gelechiidae
- Genus: Anarsia
- Species: A. ephippias

Binomial name
- Anarsia ephippias Meyrick, 1908

= Anarsia ephippias =

Species of moth

Anarsia ephippias is a moth of the family Gelechiidae. It was described by Edward Meyrick in 1908. It is found in India and Sri Lanka.

This wingspan is 11–12 mm. The forewings are fuscous, irrorated (sprinkled) with grey whitish, and irregularly sprinkled with dark fuscous. There is a subtriangular dark fuscous spot on the middle of the costa, preceded and followed by two or three indistinct, dark fuscous, oblique strigulae and sometimes five or six irregular blackish marks arranged as fragments of a median longitudinal streak, but these are often little indicated. The hindwings are grey, thinly scaled and subhyaline (almost glass like) towards the base, darker posteriorly.

The larvae feed on Arachis hypogaea (peanuts), Acacia sp., Cajanus cajan, Glycine max, Mangifera indica, Mimosa rubicaulis, Vigna aconitifolia, Vigna mungo and Vigna radiata.
