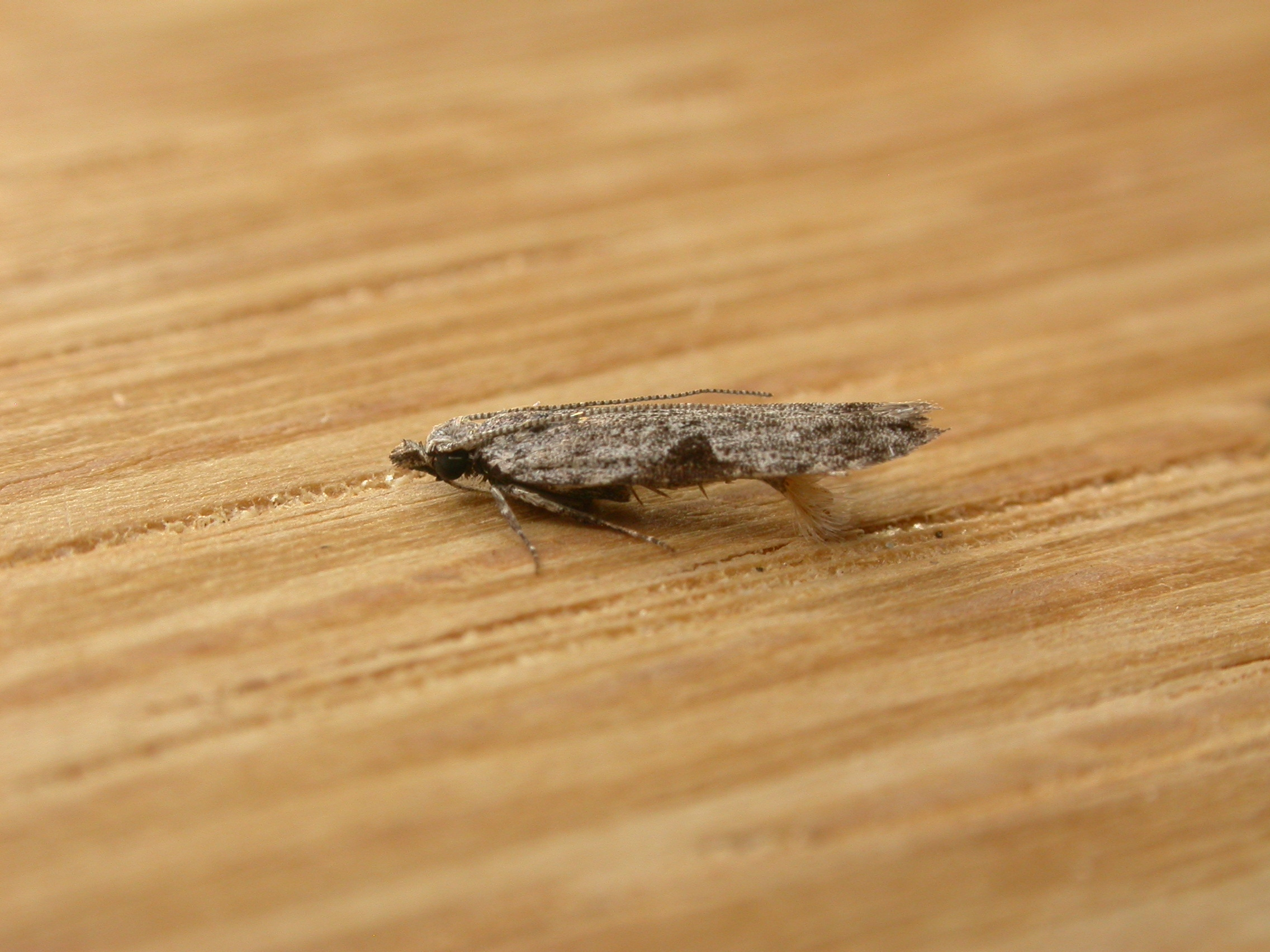

Scientific classification
- Kingdom: Animalia
- Phylum: Arthropoda
- Clade: Pancrustacea
- Class: Insecta
- Order: Lepidoptera
- Family: Gelechiidae
- Genus: Anarsia
- Species: A. molybdota

Binomial name
- Anarsia molybdota Meyrick, 1904

= Anarsia molybdota =

Species of moth

Anarsia molybdota is a species of moth of the family Gelechiidae. It is found in Australia, where it has been recorded from Queensland, Victoria, New South Wales, the Australian Capital Territory, South Australia and Western Australia.

The wingspan is 10–14 mm (0.39–0.55 in). The forewings are fuscous (dusky), irrorated (speckled) with white and with a few scattered dark fuscous scales. There are obscure indications of small darker spots along the margins, and in the disc at three-fourths, as well as a well-defined triangular dark fuscous blotch on the costa about the middle, reaching half across the wing. The hindwings are whitish-fuscous, thinly scaled and semitransparent, but fuscous towards the apex and termen.
