= Apatetrinae =

Scientific classification
- Kingdom: Animalia
- Phylum: Arthropoda
- Class: Insecta
- Order: Lepidoptera
- Family: Gelechiidae
- Subfamily: Apatetrinae; Meyrick, 1947

Genera
- See text

Synonyms
- Pexicopiinae Hodges, 1986

Subfamily of moths

Apatetrinae is a subfamily of moths in the family Gelechiidae. The subfamily was described by Edward Meyrick in 1947.

== Taxonomy and systematics ==
- Tribe Apatetrini
  - Apatetris Staudinger, 1880
  - Dactylotula Cockerell, 1888
  - Catatinagma Rebel, 1903
  - Chrysoesthia Hübner, [1825]
  - Coloptilia T. B. Fletcher, 1940
  - Epidola Staudinger, 1859
  - Epiphthora Meyrick, 1888
  - Metanarsia Staudinger, 1871
  - Oecocecis Guenée, 1870
- Tribe Pexicopiini Hodges, 1986
  - Anisoplaca Meyrick, 1886
  - Aspades Vári in Vári & Kroon, 1986
  - Coleostoma Meyrick, 1922
  - Decatopseustis Meyrick, 1925
  - Epilechia Busck, 1939
  - Ficulea Walker, 1864
  - Galtica Busck, 1914
  - Isembola Meyrick, 1926
  - Lacistodes Meyrick, 1921
  - Leistogenes Meyrick, 1927
  - Macracaena Common, 1958
  - Mometa Durrant, 1914
  - Pectinophora Busck, 1917
  - Pexicopia Common, 1958
  - Phrixocrita Meyrick, 1935
  - Platyedra Meyrick, 1895
  - Porpodryas Meyrick, 1920
  - Semnostoma Meyrick, 1918
  - Sitotroga Heinemann, 1870
  - Syncratomorpha Meyrick, 1929
  - Trachyedra Meyrick, 1929
- Unplaced to tribe
  - Acutitornus Janse, 1951
  - Anapatetris Janse, 1951
  - Autodectis Meyrick, 1937
  - Curvisignella Janse, 1951
  - Filisignella Janse, 1951
  - Grandipalpa Janse, 1951
  - Ischnophylla Janse, 1963
  - Lanceoptera Janse, 1960
  - Macrocalcara Janse, 1951
  - Neopatetris Janse, 1960
  - Radionerva Janse, 1951
