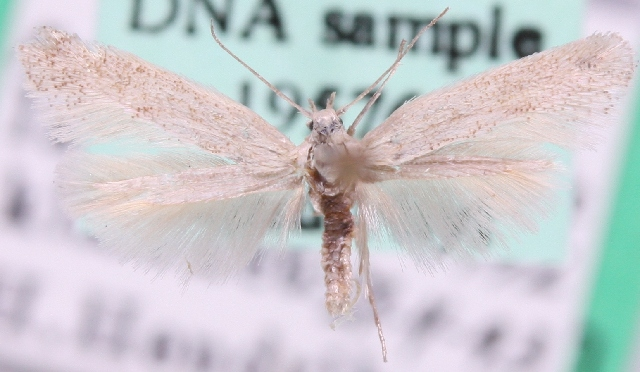
- Apatetris kinkerella

Scientific classification
- Domain: Eukaryota
- Kingdom: Animalia
- Phylum: Arthropoda
- Class: Insecta
- Order: Lepidoptera
- Family: Gelechiidae
- Subfamily: Apatetrinae
- Tribe: Apatetrini
- Genus: Apatetris; Staudinger, 1879

Synonyms
- Cecidophaga Walsingham, 1904; Proactica Walsingham, 1904

= Apatetris =

Genus of moths

Apatetris is a genus of moths in the family Gelechiidae.

== Species ==
- Apatetris agenjoi Gozmány, 1954
- Apatetris caecivaga Meyrick, 1928
- Apatetris echiochilonella (Chrétien, 1908)
- Apatetris elaeagnella Sakamaki, 2000
- Apatetris elymicola Sakamaki, 2000
- Apatetris halimilignella (Walsingham, 1904)
- Apatetris mediterranella Nel & Varenne, 2012
- Apatetris mirabella Staudinger, 1880
- Apatetris tamaricicola (Walsingham, 1911)

== Former species ==
- Apatetris altithermella (Walsingham, 1903)
- Apatetris kinkerella (Snellen, 1876)
- Apatetris nivea Philpott, 1930
