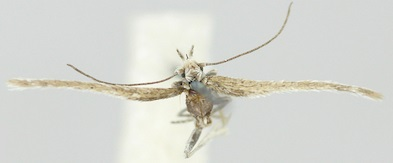

Scientific classification
- Kingdom: Animalia
- Phylum: Arthropoda
- Clade: Pancrustacea
- Class: Insecta
- Order: Lepidoptera
- Family: Gelechiidae
- Genus: Catatinagma
- Species: C. stenoptera

Binomial name
- Catatinagma stenoptera Bidzilya, 2014

= Catatinagma stenoptera =

Species of moth

Catatinagma stenoptera is a moth of the family Gelechiidae. It is found in south-eastern Turkmenistan.

The wingspan is 9.1–10.9 mm. The forewings are light brown, mottled with white along the margins. The hindwings are vestigial. Adults have been recorded on wing in February. They are active during the day. The adults have been observed and collected in the burrows of Rhombomys opimus (gerbil) and Spermophilopsis leptodactylus (ground squirrel). The moths go deeply into the burrows at night and when there is frost in the daytime.

The larvae probably feed on Carex physodes.

== Etymology ==
The species name refers to the extremely narrowed forewing, the most characteristic feature of the species.
