= Catatinagma kraterella =

Scientific classification
- Kingdom: Animalia
- Phylum: Arthropoda
- Clade: Pancrustacea
- Class: Insecta
- Order: Lepidoptera
- Family: Gelechiidae
- Genus: Catatinagma
- Species: C. kraterella

Binomial name
- Catatinagma kraterella Junnilainen & Nuppoen, 2010

Synonyms
- Catatinagma craterella

Species of moth

Catatinagma kraterella is a moth of the family Gelechiidae. It is found in Russia (the southern Ural, Buryatia and Transbaikalia). The habitat consists of grassy steppe slopes with open, gravelly patches, as well as sandy steppe.

The wingspan is 11–14 mm.
