= Apatetris elymicola =

Scientific classification
- Kingdom: Animalia
- Phylum: Arthropoda
- Clade: Pancrustacea
- Class: Insecta
- Order: Lepidoptera
- Family: Gelechiidae
- Genus: Apatetris
- Species: A. elymicola

Binomial name
- Apatetris elymicola Sakamaki, 2000

Species of moth

Apatetris elymicola is a moth of the family Gelechiidae. It was described by Sakamaki in 2000. It is found in Japan (Hokkaidô).

The wingspan is 10.1–11.4 mm.

The larvae feed on Elymus mollis. They mine the leaves of their host plant. Three to five larvae may mine a single leaf blade.
