= Epiphthora spectrella =

Scientific classification
- Domain: Eukaryota
- Kingdom: Animalia
- Phylum: Arthropoda
- Class: Insecta
- Order: Lepidoptera
- Family: Gelechiidae
- Genus: Epiphthora
- Species: E. spectrella

Binomial name
- Epiphthora spectrella Meyrick, 1904

Species of moth

Epiphthora spectrella is a moth of the family Gelechiidae. It was described by Edward Meyrick in 1904. It is found in Australia, where it has been recorded from Victoria, Tasmania and South Australia.

The wingspan is 10–11 mm (0.39–0.43 in). The forewings are whitish, sometimes much suffused with whitish ochreous, irrorated (sprinkled) with ochreous or fuscous. There is an outwardly oblique bar from the middle of the dorsum reaching halfway across the wing, and a spot on the tornus which is dark fuscous, often partially or almost wholly obsolete. The hindwings are grey.
