= Epiphthora delochorda =

Scientific classification
- Domain: Eukaryota
- Kingdom: Animalia
- Phylum: Arthropoda
- Class: Insecta
- Order: Lepidoptera
- Family: Gelechiidae
- Genus: Epiphthora
- Species: E. delochorda

Binomial name
- Epiphthora delochorda Lower, 1918

Species of moth

Epiphthora delochorda is a moth of the family Gelechiidae. It was described by Oswald Bertram Lower in 1918. It is found in Australia, where it has been recorded from South Australia.

The wingspan is about 18 mm. The forewings are ashy-grey whitish with a narrow white streak along the costa, from one-quarter to three-quarters and a narrow white streak along the fold, obscured posteriorly. There is a fuscous outwardly oblique rather broad bar, from the dorsum at one-third to the termination of a white streak along the fold. The hindwings are grey, tinged with pale fuscous.
