= Epiphthora chionocephala =

Scientific classification
- Domain: Eukaryota
- Kingdom: Animalia
- Phylum: Arthropoda
- Class: Insecta
- Order: Lepidoptera
- Family: Gelechiidae
- Genus: Epiphthora
- Species: E. chionocephala

Binomial name
- Epiphthora chionocephala (Lower, 1901)

Synonyms
- Stenopherna chionocephala Lower, 1901

Species of moth

Epiphthora chionocephala is a moth of the family Gelechiidae. It was described by Oswald Bertram Lower in 1901. It is found in Australia, where it has been recorded from New South Wales.

The wingspan is about 11 mm (0.43 in). The forewings are white, irrorated (sprinkled) with dark fuscous and with an undefined fascia at one-fourth, cloudy dorsal spots before and beyond the middle, and a nearly clear white narrow subapical fascia dilated on the costa. There are undefined spots of dark fuscous suffusion on the submedian fold before the anterior fascia and between the dorsal spots, and before and beyond the subapical fascia. The hindwings are grey.
