= Metanarsia partilella =

Scientific classification
- Domain: Eukaryota
- Kingdom: Animalia
- Phylum: Arthropoda
- Class: Insecta
- Order: Lepidoptera
- Family: Gelechiidae
- Genus: Metanarsia
- Species: M. partilella

Binomial name
- Metanarsia partilella (Christoph, 1887)

Synonyms
- Teleia partilella Christoph, 1887

Species of moth

Metanarsia partilella is a moth of the family Gelechiidae. It is found in Turkmenistan and Uzbekistan.

The length of the forewings is 10–11 mm. Adults are on wing in May.
