= Epiphthora lemurella =

Scientific classification
- Domain: Eukaryota
- Kingdom: Animalia
- Phylum: Arthropoda
- Class: Insecta
- Order: Lepidoptera
- Family: Gelechiidae
- Genus: Epiphthora
- Species: E. lemurella

Binomial name
- Epiphthora lemurella Meyrick, 1904

Species of moth

Epiphthora lemurella is a moth of the family Gelechiidae. It was described by Edward Meyrick in 1904. It is found in Australia, where it has been recorded from New South Wales.

The wingspan is about 14 mm (0.55 in). The forewings are ochreous fuscous, whitish sprinkled with a moderate snow-white streak along the costa from the base to five-sixths, narrowed posteriorly. There is also a moderate suffused white streak along the fold from the base to the tornus and the apex is mixed with dark fuscous. The hindwings are light grey.
