= Apatetris elaeagnella =

Scientific classification
- Kingdom: Animalia
- Phylum: Arthropoda
- Class: Insecta
- Order: Lepidoptera
- Family: Gelechiidae
- Genus: Apatetris
- Species: A. elaeagnella

Binomial name
- Apatetris elaeagnella Sakamaki, 2000

Species of moth

Apatetris elaeagnella is a moth of the family Gelechiidae. It was described by Sakamaki in 2000. It is found in Japan (Honshu and Kyushu).

The wingspan is 5.4–9.2 mm. There are two generations per year.

The larvae feed on Elaeagnus macrophylla, Elaeagnus multiflora var. hortensis, Elaeagnus umbellata and Elaeagnus pungens. They mine the leaves of their host plant. Larvae of the autumn generation overwinter within the mine.
