= Epiphthora leptoconia =

Scientific classification
- Domain: Eukaryota
- Kingdom: Animalia
- Phylum: Arthropoda
- Class: Insecta
- Order: Lepidoptera
- Family: Gelechiidae
- Genus: Epiphthora
- Species: E. leptoconia

Binomial name
- Epiphthora leptoconia Turner, 1919

Species of moth

Epiphthora leptoconia is a moth of the family Gelechiidae. It was described by Alfred Jefferis Turner in 1919. It is found in Australia, where it has been recorded from New South Wales.

The wingspan is about 13 mm. The forewings are whitish sparsely irrorated with fuscous and sometimes with dots beneath the fold at one-sixth, one-third and the tornus, but these are not always defined. The hindwings are whitish-grey.
