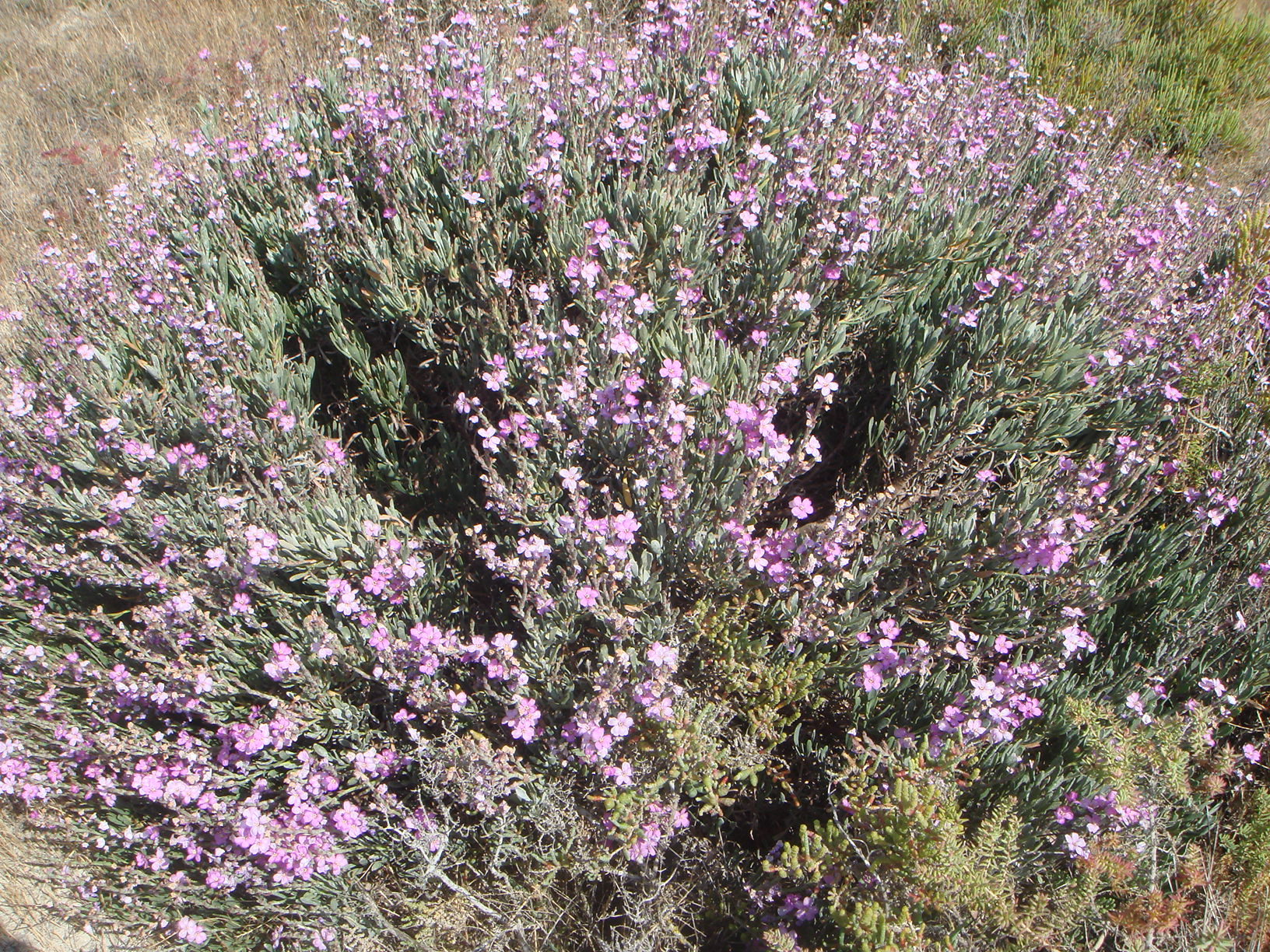
- Limoniastrum monopetalum

Scientific classification
- Kingdom: Plantae
- Clade: Tracheophytes
- Clade: Angiosperms
- Clade: Eudicots
- Order: Caryophyllales
- Family: Plumbaginaceae
- Genus: Limoniastrum; Heist. ex Fabr. (1759)

Synonyms
- Bubania Girard, nom. illeg. superfl.; Limoniodes Kuntze, nom. illeg. superfl.

= Limoniastrum =

Genus of shrubs

Limoniastrum is a genus of plants in the family Plumbaginaceae, containing two known species of subshrubs found the Mediterranean region, within Africa and southern Europe.

It was published by Fabricius in 1759 in 'Enum. Meth. Pl. Hort. Helmstad' Vol.25.

== Species ==
Two species are accepted:

- Limoniastrum guyonianum Boiss.
- Limoniastrum monopetalum (L.) Boiss. – grand statice
