= Apatetris echiochilonella =

Scientific classification
- Domain: Eukaryota
- Kingdom: Animalia
- Phylum: Arthropoda
- Class: Insecta
- Order: Lepidoptera
- Family: Gelechiidae
- Genus: Apatetris
- Species: A. echiochilonella

Binomial name
- Apatetris echiochilonella (Chrétien, 1908)

Synonyms
- Proactica echiochilonella Chrétien, 1908

Species of moth

Apatetris echiochilonella is a moth of the family Gelechiidae. It was described by Pierre Chrétien in 1908. It is found in Algeria.

The wingspan is about 12 mm.

The larvae feed on Echiochilon fruticosum.
