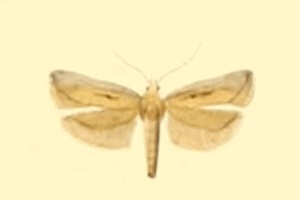

Scientific classification
- Domain: Eukaryota
- Kingdom: Animalia
- Phylum: Arthropoda
- Class: Insecta
- Order: Lepidoptera
- Family: Gelechiidae
- Genus: Metanarsia
- Species: M. onzella

Binomial name
- Metanarsia onzella Christoph, 1887

= Metanarsia onzella =

Species of moth

Metanarsia onzella is a moth of the family Gelechiidae. It is found in south-eastern Kazakhstan, Uzbekistan, Turkmenistan and Russia (the southern European part).

The length of the forewings is 7.5–8 mm. Adults are on wing in June and August.
