= Epiphthora niphaula =

Scientific classification
- Domain: Eukaryota
- Kingdom: Animalia
- Phylum: Arthropoda
- Class: Insecta
- Order: Lepidoptera
- Family: Gelechiidae
- Genus: Epiphthora
- Species: E. niphaula

Binomial name
- Epiphthora niphaula Meyrick, 1904

Species of moth

Epiphthora niphaula is a moth of the family Gelechiidae. It was described by Edward Meyrick in 1904. It is found in Australia, where it has been recorded from Tasmania.

The wingspan is about 9 mm (0.35 in). The forewings are brownish ochreous mixed with white and with a moderately broad silvery-white costal streak from the base to the apex. There is a cloudy undefined white streak along the submedian fold from the base to the tornus. The hindwings are grey whitish.
