= Apatetris tamaricicola =

Scientific classification
- Domain: Eukaryota
- Kingdom: Animalia
- Phylum: Arthropoda
- Class: Insecta
- Order: Lepidoptera
- Family: Gelechiidae
- Genus: Apatetris
- Species: A. tamaricicola

Binomial name
- Apatetris tamaricicola (Walsingham, 1911)

Synonyms
- Cecidophaga tamaricicola Walsingham, 1911

Species of moth

Apatetris tamaricicola is a moth of the family Gelechiidae. It was described by Lord Walsingham in 1911. It is found in Algeria.

The wingspan is 17–23 mm. The forewings are pale fawn-ochreous, unmarked, except for a very slight sprinkling of minute brown scales toward the apex, and sometimes a few groups of the same around the end of the cell. The hindwings are shining, pale brassy ochreous.

The larvae feed on Tamarix species. They make galls on the branches of their host plant. The larvae have a white body and an olivaceous head.
