= Metanarsia piskunovi =

Scientific classification
- Domain: Eukaryota
- Kingdom: Animalia
- Phylum: Arthropoda
- Class: Insecta
- Order: Lepidoptera
- Family: Gelechiidae
- Genus: Metanarsia
- Species: M. piskunovi

Binomial name
- Metanarsia piskunovi Bidzilya, 2005

Species of moth

Metanarsia piskunovi is a moth of the family Gelechiidae. It is found in Mongolia and Qinghai, China.

The length of the forewings is 10–11 mm. Adults are on wing from July to early August.
