= Apatetris caecivaga =

Scientific classification
- Kingdom: Animalia
- Phylum: Arthropoda
- Class: Insecta
- Order: Lepidoptera
- Family: Gelechiidae
- Genus: Apatetris
- Species: A. caecivaga

Binomial name
- Apatetris caecivaga Meyrick, 1928

Species of moth

Apatetris caecivaga is a moth of the family Gelechiidae. It was described by Edward Meyrick in 1928. It is found in India (Punjab).

The wingspan is about 12 mm. The forewings are grey-whitish closely speckled fuscous. The plical and second discal stigmata are obscurely indicated by darker irroration. The hindwings are grey.

The larvae feed on Tamarix articulata.
