= Epiphthora thyellias =

Scientific classification
- Domain: Eukaryota
- Kingdom: Animalia
- Phylum: Arthropoda
- Class: Insecta
- Order: Lepidoptera
- Family: Gelechiidae
- Genus: Epiphthora
- Species: E. thyellias

Binomial name
- Epiphthora thyellias Meyrick, 1904

Species of moth

Epiphthora thyellias is a moth of the family Gelechiidae. It was described by Edward Meyrick in 1904. It is found in Australia, where it has been recorded from Victoria.

The wingspan is about 13 mm (0.51 in). The forewings are white, suffused with whitish ochreous except towards the apex, irregularly sprinkled with dark fuscous. There is a broad longitudinal streak of dark fuscous irroration (sprinkles) from before the middle of the disc to the apex. The hindwings are ochreous whitish.
