= Apatetris agenjoi =

Scientific classification
- Kingdom: Animalia
- Phylum: Arthropoda
- Clade: Pancrustacea
- Class: Insecta
- Order: Lepidoptera
- Family: Gelechiidae
- Genus: Apatetris
- Species: A. agenjoi

Binomial name
- Apatetris agenjoi Gozmány, 1954

Species of moth

Apatetris agenjoi is a moth of the family Gelechiidae. It is found in Spain and Portugal.
