= Epiphthora megalornis =

Scientific classification
- Domain: Eukaryota
- Kingdom: Animalia
- Phylum: Arthropoda
- Class: Insecta
- Order: Lepidoptera
- Family: Gelechiidae
- Genus: Epiphthora
- Species: E. megalornis

Binomial name
- Epiphthora megalornis Meyrick, 1904

Species of moth

Epiphthora megalornis is a moth of the family Gelechiidae. It was described by Edward Meyrick in 1904. It is found in Australia, where it has been recorded from Western Australia.

The wingspan is 16–20 mm (0.63–0.79 in). The forewings are whitish, finely irrorated (sprinkled) with rather dark fuscous and with the costal edge slenderly white from one-fourth to three-fourths. The hindwings are rather dark grey.
