= Ischnophylla =

Scientific classification
- Domain: Eukaryota
- Kingdom: Animalia
- Phylum: Arthropoda
- Class: Insecta
- Order: Lepidoptera
- Family: Gelechiidae
- Subfamily: Apatetrinae
- Genus: Ischnophylla; Janse, 1963
- Species: I. similicolor

Binomial name
- Ischnophylla similicolor Janse, 1963

Genus of moths

Ischnophylla is a genus of moths in the family Gelechiidae. It contains the species Ischnophylla similicolor, which is found in South Africa.
