= Epiphthora poliopasta =

Scientific classification
- Domain: Eukaryota
- Kingdom: Animalia
- Phylum: Arthropoda
- Class: Insecta
- Order: Lepidoptera
- Family: Gelechiidae
- Genus: Epiphthora
- Species: E. poliopasta

Binomial name
- Epiphthora poliopasta Turner, 1919

Species of moth

Epiphthora poliopasta is a moth of the family Gelechiidae. It was described by Alfred Jefferis Turner in 1919. It is found in Australia, where it has been recorded from Queensland.

The wingspan is about 13 mm. The forewings are whitish uniformly irrorated with ochreous-grey and with a few blackish scales but no defined dots. The hindwings are whitish-grey.
