= Apatetris mediterranella =

Scientific classification
- Domain: Eukaryota
- Kingdom: Animalia
- Phylum: Arthropoda
- Class: Insecta
- Order: Lepidoptera
- Family: Gelechiidae
- Genus: Apatetris
- Species: A. mediterranella

Binomial name
- Apatetris mediterranella Nel & Varenne, 2012

Species of moth

Apatetris mediterranella is a moth of the family Gelechiidae. It was described by Jacques Nel and Thierry Varenne in 2012. It is found in southern France and Italy.

The wingspan is 8–10 mm.
