= Metanarsia monochroma =

Scientific classification
- Domain: Eukaryota
- Kingdom: Animalia
- Phylum: Arthropoda
- Class: Insecta
- Order: Lepidoptera
- Family: Gelechiidae
- Genus: Metanarsia
- Species: M. monochroma

Binomial name
- Metanarsia monochroma Bidzilya, 2008

Species of moth

Metanarsia monochroma is a moth of the family Gelechiidae. It is found in Afghanistan and Pakistan.

The wingspan is 15–18.5 mm. Adults are on wing in May.
