= Epiphthora acropasta =

Scientific classification
- Domain: Eukaryota
- Kingdom: Animalia
- Phylum: Arthropoda
- Class: Insecta
- Order: Lepidoptera
- Family: Gelechiidae
- Genus: Epiphthora
- Species: E. acropasta

Binomial name
- Epiphthora acropasta Turner, 1919

Species of moth

Epiphthora acropasta is a moth of the family Gelechiidae. It was described by Alfred Jefferis Turner in 1919. It is found in Australia, where it has been recorded from Queensland.

The wingspan is about 8 mm. The forewings are white with scanty pale ochreous-fuscous irroration, more pronounced near the apex. The discal dots are not defined and there is an ochreous-fuscous dot at the tornus, another beneath the costa at four-fifths, and several between this and the apex. The hindwings are whitish.
