= Epiphthora hyperaenicta =

Scientific classification
- Kingdom: Animalia
- Phylum: Arthropoda
- Class: Insecta
- Order: Lepidoptera
- Family: Gelechiidae
- Genus: Epiphthora
- Species: E. hyperaenicta

Binomial name
- Epiphthora hyperaenicta Turner, 1927

Species of moth

Epiphthora hyperaenicta is a moth of the family Gelechiidae. It was described by Alfred Jefferis Turner in 1927. It is found in Australia, where it has been recorded from Tasmania.

The wingspan is about 12 mm. The forewings are pale-grey with fine fuscous irroration. The hindwings are grey.
