= Autodectis =

Scientific classification
- Kingdom: Animalia
- Phylum: Arthropoda
- Class: Insecta
- Order: Lepidoptera
- Family: Gelechiidae
- Subfamily: Apatetrinae
- Genus: Autodectis; Meyrick, 1937
- Species: A. atelarga

Binomial name
- Autodectis atelarga Meyrick, 1937

Genus of moths

Autodectis is a genus of moth in the family Gelechiidae. It contains the species Autodectis atelarga, which is found in South Africa.

The wingspan is about 24 mm.
