= Curvisignella =

Scientific classification
- Kingdom: Animalia
- Phylum: Arthropoda
- Class: Insecta
- Order: Lepidoptera
- Family: Gelechiidae
- Subfamily: Apatetrinae
- Genus: Curvisignella; Janse, 1951
- Species: C. leucogaea

Binomial name
- Curvisignella leucogaea (Meyrick, 1921)

Synonyms
- Apatetris leucogaea Meyrick, 1921

Genus of moths

Curvisignella is a genus of moths in the family Gelechiidae. It contains the species Curvisignella leucogaea, which is found in Zimbabwe.

The wingspan is about 13 mm. The forewings are light grey overlaid with white. The hindwings are light grey.
