= Radionerva =

Scientific classification
- Kingdom: Animalia
- Phylum: Arthropoda
- Class: Insecta
- Order: Lepidoptera
- Family: Gelechiidae
- Subfamily: Apatetrinae
- Genus: Radionerva; Janse, 1951
- Species: R. collecta

Binomial name
- Radionerva collecta (Meyrick, 1921)

Synonyms
- Apatetris collecta Meyrick, 1921

Genus of moths

Radionerva is a genus of moths in the family Gelechiidae erected by Anthonie Johannes Theodorus Janse in 1951. It contains the species Radionerva collecta, first described by Edward Meyrick in 1921. It is found in Zimbabwe.

The wingspan is 8–9 mm. The forewings are whitish grey closely speckled with dark fuscous. The hindwings are grey.
