= Epiphthora psychrodes =

Scientific classification
- Domain: Eukaryota
- Kingdom: Animalia
- Phylum: Arthropoda
- Class: Insecta
- Order: Lepidoptera
- Family: Gelechiidae
- Genus: Epiphthora
- Species: E. psychrodes

Binomial name
- Epiphthora psychrodes Meyrick, 1904

Species of moth

Epiphthora psychrodes is a moth of the family Gelechiidae. It was described by Edward Meyrick in 1904. It is found in Australia, where it has been recorded from New South Wales.

The wingspan is about 10.5 mm (0.41 in). The forewings are ochreous whitish and the hindwings whitish.
