= Epiphthora miarodes =

Scientific classification
- Kingdom: Animalia
- Phylum: Arthropoda
- Class: Insecta
- Order: Lepidoptera
- Family: Gelechiidae
- Genus: Epiphthora
- Species: E. miarodes

Binomial name
- Epiphthora miarodes Meyrick, 1904

Synonyms
- Epiphthora psolosticta Turner, 1919

Species of moth

Epiphthora miarodes is a moth of the family Gelechiidae. It was described by Edward Meyrick in 1904. It is found in Australia, where it has been recorded from Tasmania and New South Wales.

The wingspan is about 14 mm (0.55 in). The forewings are whitish, thinly sprinkled with fuscous and with minute black dots beneath the costa at one-sixth and one-third, and beneath the fold at one-fifth and two-fifths. There is a row of scattered black scales in the disc above the middle from beyond the middle to three-fourths and the apex is suffused with rather dark fuscous. The hindwings are grey.
