= Platyedra piceicoma =

Scientific classification
- Kingdom: Animalia
- Phylum: Arthropoda
- Class: Insecta
- Order: Lepidoptera
- Family: Gelechiidae
- Genus: Platyedra
- Species: P. piceicoma

Binomial name
- Platyedra piceicoma Meyrick, 1931

Species of moth

Platyedra piceicoma is a moth of the family Gelechiidae. It was described by Edward Meyrick in 1931. It is found in Cameroon.
