= Epiphthora anisaula =

Scientific classification
- Domain: Eukaryota
- Kingdom: Animalia
- Phylum: Arthropoda
- Class: Insecta
- Order: Lepidoptera
- Family: Gelechiidae
- Genus: Epiphthora
- Species: E. anisaula

Binomial name
- Epiphthora anisaula (Meyrick, 1921)

Synonyms
- Apatetris anisaula Meyrick, 1921

Species of moth

Epiphthora anisaula is a moth of the family Gelechiidae. It was described by Edward Meyrick in 1921. It is found in Australia, where it has been recorded from the Northern Territory.

The wingspan is 10–11 mm. The forewings are whitish ochreous, more or less indicated with lines of blackish-grey irroration (sprinkles) between the veins. The stigmata are dark fuscous, the plical rather obliquely beyond the first discal, the second discal rather below the middle. The hindwings are pale grey.
