= Metanarsia mongola =

Scientific classification
- Domain: Eukaryota
- Kingdom: Animalia
- Phylum: Arthropoda
- Class: Insecta
- Order: Lepidoptera
- Family: Gelechiidae
- Genus: Metanarsia
- Species: M. mongola

Binomial name
- Metanarsia mongola Bidzilya, 2008

Species of moth

Metanarsia mongola is a moth of the family Gelechiidae. It is found in Mongolia.

The wingspan is 21–23 mm. The forewings are light brown. The hindwings are light grey. Adults are on wing from July to early August.
