= Grandipalpa =

Scientific classification
- Domain: Eukaryota
- Kingdom: Animalia
- Phylum: Arthropoda
- Class: Insecta
- Order: Lepidoptera
- Family: Gelechiidae
- Subfamily: Apatetrinae
- Genus: Grandipalpa; Janse, 1951
- Species: G. robusta

Binomial name
- Grandipalpa robusta Janse, 1951

Genus of moths

Grandipalpa is a genus of moths in the family Gelechiidae. It contains the species Grandipalpa robusta, which is found in Namibia.
