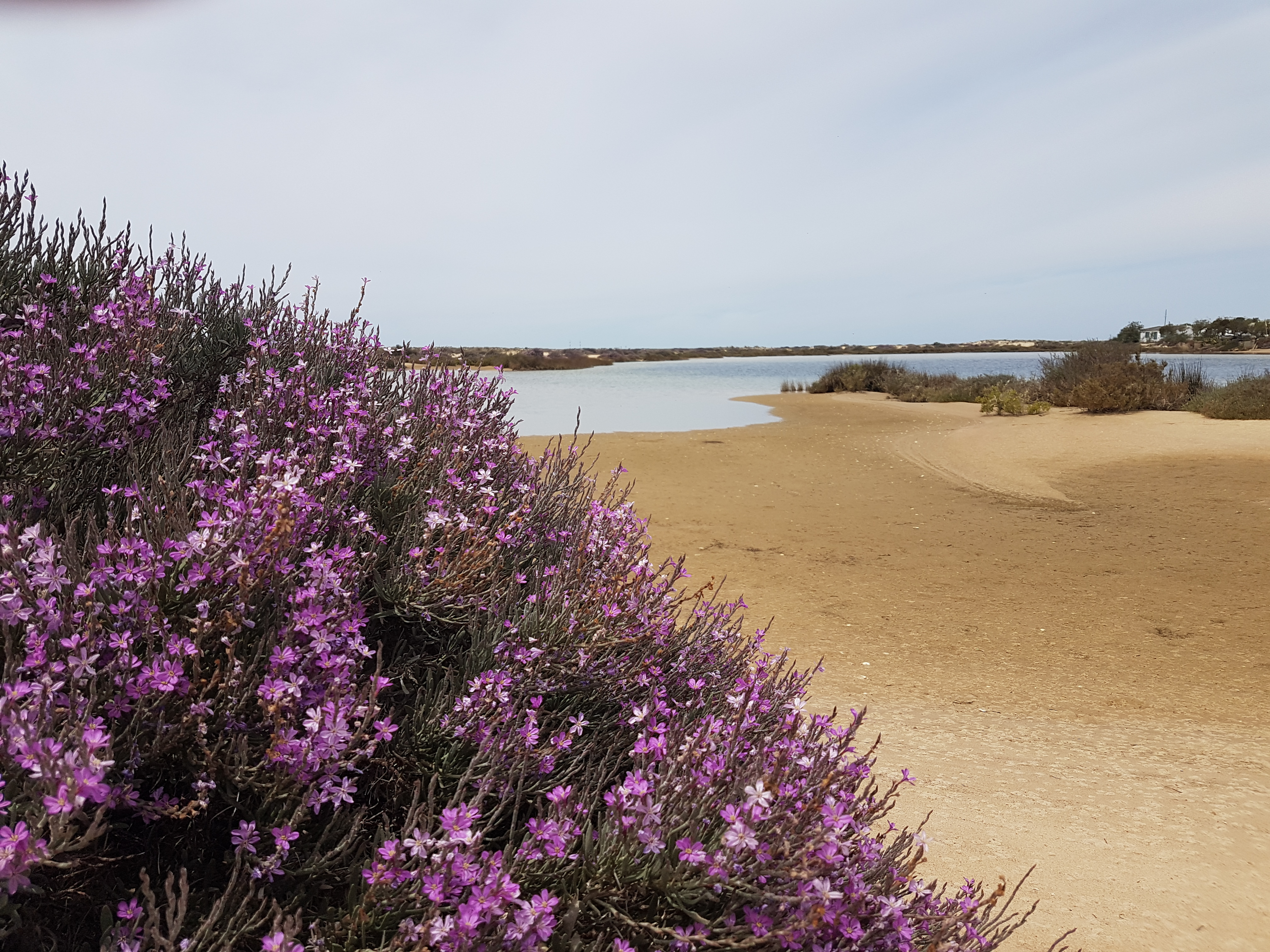
- Limoniastrum monopetalum in Ria Formosa, the Algarve, Portugal

Scientific classification
- Kingdom: Plantae
- Clade: Tracheophytes
- Clade: Angiosperms
- Clade: Eudicots
- Order: Caryophyllales
- Family: Plumbaginaceae
- Genus: Limoniastrum
- Species: L. monopetalum

Binomial name
- Limoniastrum monopetalum (L.) Boiss.

Synonyms
- Bubania monopetala (L.) Girard; Limoniastrum articulatum Moench; Limoniastrum multiflorum Bonhomme & P.Fourn.; Limonium monopetalum (L.) Hill; Limonium siculum Mill.; Statice denudata Regel & Körn.; Statice monopetala L.; Statice scabra Pers.; Taxanthema monopetalum (L.) Sweet

= Limoniastrum monopetalum =

Species of flowering plant

Limoniastrum monopetalum ('grand statice'), is a species of flowering plant in the family Plumbaginaceae that is native to Europe, Northern Africa and Western Asia. It has been found in salt marshes, dunes and other coastal areas with high salinity levels. It has silver-grey or light green leaves on multi branching stems. At the ends of the stems are the summer blooming flowers, in shades of pink, purple, lavender and violet. It is known to be salt and drought tolerant (as a halophyte), as well as having the ability to withstand some forms of soil pollution.

== Description ==
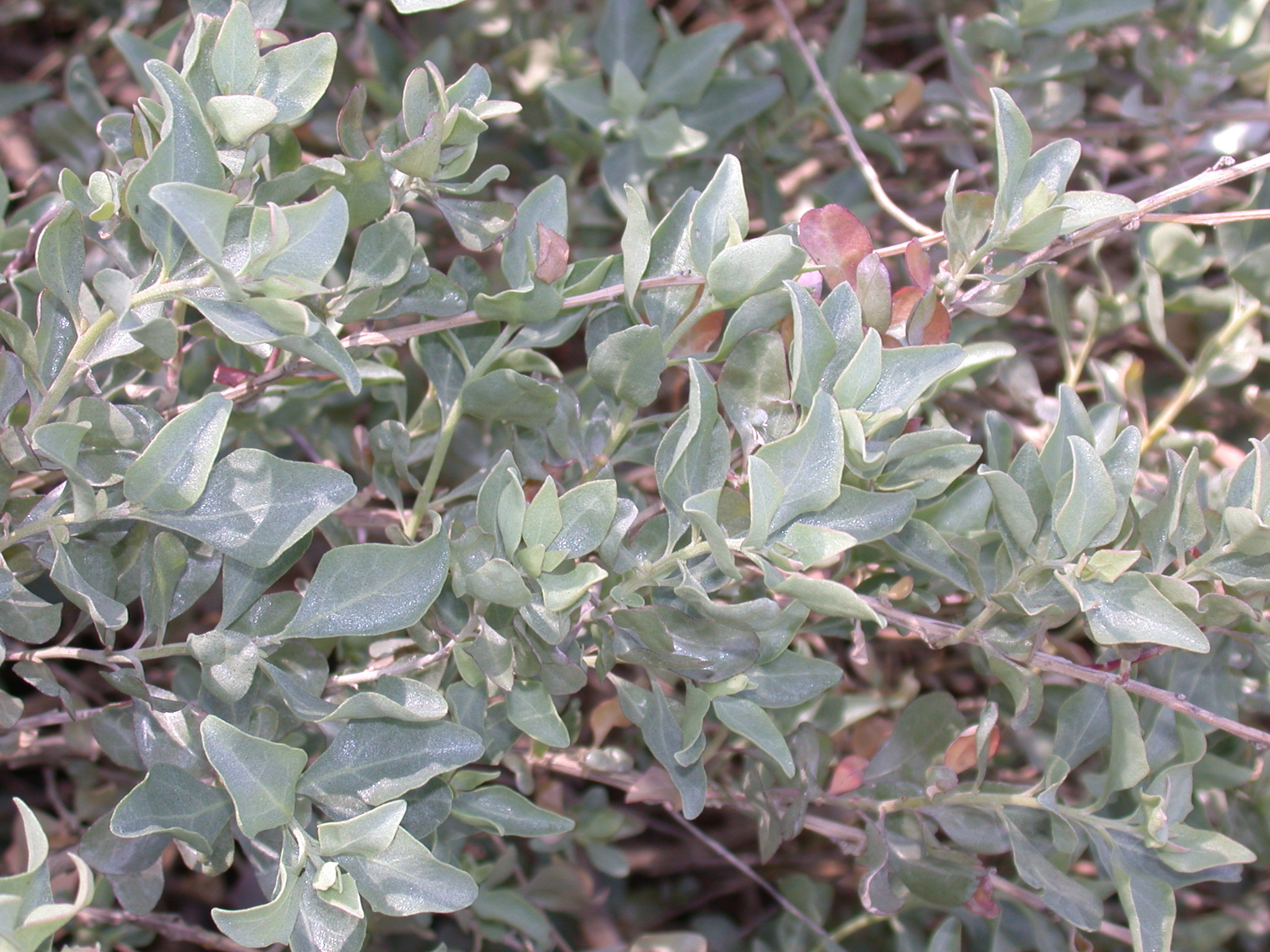
Branch and leaves of Limoniastrum monopetalum

Limoniastrum monopetalum is a small evergreen shrub, that has long thread-like and tufted fine roots, with ephemeral roots that are produced in a wet season and then vanish afterwards. The wide spread of the roots helps the plant withstand the high salinity conditions and they can also travel down to at least 50 cm (20 in) to reach the water table.

It can grow up to 90–120 cm (35–47 in) tall, with much branched, and leafy stems. They are terete (round in cross-section) and grey in colour. The leaves are normally at the top of the branches, leaving the base of the branch, bare with leaf scars.

It has light green, green-grey, or silvery blue-green, leather-like, stiff, narrowly spathulate (spoon-shaped) leaves. They are covered with white granulations; calcareous (carbonate deposits) tubercles. This gives the plant a whitish grey aspect.

It blooms between mid-Spring and early Summer. Variously; between March and November, between July and August, or June to August. The numerous flowers, come in shades of pink, lavender pink, purple-pink, or lavender flowers. As they die they fade to violet.

They have articulated rachis (spine) and tubular or funnel-shaped corolla (the petals of a flower), they appear at the ends of the branches. They have leathery bracts, the external sepals are 2.5–7 mm and the internal sepals are 7.5–9 mm long, scarious (dry and membranous), covered almost entirely by the internal bract. It also has 5 stamens.

After flowering it produces a fruit (or seed capsule), which is membranous, indehiscent and included in the calyx.

== Biochemistry ==
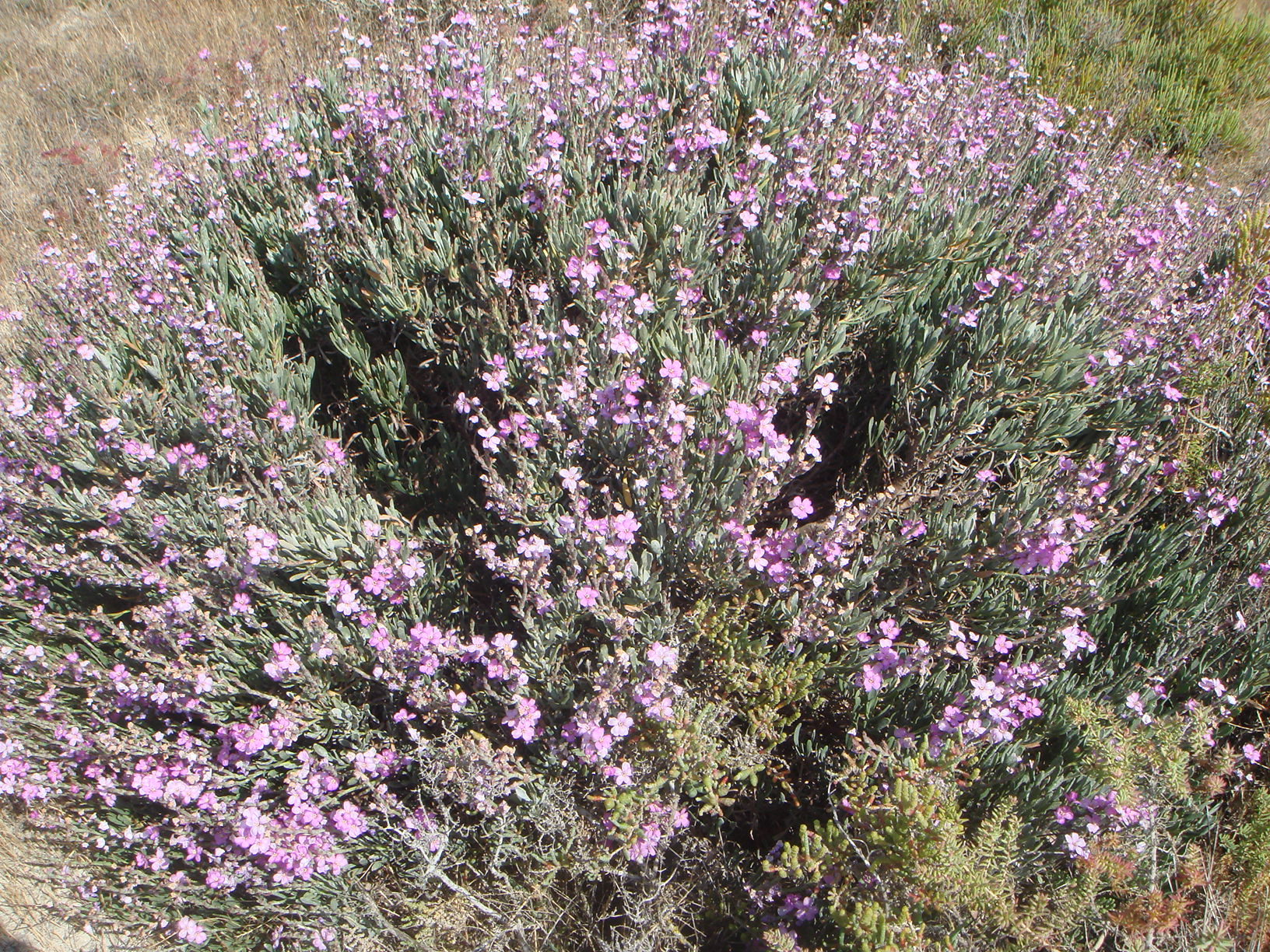
Limoniastrum monopetalum, Parque Natural Bahía de Cádiz, San Fernando, Cádiz, Spain

It is a halophyte plant, and the leaves of Limoniastrum monopetalum have been studied to determine how the plants phenolic contents and biological activities coped with various solvent effects.

In 2014, the salt excretion crystals on the leaf surface of the plant were studied as a possible metal detoxification mechanism.

== Taxonomy ==
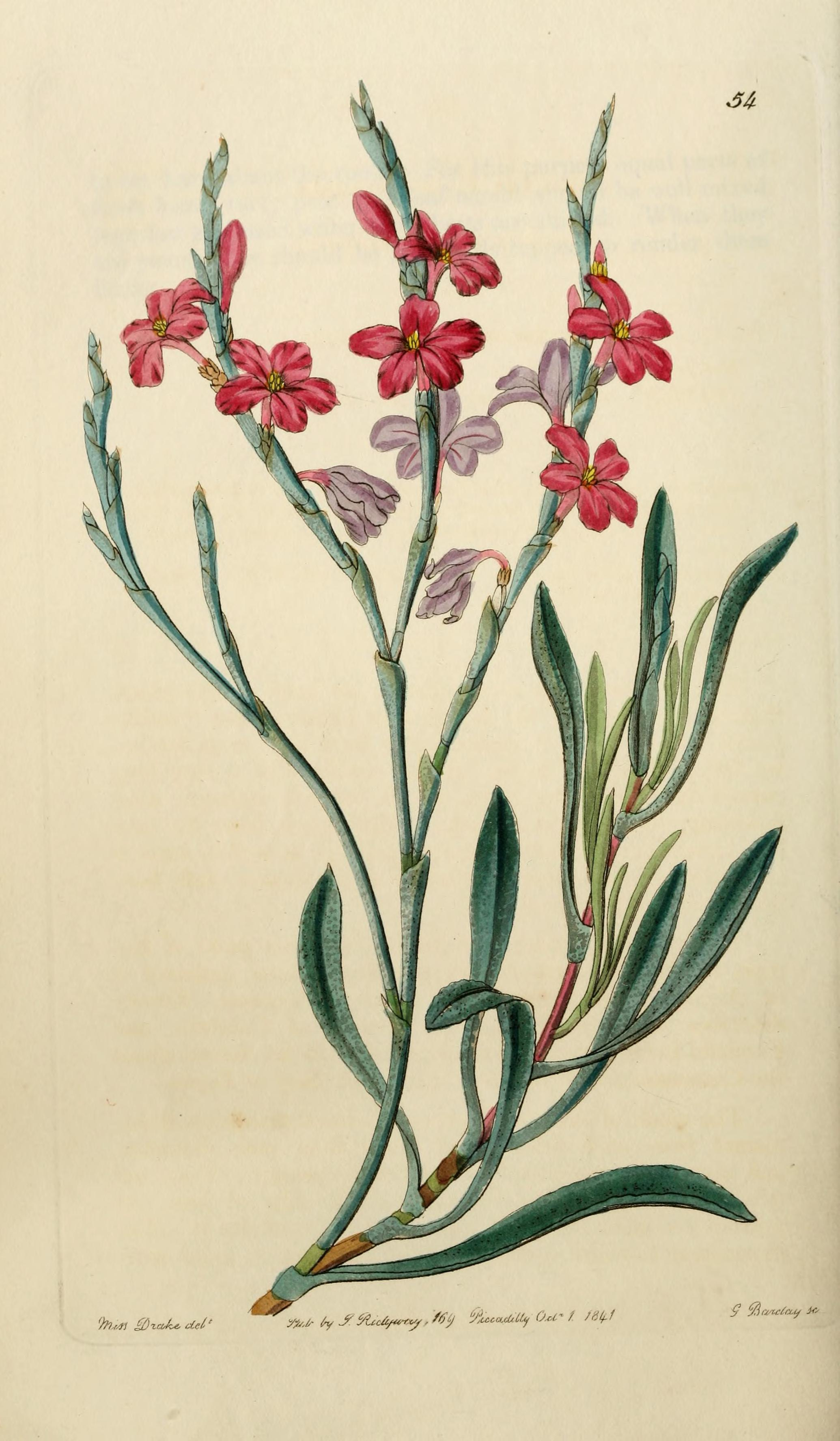
Illustration of Limoniastrum monopetalum by Sydenham Edwards in The Botanical Register

It is known in Mali as zeïta and zita in Arabic. It is known in Spanish as Salado or Verdolaga seca, and in Catalan as Ajocagripaus.

It has the common name of 'Grand statice', (reflecting the former name of the genus).

The specific epithet monopetalum, derived from Latin monopetalus and ultimately from Greek mono and pétalon, means one petal.

Using an earlier description by Carl Linnaeus when he had named it as Statice monopetala in his book Species Plantarum in 1753. After the genus Statice was re-classified as 'Limoniastrum', it was then first published as Limoniastrum monopetalum (L.) Boiss by Pierre Edmond Boissier in 'Prodromus Systematis Naturalis Regni Vegetabilis' Vol.12 on page 689 in 1848.

It was verified by United States Department of Agriculture Agricultural Research Service on 9 August 1995, as Limoniastrum monopetalum, and it is an RHS Accepted name and was last-listed in the RHS Plant Finder in 2016.

== Distribution and habitat ==
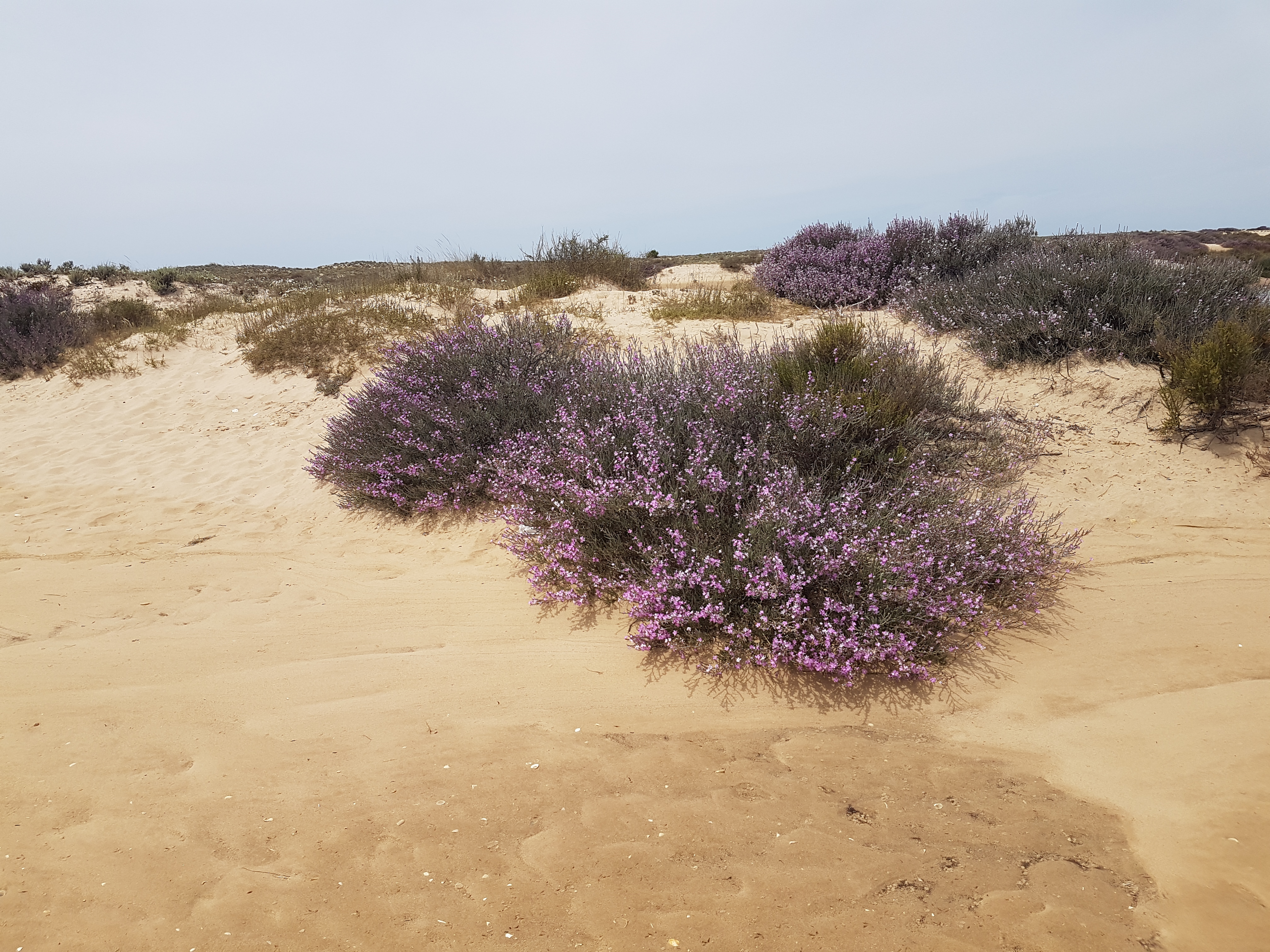
Plants growing in the sand dunes, Ria Formosa in the Algarve, Portugal

Limoniastrum monopetalum is native to temperate areas between Europe, Northern Africa and Western Asia.

=== Range ===
It is found in Europe, in the Mediterranean countries of Portugal, Corsica, Spain, France, Greece, Balearic Islands of Mallorca and Menorca, and Italy (incl. Sardinia and Sicily). Within North Africa and Asia, it is found in Algeria, Libya and Egypt.

It has been introduced to Morocco and Tunisia.

Since 1995, it has been found in the Canary Islands.

=== Habitat ===
In Egypt, it is found in salt marshes, coastal sand dunes and rocky ridges habitats. It is also found in the dunes of the salt marsh around Lake Manzala and Lake Mariut, on the west Mediterranean coast and also the salt marshes near Sallum. In Portugal, it is found in salt marshes with Atriplex portulacoides.

It is often found growing alone.

== Protection status ==
It appears on the list of plant species protected throughout mainland France.

== Cultivation ==
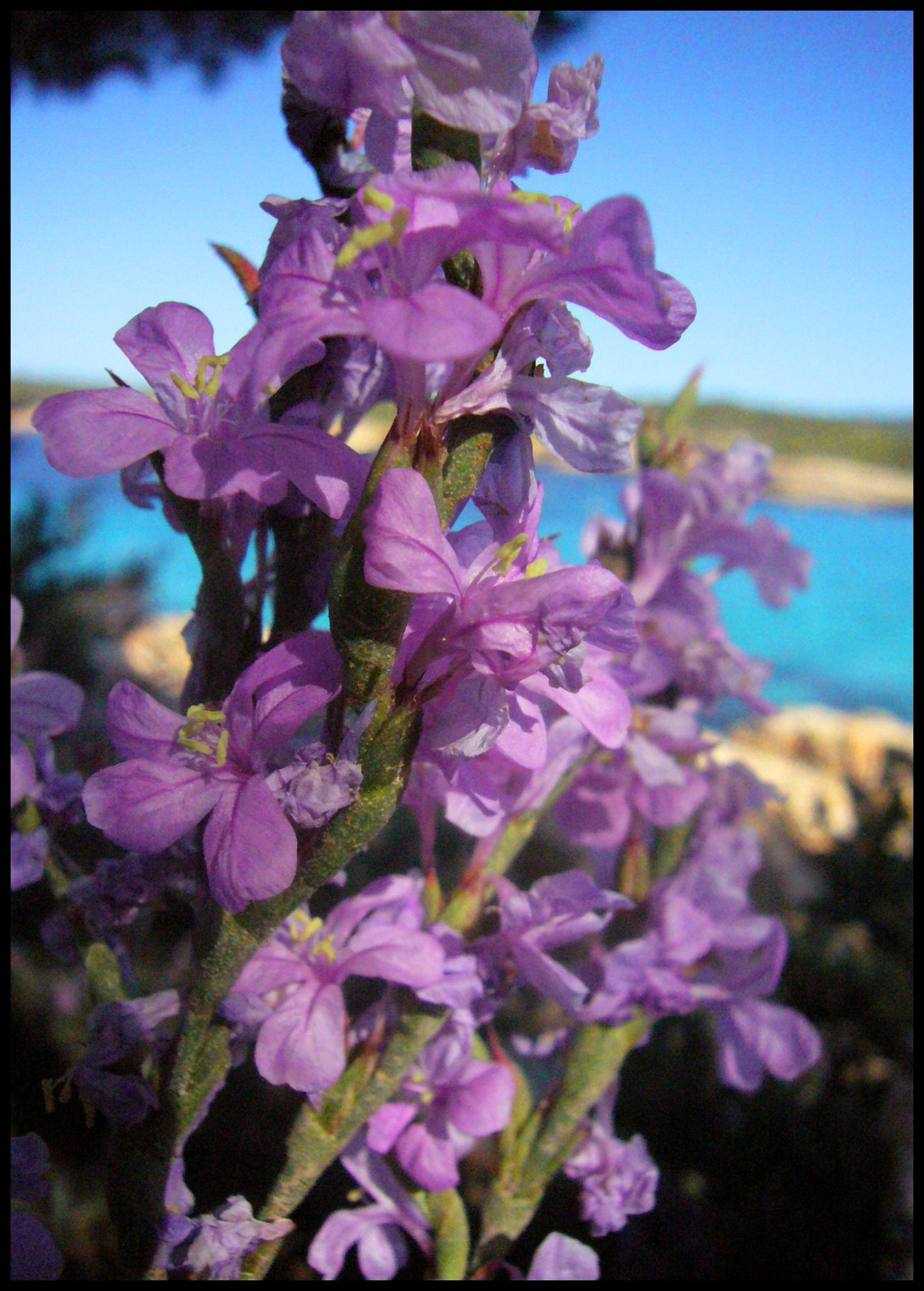
Close-up of the flowers, taken in Ibiza, Spain

L. monopetalum is hardy enough for a Mediterranean climate. It can take sporadic frosts down to −5 °C (23 °F). This means between USDA Zone 10a and Zone 11.

It can grow in any type of soil, even in poor and salty soils, and it grows well in sandy soils, and can tolerate neutral or acidic soils (with pH levels between 6.6 and 7.8).

It prefers to grow in positions in full sun, but is very resistant to drought, and pollution.

It is suitable for coastal planting, and they have been used in Mediterranean coastal gardens to cover slopes, planted in bushy groups and in pots and planters. They can combine well with plants of the genus; Cistus, Salvia, Rosmarinus, Eriocephalus and Bupleurum. In the Baleares, it has been grown as a groundcover for motorway roadsides, although in some littoral (near shore) areas it has become naturalized.

They are not usually attacked by the usual Mediterranean pests and diseases.

=== Propagation ===
Limoniastrum monopetalum can be propagated in summer by cuttings, using the stem-tip method or by In vitro micropropagation. It was noted that cuttings taken in the winter or the spring, were more successful than those collected in summer or autumn.

== Cultivars ==
There is one known cultivar; Limoniastrum monopetalum 'Carnaval' which is an evergreen subshrub that forms a mound, and has fleshy, spoon-shaped to narrowly lance-shaped, grey-green leaves and magenta flowers that bloom from early summer to early autumn. It is frost hardy.

== Uses ==
Limoniastrum monopetalum is a traditional medicinal species which a leaf infusion exhibits anti-dysenteric properties against infectious diseases. L. monopetalum and Limoniastrum guyonianum have been studied for antioxidant status.

Limoniastrum monopetalum is used as fodder for camels, especially during the winter. It is also used in farms as a fuel source.

The shrub is also an ecological habitat of a large number of insects such as Lepidoptera and Hymenoptera (including Oecocecis guyonella, Acalyptris limoniastri), as the larvae feed on the plant and they create a gall on a branch, in which to pupate.

In southern Tunisia, these galls are used to tan leather and in the dyeing of hair. They can also be used medically, an infusion (tea) of galls and the leaf is used against infectious or parasitic disease causing diarrhoea.

Limoniastrum monopetalum is a potential plant to be used for xeriscaping, and landscape architecture in semi-arid Mediterranean areas, especially with poor, saline, neglected or degraded soils. It also has ecological value, as a sand accumulator (using the roots), salt tolerant windbreak.

=== Soil Contamination ===
In Al-Alamein, Egypt near (El-Hammra station, the main crude oil pipeline terminal) the environment is contaminated with crude oil spill as a result of various activities from refineries; such as oilfield blowouts, tanker and pipeline break-ups. The area was previously a mixture of various common halophytes species. However, Limoniastrum monopetalum is now the only recorded species found growing in the oil-contaminated soil, since 2002. A 2011 study was carried out on the L. monopetalum populations established on the crude oil polluted soil.

It has been also found that the plant's salt glands can also absorb small amounts of cadmium (Cd) and lead (Pb). It can also absorb zinc (Zn). This means the plant has phytoremediation potentials.

== Other sources ==
- Castrviejo Bolibar, Santiago & al. (eds.), Iberian flora ... Vol.II Platanaceae-Plumbaginaceae, 1990

Media related to Limoniastrum monopetalum at Wikimedia Commons Data related to Limoniastrum monopetalum at Wikispecies
