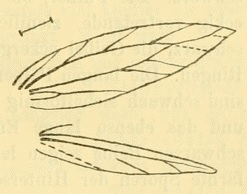
- Wings

Scientific classification
- Domain: Eukaryota
- Kingdom: Animalia
- Phylum: Arthropoda
- Class: Insecta
- Order: Lepidoptera
- Family: Gelechiidae
- Genus: Catatinagma
- Species: C. trivittellum

Binomial name
- Catatinagma trivittellum Rebel, 1903

Synonyms
- Apatetris trivittellum

= Catatinagma trivittellum =

Species of moth

Catatinagma trivittellum is a moth of the family Gelechiidae. It is found in France, Hungary, North Macedonia, Greece and Russia. It was recently recorded from Bulgaria.

The wingspan is about 9 mm for males and 6.5 mm for females. The ground colour of the forewings is dull white and the hindwings are bright grey.
