= Metanarsia dahurica =

Scientific classification
- Domain: Eukaryota
- Kingdom: Animalia
- Phylum: Arthropoda
- Class: Insecta
- Order: Lepidoptera
- Family: Gelechiidae
- Genus: Metanarsia
- Species: M. dahurica

Binomial name
- Metanarsia dahurica Bidzilya, 2005

Species of moth

Metanarsia dahurica is a moth of the family Gelechiidae. It is found in Russia and Mongolia. The habitat consists of steppes.

The length of the forewings is 9–11 mm. Adults are on wing in June.
