= Apatetris halimilignella =

Scientific classification
- Domain: Eukaryota
- Kingdom: Animalia
- Phylum: Arthropoda
- Class: Insecta
- Order: Lepidoptera
- Family: Gelechiidae
- Genus: Apatetris
- Species: A. halimilignella

Binomial name
- Apatetris halimilignella (Walsingham, 1904)

Synonyms
- Proactica halimilignella Walsingham, 1904; Anacampsis acutella Chrétien, 1908

Species of moth

Apatetris halimilignella is a moth of the family Gelechiidae. It was described by Lord Walsingham in 1904. It is found in Algeria.

The wingspan is 8–9 mm. The forewings are cream-white, barred with fawn-ochreous, of which there is a spot at the base of the costa, a straight transverse fascia at one-third, a broader one at the middle, and a still broader band covering the apex and termen. On the bands is a slight dusting of black scales along the costa, and a group of the same forms an elongate spot on the outer half of the central fascia about its middle. The hindwings are shining, iridescent rosy grey.

The larvae feed on Atriplex halimus. They form small lateral galls on the stems of their host plant. Pupation takes place within the stem.
