= Metanarsia junctivittella =

Scientific classification
- Domain: Eukaryota
- Kingdom: Animalia
- Phylum: Arthropoda
- Class: Insecta
- Order: Lepidoptera
- Family: Gelechiidae
- Genus: Metanarsia
- Species: M. junctivittella

Binomial name
- Metanarsia junctivittella Christoph, 1885

Species of moth

Metanarsia junctivittella is a moth of the family Gelechiidae. It is found in southern and south-eastern Kazakhstan, Uzbekistan, Turkmenistan, Tajikistan, Afghanistan and Pakistan.

The length of the forewings is 6–9 mm. Adults are on wing from the end of April to late June.
