= Metanarsia kosakewitshi =

Scientific classification
- Kingdom: Animalia
- Phylum: Arthropoda
- Clade: Pancrustacea
- Class: Insecta
- Order: Lepidoptera
- Family: Gelechiidae
- Genus: Metanarsia
- Species: M. kosakewitshi

Binomial name
- Metanarsia kosakewitshi Piskunov, 1990

Species of moth

Metanarsia kosakewitshi is a moth of the family Gelechiidae. It is found in south-eastern Kazakhstan.

The length of the forewings is about 11 mm. Adults are on wing in June.
