= Platyedra cunctatrix =

Scientific classification
- Kingdom: Animalia
- Phylum: Arthropoda
- Class: Insecta
- Order: Lepidoptera
- Family: Gelechiidae
- Genus: Platyedra
- Species: P. cunctatrix

Binomial name
- Platyedra cunctatrix Meyrick, 1931

Species of moth

Platyedra cunctatrix is a moth of the family Gelechiidae. It was described by Edward Meyrick in 1931. It is found in the Democratic Republic of the Congo (North Kivu) and Uganda.

The larvae feed on Hibiscus species.
