= Epiphthora cryolopha =

Scientific classification
- Domain: Eukaryota
- Kingdom: Animalia
- Phylum: Arthropoda
- Class: Insecta
- Order: Lepidoptera
- Family: Gelechiidae
- Genus: Epiphthora
- Species: E. cryolopha

Binomial name
- Epiphthora cryolopha Meyrick, 1904

Species of moth

Epiphthora cryolopha is a moth of the family Gelechiidae. It was described by Edward Meyrick in 1904. It is found in Australia, where it has been recorded from Queensland.

The wingspan is about 14 mm (0.55 in). The forewings are greyish ochreous, the veins broadly suffused with white so as almost to obscure the ground colour. There is a broad white costal streak, occupying two-fifths of the wing, from the base to near the apex, narrowed posteriorly, the lower edge straight. The hindwings are whitish grey.
