= Epiphthora leucomichla =

Scientific classification
- Domain: Eukaryota
- Kingdom: Animalia
- Phylum: Arthropoda
- Class: Insecta
- Order: Lepidoptera
- Family: Gelechiidae
- Genus: Epiphthora
- Species: E. leucomichla

Binomial name
- Epiphthora leucomichla Meyrick, 1904

Species of moth

Epiphthora leucomichla is a moth of the family Gelechiidae. It was described by Edward Meyrick in 1904. It is found in Australia, where it has been recorded from Tasmania and New South Wales.

The wingspan is 14–15 mm (0.55–0.59 in). The forewings are shining white, with some scattered fuscous or dark fuscous scales and an outwardly oblique bar from the middle of the dorsum reaching halfway across the wing, a spot on the tornus, a spot on the costa at three-fourths, and an ochreous-fuscous terminal suffusion towards the apex, or indicated by dark fuscous irroration (sprinkling) only. The hindwings are grey.
