= Epiphthora drosias =

Scientific classification
- Domain: Eukaryota
- Kingdom: Animalia
- Phylum: Arthropoda
- Class: Insecta
- Order: Lepidoptera
- Family: Gelechiidae
- Genus: Epiphthora
- Species: E. drosias

Binomial name
- Epiphthora drosias Meyrick, 1904

Species of moth

Epiphthora drosias is a moth of the family Gelechiidae. It was described by Edward Meyrick in 1904. It is found in Australia, where it has been recorded from South Australia.

The wingspan is 10–11 mm (0.39–0.43 in). The forewings are white, sprinkled with dark fuscous. The hindwings are light grey.
