= Metanarsia scythiella =

Scientific classification
- Kingdom: Animalia
- Phylum: Arthropoda
- Class: Insecta
- Order: Lepidoptera
- Family: Gelechiidae
- Genus: Metanarsia
- Species: M. scythiella

Binomial name
- Metanarsia scythiella Ponomarenko, 2000

Species of moth

Metanarsia scythiella is a moth of the family Gelechiidae. It is found in Russia (Tuva, Ubsa-Noor Lake). The habitat consists of arid areas.

The length of the forewings is about 11.5 mm.
