= Epiphthora zalias =

Scientific classification
- Domain: Eukaryota
- Kingdom: Animalia
- Phylum: Arthropoda
- Class: Insecta
- Order: Lepidoptera
- Family: Gelechiidae
- Genus: Epiphthora
- Species: E. zalias

Binomial name
- Epiphthora zalias (Meyrick, 1922)

Synonyms
- Apatetris zalias Meyrick, 1922

Species of moth

Epiphthora zalias is a moth of the family Gelechiidae. It was described by Edward Meyrick in 1922. It is found in Australia, where it has been recorded from South Australia.

The wingspan is about 13 mm. The forewings are white, suffusedly speckled with yellowish grey except on the margins. There are some darker specks towards the apex. The hindwings are white.
