= Epiphthora isonira =

Scientific classification
- Domain: Eukaryota
- Kingdom: Animalia
- Phylum: Arthropoda
- Class: Insecta
- Order: Lepidoptera
- Family: Gelechiidae
- Genus: Epiphthora
- Species: E. isonira

Binomial name
- Epiphthora isonira Meyrick, 1904

Species of moth

Epiphthora isonira is a moth of the family Gelechiidae. It was described by Edward Meyrick in 1904. It is found in Australia, where it has been recorded from New South Wales.

The wingspan is 9–11 mm (0.35–0.43 in). The forewings are white, more or less thinly irrorated (sprinkled) with dark fuscous and with small dark fuscous spots beneath the costa at one-sixth and one-third, and in the disc at one-sixth. There is a curved oblique dark fuscous bar from the middle of the dorsum, reaching halfway across the wing, sometimes interrupted. A dark fuscous spot is found on the tornus. All these markings vary in distinctness. The hindwings are pale grey.
