= Metanarsia trisignella =

Scientific classification
- Domain: Eukaryota
- Kingdom: Animalia
- Phylum: Arthropoda
- Class: Insecta
- Order: Lepidoptera
- Family: Gelechiidae
- Genus: Metanarsia
- Species: M. trisignella

Binomial name
- Metanarsia trisignella Bidzilya, 2008

Synonyms
- Catatinagma trisignella

Species of moth

Metanarsia trisignella is a moth of the family Gelechiidae. It is found in Uzbekistan, Turkmenistan and south-eastern Kazakhstan.

The wingspan is 10–14 mm. Adults are on wing from April to June.
