= Epiphthora hexagramma =

Scientific classification
- Kingdom: Animalia
- Phylum: Arthropoda
- Clade: Pancrustacea
- Class: Insecta
- Order: Lepidoptera
- Family: Gelechiidae
- Genus: Epiphthora
- Species: E. hexagramma

Binomial name
- Epiphthora hexagramma (Meyrick, 1921)

Synonyms
- Apatetris hexagramma Meyrick, 1921

Species of moth

Epiphthora hexagramma is a moth of the family Gelechiidae. It was described by Edward Meyrick in 1921. It is found in Australia, where it has been recorded from Queensland.

The wingspan is about 15 mm. The forewings are white with about six irregular longitudinal slender streaks of fuscous irradiation (sprinkles). The hindwings are rather dark grey.
