= Lanceoptera =

Scientific classification
- Domain: Eukaryota
- Kingdom: Animalia
- Phylum: Arthropoda
- Class: Insecta
- Order: Lepidoptera
- Family: Gelechiidae
- Subfamily: Apatetrinae
- Genus: Lanceoptera; Janse, 1960
- Species: L. panochra

Binomial name
- Lanceoptera panochra Janse, 1960

Genus of moths

Lanceoptera is a genus of moths in the family Gelechiidae. It contains the species Lanceoptera panochra, which is found in South Africa.
