= Epiphthora harpastis =

Scientific classification
- Domain: Eukaryota
- Kingdom: Animalia
- Phylum: Arthropoda
- Class: Insecta
- Order: Lepidoptera
- Family: Gelechiidae
- Genus: Epiphthora
- Species: E. harpastis

Binomial name
- Epiphthora harpastis Meyrick, 1904

Species of moth

Epiphthora harpastis is a moth of the family Gelechiidae. It was described by Edward Meyrick in 1904. It is found in Australia, where it has been recorded from Western Australia.

The wingspan is 10–11 mm (0.39–0.43 in). The forewings are whitish, irrorated (sprinkled) with dark fuscous and with a very indistinct darker slender transverse fascia at one-third, slightly oblique. There is an oblique bar from the middle of the dorsum, and a spot on the tornus darker, very obscure. The hindwings are light grey.
