= Epiphthora autoleuca =

Scientific classification
- Domain: Eukaryota
- Kingdom: Animalia
- Phylum: Arthropoda
- Class: Insecta
- Order: Lepidoptera
- Family: Gelechiidae
- Genus: Epiphthora
- Species: E. autoleuca

Binomial name
- Epiphthora autoleuca Meyrick, 1904

Species of moth

Epiphthora autoleuca is a moth of the family Gelechiidae. It was described by Edward Meyrick in 1904. It is found in Australia, where it has been recorded from Victoria.

The wingspan is about 15 mm (0.59 in). The forewings are white, with a few minute fuscous speckles posteriorly. The hindwings are light grey.
