= Metanarsia alphitodes =

Scientific classification
- Kingdom: Animalia
- Phylum: Arthropoda
- Class: Insecta
- Order: Lepidoptera
- Family: Gelechiidae
- Genus: Metanarsia
- Species: M. alphitodes

Binomial name
- Metanarsia alphitodes (Meyrick, 1891)

Synonyms
- Calyptrotis alphitodes Meyrick, 1891; Metanarsia gobica Lvovsky & Piskunov, 1989

Species of moth

Metanarsia alphitodes is a moth of the family Gelechiidae. It is found in Algeria, south-eastern Kazakhstan, Turkmenistan, Uzbekistan and Mongolia.

The length of the forewings is 5–7 mm. Adults are on wing from mid-May to the end of June.

Larvae have been reared from Nitraria species. The species overwinters in the larval stage.
