= Metanarsia modesta =

Scientific classification
- Domain: Eukaryota
- Kingdom: Animalia
- Phylum: Arthropoda
- Class: Insecta
- Order: Lepidoptera
- Family: Gelechiidae
- Genus: Metanarsia
- Species: M. modesta

Binomial name
- Metanarsia modesta Staudinger, 1871

Synonyms
- Metanarsia modesta kurdistanella Amsel, 1959

Species of moth

Metanarsia modesta is a moth of the family Gelechiidae. It is found in southern Italy, Romania, Ukraine, Turkey, Armenia, north-eastern Iran, Iraq, Turkmenistan, Uzbekistan, Russia (the southern and south-eastern European part), and south-eastern and northern Kazakhstan. The habitat consists of steppes.

The length of the forewings is 6–10 mm. Adults are on wing from early May to late July.
