= Platyedra erebodoxa =

Scientific classification
- Kingdom: Animalia
- Phylum: Arthropoda
- Class: Insecta
- Order: Lepidoptera
- Family: Gelechiidae
- Genus: Platyedra
- Species: P. erebodoxa

Binomial name
- Platyedra erebodoxa Meyrick, 1927

Species of moth

Platyedra erebodoxa is a moth of the family Gelechiidae. It was described by Edward Meyrick in 1927. It is found in the Democratic Republic of the Congo (Kasai-Occidental, Maniema) and Cameroon.

The wingspan is 17–19 mm. The forewings are light brownish ochreous irregularly mixed with dark fuscous and with a dark bluish-fuscous spot on the base of the costa. The dorsum is narrowly suffused with dark fuscous and there is a suffused dark fuscous transverse fascia before the middle. The posterior two-fifths is wholly dark fuscous except a pale brownish-ochreous spot on the costa at four-fifths and a dot on the tornus opposite. The hindwings are grey.

The larvae feed on Hibiscus diversifolius and Dombeya emarginata.
