= Apatetris mirabella =

Scientific classification
- Domain: Eukaryota
- Kingdom: Animalia
- Phylum: Arthropoda
- Class: Insecta
- Order: Lepidoptera
- Family: Gelechiidae
- Genus: Apatetris
- Species: A. mirabella

Binomial name
- Apatetris mirabella Staudinger, 1880

Species of moth

Apatetris mirabella is a moth of the family Gelechiidae. It was described by Otto Staudinger in 1880. It is found in Asia Minor.

The wingspan is about 13 mm. The forewings are white and yellow, with numerous black scales. The hindwings are white, sprinkled with black scales.
