= Epiphthora phantasta =

Scientific classification
- Domain: Eukaryota
- Kingdom: Animalia
- Phylum: Arthropoda
- Class: Insecta
- Order: Lepidoptera
- Family: Gelechiidae
- Genus: Epiphthora
- Species: E. phantasta

Binomial name
- Epiphthora phantasta Meyrick, 1904

Species of moth

Epiphthora phantasta is a moth of the family Gelechiidae. It was described by Edward Meyrick in 1904. It is found in Australia, where it has been recorded from New South Wales.

The wingspan is 11–14 mm (0.43–0.55 in). The forewings are pale greyish ochreous, irrorated (sprinkled) with fuscous and with an outwardly oblique bar from the middle of the dorsum to the middle of the disc, an undefined spot on the tornus, and a cloudy dash beyond it towards the apex dark fuscous, sometimes nearly obsolete. The hindwings are very pale grey.
