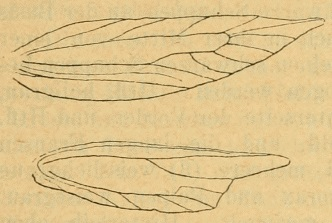
- Wings

Scientific classification
- Kingdom: Animalia
- Phylum: Arthropoda
- Class: Insecta
- Order: Lepidoptera
- Family: Gelechiidae
- Genus: Coloptilia
- Species: C. conchylidella

Binomial name
- Coloptilia conchylidella (Hofman, 1898)

Synonyms
- Colopteryx conchylidella Hofman, 1898; Catatinagma conchylidella

= Coloptilia conchylidella =

Species of moth

Coloptilia conchylidella is a moth of the family Gelechiidae. It is found in Portugal, Spain, Turkey and Russia.

The length of the forewings is about 5 mm. The ground colour of the forewings is dirty white, sprinkled with blackish and brownish scales. The hindwings are bright grey.
