= Epiphthora achnias =

Scientific classification
- Domain: Eukaryota
- Kingdom: Animalia
- Phylum: Arthropoda
- Class: Insecta
- Order: Lepidoptera
- Family: Gelechiidae
- Genus: Epiphthora
- Species: E. achnias

Binomial name
- Epiphthora achnias Meyrick, 1904

Species of moth

Epiphthora achnias is a moth of the family Gelechiidae. It was described by Edward Meyrick in 1904. It is found in Australia, where it has been recorded from New South Wales.

The wingspan is about 11 mm (0.43 in). The forewings are white, irrorated (sprinkled) with golden fuscous and with an oblique bar from the middle of the dorsum reaching half across the wing, and a golden-fuscous spot on the tornus. The hindwings are grey.
