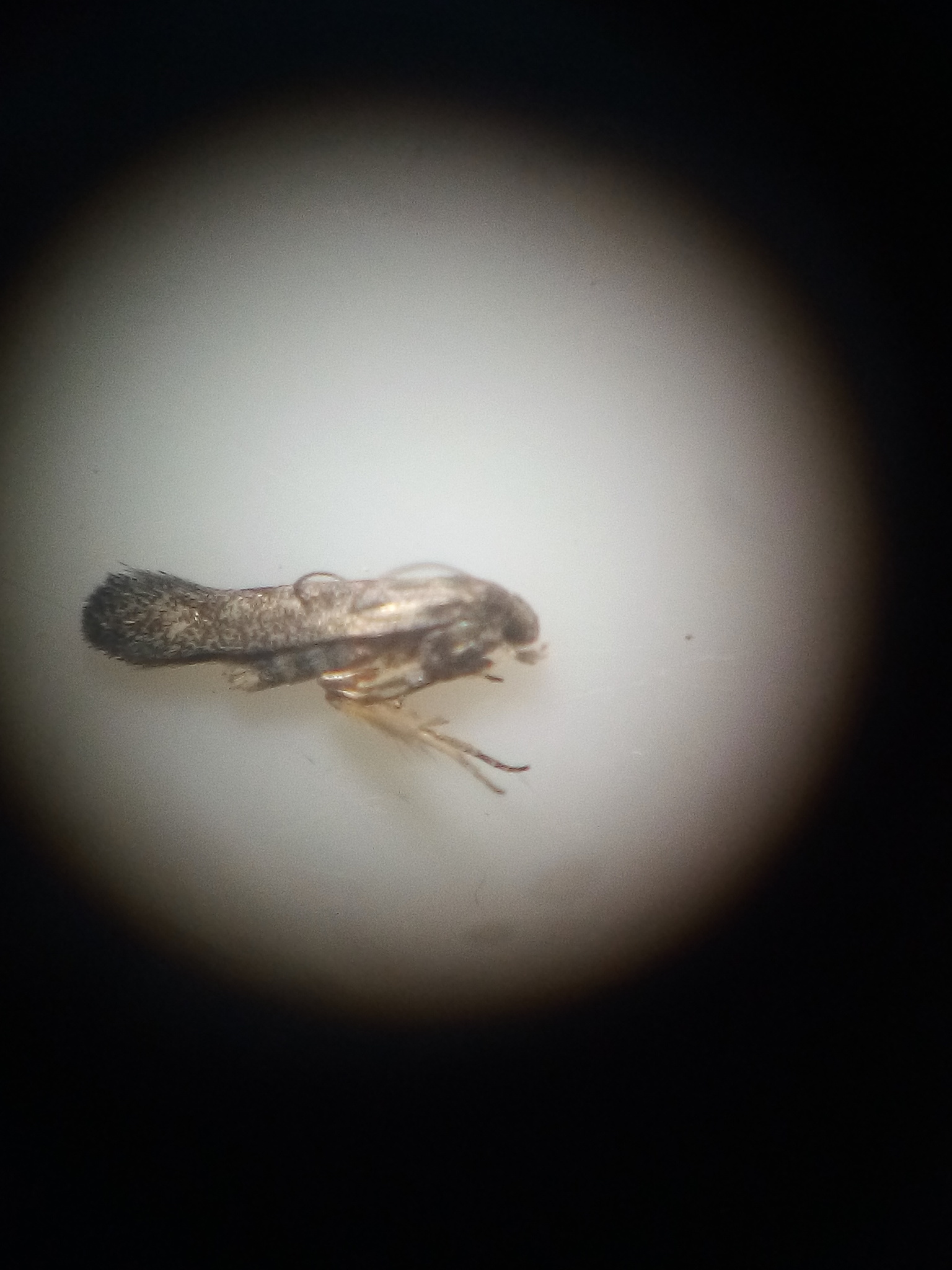

Scientific classification
- Kingdom: Animalia
- Phylum: Arthropoda
- Clade: Pancrustacea
- Class: Insecta
- Order: Lepidoptera
- Family: Gelechiidae
- Genus: Epiphthora
- Species: E. melanombra

Binomial name
- Epiphthora melanombra Meyrick, 1888

Synonyms
- Apatetris melanombra (Meyrick, 1888); Gelechia sparsa Philpott, 1918

= Epiphthora melanombra =

Species of moth endemic to New Zealand

Epiphthora melanombra is a moth of the family Gelechiidae. It was first described by Edward Meyrick in 1888. It is endemic to New Zealand.

== Taxonomy ==
E. melanombra was first described by Edward Meyrick in 1888 using specimens bred by Richard William Fereday in Christchuch. This species is the type species of Epiphthora by original monotypy. In 1918 Alfred Philpott, thinking he was describing a new species, named this moth Gelechia sparsa. In 1923 Meyrick placed this species in the genus Apatetris and synonymised Gelechia sparsa with that name. Morris Watt discussed and illustrated this species under the name Apatetris melanombra and agreed with Meyricks synonymies. George Hudson discussed and illustrated this species under the name Apatetris melanombra in his 1928 book The butterflies and moths of New Zealand. The male lectotype is held at the Natural History Museum, London.

== Description ==
Illustration by Hudson.

Meyrick described E. melanombra as follows:

Male, female. — 10-11 mm. Head, palpi, antennae, thorax, abdomen and legs whitish, densely irrorated with black, appearing grey. Forewings elongate, pointed, apex subcaudate ; whitish densely irrorated with black, appearing grey ; a suffused blackish spot in disc before middle, another on anal angle, and a third less apparent towards apex : cilia grey, round apex whitish irrorated with black. Hindwings and cilia grey.

Adults of E. melanombra vary in depth of blackish shading and intensity of markings. The much paler form occurs in Dunedin, which was described by Philpott as Gelechia sparsa.

== Distribution ==
E. melanombra is endemic to New Zealand. It is found throughout the country.

== Habitat and hosts ==
The larvae mine blotches in the leaves of Olearia avicenniaefolia.
