= Epiphthora dinota =

Scientific classification
- Domain: Eukaryota
- Kingdom: Animalia
- Phylum: Arthropoda
- Class: Insecta
- Order: Lepidoptera
- Family: Gelechiidae
- Genus: Epiphthora
- Species: E. dinota

Binomial name
- Epiphthora dinota (Turner, 1933)

Synonyms
- Apatetris dinota Turner, 1933

Species of moth

Epiphthora dinota is a moth of the family Gelechiidae. It was described by Alfred Jefferis Turner in 1933. It is found in Australia, where it has been recorded from Queensland.

The wingspan is about 13 mm. The forewings are white with fine scanty fuscous irroration. The markings are dark fuscous. There are subcostal dots at one-fifth and two-fifths and a spot above the mid-dorsum, obliquely placed, followed by a median dot. There is also a subapical dot. The hindwings are whitish.
