= Anapatetris =

Scientific classification
- Kingdom: Animalia
- Phylum: Arthropoda
- Class: Insecta
- Order: Lepidoptera
- Family: Gelechiidae
- Subfamily: Apatetrinae
- Genus: Anapatetris; Janse, 1951
- Species: A. crystallista

Binomial name
- Anapatetris crystallista (Meyrick, 1911)

Synonyms
- Epiphthora crystallista Meyrick, 1911

Genus of moths

Anapatetris is a genus of moths in the family Gelechiidae. It contains the species Anapatetris crystallista, which is found in Gauteng, South Africa.

The wingspan is about 10 mm. The forewings are white, sprinkled with black specks suffused with brownish, especially along the costa and dorsum and on two longitudinal streaks in the disc above and below middle, the upper extending from the base to three-quarters, the lower shorter, and three longitudinal marks before and beyond the tornus and at the apex. The hindwings are light grey.
