= Epiphthora microtima =

Scientific classification
- Domain: Eukaryota
- Kingdom: Animalia
- Phylum: Arthropoda
- Class: Insecta
- Order: Lepidoptera
- Family: Gelechiidae
- Genus: Epiphthora
- Species: E. microtima

Binomial name
- Epiphthora microtima Meyrick, 1904

Species of moth

Epiphthora microtima is a moth of the family Gelechiidae. It was described by Edward Meyrick in 1904. It is found in Australia, where it has been recorded from Queensland.

The wingspan is about 11 mm (0.43 in). The forewings are light greyish ochreous, irrorated (sprinkled) with fuscous and obscurely sprinkled with whitish. The hindwings are dark fuscous.
