= Epiphthora belonodes =

Scientific classification
- Domain: Eukaryota
- Kingdom: Animalia
- Phylum: Arthropoda
- Class: Insecta
- Order: Lepidoptera
- Family: Gelechiidae
- Genus: Epiphthora
- Species: E. belonodes

Binomial name
- Epiphthora belonodes Meyrick, 1904

Species of moth

Epiphthora belonodes is a moth of the family Gelechiidae. It was described by Edward Meyrick in 1904. It is found in Australia, where it has been recorded from Western Australia.

The wingspan is 13–14 mm (0.51–0.55 in). The forewings are whitish, densely irrorated (sprinkled) with dark fuscous and with an undefined white streak along the submedian fold. The hindwings are grey.
