= Epiphthora coniombra =

Scientific classification
- Domain: Eukaryota
- Kingdom: Animalia
- Phylum: Arthropoda
- Class: Insecta
- Order: Lepidoptera
- Family: Gelechiidae
- Genus: Epiphthora
- Species: E. coniombra

Binomial name
- Epiphthora coniombra Meyrick, 1904

Species of moth

Epiphthora coniombra is a moth of the family Gelechiidae. It was described by Edward Meyrick in 1904. It is found in Australia, where it has been recorded from New South Wales.

The wingspan is about 11 mm (0.43 in). The forewings are white, closely irrorated (sprinkled) with rather dark fuscous. The hindwings are fuscous.
