= Epiphthora acrocola =

Scientific classification
- Domain: Eukaryota
- Kingdom: Animalia
- Phylum: Arthropoda
- Class: Insecta
- Order: Lepidoptera
- Family: Gelechiidae
- Genus: Epiphthora
- Species: E. acrocola

Binomial name
- Epiphthora acrocola Turner, 1927

Species of moth

Epiphthora acrocola is a moth of the family Gelechiidae. It was described by Alfred Jefferis Turner in 1927. It is found in Australia, where it has been recorded from Tasmania.

The wingspan is about 17 mm. The forewings are whitish, finely and fairly uniformly irrorated with grey-brown. The hindwings are grey.
