= Neopatetris =

Scientific classification
- Domain: Eukaryota
- Kingdom: Animalia
- Phylum: Arthropoda
- Class: Insecta
- Order: Lepidoptera
- Family: Gelechiidae
- Subfamily: Apatetrinae
- Genus: Neopatetris; Janse, 1960
- Species: N. tenuis

Binomial name
- Neopatetris tenuis Janse, 1960

Genus of moths

Neopatetris is a genus of moths in the family Gelechiidae. It contains the species Neopatetris tenuis, which is found in Namibia and South Africa.
