= Metanarsia amseli =

Scientific classification
- Domain: Eukaryota
- Kingdom: Animalia
- Phylum: Arthropoda
- Class: Insecta
- Order: Lepidoptera
- Family: Gelechiidae
- Genus: Metanarsia
- Species: M. amseli

Binomial name
- Metanarsia amseli Bidzilya, 2008

Species of moth

Metanarsia amseli is a moth of the family Gelechiidae. It is found in southern Iran.

The wingspan is about 12 mm. Adults are on wing in early April.
