= Metanarsia incertella =

Scientific classification
- Domain: Eukaryota
- Kingdom: Animalia
- Phylum: Arthropoda
- Class: Insecta
- Order: Lepidoptera
- Family: Gelechiidae
- Genus: Metanarsia
- Species: M. incertella

Binomial name
- Metanarsia incertella (Herrich-Schaffer, 1861)

Synonyms
- Anacampsis incertella Herrich-Schaffer, 1861; Epiparasia incertella; Epiparasia longivitella Rebel, 1914; Epidola halmyropsis Meyrick, 1926; Gelechia rhamiferella Lucas, 1940

Species of moth

Metanarsia incertella is a moth of the family Gelechiidae. It is found in Spain, Algeria, Morocco, Tunisia, Turkey, Russia, Kazakhstan, Uzbekistan, western China and Mongolia.

The length of the forewings is 8–13 mm. Adults are on wing from May to early August.
