= Metanarsia guberlica =

Scientific classification
- Kingdom: Animalia
- Phylum: Arthropoda
- Clade: Pancrustacea
- Class: Insecta
- Order: Lepidoptera
- Family: Gelechiidae
- Genus: Metanarsia
- Species: M. guberlica

Binomial name
- Metanarsia guberlica Nupponen, 2010

Species of moth

Metanarsia guberlica is a moth of the family Gelechiidae. It is found in Russia (the southern Ural). The habitat consists of rocky steppe slopes.

The wingspan is 15.5–16 mm.
