= Platyedra subcinerea =

Scientific classification
- Kingdom: Animalia
- Phylum: Arthropoda
- Class: Insecta
- Order: Lepidoptera
- Family: Gelechiidae
- Genus: Platyedra
- Species: P. subcinerea

Binomial name
- Platyedra subcinerea (Haworth, 1828)

Synonyms
- Recurvaria subcinerea Haworth, 1828; Gelechia vilella Zeller, 1847; argillosella Herrich-Schäffer, 1855; Gelechia bathrosticta Meyrick, 1936; Anacampsis parviocellatella Bruand, 1850

Species of moth

Platyedra subcinerea, the mallow groundling or cotton stem moth, is a moth of the family Gelechiidae. It is found in most of Europe. It is an in introduced species in North America, where it has been recorded from New England and California, and has also been introduced to New Zealand. The habitat consists of wet meadows, marshes and gardens.

The wingspan is 14–21 mm.

The larvae feed on Parietaria officinalis, Urtica species, Althaea officinalis, Lavatera thuringiaca and Malva sylvestris.
