= Platyedra =

Scientific classification
- Domain: Eukaryota
- Kingdom: Animalia
- Phylum: Arthropoda
- Class: Insecta
- Order: Lepidoptera
- Family: Gelechiidae
- Tribe: Pexicopiini
- Genus: Platyedra; Meyrick, 1895

Synonyms
- Aratrognathosia Gozmány, 1968

Genus of moths

Platyedra is a genus of moth in the family Gelechiidae.

== Species ==
- Platyedra cunctatrix Meyrick, 1931
- Platyedra erebodoxa Meyrick, 1927
- Platyedra piceicoma Meyrick, 1931
- Platyedra subcinerea (Haworth, 1828) (=Anacampsis parviocellatella Bruand, 1850)
