= Porpodryas =

Scientific classification
- Domain: Eukaryota
- Kingdom: Animalia
- Phylum: Arthropoda
- Class: Insecta
- Order: Lepidoptera
- Family: Gelechiidae
- Tribe: Pexicopiini
- Genus: Porpodryas; Meyrick, 1920
- Species: P. prasinantha

Binomial name
- Porpodryas prasinantha Meyrick, 1920

Genus of moths

Porpodryas is a genus of moth in the family Gelechiidae. It contains the species Porpodryas prasinantha, which is found in French Guiana.

The wingspan is about 31 mm. The forewings are whitish irregularly sprinkled grey and dark fuscous with seven small narrow oblique semi-oval blackish spots along the costa, the space between the third and fourth suffused dark grey, beneath this space an adjacent quadrate grey spot partly edged blackish, edged beneath by a discal dark grey streak mixed with light green and extended to the end of the cell. There are short fine blackish dashes beneath the costa and above the dorsum near the base and a longer blackish line on the fold before the middle. There is an oval spot outlined with grey beneath the anterior part of the discal median streak and a strongly angulated grey subterminal shade, marked with some blackish dashes between the veins. Some short blackish marks are found before the posterior part of the costa and termen, and some cloudy marginal dots. The hindwings are subhyaline prismatic whitish, with the apex narrowly suffused grey.
