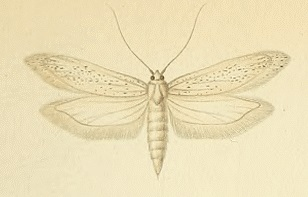

Scientific classification
- Kingdom: Animalia
- Phylum: Arthropoda
- Clade: Pancrustacea
- Class: Insecta
- Order: Lepidoptera
- Family: Gelechiidae
- Tribe: Apatetrini
- Genus: Oecocecis; Guenée, 1870
- Species: O. guyonella

Binomial name
- Oecocecis guyonella Guenée, 1870

= Oecocecis =

Genus of moths

Oecocecis is a genus of moths in the family Gelechiidae. It contains the species Oecocecis guyonella, which is found in southern Europe (France, Sicily and Cyprus), North Africa and Syria.

The larvae feed on Limoniastrum guyonianum and Limoniastrum monopetalum. They create a brownish-red hard, spherical gall on the tender branch or peduncle of their host plant. Pupation takes place within the gall.

== Gallery ==
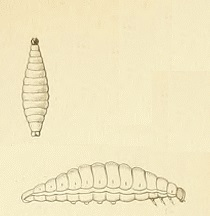
Larva

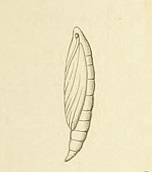
Pupa

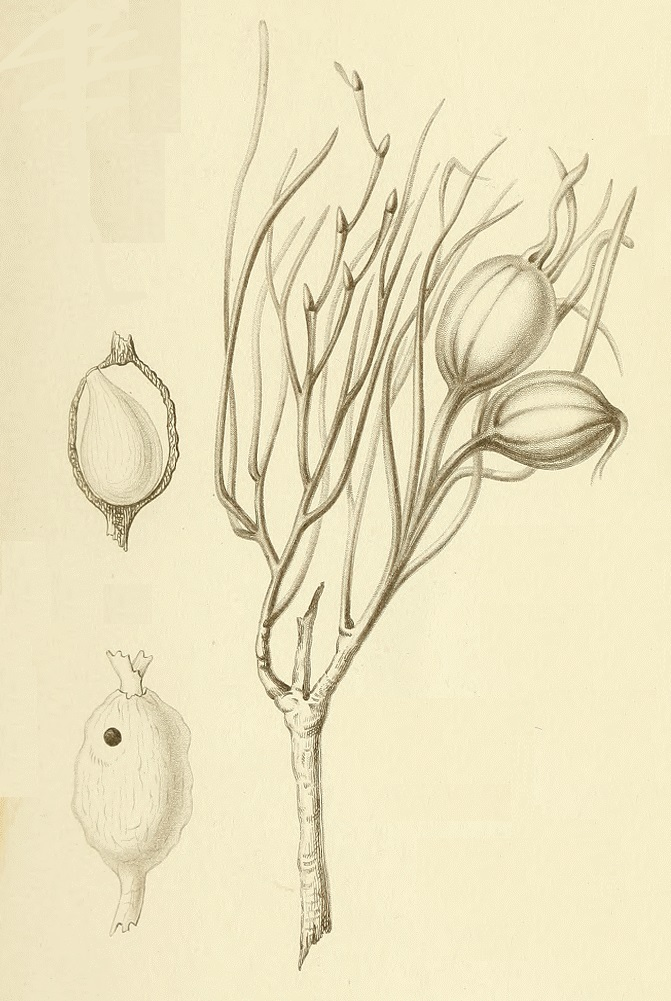
Biology
