= Galtica =

Scientific classification
- Domain: Eukaryota
- Kingdom: Animalia
- Phylum: Arthropoda
- Class: Insecta
- Order: Lepidoptera
- Family: Gelechiidae
- Genus: Galtica; Busck, 1914
- Species: G. venosa

Binomial name
- Galtica venosa Busck, 1914

Genus of moths

Galtica is a genus of moths in the family Gelechiidae. It contains the species Galtica venosa, which is found in Panama.

The wingspan is about 18 mm. The forewings are deep dull black with a broad, ill-defined, yellow band across the wing near base and with all the veins on the outer half of the wing indicated by narrow, yellow lines. There is an irregular aggregation of yellow scales at the tornus. The hindwings are dark fuscous.
