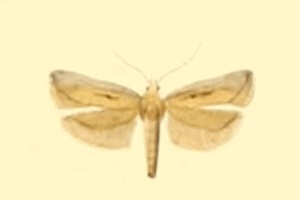
- Metanarsia onzella

Scientific classification
- Kingdom: Animalia
- Phylum: Arthropoda
- Clade: Pancrustacea
- Class: Insecta
- Order: Lepidoptera
- Family: Gelechiidae
- Tribe: Apatetrini
- Genus: Metanarsia; Staudinger, 1871

Synonyms
- Calyptrotis Meyrick, 1891; Epiparasia Rebel, 1914; Parametanarsia Gerasimov, 1930

= Metanarsia =

Genus of moths

Metanarsia is a genus of moths in the family Gelechiidae.

== Species ==
- modesta group:
  - Metanarsia dahurica
  - Metanarsia kosakewitshi
  - Metanarsia modesta
  - Metanarsia mongola
  - Metanarsia monochroma
  - Metanarsia onzella
  - Metanarsia piskunovi
  - Metanarsia scythiella
- junctivittella group:
  - Metanarsia junctivittella
- alphitodes group:
  - Metanarsia alphitodes
- incertella group:
  - Metanarsia incertella
- partilella group:
  - Metanarsia partilella
- unknown species group
  - Metanarsia amseli
  - Metanarsia guberlica
  - Metanarsia moroccana
  - Metanarsia trisignella
