= Dactylotula altithermella =

Scientific classification
- Domain: Eukaryota
- Kingdom: Animalia
- Phylum: Arthropoda
- Class: Insecta
- Order: Lepidoptera
- Family: Gelechiidae
- Genus: Dactylotula
- Species: D. altithermella

Binomial name
- Dactylotula altithermella (Walsingham, 1903)

Synonyms
- Didactylota altithermella Walsingham, 1903; Apatetris altithermella

Species of moth

Dactylotula altithermella is a species of moth of the family Gelechiidae. It is found in Spain, France, Austria, the Czech Republic and Hungary. The wingspan is 10–12 mm. The forewings are white, sprinkled with slaty bluish grey scales. The hindwings are bluish grey.
