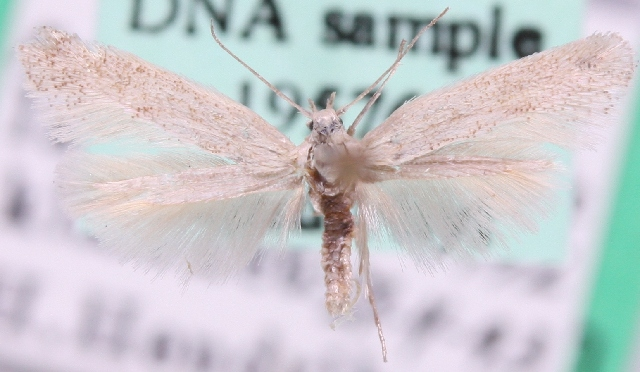

Scientific classification
- Kingdom: Animalia
- Phylum: Arthropoda
- Class: Insecta
- Order: Lepidoptera
- Family: Gelechiidae
- Genus: Dactylotula
- Species: D. kinkerella

Binomial name
- Dactylotula kinkerella (Snellen, 1876)

Synonyms
- Dactylota kinkerella Snellen, 1876; Apatetris kinkerella

= Dactylotula kinkerella =

Species of moth

Dactylotula kinkerella is a moth of the family Gelechiidae. It is found from Sweden to the Pyrenees and Alps, and from the Netherlands to Ukraine. It is also found in Croatia and Russia (the southern Ural). The habitat consists of sandy areas.

The wingspan is 9–13 mm.

The larvae feed on Ammophila arenaria. They mine the leaves of their host plant. Larvae can be found from September to May.
