= Dactylotula =

Scientific classification
- Domain: Eukaryota
- Kingdom: Animalia
- Phylum: Arthropoda
- Class: Insecta
- Order: Lepidoptera
- Family: Gelechiidae
- Tribe: Apatetrini
- Genus: Dactylotula; Cockerell, 1888

Synonyms
- Dactylota Snellen, 1876 (junior homonym of Dactylota Brandt, 1835 - Replacement name : Dactylotula); Didactylota Walsingham, 1892

Genus of moths

Dactylotula is a genus of moths in the family Gelechiidae.

== Species ==
- Dactylotula altithermella (Walsingham, 1903)
- Dactylotula kinkerella (Snellen, 1876)
