= Ficulea =

Scientific classification
- Kingdom: Animalia
- Phylum: Arthropoda
- Class: Insecta
- Order: Lepidoptera
- Family: Gelechiidae
- Genus: Ficulea; Walker, 1864
- Species: F. blandulella

Binomial name
- Ficulea blandulella Walker, 1864

Genus of moths

Ficulea is a genus of moths in the family Gelechiidae. It contains the species Ficulea blandulella, which is found in Sri Lanka and southern India.

Adults are luteous, the forewings with two dark cupreous-brown slightly silvery bordered bands. The first band very much dilated hindward and the second marginal, dentate on its inner side, nearly connected with the second on the interior border.
