= Epilechia =

Scientific classification
- Domain: Eukaryota
- Kingdom: Animalia
- Phylum: Arthropoda
- Class: Insecta
- Order: Lepidoptera
- Family: Gelechiidae
- Tribe: Pexicopiini
- Genus: Epilechia; Busck, 1939
- Species: E. catalinella

Binomial name
- Epilechia catalinella (Busck, 1907)

Synonyms
- Gelechia catalinella Busck, 1907; Gelechia tehuacana Busck, 1913

Genus of moths

Epilechia is a genus of moths in the family Gelechiidae. It contains the species Epilechia catalinella, which is found in Mexico and the southern United States (Arizona and Texas).

The wingspan is about 20 mm. The forewings are uniform blackish brown, with a purplish sheen and with striking pure white markings as follows: the entire dorsal edge from the base to the tornus white, an outwardly oblique costal streak at the basal third, reaching the middle of the wing, a narrow perpendicular transverse fascia at the apical third and an inwardly oblique curved costal streak just before the apex. The hindwings are dark blackish fuscous, with the basal half of the costa light silvery grey.

== Etymology ==
The species name catalinella refers to Catalina Springs, the type location.
