= Trachyedra =

Scientific classification
- Domain: Eukaryota
- Kingdom: Animalia
- Phylum: Arthropoda
- Class: Insecta
- Order: Lepidoptera
- Family: Gelechiidae
- Tribe: Pexicopiini
- Genus: Trachyedra; Meyrick, 1929
- Species: T. xylomorpha

Binomial name
- Trachyedra xylomorpha Meyrick, 1929

Genus of moths

Trachyedra is a genus of moth in the family Gelechiidae. It contains the species Trachyedra xylomorpha, which is found in India.

The wingspan is about 20 mm.
