= Syncratomorpha =

Scientific classification
- Kingdom: Animalia
- Phylum: Arthropoda
- Class: Insecta
- Order: Lepidoptera
- Family: Gelechiidae
- Genus: Syncratomorpha; Meyrick, 1929
- Species: S. euthetodes

Binomial name
- Syncratomorpha euthetodes Meyrick, 1929

Genus of moths

Syncratomorpha is a genus of moth in the family Gelechiidae. It contains the species Syncratomorpha euthetodes, which is found in India (the Andamans).

The wingspan is about 19 mm.
