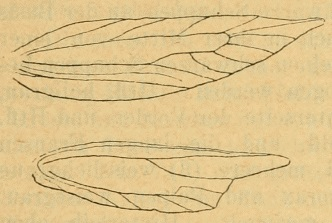
- Coloptilia conchylidella

Scientific classification
- Domain: Eukaryota
- Kingdom: Animalia
- Phylum: Arthropoda
- Class: Insecta
- Order: Lepidoptera
- Family: Gelechiidae
- Tribe: Apatetrini
- Genus: Coloptilia; T. B. Fletcher, 1940

Synonyms
- Colopteryx Hofmann, 1898 (junior homonym of Colopteryx Ridgway, 1888)

= Coloptilia =

Genus of moths

Coloptilia is a genus of moths in the family Gelechiidae described by Thomas Bainbrigge Fletcher in 1940.

== Species ==
- Coloptilia conchylidella (Hofman, 1898)
