= Filisignella =

Scientific classification
- Kingdom: Animalia
- Phylum: Arthropoda
- Clade: Pancrustacea
- Class: Insecta
- Order: Lepidoptera
- Family: Gelechiidae
- Subfamily: Gelechiinae
- Genus: Filisignella; Janse, 1951
- Species: F. cirrhaea

Binomial name
- Filisignella cirrhaea (Meyrick, 1914)

Synonyms
- Epiphthora cirrhaea Meyrick, 1914

Genus of moths

Filisignella is a monotypic moth genus in the family Gelechiidae erected by Anthonie Johannes Theodorus Janse in 1951. Its only species, Filisignella cirrhaea, was first described by Edward Meyrick in 1914. It is found in South Africa.

The wingspan is about 16 mm. The forewings are white, tinged with yellowish posteriorly. The hindwings are light grey.
