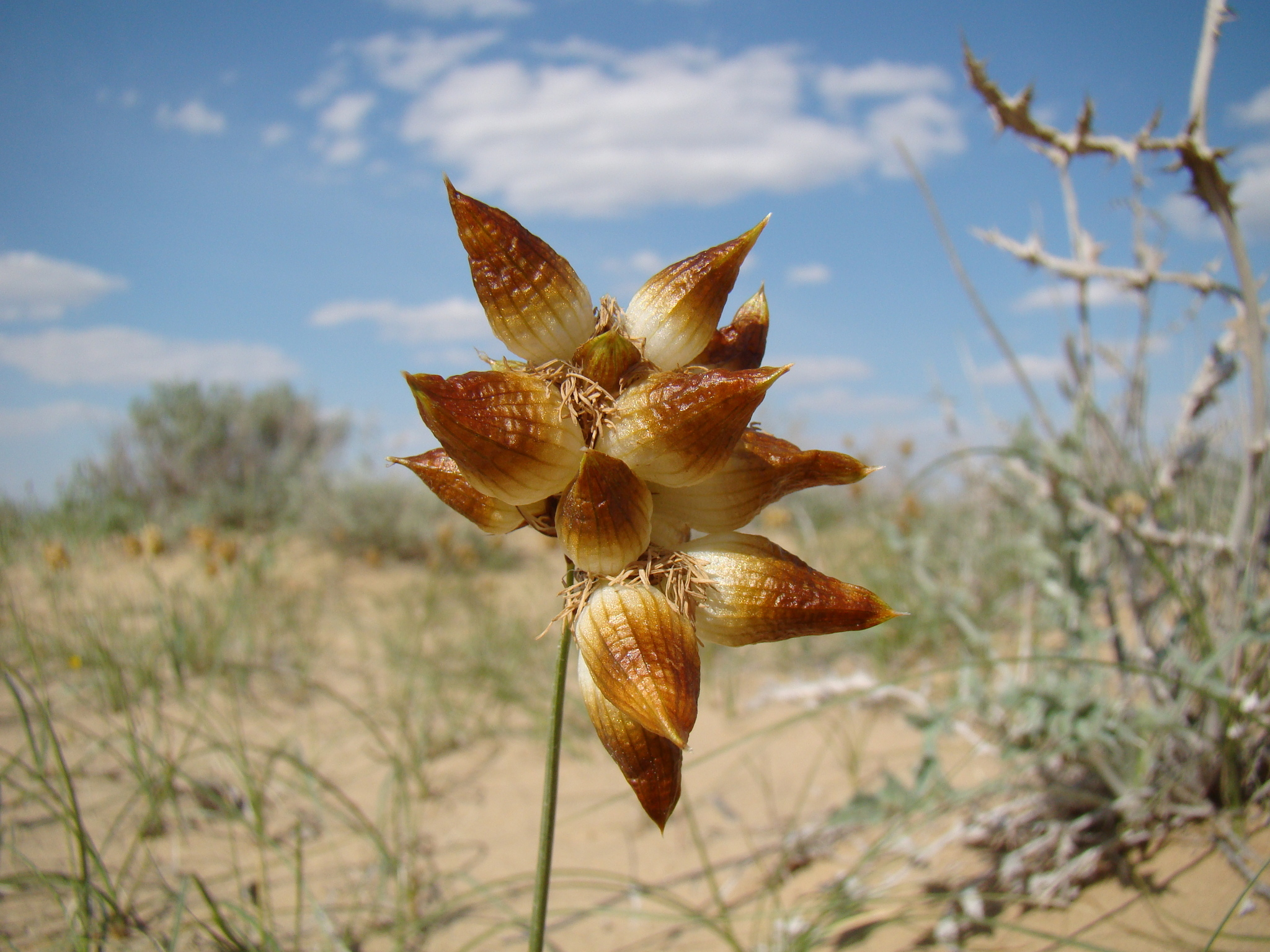
- Spike
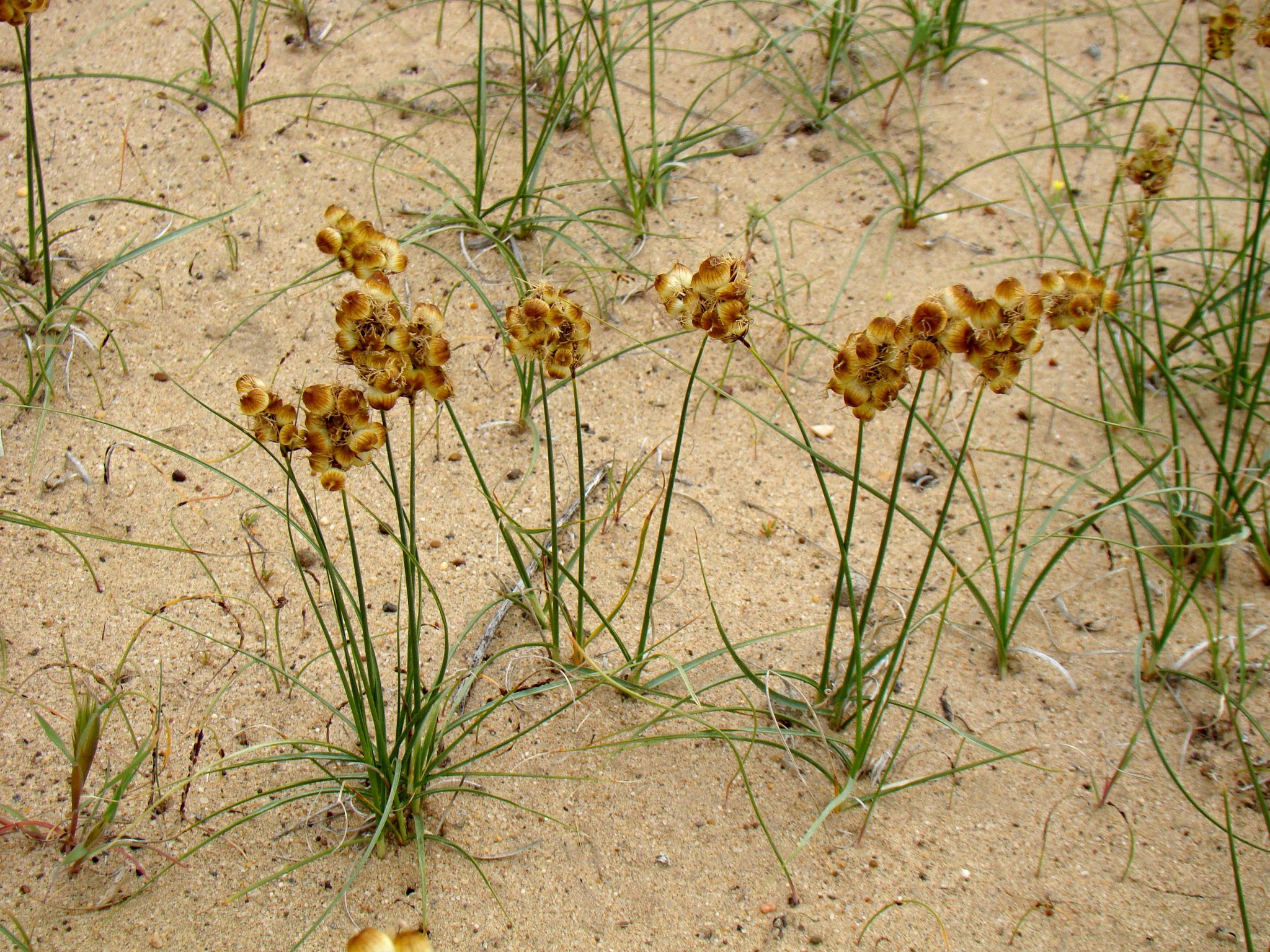
- Habit

Scientific classification
- Kingdom: Plantae
- Clade: Tracheophytes
- Clade: Angiosperms
- Clade: Monocots
- Clade: Commelinids
- Order: Poales
- Family: Cyperaceae
- Genus: Carex
- Species: C. physodes

Binomial name
- Carex physodes M.Bieb.

Synonyms
- Carex physodes subsp. subphysodes Popov ex V.I.Krecz.

= Carex physodes =

Species of plant in the sedge family

Carex physodes is a species of true sedge (family Cyperaceae), native to southern Russia, the northern Caucasus, Central Asia, Iran, Afghanistan, Pakistan, and Xinjiang in China. It is a spring ephemeral.

== Description ==
C. Physodes is a species of sedge, growing between 20 and 25 cm in height. Stems are erect, clothed with pale brown sheaths at base. Leaves are shorter than the stem, with blades that are greenish, linear, slightly curved, with scabrous margins. Inflorescence is dense, oblong-ovate or subglobose. Female glumes are brown, broadly ovate-lanceolate. Utricles are yellowish, much longer and broader than glume, ovate when young, and strongly inflated globose or elliptic at maturity, 1–1.5 × 0.5–1 cm, membranous, yellowish orange or brownish veined, with a rounded base and an apex contracted into a short beak. Flowers and fruits between April and May.

== Distribution and habitat ==
C. Physodes is adapted to a sandy desert or cold desert environment.
