= Coleostoma =

Scientific classification
- Kingdom: Animalia
- Phylum: Arthropoda
- Class: Insecta
- Order: Lepidoptera
- Family: Gelechiidae
- Tribe: Pexicopiini
- Genus: Coleostoma; Meyrick, 1922
- Species: C. entryphopa

Binomial name
- Coleostoma entryphopa Meyrick, 1922

Genus of moths

Coleostoma is a genus of moths in the family Gelechiidae. It contains the species Coleostoma entryphopa, which is found in Pará, Brazil.

The wingspan is about 15 mm. The forewings are light brownish-grey with the base narrowly dark ferruginous-fuscous, followed by slight whitish suffusion. There is an irregular ferruginous streak along the dorsum and a triangular ferruginous area, pointed anteriorly, extending along the costa from two-fifths and gradually expanded to cover the termen and tornus, marked with a deeper ferruginous streak from below the middle of its lower edge to the apex of the wing, a minute white costal dot just before this. The hindwings are dark fuscous.
