= Isembola =

Scientific classification
- Domain: Eukaryota
- Kingdom: Animalia
- Phylum: Arthropoda
- Class: Insecta
- Order: Lepidoptera
- Family: Gelechiidae
- Tribe: Pexicopiini
- Genus: Isembola; Meyrick, 1926
- Species: I. diasticta

Binomial name
- Isembola diasticta Meyrick, 1926

Genus of moths

Isembola is a genus of moths in the family Gelechiidae. It contains the species Isembola diasticta, which is found in Ecuador.

The wingspan is about 36 mm. The forewings are whitish-grey-ochreous irregularly irrorated rather dark fuscous, most densely towards the apex. The stigmata are dark fuscous, the plical very obliquely before the first discal, placed in a nearly clear ochreous-whitish streak, an additional elongate dot midway between the plical and the base, and another dot midway between the discal. The hindwings are grey-whitish.
