= Phrixocrita =

Scientific classification
- Domain: Eukaryota
- Kingdom: Animalia
- Phylum: Arthropoda
- Class: Insecta
- Order: Lepidoptera
- Family: Gelechiidae
- Tribe: Pexicopiini
- Genus: Phrixocrita; Meyrick, 1935
- Species: P. aegidopis

Binomial name
- Phrixocrita aegidopis Meyrick, 1935

Genus of moths

Phrixocrita is a monotypic moth genus in the family Gelechiidae. It contains the species Phrixocrita aegidopis, which is found in Taiwan. Both the genus and species were first described by Edward Meyrick in 1935.
