= Macracaena =

Scientific classification
- Domain: Eukaryota
- Kingdom: Animalia
- Phylum: Arthropoda
- Class: Insecta
- Order: Lepidoptera
- Family: Gelechiidae
- Tribe: Pexicopiini
- Genus: Macracaena; Common, 1958
- Species: M. adela

Binomial name
- Macracaena adela Common, 1958

Genus of moths

Macracaena is a genus of moth in the family Gelechiidae. It contains the species Macracaena adela, which is found in Australia.
