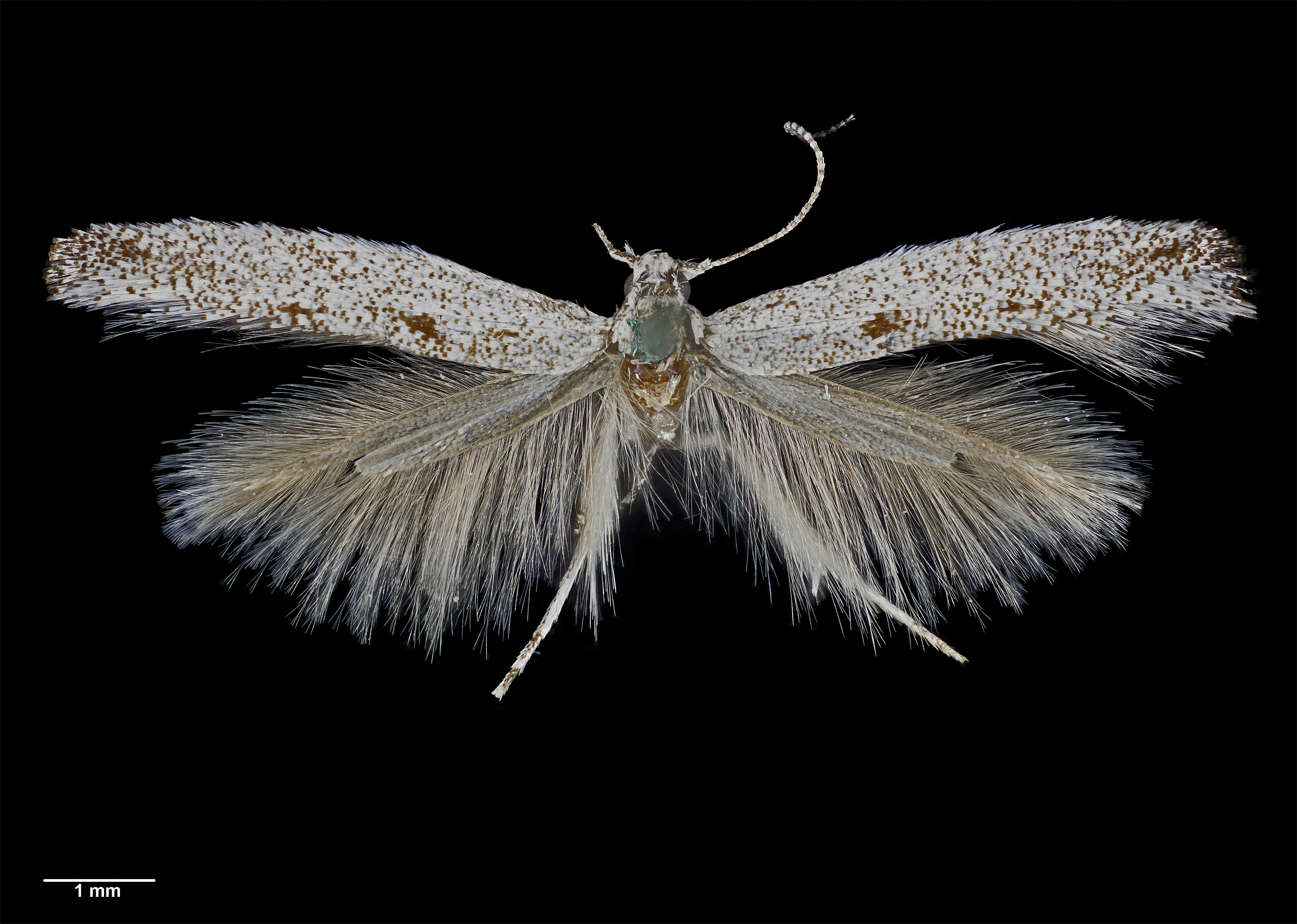
- Epiphthora nivea

Scientific classification
- Kingdom: Animalia
- Phylum: Arthropoda
- Class: Insecta
- Order: Lepidoptera
- Family: Gelechiidae
- Tribe: Apatetrini
- Genus: Epiphthora; Staudinger, 1879

Synonyms
- Stenopherna Lower, 1901

= Epiphthora =

Genus of moths

Epiphthora is a genus of moths in the family Gelechiidae.

== Species ==
- Epiphthora achnias Meyrick, 1904
- Epiphthora acrocola Turner, 1927
- Epiphthora acropasta Turner, 1919
- Epiphthora anisaula (Meyrick, 1921)
- Epiphthora autoleuca Meyrick, 1904
- Epiphthora belonodes Meyrick, 1904
- Epiphthora chionocephala (Lower, 1901)
- Epiphthora coniombra Meyrick, 1904
- Epiphthora cryolopha Meyrick, 1904
- Epiphthora delochorda Lower, 1918
- Epiphthora dinota (Turner, 1933)
- Epiphthora drosias Meyrick, 1904
- Epiphthora harpastis Meyrick, 1904
- Epiphthora hyperaenicta Turner, 1927
- Epiphthora hexagramma (Meyrick, 1921)
- Epiphthora isonira Meyrick, 1904
- Epiphthora lemurella Meyrick, 1904
- Epiphthora leptoconia Turner, 1919
- Epiphthora leucomichla Meyrick, 1904
- Epiphthora megalornis Meyrick, 1904
- Epiphthora melanombra Meyrick, 1888
- Epiphthora miarodes Meyrick, 1904
- Epiphthora microtima Meyrick, 1904
- Epiphthora niphaula Meyrick, 1904
- Epiphthora nivea (Philpott, 1930)
- Epiphthora phantasta Meyrick, 1904
- Epiphthora poliopasta Turner, 1919
- Epiphthora psychrodes Meyrick, 1904
- Epiphthora spectrella Meyrick, 1904
- Epiphthora thyellias Meyrick, 1904
- Epiphthora zalias (Meyrick, 1922)
