= Leistogenes =

Scientific classification
- Domain: Eukaryota
- Kingdom: Animalia
- Phylum: Arthropoda
- Class: Insecta
- Order: Lepidoptera
- Family: Gelechiidae
- Tribe: Pexicopiini
- Genus: Leistogenes; Meyrick, 1927
- Species: L. rebellis

Binomial name
- Leistogenes rebellis Meyrick, 1927

Genus of moths

Leistogenes is a genus of moth in the family Gelechiidae. It contains the species Leistogenes rebellis, which is found in Peru.

The wingspan is about 45 mm. The forewings are brownish-ochreous with a broad costal stripe of whitish suffusion from the base, becoming obsolete towards the apex. There is a blackish dot towards the costa near the base. The stigmata form cloudy spots of ferruginous-brown suffusion, the plical slightly before the first discal. The hindwings are pale greyish with an apical blotch of ochreous-whitish suffusion.
