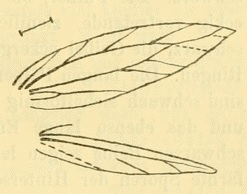
- Catatinagma trivittellum

Scientific classification
- Domain: Eukaryota
- Kingdom: Animalia
- Phylum: Arthropoda
- Class: Insecta
- Order: Lepidoptera
- Family: Gelechiidae
- Tribe: Apatetrini
- Genus: Catatinagma; Rebel 1903

= Catatinagma =

Genus of moths

Catatinagma is a genus of moth in the family Gelechiidae.

== Species ==
- Catatinagma kraterella Junnilainen & Nuppoen, 2010
- Catatinagma stenoptera Bidzilya, 2014
- Catatinagma trivittellum Rebel, 1903
