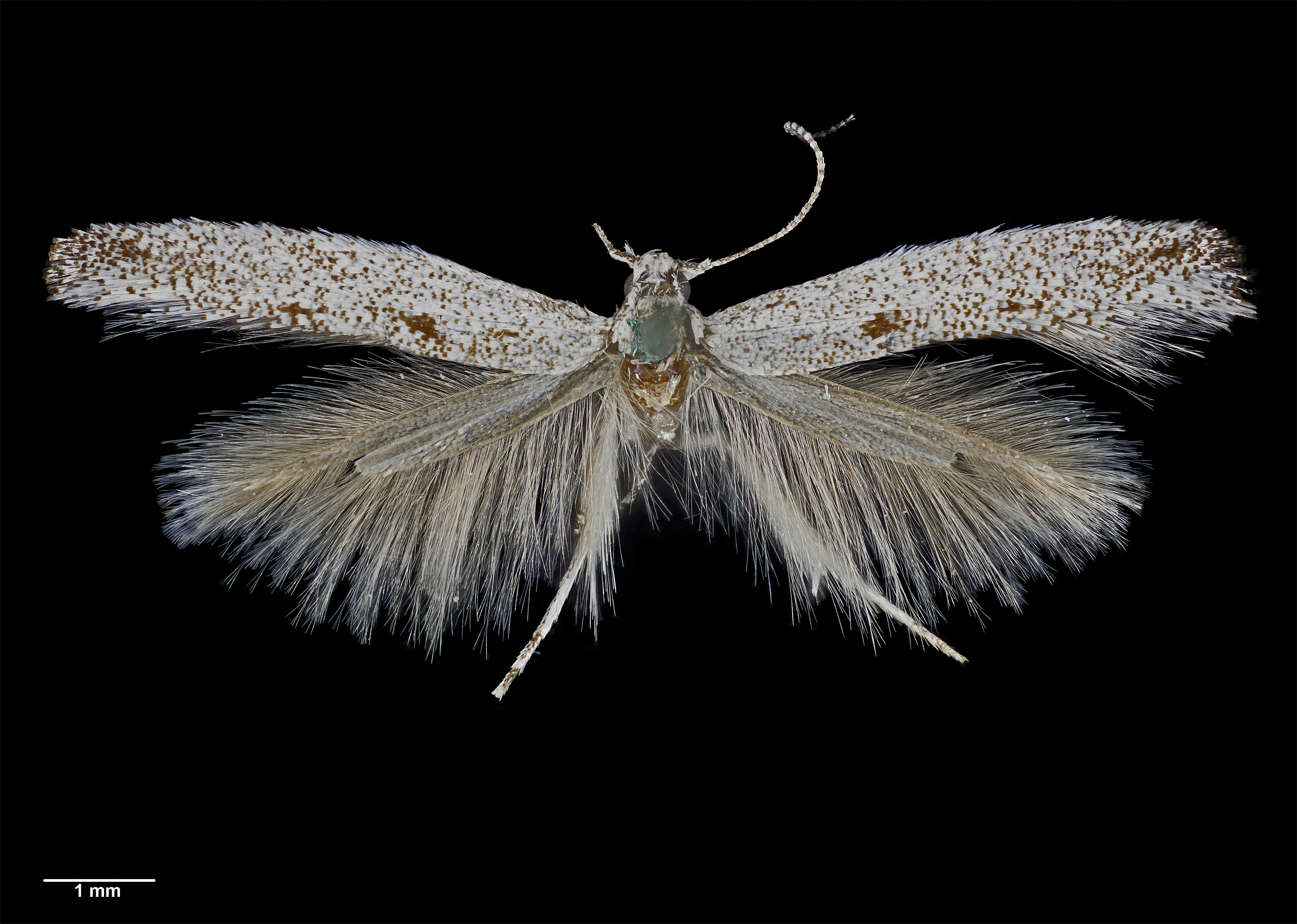
- Male holotype specimen

Scientific classification
- Kingdom: Animalia
- Phylum: Arthropoda
- Class: Insecta
- Order: Lepidoptera
- Family: Gelechiidae
- Genus: Epiphthora
- Species: E. nivea

Binomial name
- Epiphthora nivea (Philpott, 1930)

Synonyms
- Apatetris nivea Philpott, 1930

= Epiphthora nivea =

Species of moth

Epiphthora nivea is a moth of the family Gelechiidae. It was described by Philpott in 1930. It is found in New Zealand, where it has only been recorded from the Waitākere Ranges.

The larvae feed on Collospermum hastatum.
