= Melitoxoides =

Scientific classification
- Domain: Eukaryota
- Kingdom: Animalia
- Phylum: Arthropoda
- Class: Insecta
- Order: Lepidoptera
- Family: Gelechiidae
- Subfamily: Gelechiinae
- Genus: Melitoxoides; Janse, 1958

Genus of moths

Melitoxoides is a genus of moths in the family Gelechiidae.

== Species ==
- Melitoxoides cophias (Meyrick, 1913)
- Melitoxoides leucodoxa (Meyrick, 1920)

== Former species ==
- Melitoxoides eusebasta
- Melitoxoides glauca
- Melitoxoides panaula
