= Melitoxoides cophias =

Scientific classification
- Domain: Eukaryota
- Kingdom: Animalia
- Phylum: Arthropoda
- Class: Insecta
- Order: Lepidoptera
- Family: Gelechiidae
- Genus: Melitoxoides
- Species: M. cophias

Binomial name
- Melitoxoides cophias (Meyrick, 1913)

Synonyms
- Gelechia cophias Meyrick, 1913; Nothris cophias

Species of moth

Melitoxoides cophias is a moth in the family Gelechiidae. It was described by Edward Meyrick in 1913. It is found in South Africa.

The wingspan is about 19 mm. The forewings are light fuscous sprinkled with darker fuscous and black and with the base of the dorsum pale, surmounted by a cloudy spot of fuscous suffusion. The stigmata are blackish, the discal approximated, the plical very obliquely before the first discal. There is some indistinct fuscous suffusion running from above the discal stigmata to the costa before the apex. The hindwings are grey, darker posteriorly.
