= Melitoxoides leucodoxa =

Scientific classification
- Domain: Eukaryota
- Kingdom: Animalia
- Phylum: Arthropoda
- Class: Insecta
- Order: Lepidoptera
- Family: Gelechiidae
- Genus: Melitoxoides
- Species: M. leucodoxa

Binomial name
- Melitoxoides leucodoxa (Meyrick, 1920)

Synonyms
- Gelechia leucodoxa Meyrick, 1920; Nothris leucodoxa

Species of moth

Melitoxoides leucodoxa is a moth in the family Gelechiidae. It was described by Edward Meyrick in 1920. It is found in South Africa.

The wingspan is 14–15 mm. The forewings are light grey, more or less wholly overlaid with ochreous white and with blackish markings. There is a rather broad basal fascia, the outer edge obtusely angulated below the middle and a moderate irregular-edged slightly oblique fascia at two-fifths, not reaching the dorsum. A rather broad transverse fascia is found at two-thirds with an anterior projection above the middle, and containing an irregular white spot in the disc sometimes extending to the posterior edge. There is also an irregular apical spot. The hindwings are whitish grey.
