= List of gelechiid genera: T =

The large moth family Gelechiidae contains the following genera:

- Tabernillaia
- Tahla
- Tanycyttara
- Taygete
- Tecia
- Teleiodes
- Teleiopsis
- Telephata
- Telphusa
- Tenera
- Thaumaturgis
- Theisoa
- Thiognatha
- Thiotricha
- Thistricha
- Thriophora
- Thrypsigenes
- Thymosopha
- Thyrsostoma
- Tila
- Tildenia
- Tiranimia
- Tornodoxa
- Tosca
- Toxidoceras
- Toxotacma
- Trachyedra
- Tricerophora
- Trichembola
- Tricyanaula
- Tricyphistis
- Tritadelpha
- Trychnopalpa
- Trypanisma
- Trypherogenes
- Tsochasta
- Turcopalpa
- Tuta
