= List of gelechiid genera: M =

The large moth family Gelechiidae contains the following genera:

- Macracaena
- Macrenches
- Macrocalcara
- Magonympha
- Megacraspedus
- Melitoxestis
- Melitoxoides
- Menecratistis
- Meridorma
- Merimnetria
- Mesophleps
- Metabolaea
- Metanarsia
- Metaplatyntis
- Metatactis
- Meteoristis
- Metopios
- Metopleura
- Metzneria
- Mirificarma
- Mnesistega
- Molopostola
- Mometa
- Monochroa
- Myconita
