= List of gelechiid genera: L =

The large moth family Gelechiidae contains the following genera:

- Lacharissa
- Lachnostola
- Lacistodes
- Lanceopenna
- Lanceoptera
- Larcophora
- Laris
- Lasiarchis
- Lata
- Latrologa
- Leistogenes
- Leptogeneia
- Lerupsia
- Leucogoniella
- Leucophylla
- Leuronoma
- Lexiarcha
- Limenarchis
- Lioclepta
- Locharcha
- Logisis
- Lophaeola
- Lutilabria
- Lysipatha
