= List of gelechiid genera: B =

The large moth family Gelechiidae contains the following genera:

- Bactropaltis
- Bagdadia
- Barticeja
- Batenia
- Battaristis
- Belovalva
- Beltheca
- Besciva
- Bilobata
- Blastovalva
- Brachmia
- Bruchiana
- Bryotropha
