= List of gelechiid genera: D =

The large moth family Gelechiidae contains the following genera:

- Dactylethrella
- Daltopora
- Darlia
- Decatopseustis
- Deltophora
- Dendrophilia
- Dentivalva
- Desmaucha
- Diastaltica
- Dichomeris
- Dicranucha
- Diprotochaeta
- Dirhinosia
- Dissoptila
- Distinxia
- Dolerotricha
- Dorycnopa
- Drepanoterma
- Dubitationis

== Bibliography ==
- Natural History Museum Lepidoptera genus database
