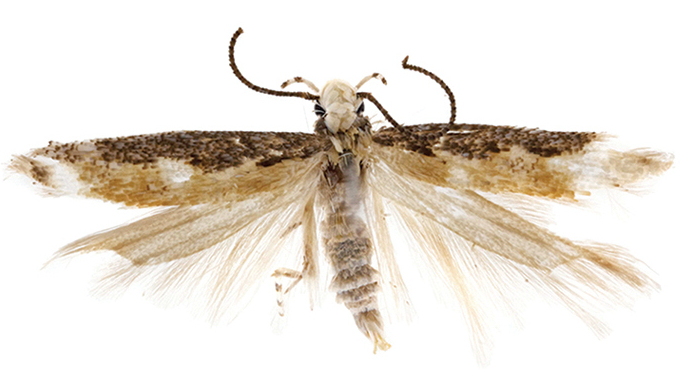
- Neopalpa donaldtrumpi

Scientific classification
- Kingdom: Animalia
- Phylum: Arthropoda
- Clade: Pancrustacea
- Class: Insecta
- Order: Lepidoptera
- Family: Gelechiidae
- Subfamily: Gelechiinae; Stainton, 1854

Synonyms
- Gelechianae Walsingham, 1891; Palumbininae Chapman, 1902; Anomologidae Meyrick, 1926; Stomopteryginae Heslop, 1938; Stomopteryxinae Heslop, 1938; Hypatiminae Kloet & Hincks, 1945; Apatetrinae Le Marchand, 1947; Chelariinae Heslop, 1938; Chelariinae Le Marchand, 1947; Chrysoesthiidae Paclt, 1947; Metzneriinae Piskunov, 1975

= Gelechiinae =

Subfamily of moths

Gelechiinae is a subfamily of moths in the family Gelechiidae. It was described by Henry Tibbats Stainton in 1854.

== Taxonomy ==
The subfamily includes the following tribes and genera:

- Litini Bruand, 1859
  - Agnippe Chambers, 1872
  - Altenia Sattler, 1960
  - Angustialata Omelko, 1988
  - Arcutelphusa Lee & Brown, 2008
  - Argyrolacia Keifer, 1936
  - Arogalea Walsingham, 1910
  - Carpatolechia Capuse, 1964
  - Chorivalva Omelko, 1988
  - Coleotechnites Chambers, 1880
  - Concubina Omelko & Omelko, 2004
  - Exoteleia Wallengren, 1881
  - Glauce Chambers, 1875
  - Istrianis Meyrick, 1918
  - Neotelphusa Janse, 1958
  - Parachronistis Meyrick, 1925
  - Parastenolechia Kanazawa, 1985
  - Piskunovia Omelko, 1988
  - Pragmatodes Walsingham, [1908]
  - Protoparachronistis Omelko, 1986
  - Pseudotelphusa Janse, 1958
  - Pubitelphusa Lee & Brown, 2013
  - Recurvaria Haworth, 1828
  - Schistophila Chrétien, 1899
  - Schneidereria Weber, 1957
  - Sergeya Ponomarenko, 2007
  - Sinoe Chambers, 1873
  - Stenolechia Meyrick, 1894
  - Stenolechiodes Elsner, [1996]
  - Streyella Janse, 1958
  - Teleiodes Sattler, 1960
  - Teleiopsis Sattler, 1960
  - Telphusa Chambers, 1872
  - Xenolechia Meyrick, 1895
- Gelechiini Stainton, 1854
  - Araeovalva Janse, 1960
  - Arla Clarke, 1942
  - Armatophallus Bidzilya, 2015
  - Aroga Busck, 1914
  - Athrips Billberg, 1820
  - Calliprora Meyrick, 1914
  - Chionodes Hübner, [1825]
  - Eudactylota Walsingham, 1911
  - Faculta Busck, 1939
  - Fascista Busck, 1939
  - Filatima Busck, 1939
  - Friseria Busck, 1939
  - Gelechia Hübner, [1825]
  - Metopleura Busck, 1912
  - Mirificarma Gozmány, 1955
  - Neodactylota Busck in Dyar, [1903]
  - Neofriseria Sattler, 1960
  - Parathectis Janse, 1958
  - Peltasta Bidzilya, 2010
  - Prolita Leraut, 1993
  - Pseudochelaria Dietz, 1900
  - Psoricoptera Stainton, 1854
  - Rifseria Hodges, 1966
  - Sarotorna Meyrick, 1904
  - Schizovalva Janse, 1951
  - Smenodoca Meyrick, 1904
  - Sophronia Hübner, [1825]
  - Sriferia Hodges, 1966
  - Stegasta Meyrick, 1904
  - Trypanisma Clemens, 1860
  - Xystophora Wocke in Heinemann & Wocke, [1876]
  - Aulidiotis Meyrick, 1925
  - Trichembola Meyrick, 1918
- Gnorimoschemini Povolný, 1964
  - Agonochaetia Povolný, 1965
  - Australiopalpa Povolný, 1974
  - Canarischema Karsholt in Landry, Nazari, Bidzilya, Huemer & Karsholt, 2017
  - Caryocolum Gregor & Povolný, 1954
  - Cosmardia Povolný, 1965
  - Ephysteris Meyrick, 1908
  - Eurysacca Povolný, 1967
  - Eurysaccoides Povolný, 1998
  - Exceptia Povolný, 1967
  - Frumenta Busck, 1939
  - Gnorimoschema Busck, 1900
  - Gobipalpa Povolný, 1973
  - Insuloschema Povolný, 2004
  - Keiferia Busck, 1939
  - Kiwaia Philpott, 1930
  - Klimeschiopsis Povolný, 1967
  - Lutilabria Povolný, 1965
  - Lysipatha Meyrick, 1926
  - Magonympha Meyrick, 1916
  - Microlechia Turati, 1924
  - Neopalpa Povolný, 1998
  - Nevadopalpa Povolný, 1998
  - Ochrodia Povolný, 1966
  - Phloeocecis Chrétien, 1908
  - Phobetica Turner, 1944
  - Phricogenes Meyrick, 1931
  - Phylopatris Meyrick, 1923
  - Phthorimaea Meyrick, 1902
  - Pogochaetia Staudinger, 1880
  - Sattleria Povolný, 1965
  - Schmidtnielsenia Povolný, 1987
  - Scrobipalpa Janse, 1951
  - Scrobipalpomima Povolný, 1985
  - Scrobipalpopsis Povolný, 1967
  - Scrobipalpula Povolný, 1964
  - Scrobipalpuloides Povolný, 1987
  - Scrobitasta Povolný, 1985
  - Symmetrischema Povolný, 1967
  - Tecia Kieffer & Jörgensen, 1910
  - Tila Povolný, 1965
  - Trychnopalpa Janse, 1958
  - Turcopalpa Povolný, 1973
  - Tuta Kieffer & Jörgensen, 1910
  - Vladimirea Povolný, 1967
- incertae sedis
  - Adelomorpha Snellen, 1885
  - Adoxotricha Meyrick, 1938
  - Adullamitis Meyrick, 1932
  - Aeolotrocha Meyrick, 1921
  - Afrotelphusa Bidzilya & Mey, 2011
  - Agathactis Meyrick, 1929
  - Allophlebia Janse, 1960
  - Allotelphusa Janse, 1958
  - Amblypalpis Ragonot, 1886
  - Amphigenes Meyrick, 1921
  - Anastreblotis Meyrick, 1927
  - Anomoxena Meyrick, 1917
  - Anthinora Meyrick, 1914
  - Apocritica Meyrick, 1925
  - Apotactis Meyrick, 1918
  - Apothetoeca Meyrick, 1922
  - Apotistatus Walsingham, 1904
  - Araeophalla Janse, 1960
  - Araeophylla Janse, 1954
  - Ardozyga Lower, 1902
  - Aregha Chrétien, 1915
  - Argophara Janse, 1963
  - Arotromima Meyrick, 1929
  - Belovalva Janse, 1963
  - Benguelasa Bidzilya & Mey, 2011
  - Bilobata Vári in Vári & Kroon, 1986
  - Encolpotis Meyrick, 1909
  - Angustiphylla Janse, 1960
  - Asapharcha Meyrick, 1920
  - Bactropaltis Meyrick, 1939
  - Barticeja Povolný, 1967
  - Batenia Chrétien, 1908
  - Bruchiana Jörgensen, 1916
  - Canthonistis Meyrick, 1922
  - Cartericella Fletcher, 1940
  - Catalexis Walsingham, 1909
  - Cerofrontia Janse, 1951
  - Charistica Meyrick, 1925
  - Chlorolychnis Meyrick, 1925
  - Chretienella Turati, 1919
  - Clistothyris Zeller, 1877
  - Cnaphostola Meyrick, 1918
  - Coconympha Meyrick, 1931
  - Colonanthes Meyrick, 1923
  - Commatica Meyrick, 1909
  - Compsosaris Meyrick, 1914
  - Coniogyra Meyrick, 1921
  - Copticostola Meyrick, 1929
  - Corynaea Turner, 1919
  - Coudia Chrétien, 1915
  - Coydalla Walker, 1864
  - Crambodoxa Meyrick, 1913
  - Craspedotis Meyrick, 1904
  - Crypsimaga Meyrick, 1931
  - Darlia Clarke, 1950
  - Diprotochaeta Diakonoff, 1941
  - Dissoptila Meyrick, 1914
  - Dolerotricha Meyrick, 1925
  - Drepanoterma Walsingham, 1897
  - Elasiprora Meyrick, 1914
  - Emmetrophysis Diakonoff, 1954
  - Empedaula Meyrick, 1918
  - Ephelictis Meyrick, 1904
  - Epibrontis Meyrick, 1904
  - Epimimastis Meyrick, 1904
  - Encentrotis Meyrick, 1921
  - Epimesophleps Rebel, 1907
  - Erikssonella Janse, 1960
  - Eripnura Meyrick, 1914
  - Eristhenodes Meyrick, 1935
  - Erythriastis Meyrick, 1925
  - Ethirostoma Meyrick, 1914
  - Euchionodes Clarke, 1950
  - Eunomarcha Meyrick, 1923
  - Euzonomacha Meyrick, 1925
  - Excommatica Janse, 1951
  - Flexiptera Janse, 1958
  - Fortinea Busck, 1914
  - Furcaphora Janse, 1958
  - Gambrostola Meyrick, 1926
  - Glycerophthora Meyrick, 1935
  - Gonaepa Walker, 1866
  - Hapalonoma Meyrick, 1914
  - Haplovalva Janse, 1958
  - Harmatitis Meyrick, 1910
  - Hemiarcha Meyrick, 1904
  - Hierangela Meyrick, 1894
  - Holcophoroides Matsumura, 1931
  - Homotima Diakonoff, 1954
  - Hypodrasia Diakonoff, [1968]
  - Irenidora Meyrick in Caradja & Meyrick, 1938
  - Ischnophenax Meyrick, 1931
  - Karwandania Amsel, 1959
  - Khoisa Bidzilya & Mey, 2011
  - Lacharissa Meyrick, 1937
  - Lachnostola Meyrick, 1918
  - Lanceopenna Janse, 1950
  - Larcophora Meyrick, 1925
  - Lasiarchis Meyrick, 1937
  - Latrologa Meyrick, 1918
  - Limenarchis Meyrick, 1926
  - Locharcha Meyrick, 1923
  - Logisis Walsingham, 1909
  - Lophaeola Meyrick, 1932
  - Melitoxestis Meyrick, 1921
  - Melitoxoides Janse, 1958
  - Menecratistis Meyrick, 1933
  - Meridorma Meyrick, 1925
  - Metabolaea Meyrick, 1923
  - Metaplatyntis Meyrick, 1938
  - Meteoristis Meyrick, 1923
  - Mnesistega Meyrick, 1918
  - Molopostola Meyrick, 1920
  - Namatetris Bidzilya & Mey, 2011
  - Narthecoceros Meyrick, 1906
  - Neolechia Diakonoff, 1948
  - Ochmastis Meyrick, 1908
  - Oncerozancla Turner, 1933
  - Ophiolechia Sattler, 1996
  - Organitis Meyrick, 1906
  - Orphanoclera Meyrick, 1925
  - Orthoptila Meyrick, 1904
  - Oxylechia Meyrick, 1917
  - Pachygeneia Meyrick, 1923
  - Palintropa Meyrick, 1913
  - Paltoloma Ghesquière, 1940
  - Pancoenia Meyrick, 1904
  - Panicotricha Meyrick, 1913
  - Parapsectris Meyrick, 1911
  - Parastega Meyrick, 1912
  - Paratelphusa Janse, 1958
  - Pavolechia Busck, 1914
  - Pelocnistis Meyrick, 1932
  - Percnarcha Meyrick, 1915
  - Petalostomella Fletcher, 1940
  - Peucoteles Meyrick, 1931
  - Phaeotypa Turner, 1944
  - Pharangitis Meyrick, 1905
  - Phthoracma Meyrick, 1921
  - Pithanurga Meyrick, 1921
  - Pityocona Meyrick, 1918
  - Platymacha Meyrick, 1933
  - Proadamas Meyrick, 1929
  - Prosodarma Meyrick, 1925
  - Proteodoxa Meyrick, 1938
  - Pseudarla Clarke, 1965
  - Pseudathrips Povolný, 1986
  - Reichardtiella Filipjev, 1931
  - Rotundivalva Janse, 1951
  - Satrapodoxa Meyrick, 1925
  - Schistovalva Janse, 1960
  - Sclerocecis Chrétien, 1908
  - Sclerograptis Meyrick, 1923
  - Sclerophantis Meyrick, 1935
  - Semophylax Meyrick, 1932
  - Sicera Chrétien, 1908
  - Sorotacta Meyrick, 1914
  - Spermanthrax Meyrick, 1936
  - Sphaleractis Meyrick, 1904
  - Sphenogrypa Meyrick, 1920
  - Stachyostoma Meyrick, 1923
  - Stagmaturgis Meyrick, 1923
  - Stenovalva Amsel, 1955
  - Steremniodes Meyrick, 1923
  - Stereodmeta Meyrick, 1931
  - Sterrhostoma Meyrick, 1935
  - Stigmatoptera Hartig, 1936
  - Strenophila Meyrick, 1913
  - Symbatica Meyrick, 1910
  - Symphanactis Meyrick, 1925
  - Synactias Meyrick, 1931
  - Syncathedra Meyrick, 1923
  - Syngelechia Janse, 1958
  - Tabernillaia Walsingham, 1911
  - Tahla Dumont, 1932
  - Tanycyttara Turner, 1933
  - Thaumaturgis Meyrick, 1934
  - Thiognatha Meyrick, 1920
  - Thriophora Meyrick, 1911
  - Thrypsigenes Meyrick, 1914
  - Thymosopha Meyrick, 1914
  - Tiranimia Chrétien, 1915
  - Toxotacma Meyrick, 1929
  - Tricerophora Janse, 1958
  - Tricyphistis Meyrick, 1934
  - Tritadelpha Meyrick, 1904
  - Trypherogenes Meyrick, 1931
  - Zelosyne Walsingham, 1911
  - Zizyphia Chrétien, 1908
