= List of gelechiid genera: H =

The large moth family Gelechiidae contains the following genera:

- Hapalonoma
- Haplochela
- Haplovalva
- Harmatitis
- Harpagidia
- Hedma
- Helcystogramma
- Heliangara
- Hemiarcha
- Hierangela
- Holaxyra
- Holcophora
- Holcophoroides
- Holophysis
- Homotima
- Horridovalva
- Hylograptis
- Hyodectis
- Hypatima
- Hyperecta
- Hypodrasia
