= List of gelechiid genera: O =

The large moth family Gelechiidae contains the following genera:

- Ochmastis
- Octonodula
- Oecocecis
- Oegoconoides
- Oestomorpha
- Oncerozancla
- Onebala
- Opacochroa
- Ophiolechia
- Organitis
- Origo
- Ornativalva
- Orsotricha
- Orthoptila
- Oxylechia
- Oxypteryx
