= List of gelechiid genera: G =

The large moth family Gelechiidae contains the following genera:

- Galtica
- Gambrostola
- Gelechia
- Geniadophora
- Gibbosa
- Gladiovalva
- Glauce
- Glycerophthora
- Gnorimoschema
- Gobipalpa
- Gonaepa
- Grandipalpa
