= List of gelechiid genera: F =

The large moth family Gelechiidae contains the following genera:

- Faculta
- Fapua
- Faristenia
- Fascista
- Ficulea
- Filatima
- Filisignella
- Flexiptera
- Fortinea
- Friseria
- Frumenta
- Furcaphora
- Furcatisacculus
