= List of gelechiid genera: R =

The large moth family Gelechiidae contains the following genera:

- Radionerva
- Recurvaria
- Reichardtiella
- Resupina
- Reuttia
- Rhadinophylla
- Rifseria
