= List of gelechiid genera: I =

The large moth family Gelechiidae contains the following genera:

- Idiobela
- Idiophantis
- Irenidora
- Iridesna
- Ischnocraspedus
- Ischnophenax
- Ischnophylla
- Isembola
- Isochasta
- Isophrictis
- Issikiopteryx
- Istrianis
- Iulota
- Ivanauskiella
- Iwaruna
