= Tahla =

Tahla may refer to:

- Tahla, Morocco, a town in Taza Province, Morocco
- Tahla (genus), a genus of moths in the family Gelechiidae
