= List of gelechiid genera: K =

The large moth family Gelechiidae contains the following genera:

- Karwandania
- Keiferia
- Kiwaia
- Klimeschiopsis
