= Paltoloma =

Scientific classification
- Kingdom: Animalia
- Phylum: Arthropoda
- Class: Insecta
- Order: Lepidoptera
- Family: Gelechiidae
- Subfamily: Gelechiinae
- Genus: Paltoloma; Ghesquière, 1940
- Species: P. paleata

Binomial name
- Paltoloma paleata Ghesquière, 1940

Genus of moths

Paltoloma is a genus of moths in the family Gelechiidae. It contains the species Paltoloma paleata, which is found in the Democratic Republic of Congo (Equateur).
