= Cerofrontia =

Scientific classification
- Domain: Eukaryota
- Kingdom: Animalia
- Phylum: Arthropoda
- Class: Insecta
- Order: Lepidoptera
- Family: Gelechiidae
- Subfamily: Gelechiinae
- Genus: Cerofrontia; Janse, 1951
- Species: C. griseotincta

Binomial name
- Cerofrontia griseotincta Janse, 1951

Genus of moths

Cerofrontia is a genus of moths in the family Gelechiidae. It contains the species Cerofrontia griseotincta, which is found in South Africa.
