= Anthinora =

Scientific classification
- Kingdom: Animalia
- Phylum: Arthropoda
- Clade: Pancrustacea
- Class: Insecta
- Order: Lepidoptera
- Family: Gelechiidae
- Subfamily: Gelechiinae
- Genus: Anthinora; Meyrick, 1914
- Species: A. xanthophanes

Binomial name
- Anthinora xanthophanes Meyrick, 1914

Genus of moths

Anthinora is a genus of moth in the family Gelechiidae. It contains the species Anthinora xanthophanes, which is found in Guyana.

The wingspan is 9–10 mm. The forewings are orange-yellow with leaden-metallic markings irrorated (speckled) with blackish. There is a median longitudinal streak from the base to one-third and an oblique streak from the middle of the dorsum to the disc above the middle, as well as spots beneath the costa before the middle and at three-fifths. The second discal stigma is represented by an oblique transverse mark in the disc at three-fourths and there is a group of scattered scales on the tornus. A slender streak is found from beyond the second discal stigma to the costa before the apex and there are some scales along the termen. The hindwings in males are subhyaline (almost glassy) and pale greyish, in females rather dark grey.
