= Sclerocecis =

Scientific classification
- Domain: Eukaryota
- Kingdom: Animalia
- Phylum: Arthropoda
- Class: Insecta
- Order: Lepidoptera
- Family: Gelechiidae
- Subfamily: Gelechiinae
- Genus: Sclerocecis; Chrétien, 1908
- Species: S. pulverosella

Binomial name
- Sclerocecis pulverosella Chrétien, 1908

Genus of moths

Sclerocecis is a genus of moth in the family Gelechiidae. It contains the species Sclerocecis pulverosella, which is found in Algeria.

The wingspan is about 11 mm.

The larvae feed on Limoniastrum guyonanum.
