= Pithanurga =

Scientific classification
- Domain: Eukaryota
- Kingdom: Animalia
- Phylum: Arthropoda
- Class: Insecta
- Order: Lepidoptera
- Family: Gelechiidae
- Subfamily: Gelechiinae
- Genus: Pithanurga; Meyrick, 1921
- Species: P. chariphila

Binomial name
- Pithanurga chariphila Meyrick, 1921

Genus of moths

Pithanurga is monotypic moth genus in the family Gelechiidae. Its only species, Pithanurga chariphila, is found in South Africa. Both the genus and species were first described by Edward Meyrick in 1921.

The wingspan is about 9 mm. The forewings are white, slightly sprinkled with pale grey. The markings are formed by grey suffusion speckled with blackish. There is an elongate spot along the basal fifth of the costa and a semioval blotch along the dorsum before the middle, as well as a triangular blotch extending over the median third of the costa and reaching two-thirds of the way across the wing, its discal portion is occupied by an oblique-oblong light yellow-ochreous spot. The apical fourth is suffusedly irrorated (sprinkled) with grey, preceded on the tornus by an undefined small pale yellow-ochreous spot with some black scales. The hindwings are pale grey.
