= Rotundivalva =

Scientific classification
- Domain: Eukaryota
- Kingdom: Animalia
- Phylum: Arthropoda
- Class: Insecta
- Order: Lepidoptera
- Family: Gelechiidae
- Subfamily: Gelechiinae
- Genus: Rotundivalva; Janse, 1951
- Species: R. blanda

Binomial name
- Rotundivalva blanda Janse, 1951

Synonyms
- Apatetris blanda

Genus of moths

Rotundivalva is a genus of moth in the family Gelechiidae. It contains the species Rotundivalva blanda, which is found in South Africa.
