= Chlorolychnis =

Scientific classification
- Kingdom: Animalia
- Phylum: Arthropoda
- Class: Insecta
- Order: Lepidoptera
- Family: Gelechiidae
- Subfamily: Gelechiinae
- Genus: Chlorolychnis; Meyrick, 1925
- Species: C. agnatella

Binomial name
- Chlorolychnis agnatella (Walker, 1864)

Synonyms
- Gelechia agnatella Walker, 1864

Genus of moths

Chlorolychnis is a genus of moths in the family Gelechiidae. It contains the species Chlorolychnis agnatella, which is found in Indonesia (Java) and Sri Lanka.

Adults are cinereous-brown, the forewings with many oblique parallel darker lines and with the marginal space speckled, without lines. The exterior border is convex and slightly oblique. The hindwings are cinereous.
