= Apotistatus =

Scientific classification
- Domain: Eukaryota
- Kingdom: Animalia
- Phylum: Arthropoda
- Class: Insecta
- Order: Lepidoptera
- Family: Gelechiidae
- Subfamily: Gelechiinae
- Genus: Apotistatus; Walsingham, 1904
- Species: A. leucostictus

Binomial name
- Apotistatus leucostictus Walsingham, 1904

Genus of moths

Apotistatus is a genus of moth in the family Gelechiidae. It contains the species Apotistatus leucostictus, which is found in Algeria.

The wingspan is 10–12 mm.
