= Eripnura =

Scientific classification
- Kingdom: Animalia
- Phylum: Arthropoda
- Clade: Pancrustacea
- Class: Insecta
- Order: Lepidoptera
- Family: Gelechiidae
- Subfamily: Gelechiinae
- Genus: Eripnura; Meyrick, 1914
- Species: E. criodes

Binomial name
- Eripnura criodes Meyrick, 1914

Genus of moths

Eripnura is a genus of moths in the family Gelechiidae. It contains the species Eripnura criodes, which is found in Guyana.

The wingspan is about 13 mm. The forewings are dark purplish-fuscous or ashy-fuscous, sometimes slightly whitish sprinkled. There is an elongate brown patch towards the apex, reaching the costa above the apex, terminated beneath this by a pale leaden-metallic apical spot edged with a black mark anteriorly and suffusedly extended along the upper part of the termen, preceded by a few whitish scales. There is a fine series of white scales just below the costa from four-fifths to the black mark. The hindwings are dark fuscous.
