= Amphigenes =

Scientific classification
- Kingdom: Animalia
- Phylum: Arthropoda
- Clade: Pancrustacea
- Class: Insecta
- Order: Lepidoptera
- Family: Gelechiidae
- Subfamily: Gelechiinae
- Genus: Gelechiinae; Meyrick, 1921
- Species: A. tartarea

Binomial name
- Amphigenes tartarea Meyrick, 1921

Genus of moths

Amphigenes is a genus of moth in the family Gelechiidae. It contains the species Amphigenes tartarea, which is found in New Guinea.

The wingspan is about 21 mm. The forewings are dark purple-fuscous. The hindwings are blackish.
