= Concubina =

Scientific classification
- Kingdom: Animalia
- Phylum: Arthropoda
- Class: Insecta
- Order: Lepidoptera
- Family: Gelechiidae
- Subfamily: Gelechiinae
- Tribe: Litini
- Genus: Concubina; Omelko & Omelko, 2004
- Species: C. euryzeucta

Binomial name
- Concubina euryzeucta (Meyrick, 1922)

Synonyms
- Telphusa euryzeucta Meyrick, 1922; Concubina subita Omelko & Omelko, 2004

Genus of moths

Concubina is a genus of moths in the family Gelechiidae. It contains only one species, Concubina euryzeucta, which is found in China (Shanghai, Beijing, Tianjin, Hebei, Shanxi, Shandong, Gansu, Qinghai, Shaanxi, Hunan, Jiangxi) and the Russian Far East.

The wingspan is about 15 mm. The forewings are ochreous-white with a broad oblique blackish fascia from the base of the costa to one-third of the dorsum. There is a trapezoidal blackish blotch extending on the costa from before the middle to three-fourths and reaching half across the wing and there is some slight greyish suffusion at the apex. The hindwings are grey, suffused white towards base.
