= Coydalla =

Scientific classification
- Kingdom: Animalia
- Phylum: Arthropoda
- Class: Insecta
- Order: Lepidoptera
- Family: Gelechiidae
- Subfamily: Gelechiinae
- Genus: Coydalla; Walker, 1864
- Species: C. interguttella

Binomial name
- Coydalla interguttella Walker, 1864

Genus of moths

Coydalla is a genus of moths in the family Gelechiidae. It contains the species Coydalla interguttella, which is found in Borneo, Indonesia.

Adults are brownish cinereous, the forewings with two aeneous-brown bands, the second slightly abbreviated at each end, except towards its outer border. The intermediate space is purplish tinged, including an aeneous-brown cinereous-bordered dot. The marginal line is black, continued along the apical part of the costa. The hindwings are aeneous.
