= Panicotricha =

Scientific classification
- Domain: Eukaryota
- Kingdom: Animalia
- Phylum: Arthropoda
- Class: Insecta
- Order: Lepidoptera
- Family: Gelechiidae
- Subfamily: Gelechiinae
- Genus: Panicotricha; Meyrick, 1913
- Species: P. prographa

Binomial name
- Panicotricha prographa Meyrick, 1913

Genus of moths

Panicotricha is a monotypic moth genus in the family Gelechiidae. Its only species, Panicotricha prographa, is found in South Africa. Both the genus and species were first described by Edward Meyrick in 1913.

The wingspan is about 15 mm. The forewings are whitish ochreous. The discal stigmata are small, black and found at one-third and two-thirds. The posterior half of the costa has four small slight, very oblique ochreous-yellowish marks, the last two accompanied with a few black specks. The hindwings are pale grey, the apex and upper part of the terminal edge whitish ochreous.
