= Allotelphusa =

Scientific classification
- Kingdom: Animalia
- Phylum: Arthropoda
- Class: Insecta
- Order: Lepidoptera
- Family: Gelechiidae
- Subfamily: Gelechiinae
- Genus: Allotelphusa; Janse, 1958
- Species: A. lathridia

Binomial name
- Allotelphusa lathridia (Meyrick, 1909)

Synonyms
- Telphusa lathridia Meyrick, 1909

Genus of moths

Allotelphusa is a monotypic moth genus in the family Gelechiidae erected by Anthonie Johannes Theodorus Janse in 1958. Its only species, Allotelphusa lathridia, was first described by Edward Meyrick in 1909. It is found in Gauteng, South Africa.

The wingspan is 14–16 mm. The forewings are dark fuscous, the tips of the scales finely whitish, more or less sprinkled with blackish. There is a more or less marked irregular oblique transverse blackish streak about one-fourth, in the male obsolete, in females sometimes posteriorly edged with whitish-ochreous suffusion on the upper half, towards the dorsum forming an irregular ridge of raised scales. The stigmata are raised, blackish, in females more or less edged with pale brownish ochreous, the plical beneath the first discal, an additional dot beneath the second discal. The hindwings are grey, paler towards the base, especially in males.
