= Stachyostoma =

Scientific classification
- Kingdom: Animalia
- Phylum: Arthropoda
- Class: Insecta
- Order: Lepidoptera
- Family: Gelechiidae
- Subfamily: Gelechiinae
- Genus: Stachyostoma; Meyrick, 1923
- Species: S. psilodoxa

Binomial name
- Stachyostoma psilodoxa Meyrick, 1923

Genus of moths

Stachyostoma is a genus of moth in the family Gelechiidae. It contains the species Stachyostoma psilodoxa, which is found in Ecuador.

The wingspan is about 23 mm. The forewings are pale ochreous, on the dorsal three-fifths brownish-tinged, and with scattered dark fuscous specks. There is a blackish dot towards the costa near the base. The discal stigmata are small and dark fuscous, the first with a similar dot obliquely before and above it connected by a fuscous cloud, and with a more conspicuous blackish dot obliquely above and beyond it. The hindwings are whitish-ochreous.
