= Crypsimaga =

Scientific classification
- Kingdom: Animalia
- Phylum: Arthropoda
- Class: Insecta
- Order: Lepidoptera
- Family: Gelechiidae
- Subfamily: Gelechiinae
- Genus: Crypsimaga; Meyrick, 1931
- Species: C. cyanosceptra

Binomial name
- Crypsimaga cyanosceptra Meyrick, 1931

Genus of moths

Crypsimaga is a genus of moths in the family Gelechiidae. It contains the species Crypsimaga cyanosceptra, which is found in New Guinea.
