= Angustiphylla =

Scientific classification
- Kingdom: Animalia
- Phylum: Arthropoda
- Class: Insecta
- Order: Lepidoptera
- Family: Gelechiidae
- Subfamily: Gelechiinae
- Genus: Angustiphylla; Janse, 1960
- Species: A. hylotropha

Binomial name
- Angustiphylla hylotropha Janse, 1960

Genus of moths

Angustiphylla is a genus of moth in the family Gelechiidae. It contains the species Angustiphylla hylotropha, which is found in South Africa.
