= Anastreblotis =

Scientific classification
- Kingdom: Animalia
- Phylum: Arthropoda
- Class: Insecta
- Order: Lepidoptera
- Family: Gelechiidae
- Subfamily: Gelechiinae
- Genus: Anastreblotis; Meyrick, 1927
- Species: A. calycopa

Binomial name
- Anastreblotis calycopa Meyrick, 1927

Genus of moths

Anastreblotis is a genus of moth in the family Gelechiidae. It contains the species Anastreblotis calycopa, which is found on Samoa.
