= Clistothyris =

Scientific classification
- Kingdom: Animalia
- Phylum: Arthropoda
- Clade: Pancrustacea
- Class: Insecta
- Order: Lepidoptera
- Family: Gelechiidae
- Subfamily: Gelechiinae
- Genus: Clistothyris; Zeller, 1877
- Species: C. villosula

Binomial name
- Clistothyris villosula Zeller, 1877

Genus of moths

Clistothyris is a genus of moths in the family Gelechiidae. It contains the species Clistothyris villosula, which is found in Colombia.
