= Sterrhostoma =

Scientific classification
- Domain: Eukaryota
- Kingdom: Animalia
- Phylum: Arthropoda
- Class: Insecta
- Order: Lepidoptera
- Family: Gelechiidae
- Subfamily: Gelechiinae
- Genus: Sterrhostoma; Meyrick, 1935
- Species: S. heterogastra

Binomial name
- Sterrhostoma heterogastra Meyrick, 1935

Genus of moths

Sterrhostoma is a genus of moth in the family Gelechiidae. It contains the species Sterrhostoma heterogastra, which is found in Indonesia (Java).

The larvae feed on the leaves of Limonia acidissima.
