= Aregha =

Scientific classification
- Kingdom: Animalia
- Phylum: Arthropoda
- Clade: Pancrustacea
- Class: Insecta
- Order: Lepidoptera
- Family: Gelechiidae
- Subfamily: Gelechiinae
- Genus: Aregha; Chrétien, 1915
- Species: A. abhaustella

Binomial name
- Aregha abhaustella Chrétien, 1915

Genus of moths

Aregha is a genus of moths in the family Gelechiidae. It contains the species Aregha abhaustella, which is found in Algeria.
