= Spermanthrax =

Scientific classification
- Domain: Eukaryota
- Kingdom: Animalia
- Phylum: Arthropoda
- Class: Insecta
- Order: Lepidoptera
- Family: Gelechiidae
- Subfamily: Gelechiinae
- Genus: Spermanthrax; Meyrick, 1936
- Species: S. pycnostoma

Binomial name
- Spermanthrax pycnostoma Meyrick, 1936

Genus of moths

Spermanthrax is a genus of moth in the family Gelechiidae. It contains the species Spermanthrax pycnostoma, which is found in Algeria.
