= Eristhenodes =

Scientific classification
- Kingdom: Animalia
- Phylum: Arthropoda
- Clade: Pancrustacea
- Class: Insecta
- Order: Lepidoptera
- Family: Gelechiidae
- Subfamily: Gelechiinae
- Genus: Eristhenodes; Meyrick, 1935
- Species: E. tetrapetra

Binomial name
- Eristhenodes tetrapetra Meyrick, 1935

Genus of moths

Eristhenodes is a genus of moths in the family Gelechiidae. It contains the species Eristhenodes tetrapetra, which is found in Argentina.
