= Stereodmeta =

Scientific classification
- Domain: Eukaryota
- Kingdom: Animalia
- Phylum: Arthropoda
- Class: Insecta
- Order: Lepidoptera
- Family: Gelechiidae
- Subfamily: Gelechiinae
- Genus: Stereodmeta; Meyrick 1931
- Species: S. xylodeta

Binomial name
- Stereodmeta xylodeta Meyrick, 1931

Genus of moths

Stereodmeta is a genus of moth in the family Gelechiidae. It contains the species Stereodmeta xylodeta, which is found in Brazil.
