= Angustialata =

Scientific classification
- Domain: Eukaryota
- Kingdom: Animalia
- Phylum: Arthropoda
- Class: Insecta
- Order: Lepidoptera
- Family: Gelechiidae
- Subfamily: Gelechiinae
- Tribe: Litini
- Genus: Angustialata; Omelko, 1988
- Species: A. gemmellaformis

Binomial name
- Angustialata gemmellaformis Omelko, 1988

Genus of moths

Angustialata is a genus of moths in the family Gelechiidae. It contains the only species Angustialata gemmellaformis, which is found in Korea, China, the Russian Far East and Japan.
