= Euchionodes =

Scientific classification
- Domain: Eukaryota
- Kingdom: Animalia
- Phylum: Arthropoda
- Class: Insecta
- Order: Lepidoptera
- Family: Gelechiidae
- Subfamily: Gelechiinae
- Genus: Euchionodes; Clarke, 1950
- Species: E. traditionis

Binomial name
- Euchionodes traditionis Clarke, 1950

Genus of moths

Euchionodes is a genus of moths in the family Gelechiidae. It contains the species Euchionodes traditionis, which is found in Argentina.
