= Colonanthes =

Scientific classification
- Kingdom: Animalia
- Phylum: Arthropoda
- Class: Insecta
- Order: Lepidoptera
- Family: Gelechiidae
- Subfamily: Gelechiinae
- Genus: Colonanthes; Meyrick, 1923
- Species: C. plectanopa

Binomial name
- Colonanthes plectanopa Meyrick, 1923

Genus of moths

Colonanthes is a genus of moths in the family Gelechiidae. It contains the species Colonanthes plectanopa, which is found in Brazil (Amazonas) and Peru.

The wingspan is about 9 millimetres (0.35 in). The forewings are brownish suffused or irrorated (speckled) grey, with minute whitish speckling and two white strigulae from the costa near the base and at one-fifth converging to a median basal tuft. There is an oblique white strigulae from the costa at one-fifth, before the middle, and at three-fourths, preceded by suffused brown blotches, the first running to two large tufts somewhat obliquely placed in the disc. The discal stigmata are black finely ringed whitish, connected by a patch of brown suffusion, beneath first a grey subdorsal tuft, beneath and touching the second a large dark grey dorsal tuft edged anteriorly by an oblique white strigula. There is a suffused dark fuscous dash in the disc posteriorly and some minute blackish white-edged dots on the costa posteriorly and the termen. The hindwings are dark grey, lighter in the disc.
