= Agathactis =

Scientific classification
- Kingdom: Animalia
- Phylum: Arthropoda
- Class: Insecta
- Order: Lepidoptera
- Family: Gelechiidae
- Subfamily: Gelechiinae
- Genus: Agathactis; Meyrick, 1929
- Species: A. toxocosma

Binomial name
- Agathactis toxocosma Meyrick, 1929

Genus of moths

Agathactis is a genus of moths in the family Gelechiidae. It contains the species Agathactis toxocosma, which is found in Guyana.

The wingspan is 8–9 mm.
