= Adelomorpha =

Scientific classification
- Kingdom: Animalia
- Phylum: Arthropoda
- Clade: Pancrustacea
- Class: Insecta
- Order: Lepidoptera
- Family: Gelechiidae
- Subfamily: Gelechiinae
- Genus: Adelomorpha; Snellen, 1885
- Species: A. ritsemae

Binomial name
- Adelomorpha ritsemae Snellen, 1885

Genus of moths

Adelomorpha is a genus of moths in the family Gelechiidae. It contains the species Adelomorpha ritsemae, which is found on Sulawesi, an island in Indonesia.

The wingspan is 24–26 mm. The forewings are dull ash-grey with a dot at the margin and a curved crossband. There are ochreous yellow markings on the hindwings.
