= Apothetoeca =

Scientific classification
- Kingdom: Animalia
- Phylum: Arthropoda
- Class: Insecta
- Order: Lepidoptera
- Family: Gelechiidae
- Subfamily: Gelechiinae
- Genus: Apothetoeca; Meyrick, 1922
- Species: A. synaphrista

Binomial name
- Apothetoeca synaphrista Meyrick, 1922

Genus of moths

Apothetoeca is a genus of moth in the family Gelechiidae. It contains the species Apothetoeca synaphrista, which is found on the Galapagos Islands.
