= Araeophalla =

Scientific classification
- Domain: Eukaryota
- Kingdom: Animalia
- Phylum: Arthropoda
- Class: Insecta
- Order: Lepidoptera
- Family: Gelechiidae
- Subfamily: Gelechiinae
- Genus: Araeophalla; Janse, 1960
- Species: A. barbertonensis

Binomial name
- Araeophalla barbertonensis Janse, 1960

Genus of moths

Araeophalla is a genus of moth in the family Gelechiidae. It contains the species Araeophalla barbertonensis, which is found in South Africa.
