= Smenodoca =

Scientific classification
- Domain: Eukaryota
- Kingdom: Animalia
- Phylum: Arthropoda
- Class: Insecta
- Order: Lepidoptera
- Family: Gelechiidae
- Tribe: Gelechiini
- Genus: Smenodoca; Meyrick, 1904
- Species: S. erebenna

Binomial name
- Smenodoca erebenna Meyrick, 1904

Genus of moths

Smenodoca is a genus of moth in the family Gelechiidae. It contains only one species, Smenodoca erebenna, which is found in Australia, where it has been recorded from New South Wales, Victoria and Western Australia.

The wingspan is 9–11 mm (0.35–0.43 in). The forewings are white, coarsely irrorated with dark fuscous and with a more or less developed variably interrupted black streak from the base of the costa through the disc to the apex, and a less marked also interrupted streak along the fold. Sometimes a white streak between these, or a white longitudinal mark in the disc beyond the middle, or white opposite tornal and costal spots. Sometimes, the stigmata are traceable as part of black streaks, elongate, the plical beyond the first discal. The hindwings are fuscous darker posteriorly.
