= Sphenogrypa =

Scientific classification
- Domain: Eukaryota
- Kingdom: Animalia
- Phylum: Arthropoda
- Class: Insecta
- Order: Lepidoptera
- Family: Gelechiidae
- Subfamily: Gelechiinae
- Genus: Sphenogrypa; Meyrick, 1920
- Species: S. syncosma

Binomial name
- Sphenogrypa syncosma Meyrick, 1920

Genus of moths

Sphenogrypa is a genus of moth in the family Gelechiidae. It contains the species Sphenogrypa syncosma, which is found in Kenya.
