= Allophlebia =

Scientific classification
- Domain: Eukaryota
- Kingdom: Animalia
- Phylum: Arthropoda
- Class: Insecta
- Order: Lepidoptera
- Family: Gelechiidae
- Subfamily: Gelechiinae
- Genus: Allophlebia; Janse, 1960
- Species: A. hemizancla

Binomial name
- Allophlebia hemizancla Janse, 1960

Genus of moths

Allophlebia is a genus of moth in the family Gelechiidae. It contains the species Allophlebia hemizancla, which is found in South Africa.
