= Piskunovia =

Scientific classification
- Kingdom: Animalia
- Phylum: Arthropoda
- Class: Insecta
- Order: Lepidoptera
- Family: Gelechiidae
- Subfamily: Gelechiinae
- Tribe: Litini
- Genus: Piskunovia; Omelko, 1988
- Species: P. reductionis

Binomial name
- Piskunovia reductionis Omelko, 1988

Genus of moths

Piskunovia is a genus of moth in the family Gelechiidae. It contains the species Piskunovia reductionis, which is found in Japan and the Russian Far East.
