= Proadamas =

Scientific classification
- Domain: Eukaryota
- Kingdom: Animalia
- Phylum: Arthropoda
- Class: Insecta
- Order: Lepidoptera
- Family: Gelechiidae
- Subfamily: Gelechiinae
- Genus: Proadamas; Meyrick, 1929
- Species: P. indefessa

Binomial name
- Proadamas indefessa Meyrick, 1929

Genus of moths

Proadamas is a genus of moth in the family Gelechiidae. It contains the species Proadamas indefessa, which is found in Sri Lanka.

The wingspan is about 11 mm.
