= Scrobitasta =

Scientific classification
- Kingdom: Animalia
- Phylum: Arthropoda
- Clade: Pancrustacea
- Class: Insecta
- Order: Lepidoptera
- Family: Gelechiidae
- Subfamily: Gelechiinae
- Tribe: Gnorimoschemini
- Genus: Scrobitasta; Povolný, 1985
- Species: S. varians

Binomial name
- Scrobitasta varians Povolný, 1985

Genus of moths

Scrobitasta is a genus of moth in the family Gelechiidae. It contains the species Scrobitasta varians, which is found in Argentina.
