= Corynaea dilechria =

Scientific classification
- Domain: Eukaryota
- Kingdom: Animalia
- Phylum: Arthropoda
- Class: Insecta
- Order: Lepidoptera
- Family: Gelechiidae
- Subfamily: Gelechiinae
- Genus: Corynaea; Turner, 1919
- Species: C. dilechria

Binomial name
- Corynaea dilechria Turner, 1919

Genus of moths

Corynaea is a genus of moth in the family Gelechiidae. It contains the species Corynaea dilechria, which is found in Australia, where it has been recorded from northern Queensland.

The wingspan is about 12 mm. The forewings are fuscous with the basal and terminal areas suffused with ochreous-brown. There is a broad, outwardly oblique, ochreous-whitish streak from one-sixth of the costa not reaching the dorsum, broadly edged with dark-fuscous. There is an inwardly oblique, inwardly curved, ochreous-whitish fascia from three-fourths of the costa to the tornus and an interrupted blackish terminal line. The hindwings are grey.
