= Insuloschema =

Scientific classification
- Kingdom: Animalia
- Phylum: Arthropoda
- Clade: Pancrustacea
- Class: Insecta
- Order: Lepidoptera
- Family: Gelechiidae
- Tribe: Gnorimoschemini
- Genus: Insuloschema; Povolný, 2004
- Species: I. barbarae

Binomial name
- Insuloschema barbarae Povolný, 2004

Genus of moths

Insuloschema is a genus of moths in the family Gelechiidae. It contains the species Insuloschema barbarae, which is found in California, United States. The species is endemic to Santa Barbara Island.
