= Phaeotypa =

Scientific classification
- Domain: Eukaryota
- Kingdom: Animalia
- Phylum: Arthropoda
- Class: Insecta
- Order: Lepidoptera
- Family: Gelechiidae
- Subfamily: Gelechiinae
- Genus: Phaeotypa; Turner, 1944
- Species: P. stenochorda

Binomial name
- Phaeotypa stenochorda (Turner, 1933)

Synonyms
- Lophozancla Turner, 1933 (preocc. Turner, 1932); Lophozancla stenochorda Turner, 1933

Genus of moths

Phaeotypa is a genus of moth in the family Gelechiidae. It contains the species Phaeotypa stenochorda, which is found in Australia, where it has been recorded from Queensland.
