= Encentrotis =

Scientific classification
- Kingdom: Animalia
- Phylum: Arthropoda
- Class: Insecta
- Order: Lepidoptera
- Family: Gelechiidae
- Subfamily: Gelechiinae
- Genus: Encentrotis; Meyrick, 1921
- Species: E. catagrapha

Binomial name
- Encentrotis catagrapha Meyrick, 1921

Genus of moths

Encentrotis is a genus of moths in the family Gelechiidae. It contains the species Encentrotis catagrapha, which is found in South Africa.

The wingspan is about 16 mm. The forewings are pale glossy ochreous, with a few fuscous scales and with the base of the costa dark fuscous. There is a rather large dark fuscous dot towards the costa at one-third. The plical and second discal stigmata are rather large and dark fuscous. The hindwings are light grey.
