= Schistovalva =

Scientific classification
- Domain: Eukaryota
- Kingdom: Animalia
- Phylum: Arthropoda
- Class: Insecta
- Order: Lepidoptera
- Family: Gelechiidae
- Subfamily: Gelechiinae
- Genus: Schistovalva; Janse, 1960
- Species: S. trachyptera

Binomial name
- Schistovalva trachyptera Janse, 1960

Genus of moths

Schistovalva is a genus of moths in the family Gelechiidae. It contains the species Schistovalva trachyptera, which is found in Namibia.
