= Prosodarma =

Scientific classification
- Kingdom: Animalia
- Phylum: Arthropoda
- Clade: Pancrustacea
- Class: Insecta
- Order: Lepidoptera
- Family: Gelechiidae
- Subfamily: Gelechiinae
- Genus: Prosodarma; Meyrick, 1925
- Species: P. fibularis

Binomial name
- Prosodarma fibularis (Meyrick, 1921)

Synonyms
- Onebala fibularis Meyrick, 1921

Genus of moths

Prosodarma is a genus of moth in the family Gelechiidae. It contains the species Prosodarma fibularis, which is found in Indonesia (Java, Sulawesi).

The wingspan is 12–14 mm for males and 15–19 mm for females. The forewings are rather dark purplish-fuscous with a narrow-transverse black blotch representing the plical and first discal stigmata, in two examples interrupted to form two spots. The second discal is represented by a brownish-ochreous transverse-oval spot with black dots at both ends. There is a slightly curved whitish-ochreous transverse shade at five-sixths, more or less obscurely indicated, most strongly at the extremities, in females almost obsolete. The hindwings are grey.
