= Phthoracma =

Scientific classification
- Domain: Eukaryota
- Kingdom: Animalia
- Phylum: Arthropoda
- Class: Insecta
- Order: Lepidoptera
- Family: Gelechiidae
- Subfamily: Gelechiinae
- Genus: Phthoracma; Meyrick, 1921
- Species: P. blanda

Binomial name
- Phthoracma blanda Meyrick, 1921

Genus of moths

Phthoracma is a monotypic moth genus in the family Gelechiidae. Its only species, Phthoracma blanda, is found in South Africa. Both the genus and species were first described by Edward Meyrick in 1921.

The wingspan is about 14 mm. The forewings are fuscous suffused with whitish and sprinkled irregularly with dark fuscous. The stigmata are represented by undefined groups of dark fuscous irroration (sprinkles), the plical very obliquely before the first discal, the first discal about the middle of the wing, the second discal at two-thirds, forming a roundish cloudy spot. The hindwings are light grey.
