= Cartericella =

Scientific classification
- Kingdom: Animalia
- Phylum: Arthropoda
- Clade: Pancrustacea
- Class: Insecta
- Order: Lepidoptera
- Family: Gelechiidae
- Subfamily: Gelechiinae
- Genus: Cartericella; T. B. Fletcher, 1940
- Species: C. phthoneropa

Binomial name
- Cartericella phthoneropa (Meyrick, 1917)

Synonyms
- Carterica Meyrick, 1925 (preocc. Thomson, 1860); Homaloxestis phthoneropa Meyrick, 1922

Genus of moths

Cartericella is a monotypic moth genus in the family Gelechiidae described by Thomas Bainbrigge Fletcher in 1940. It contains the species Cartericella phthoneropa, described by Edward Meyrick in 1917, which is found in Shanghai, China.

The wingspan is about 9 mm. The forewings are dark fuscous, the base of the scales whitish. The stigmata are rather large and blackish, the plical and first discal elongate, the plical somewhat anterior and the second discal transverse. There is a small white spot on the costa at three-fourths, and less distinct one on the dorsum rather anterior. The hindwings are grey.
