= Stagmaturgis =

Scientific classification
- Domain: Eukaryota
- Kingdom: Animalia
- Phylum: Arthropoda
- Class: Insecta
- Order: Lepidoptera
- Family: Gelechiidae
- Subfamily: Gelechiinae
- Genus: Stagmaturgis; Meyrick, 1923
- Species: S. catharosema

Binomial name
- Stagmaturgis catharosema Meyrick, 1923

Genus of moths

Stagmaturgis is a genus of moth in the family Gelechiidae. It contains the species Stagmaturgis catharosema, which is found in Brazil (Amazonas).

The wingspan is 9–10 mm. The forewings are blackish-fuscous with a small white spot or mark on the costa beyond the middle. There is also a small white apical spot. The hindwings are dark grey.
