= Platymacha =

Scientific classification
- Domain: Eukaryota
- Kingdom: Animalia
- Phylum: Arthropoda
- Class: Insecta
- Order: Lepidoptera
- Family: Gelechiidae
- Subfamily: Gelechiinae
- Genus: Platymacha; Meyrick, 1933
- Species: P. anthochroa

Binomial name
- Platymacha anthochroa Meyrick, 1933

Genus of moths

Platymacha is a monotypic moth genus in the family Gelechiidae. Its only species, Platymacha anthochroa, is found on New Guinea. Both the genus and species were first described by Edward Meyrick in 1933.
