= Namatetris =

Scientific classification
- Kingdom: Animalia
- Phylum: Arthropoda
- Clade: Pancrustacea
- Class: Insecta
- Order: Lepidoptera
- Family: Gelechiidae
- Subfamily: Gelechiinae
- Genus: Namatetris; Bidzilya & Mey, 2011
- Species: N. rhinoceros

Binomial name
- Namatetris rhinoceros Bidzilya & Mey, 2011

Genus of moths

Namatetris is a genus of moths in the family Gelechiidae. It contains the species Namatetris rhinoceros, which is found in Namibia and South Africa.
