= Excommatica =

Scientific classification
- Kingdom: Animalia
- Phylum: Arthropoda
- Class: Insecta
- Order: Lepidoptera
- Family: Gelechiidae
- Subfamily: Gelechiinae
- Genus: Excommatica; Janse, 1951
- Species: E. compsotoma

Binomial name
- Excommatica compsotoma (Meyrick, 1921)

Synonyms
- Commatica compsotoma Meyrick, 1921

Genus of moths

Excommatica is a monotypic moth genus in the family Gelechiidae erected by Anthonie Johannes Theodorus Janse in 1951. Its only species, Excommatica compsotoma, was first described by Edward Meyrick in 1921. It is found in Mozambique and Zimbabwe.

The wingspan is about 10 mm. The forewings are pale ochreous with an irregular blackish patch extending along the dorsum from near the base to near the tornus, widest before the middle of the wing, where it extends halfway across, the edge is sinuate before and beyond this, narrow towards the posterior extremity, the apex truncate and followed by slight whitish suffusion. There is a broad blackish streak along the costa from before the middle to the apex, pointed anteriorly, cut by an oblique whitish strigula at two-thirds and a less oblique grey-whitish strigula at three-fourths, the lower edge between this and the apex semicircularly excavated. There is also an oval silvery-white spot on the middle of the termen containing an elongate black dot. The hindwings are grey, lighter and bluish tinged anteriorly.
