= Phobetica =

Scientific classification
- Domain: Eukaryota
- Kingdom: Animalia
- Phylum: Arthropoda
- Class: Insecta
- Order: Lepidoptera
- Family: Gelechiidae
- Tribe: Gnorimoschemini
- Genus: Phobetica; Turner, 1944
- Species: P. ignobilis

Binomial name
- Phobetica ignobilis (Turner, 1939)

Synonyms
- Idiozancla Turner, 1939 (preocc. Turner, 1936); Idiozancla ignobilis Turner, 1939

Genus of moths

Phobetica is a genus of moth in the family Gelechiidae. It contains the single species Phobetica ignobilis, which is found in Australia, where it has been recorded from Tasmania.
