= Coconympha =

Scientific classification
- Kingdom: Animalia
- Phylum: Arthropoda
- Class: Insecta
- Order: Lepidoptera
- Family: Gelechiidae
- Subfamily: Gelechiinae
- Genus: Coconympha; Meyrick, 1931
- Species: C. iriarcha

Binomial name
- Coconympha iriarcha Meyrick, 1931

Genus of moths

Coconympha is a genus of moth in the family Gelechiidae. It contains the species Coconympha iriarcha, which is found in south-western India.

The larvae feed on the leaves of Cocos nucifera.
