= Afrotelphusa =

Scientific classification
- Kingdom: Animalia
- Phylum: Arthropoda
- Clade: Pancrustacea
- Class: Insecta
- Order: Lepidoptera
- Family: Gelechiidae
- Subfamily: Gelechiinae
- Genus: Afrotelphusa; Bidzilya & Mey, 2011
- Species: A. accensa

Binomial name
- Afrotelphusa accensa (Meyrick, 1921)

Synonyms
- Telphusa accensa Meyrick, 1921

Genus of moths

Afrotelphusa is a genus of moths in the family Gelechiidae erected by Oleksiy Vasyliovych Bidzilya and Wolfram Mey in 2011. Its only species, Afrotelphusa accensa, was first described by Edward Meyrick in 1921. It is found in Namibia, South Africa and Zimbabwe.

The wingspan is about 15 mm. The forewings are grey irregularly mixed with dark grey and with an oblong dark grey patch extending along the dorsum from near the base to the tornus and reaching three-fifths across the wing, anteriorly edged by raised scales, above by a streak of brownish suffusion, posteriorly by an angulated shade of brownish suffusion from three-fourths of the costa to the tornus. The stigmata are blackish followed by tufts of scales, the plical obliquely before the first discal, the first discal represented by a transverse mark crossing the upper edge of the dorsal patch, the second by two transversely placed dots and a transverse ridge-tuft, some other small tufts of scales in the disc. There is a spot of brownish suffusion on the costa beyond the middle reaching a longitudinal streak. There is a marginal series of suffused brownish spots around the posterior part of the costa and termen. The hindwings are grey, paler and thinly scaled in the disc towards the base, and with the veins somewhat darker suffused.
