= Argophara =

Scientific classification
- Kingdom: Animalia
- Phylum: Arthropoda
- Clade: Pancrustacea
- Class: Insecta
- Order: Lepidoptera
- Family: Gelechiidae
- Subfamily: Gelechiinae
- Genus: Argophara; Janse, 1963
- Species: A. epaxia

Binomial name
- Argophara epaxia Janse, 1963

Genus of moths

Argophara is a genus of moth in the family Gelechiidae. It contains the species Argophara epaxia, which is found in Namibia.
