= Syngelechia =

Scientific classification
- Kingdom: Animalia
- Phylum: Arthropoda
- Class: Insecta
- Order: Lepidoptera
- Family: Gelechiidae
- Subfamily: Gelechiinae
- Genus: Syngelechia; Janse, 1958
- Species: S. psimythota

Binomial name
- Syngelechia psimythota (Meyrick, 1913)

Synonyms
- Gelechia psimythota Meyrick, 1913; Telphusa emphanista Meyrick, 1921

Genus of moths

Syngelechia is a genus of moths in the family Gelechiidae erected by Anthonie Johannes Theodorus Janse in 1958. Its only species, Syngelechia psimythota, was first described by Edward Meyrick in 1913. It is found in South Africa.

The wingspan is about 15 mm. The forewings are ochreous white with a black dot almost at the base of the fold. There is a narrow oblique irregular dark fuscous fascia towards the base, extended along the costa to the base, the anterior edge suffused. There is a semi-oval dark fuscous spot on the costa towards the middle and there is a narrower semi-oval dark fuscous spot on the costa at about two-thirds. The second discal stigma is transverse linear, dark fuscous. A tornal patch of dark fuscous suffusion is found beneath this where a suffused dark fuscous streak runs along the termen to the apex. The hindwings are whitish grey.
