= Neolechia =

Scientific classification
- Domain: Eukaryota
- Kingdom: Animalia
- Phylum: Arthropoda
- Class: Insecta
- Order: Lepidoptera
- Family: Gelechiidae
- Subfamily: Gelechiinae
- Genus: Neolechia; Diakonoff, 1948
- Species: N. gamma

Binomial name
- Neolechia gamma Diakonoff, 1948

Genus of moths

Neolechia is a genus of moths in the family Gelechiidae. It contains the species Neolechia gamma, which is found in New Guinea.
