= Steremniodes =

Scientific classification
- Domain: Eukaryota
- Kingdom: Animalia
- Phylum: Arthropoda
- Class: Insecta
- Order: Lepidoptera
- Family: Gelechiidae
- Subfamily: Gelechiinae
- Genus: Steremniodes; Meyrick, 1923
- Species: S. sciactis

Binomial name
- Steremniodes sciactis Meyrick, 1923

Genus of moths

Steremniodes is a genus of moth in the family Gelechiidae. It contains the species Steremniodes sciactis, which is found in French Guiana and Brazil (Amazonas).

The wingspan is about 16 mm. The forewings are fuscous, irregularly irrorated dark fuscous tending to form suffused dark fuscous streaks between the veins and along the fold, the costal area suffused dark fuscous. There are small dark fuscous marginal dots around the apex and termen. The hindwings are grey speckled darker.
