= Argyrolacia =

Scientific classification
- Kingdom: Animalia
- Phylum: Arthropoda
- Class: Insecta
- Order: Lepidoptera
- Family: Gelechiidae
- Subfamily: Gelechiinae
- Tribe: Litini
- Genus: Argyrolacia; Keifer, 1936
- Species: A. bifida

Binomial name
- Argyrolacia bifida Keifer, 1936

Genus of moths

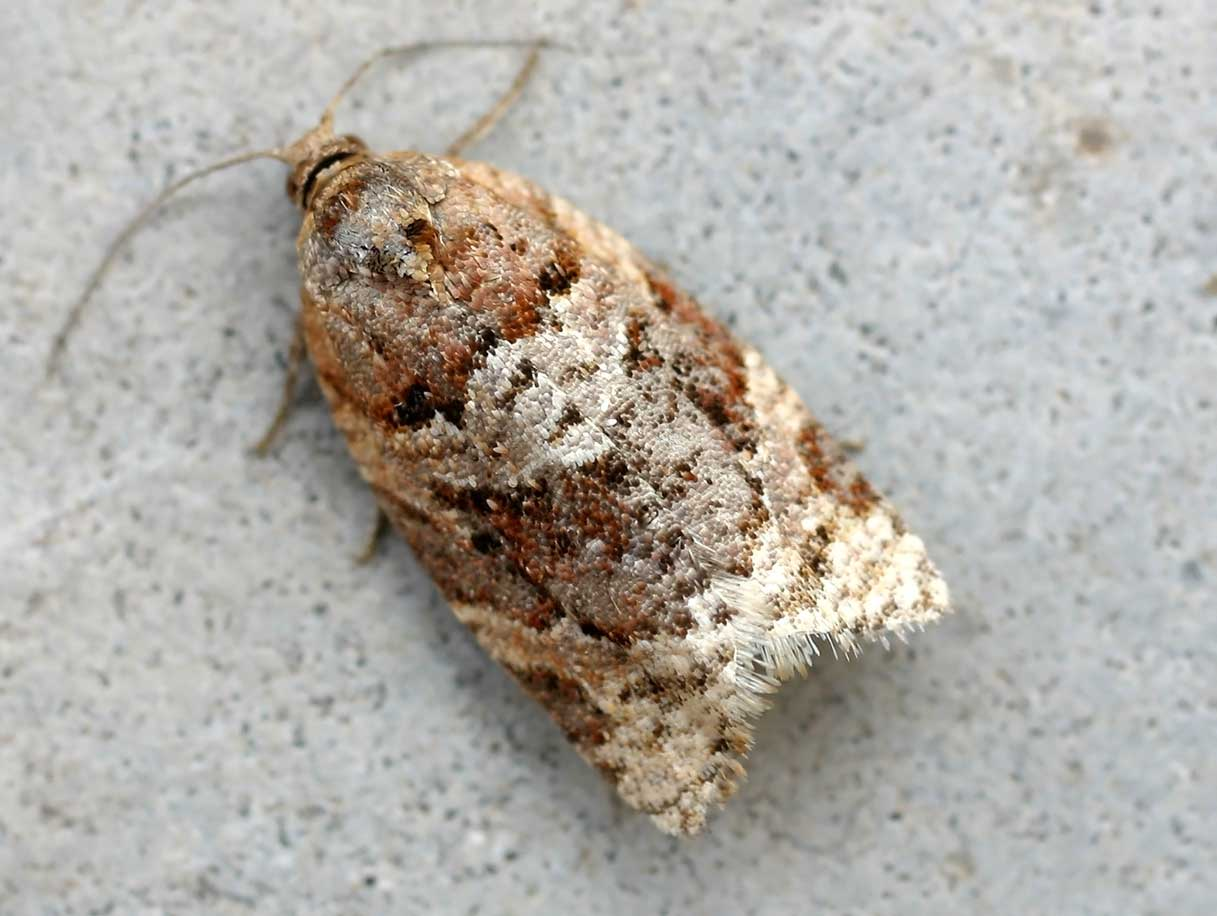
Top view of agyrotaenia ijungiana

Argyrolacia is a genus of moth in the family Gelechiidae. It contains only one species, Argyrolacia bifida, which is found in western North America, with records from California and Arizona.

The forewing length is 6 mm. The larvae feed on Ceanothus, likely Ceanothus divaricatus (Rhamnaceae).
