= Proteodoxa =

Scientific classification
- Domain: Eukaryota
- Kingdom: Animalia
- Phylum: Arthropoda
- Class: Insecta
- Order: Lepidoptera
- Family: Gelechiidae
- Subfamily: Gelechiinae
- Genus: Proteodoxa; Meyrick, 1938
- Species: P. cirrhopa

Binomial name
- Proteodoxa cirrhopa Meyrick, 1938

Genus of moths

Proteodoxa is a genus of moth in the family Gelechiidae. It contains the species Proteodoxa cirrhopa, which is found in the Democratic Republic of Congo (North Kivu, Orientale).
