= Satrapodoxa =

Scientific classification
- Domain: Eukaryota
- Kingdom: Animalia
- Phylum: Arthropoda
- Class: Insecta
- Order: Lepidoptera
- Family: Gelechiidae
- Subfamily: Gelechiinae
- Genus: Satrapodoxa; Meyrick, 1925
- Species: S. regia

Binomial name
- Satrapodoxa regia (Meyrick, 1914)

Synonyms
- Strobisia regia Meyrick, 1914

Genus of moths

Satrapodoxa is a genus of moth in the family Gelechiidae. It contains the species Satrapodoxa regia, which is found in Guyana.

The wingspan is 9–10 mm. The forewings are black with a subdorsal streak of orange suffusion from the base to near the tornus and three pale blue-metallic streaks, the first from the base of the costa along the submedian fold to one-fourth, the second from the costa at one-fourth to just beyond the apex of the first and the third from the middle of the costa nearly to the middle of the dorsum, somewhat curved outwards. There is a postmedian transverse orange fascia, the lower half enclosing a somewhat oblique pale golden-metallic streak. There is also a golden-metallic spot or mark on the costa beyond this and a curved violet-metallic pre-marginal streak along the termen. The hindwings are dark fuscous.
