= Sicera =

Scientific classification
- Kingdom: Animalia
- Phylum: Arthropoda
- Clade: Pancrustacea
- Class: Insecta
- Order: Lepidoptera
- Family: Gelechiidae
- Subfamily: Gelechiinae
- Genus: Sicera; Chrétien, 1908
- Species: S. albidella

Binomial name
- Sicera albidella Chrétien, 1908

Genus of moths

Sicera is a genus of moth in the family Gelechiidae. It contains the species Sicera albidella, which is found in Algeria.
