= Phricogenes =

Scientific classification
- Kingdom: Animalia
- Phylum: Arthropoda
- Class: Insecta
- Order: Lepidoptera
- Family: Gelechiidae
- Tribe: Gnorimoschemini
- Genus: Phricogenes; Meyrick, 1931
- Species: P. sophronopa

Binomial name
- Phricogenes sophronopa Meyrick, 1931

Genus of moths

Phricogenes is a genus of moths in the family Gelechiidae. It contains the single species Phricogenes sophronopa, which is found in New Guinea.
