= Synactias =

Scientific classification
- Kingdom: Animalia
- Phylum: Arthropoda
- Class: Insecta
- Order: Lepidoptera
- Family: Gelechiidae
- Subfamily: Gelechiinae
- Genus: Synactias; Meyrick, 1931
- Species: S. micranthis

Binomial name
- Synactias micranthis Meyrick, 1931

Genus of moths

Synactias is a genus of moth in the family Gelechiidae. It contains the species Synactias micranthis, which is found in Brazil.
