= Orphanoclera =

Scientific classification
- Domain: Eukaryota
- Kingdom: Animalia
- Phylum: Arthropoda
- Class: Insecta
- Order: Lepidoptera
- Family: Gelechiidae
- Subfamily: Gelechiinae
- Genus: Orphanoclera; Meyrick, 1925
- Species: O. tyriocoma

Binomial name
- Orphanoclera tyriocoma Meyrick, 1925

Genus of moths

Orphanoclera is a genus of moth in the family Gelechiidae. It contains the species Orphanoclera tyriocoma, which is found in Indonesia (Java).
