= Anomoxena =

Scientific classification
- Kingdom: Animalia
- Phylum: Arthropoda
- Class: Insecta
- Order: Lepidoptera
- Family: Gelechiidae
- Subfamily: Gelechiinae
- Genus: Anomoxena; Meyrick, 1917
- Species: A. spinigera

Binomial name
- Anomoxena spinigera Meyrick, 1917

Synonyms
- Anomoxena tetraxoa Meyrick, 1917

Genus of moths

Anomoxena is a genus of moth in the family Gelechiidae. It contains the species Anomoxena spinigera, which is found in Colombia.

The wingspan is 8–10 mm. The forewings are pale ochreous irregularly irrorated (speckled) with blackish and an inwardly oblique slender fascia of blackish suffusion from the costa at three-fifths, not or scarcely reaching the dorsum. The costal area from this to the apex is fulvous, without dark irroration, with four oblique fine wedge-shaped pale ochreous streaks posteriorly edged with black. The hindwings are dark grey.
