= Adullamitis =

Scientific classification
- Kingdom: Animalia
- Phylum: Arthropoda
- Class: Insecta
- Order: Lepidoptera
- Family: Gelechiidae
- Subfamily: Gelechiinae
- Genus: Adullamitis; Meyrick, 1932
- Species: A. emancipata

Binomial name
- Adullamitis emancipata Meyrick, 1932

Genus of moths

Adullamitis is a genus of moth in the family Gelechiidae. It contains the species Adullamitis emancipata, which is found in Brazil.
