= Strenophila =

Scientific classification
- Kingdom: Animalia
- Phylum: Arthropoda
- Class: Insecta
- Order: Lepidoptera
- Family: Gelechiidae
- Subfamily: Gelechiinae
- Genus: Strenophila; Meyrick, 1913
- Species: S. hyptiota

Binomial name
- Strenophila hyptiota Meyrick, 1913

Genus of moths

Strenophila is a monotypic moth genus in the family Gelechiidae. Its only species, Strenophila hyptiota, is found in South Africa. Both the genus and species were first described by Edward Meyrick in 1913.

The wingspan is 13–14 mm. The forewings are ochreous white, with a few scattered brownish and blackish scales. The markings are purple blackish, with an almost basal fascia, on the costa extending to one-fifth, dilated downwards, on the dorsum extending nearly to the middle of the wing. There is a semi-oval patch extending nearly over the median third of the costa and reaching halfway across the wing. The stigmata are black, with the discal nearly approaching the costal patch before and behind, the plical beneath the first discal, forming part of the subbasal fascia. There is an irregular terminal fascia, broadest on the costa and narrowed downwards, extending over the tornus to beneath the middle of the costal patch. The hindwings are grey.
