= Stigmatoptera =

Scientific classification
- Kingdom: Animalia
- Phylum: Arthropoda
- Class: Insecta
- Order: Lepidoptera
- Family: Gelechiidae
- Subfamily: Gelechiinae
- Genus: Stigmatoptera; Hartig, 1936
- Species: S. dumonti

Binomial name
- Stigmatoptera dumonti Hartig, 1936

Synonyms
- Stigmasophronia Hartig, 1936

Genus of moths

Stigmatoptera is a genus of moths in the family Gelechiidae. It contains the species Stigmatoptera dumonti, which is found in Tunisia.
