= Chretienella =

Scientific classification
- Domain: Eukaryota
- Kingdom: Animalia
- Phylum: Arthropoda
- Class: Insecta
- Order: Lepidoptera
- Family: Gelechiidae
- Subfamily: Gelechiinae
- Genus: Chretienella; Turati, 1919
- Species: C. vaucheri

Binomial name
- Chretienella vaucheri Turati, 1919

Genus of moths

Chretienella is a genus of moths in the family Gelechiidae. It contains the species Chretienella vaucheri, which is found in Morocco.
