= Pelocnistis =

Scientific classification
- Domain: Eukaryota
- Kingdom: Animalia
- Phylum: Arthropoda
- Class: Insecta
- Order: Lepidoptera
- Family: Gelechiidae
- Subfamily: Gelechiinae
- Genus: Pelocnistis; Meyrick, 1932
- Species: P. xylozona

Binomial name
- Pelocnistis xylozona Meyrick, 1932

Genus of moths

Pelocnistis is a genus of moth in the family Gelechiidae. It contains the species Pelocnistis xylozona, which is found in Brazil.
