= Adoxotricha =

Scientific classification
- Kingdom: Animalia
- Phylum: Arthropoda
- Class: Insecta
- Order: Lepidoptera
- Family: Gelechiidae
- Subfamily: Gelechiinae
- Genus: Adoxotricha; Meyrick, 1938
- Species: A. symbolistis

Binomial name
- Adoxotricha symbolistis Meyrick, 1938

Genus of moths

Adoxotricha is a genus of moth in the family Gelechiidae. It contains the species Adoxotricha symbolistis, which is found in the Democratic Republic of Congo (North Kivu).
