= Schmidtnielsenia =

Scientific classification
- Kingdom: Animalia
- Phylum: Arthropoda
- Clade: Pancrustacea
- Class: Insecta
- Order: Lepidoptera
- Family: Gelechiidae
- Tribe: Gnorimoschemini
- Genus: Schmidtnielsenia; Povolný, 1987
- Species: S. nielseni

Binomial name
- Schmidtnielsenia nielseni Povolný, 1987

Genus of moths

Schmidtnielsenia is a genus of moth in the family Gelechiidae. It contains the species Schmidtnielsenia nielseni, which is found in Argentina.
