= Peucoteles =

Scientific classification
- Kingdom: Animalia
- Phylum: Arthropoda
- Class: Insecta
- Order: Lepidoptera
- Family: Gelechiidae
- Subfamily: Gelechiinae
- Genus: Peucoteles; Meyrick, 1931
- Species: P. herpestica

Binomial name
- Peucoteles herpestica Meyrick, 1931

Genus of moths

Peucoteles is a monotypic moth genus in the family Gelechiidae. Its only species, Peucoteles herpestica, is found in Assam, India. Both the genus and species were first described by Edward Meyrick in 1931.

The larvae feed on Pinus khasia.
