= Sclerophantis =

Scientific classification
- Domain: Eukaryota
- Kingdom: Animalia
- Phylum: Arthropoda
- Class: Insecta
- Order: Lepidoptera
- Family: Gelechiidae
- Subfamily: Gelechiinae
- Genus: Sclerophantis; Meyrick, 1935
- Species: S. cyanocorys

Binomial name
- Sclerophantis cyanocorys Meyrick, 1935

Genus of moths

Sclerophantis is a genus of moth in the family Gelechiidae. It contains the species Sclerophantis cyanocorys, which is found in Indonesia (Java).
