= Sergeya =

Scientific classification
- Kingdom: Animalia
- Phylum: Arthropoda
- Class: Insecta
- Order: Lepidoptera
- Family: Gelechiidae
- Subfamily: Gelechiinae
- Tribe: Litini
- Genus: Sergeya; Ponomarenko, 2007
- Species: S. temulenta

Binomial name
- Sergeya temulenta (Omelko, 1998)

Synonyms
- Species synonymy: Sinevia temulenta Omelko, 1998

Genus of moths

Sergeya is a genus of moths in the family Gelechiidae. The genus contains the single species Sergeya temulenta.
