= Petalostomella =

Scientific classification
- Domain: Eukaryota
- Kingdom: Animalia
- Phylum: Arthropoda
- Class: Insecta
- Order: Lepidoptera
- Family: Gelechiidae
- Subfamily: Gelechiinae
- Genus: Petalostomella; T. B. Fletcher, 1940
- Species: P. lygrodes

Binomial name
- Petalostomella lygrodes (Meyrick, 1931)

Synonyms
- Petalostoma Meyrick, 1931 (preocc. Lidth de Jeude, 1829); Petalostoma lygrodes Meyrick, 1931

Genus of moths

Petalostomella is a monotypic moth genus in the family Gelechiidae first described in 1940 by English entomologist Thomas Bainbrigge Fletcher, who was appointed as the second Imperial Entomologist in India to succeed Harold Maxwell Lefroy. The Petalostomella genus contains the species Petalostomella lygrodes, described by Edward Meyrick in 1940, which is found in Assam, India.
