= Copticostola =

Scientific classification
- Domain: Eukaryota
- Kingdom: Animalia
- Phylum: Arthropoda
- Class: Insecta
- Order: Lepidoptera
- Family: Gelechiidae
- Subfamily: Gelechiinae
- Genus: Copticostola; Meyrick, 1929
- Species: C. acuminata

Binomial name
- Copticostola acuminata (Walsingham, 1911)

Synonyms
- Untomia acuminata Walsingham, 1911

Genus of moths

Copticostola is a genus of moths in the family Gelechiidae. It contains the species Copticostola acuminata, which is found in Tabasco, Mexico.

The wingspan is about 13 mm. The forewings are ivory-white, with three diffused fuscous dorsal patches, the first short at the flexus, the second before the middle, obliquely triangular, its apex crossing the fold, a third small and indistinct close to the tornus. Along the costa is a slender blackish streak at the base, and a narrow outwardly dilated dark brown costal shade beyond the middle, through which runs a very oblique white line to a conspicuous black spot at the apex. Beneath this spot the cilia are ivory-white, with a small transverse black streak descending through them from the apex and nearly joining a streak of brown scales projecting below it from a slender terminal line of the same. The hindwings and cilia are pale brownish grey, with a whitish spot at the produced apex.
