= Emmetrophysis =

Scientific classification
- Domain: Eukaryota
- Kingdom: Animalia
- Phylum: Arthropoda
- Class: Insecta
- Order: Lepidoptera
- Family: Gelechiidae
- Subfamily: Gelechiinae
- Genus: Emmetrophysis; Diakonoff, 1954
- Species: E. lanceolata

Binomial name
- Emmetrophysis lanceolata Diakonoff, 1954

Genus of moths

Emmetrophysis is a genus of moth in the family Gelechiidae. It contains the species Emmetrophysis lanceolata, which is found in New Guinea.
