= Arotromima =

Scientific classification
- Kingdom: Animalia
- Phylum: Arthropoda
- Class: Insecta
- Order: Lepidoptera
- Family: Gelechiidae
- Subfamily: Gelechiinae
- Genus: Arotromima; Meyrick, 1929
- Species: A. politica

Binomial name
- Arotromima politica Meyrick, 1929

Genus of moths

Arotromima is a genus of moth in the family Gelechiidae. It contains the species Arotromima politica, which is found in Guyana.

The wingspan is about 14 mm.
