= Pharangitis =

Scientific classification
- Domain: Eukaryota
- Kingdom: Animalia
- Phylum: Arthropoda
- Class: Insecta
- Order: Lepidoptera
- Family: Gelechiidae
- Subfamily: Gelechiinae
- Genus: Pharangitis; Meyrick, 1905
- Species: P. spathias

Binomial name
- Pharangitis spathias Meyrick, 1905

Genus of moths

Pharangitis is a genus of moth in the family Gelechiidae. It contains the species Pharangitis spathias, which is found in Sri Lanka.

The wingspan is about 15 mm. The forewings are rather deep brownish-ochreous with a clear white costal streak from the base to five-sixths, attenuated posteriorly. The dorsum is slenderly white towards the base. The hindwings are whitish-ochreous, slightly infuscated towards the apex.
