= Erikssonella =

Scientific classification
- Kingdom: Animalia
- Phylum: Arthropoda
- Class: Insecta
- Order: Lepidoptera
- Family: Gelechiidae
- Subfamily: Gelechiinae
- Genus: Erikssonella; Janse, 1960
- Species: E. permagna

Binomial name
- Erikssonella permagna (Meyrick, 1920)

Synonyms
- Compsolechia permagna Meyrick, 1920; Schizovalva permagna

Genus of moths

Erikssonella is a genus of moths in the family Gelechiidae. It contains the species Erikssonella permagna, which is found in South Africa.

The wingspan is about 30 mm. The forewings are whitish-ochreous, with scattered light brownish scales. The discal stigmata are irregular and light ferruginous-brown, with two or three blackish scales. There is a cloudy light ferruginous-brown line along the termen, with a few blackish scales. The hindwings are pale grey.
