= Stenovalva =

Scientific classification
- Kingdom: Animalia
- Phylum: Arthropoda
- Class: Insecta
- Order: Lepidoptera
- Family: Gelechiidae
- Subfamily: Gelechiinae
- Genus: Stenovalva; Amsel, 1955
- Species: S. disclusa

Binomial name
- Stenovalva disclusa (Meyrick, 1923)

Synonyms
- Telphusa disclusa Meyrick, 1923; Stenovalva ghorella Amsel, 1955

Genus of moths

Stenovalva is a genus of moths in the family Gelechiidae. It contains the species Stenovalva disclusa, which is found in Israel.

The wingspan is about 15 mm. The forewings are grey confusedly speckled white and irregularly sprinkled blackish. There is a slender ochreous streak from the base above the middle to the costa beyond the middle, the posterior part suffused and hardly defined. A black dot is found on the lower edge of this at one-fourth of the wing and one in the middle of the disc (representing the first discal stigma). There is also a transverse mark of raised white and dark grey scales on the end of the cell, enlarged at the lower extremity. The hindwings are pale iridescent violet-grey.
