= Coniogyra =

Scientific classification
- Kingdom: Animalia
- Phylum: Arthropoda
- Class: Insecta
- Order: Lepidoptera
- Family: Gelechiidae
- Subfamily: Gelechiinae
- Genus: Coniogyra; Meyrick, 1921
- Species: C. dilucescens

Binomial name
- Coniogyra dilucescens Meyrick, 1921

Genus of moths

Coniogyra is a genus of moth in the family Gelechiidae. It contains the species Coniogyra dilucescens, which is found in Zimbabwe.

The wingspan is about 7 mm. The forewings are whitish, in the disc with a few grey scales, towards the margins rather strongly irrorated (speckled) with dark grey. The plical and second discal stigmata are obscure and grey. The hindwings are pale grey.
