= Syncathedra =

Scientific classification
- Domain: Eukaryota
- Kingdom: Animalia
- Phylum: Arthropoda
- Class: Insecta
- Order: Lepidoptera
- Family: Gelechiidae
- Subfamily: Gelechiinae
- Genus: Syncathedra; Meyrick, 1923
- Species: S. criminata

Binomial name
- Syncathedra criminata Meyrick, 1923

Genus of moths

Syncathedra is a genus of moth in the family Gelechiidae. It contains the species Syncathedra criminata, which is found in India (Assam).

The wingspan is 15–20 mm for males and 18–25 mm for females. The forewings are dark fuscous in males, while they are fuscous in females, with the bases of the scales more or less whitish. There are more or less developed streaks of coarse black irroration between the veins. The stigmata form suffused irregular black spots, with the plical rather beyond the first discal. The hindwings of the males are dark fuscous and rather dark grey in females.
