= Coudia =

Scientific classification
- Domain: Eukaryota
- Kingdom: Animalia
- Phylum: Arthropoda
- Class: Insecta
- Order: Lepidoptera
- Family: Gelechiidae
- Subfamily: Gelechiinae
- Genus: Coudia; Chrétien, 1915
- Species: C. strictella

Binomial name
- Coudia strictella Chrétien, 1915

Genus of moths

Coudia is a genus of moths in the family Gelechiidae. It contains the species Coudia strictella, which is found in Algeria.

The wingspan is 10 mm. The forewings are greyish-yellow, with the base, median and terminal areas brown-reddish. The hindwings are uniform brown-reddish.
