= Eunomarcha =

Scientific classification
- Kingdom: Animalia
- Phylum: Arthropoda
- Class: Insecta
- Order: Lepidoptera
- Family: Gelechiidae
- Subfamily: Gelechiinae
- Genus: Eunomarcha; Meyrick, 1923
- Species: E. violacea

Binomial name
- Eunomarcha violacea (Busck, 1914)

Synonyms
- Atoponeura Busck, 1914; Atoponeura violacea Busck, 1914; Eunomarcha glycinopis Meyrick, 1923

Genus of moths

Eunomarcha is a genus of moths in the family Gelechiidae. It contains the species Eunomarcha violacea, which is found in Brazil (Amazonas) and Panama.

The wingspan is about 14 mm. The forewings are black, overlaid with metallic, light blue scales and with a strong purplish sheen, especially toward the apex, which, as well as the cilia, in certain light appear like burnished copper. The hindwings are dark fuscous.
