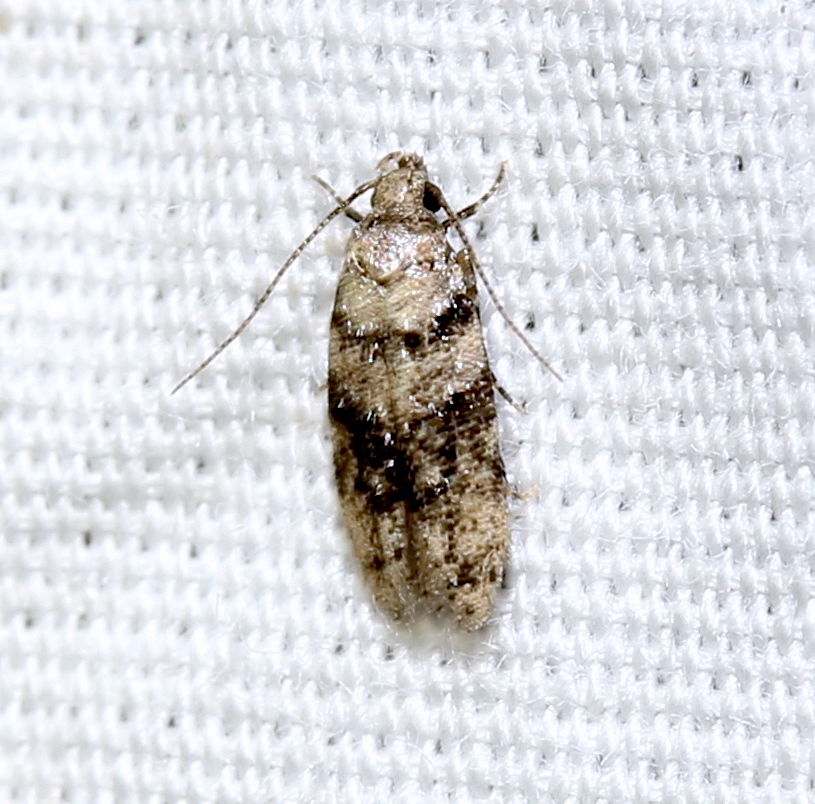

Scientific classification
- Kingdom: Animalia
- Phylum: Arthropoda
- Clade: Pancrustacea
- Class: Insecta
- Order: Lepidoptera
- Family: Gelechiidae
- Subfamily: Gelechiinae
- Tribe: Litini
- Genus: Arcutelphusa; Lee & Brown, 2008
- Species: A. talladega

Binomial name
- Arcutelphusa talladega Lee & Brown, 2008

= Arcutelphusa =

Genus of moths

Arcutelphusa is a genus of moths in the family Gelechiidae. It contains only one species, Arcutelphusa talladega, which is found in North America, where it has been recorded from Alabama, North Carolina and Mississippi.

The wingspan is 8.5–10 mm.
