= Phylopatris =

Scientific classification
- Domain: Eukaryota
- Kingdom: Animalia
- Phylum: Arthropoda
- Class: Insecta
- Order: Lepidoptera
- Family: Gelechiidae
- Tribe: Gnorimoschemini
- Genus: Phylopatris; Meyrick, 1923
- Species: P. terpnodes

Binomial name
- Phylopatris terpnodes Meyrick, 1923

Genus of insects

Phylopatris is a genus of moth in the family Gelechiidae. It contains the single species Phylopatris terpnodes, which is found in Brazil (Amazonas) and Peru.

The wingspan is about 9 mm. The forewings are white with an oblique brownish-ochreous fascia near the base, black on the costa and with a black subdorsal tuft on the posterior edge. There are elongated black dots on the costa before the middle and at two-thirds, beneath suffused brownish-ochreous. The discal stigmata are black, with patches of brownish-ochreous suffusion in the disc between them and towards the middle of the dorsum, a black subdorsal raised dot beneath the second, beneath this a brownish-ochreous dorsal spot edged black dorsally. There is a short black dash surrounded by brownish-ochreous suffusion in the disc posteriorly, two black specks on the costa near the apex, and some brownish-ochreous suffusion around these. The hindwings are grey.
