= Euzonomacha =

Scientific classification
- Kingdom: Animalia
- Phylum: Arthropoda
- Class: Insecta
- Order: Lepidoptera
- Family: Gelechiidae
- Subfamily: Gelechiinae
- Genus: Euzonomacha; Meyrick, 1925
- Species: E. subjectella

Binomial name
- Euzonomacha subjectella (Walker, 1864)

Synonyms
- Gelechia subjectella Walker, 1864

Genus of moths

Euzonomacha is a genus of moths in the family Gelechiidae. It contains the species Euzonomacha subjectella, which is found in Brazil (Amazonas) and Peru.

Adults are cupreous, the forewings with a broad gilded red band, which emits a streak to the exterior border, and is bounded on the inner side by an oblique purple line. There are some purple points towards the base, and an oblique purple black-bordered streak in the band. The space beyond the band is black, with three purple streaks and the exterior border is very oblique. The hindwings are white towards the base, except in front.
