= Elasiprora =

Scientific classification
- Kingdom: Animalia
- Phylum: Arthropoda
- Class: Insecta
- Order: Lepidoptera
- Family: Gelechiidae
- Subfamily: Gelechiinae
- Genus: Elasiprora; Meyrick, 1914
- Species: E. rostrifera

Binomial name
- Elasiprora rostrifera Meyrick, 1914

Genus of moths

Elasiprora is a genus of moths in the family Gelechiidae. It contains the species Elasiprora rostrifera, which is found in Guyana.

The wingspan is 7–8 mm. The forewings are light ochreous-brown, the costa suffused with black, cut by very oblique white strigulae from before the middle and at three-fourths. There is a slender black median streak from the base to the middle, its apex dilated and sending an oblique projection upwards, edged above throughout by a white line which is extended to join a similar margin of an irregular sinuate black streak from the apex of the wing to the disc about two-thirds, the connecting portion also sometimes edged beneath with black irroration. There is a suffused white subdorsal line from the base to about the middle and the dilation of the median streak is edged posteriorly with white, and sending a suffused white streak to the lower part of the termen, and a suffused white line surrounded with more or less black irroration to the tornus. The hindwings are grey.
