= Catalexis (moth) =

Scientific classification
- Kingdom: Animalia
- Phylum: Arthropoda
- Clade: Pancrustacea
- Class: Insecta
- Order: Lepidoptera
- Family: Gelechiidae
- Subfamily: Gelechiinae
- Genus: Catalexis; Walsingham, 1909
- Species: C. tapinota

Binomial name
- Catalexis tapinota Walsingham, 1909

Genus of moths

Catalexis is a genus of moths in the family Gelechiidae. It contains the species Catalexis tapinota, which is found in Guatemala.

The wingspan is about 12 mm. The forewings are fawn-brownish, shaded with dark fuscous (almost black), a very narrow streak of this along the base of the costa to one-fifth, an elongate patch from the base of the dorsum below the fold, extending nearly to the dorsal cilia, above it a shorter cloud-like patch on the cell commencing before and extending a little beyond the middle of the wing. The whole apical fourth is overlaid with dark fuscous, the anterior margin of this dark patch lying almost parallel to the termen, but somewhat attenuated to the apex, a few fawn-brown scales in this patch opposite to the termen. The hindwings are dark fuscous, with some brownish ochreous scales intermixed along the costa and dorsum.
