= Sclerograptis =

Scientific classification
- Domain: Eukaryota
- Kingdom: Animalia
- Phylum: Arthropoda
- Class: Insecta
- Order: Lepidoptera
- Family: Gelechiidae
- Subfamily: Gelechiinae
- Genus: Sclerograptis; Meyrick, 1923
- Species: S. oxytypa

Binomial name
- Sclerograptis oxytypa Meyrick, 1923

Genus of moths

Sclerograptis is a genus of moth in the family Gelechiidae. It contains the species Sclerograptis oxytypa, which is found in Guyana.
