= Phloeocecis =

Scientific classification
- Domain: Eukaryota
- Kingdom: Animalia
- Phylum: Arthropoda
- Class: Insecta
- Order: Lepidoptera
- Family: Gelechiidae
- Tribe: Gnorimoschemini
- Genus: Phloeocecis; Chrétien, 1908
- Species: P. cherregella

Binomial name
- Phloeocecis cherregella Chrétien, 1908

Synonyms
- Lita cecidiella Chrétien, 1915; Phloeocecis fagoniae Meyrick, 1925

Genus of moths

Phloeocecis is a genus of moths in the family Gelechiidae. It contains the single species Phloeocecis cherregella, which is found in Algeria.
