= Cnaphostola =

Scientific classification
- Kingdom: Animalia
- Phylum: Arthropoda
- Class: Insecta
- Order: Lepidoptera
- Family: Gelechiidae
- Subfamily: Gelechiinae
- Genus: Cnaphostola; Meyrick, 1918
- Species: C. adamantina

Binomial name
- Cnaphostola adamantina Meyrick, 1918

Genus of moths

Cnaphostola is a genus of moth in the family Gelechiidae. It contains the species Cnaphostola adamantina, which is found in Assam, India.

The wingspan is 19–21 mm. The forewings are grey, more or less marked irregularly by transversely dark purplish-fuscous or purple-blackish, especially tending to form a blotch of two or three transverse streaks from the costa before the middle, and sometimes a patch of suffusion along the anterior portion of the dorsum and usually more or less whitish suffusion along the fold and dorsal area on the anterior half of the wing. There is a cloudy whitish dot in the disc at two-thirds, as well as small cloudy dark marginal spots posteriorly. The hindwings are grey.
