= Tricyphistis =

Scientific classification
- Domain: Eukaryota
- Kingdom: Animalia
- Phylum: Arthropoda
- Class: Insecta
- Order: Lepidoptera
- Family: Gelechiidae
- Subfamily: Gelechiinae
- Genus: Tricyphistis; Meyrick, 1934
- Species: T. cyanorma

Binomial name
- Tricyphistis cyanorma Meyrick, 1934

Genus of moths

Tricyphistis is a genus of moth in the family Gelechiidae. It contains the species Tricyphistis cyanorma, which is found in Taiwan.
