= Tanycyttara =

Scientific classification
- Domain: Eukaryota
- Kingdom: Animalia
- Phylum: Arthropoda
- Class: Insecta
- Order: Lepidoptera
- Family: Gelechiidae
- Subfamily: Gelechiinae
- Genus: Tanycyttara; Turner, 1933
- Species: T. xanthomochla

Binomial name
- Tanycyttara xanthomochla Turner, 1933

Genus of moths

Tanycyttara is a monotypic genus of Australian moths in the family Gelechiidae containing the sole species Tanycyttara xanthomochla, which is found in Australia, where it has been recorded from Queensland.

The wingspan is about 15 mm.
