= Pseudarla =

Scientific classification
- Domain: Eukaryota
- Kingdom: Animalia
- Phylum: Arthropoda
- Class: Insecta
- Order: Lepidoptera
- Family: Gelechiidae
- Genus: Pseudaria; Clarke, 1965
- Species: P. miranda

Binomial name
- Pseudarla miranda Clarke, 1965

Genus of moths

Pseudarla is a genus of moth in the family Gelechiidae. It contains the species Pseudarla miranda, which is found on the Galapagos Islands.

The wingspan is about 23 mm. The forewings are avellaneous (dull grayish brown), the costa is lightly suffused with fuscous to the outer two-thirds from which point an outwardly oblique, transverse, fuscous band extends to vein 6, then inwardly to the tornus. There is a blotch on the dorsum at one-third and three fuscous discal spots. The inner and outer discal spots are small and ill-defined, while the central one is larger and more distinct. A slender fuscous dash extends beneath the central discal spot in the fold, beyond the basal discal spot. There are three fuscous bars on the costa, beyond the transverse band, confluent with the apical fuscous shading. The hindwings are brownish buff with some fuscous suffusion.
