= Locharcha =

Scientific classification
- Domain: Eukaryota
- Kingdom: Animalia
- Phylum: Arthropoda
- Class: Insecta
- Order: Lepidoptera
- Family: Gelechiidae
- Subfamily: Gelechiinae
- Genus: Locharcha; Meyrick, 1923
- Species: L. emicans

Binomial name
- Locharcha emicans Meyrick, 1923

Genus of moths

Locharcha is a genus of moths in the family Gelechiidae. It contains the species Locharcha emicans, which is found in Peru.

The wingspan is about 14 mm. The forewings are dark ashy-fuscous slightly speckled purple-whitish and with a moderate pointed whitish-ochreous dorsal streak from the base to the tornus, slightly speckled blackish, the upper edge margined with blackish suffusion from the base to an obtuse postmedian prominence. There is a black streak from the disc before the middle to the apex, interrupted beyond the middle by a spot of brown suffusion, at the apex expanded into a blotch including a small light ochreous spot. There is also an oblique whitish strigula on the costa at three-fourths. The hindwings are rather dark grey.
