= Lachnostola =

Scientific classification
- Domain: Eukaryota
- Kingdom: Animalia
- Phylum: Arthropoda
- Class: Insecta
- Order: Lepidoptera
- Family: Gelechiidae
- Subfamily: Gelechiinae
- Genus: Lachnostola; Meyrick, 1918
- Species: L. amphizeucta

Binomial name
- Lachnostola amphizeucta Meyrick, 1918

Genus of moths

Lachnostola is a monotypic moth genus in the family Gelechiidae. Its only species, Lachnostola amphizeucta, is found in South Africa. Both the genus and species were first described by Edward Meyrick in 1918.

The wingspan is 8–11 mm. The forewings are pale ochreous yellowish with a narrow dark fuscous streak along the costa from the base to two-fifths and there is a dark fuscous streak along the dorsum from near the base to three-fourths. There is a deep ochreous spot surrounded with blackish suffusion resting on this before the middle of the wing. A triangular dark grey blotch extends on the costa from the middle to three-fourths and reaching half across the wing. The discal stigmata are blackish, the second just below the apex of the costal blotch and there is more or less yellow-ochreous suffusion towards the tornal area, with scattered blackish scales. There is also an apical spot of blackish suffusion. The hindwings are grey.
