= Toxotacma =

Scientific classification
- Kingdom: Animalia
- Phylum: Arthropoda
- Class: Insecta
- Order: Lepidoptera
- Family: Gelechiidae
- Subfamily: Gelechiinae
- Genus: Toxotacma; Meyrick, 1929
- Species: T. meditans

Binomial name
- Toxotacma meditans Meyrick, 1929

Genus of moths

Toxotacma is a genus of moth in the family Gelechiidae. It contains the species Toxotacma meditans, which is found in India (Assam).

The wingspan is about 10 mm.
