= Meteoristis =

Scientific classification
- Domain: Eukaryota
- Kingdom: Animalia
- Phylum: Arthropoda
- Class: Insecta
- Order: Lepidoptera
- Family: Gelechiidae
- Subfamily: Gelechiinae
- Genus: Meteoristis; Meyrick, 1923
- Species: M. religiosa

Binomial name
- Meteoristis religiosa Meyrick, 1923

Genus of moths

Meteoristis is a genus of moth in the family Gelechiidae. It contains the species Meteoristis religiosa, which is found in India (Bengal).

The wingspan is about 16 mm. The forewings are whitish-ochreous slightly tinged grey and irregularly sprinkled dark grey and blackish with a small dark fuscous spot above the dorsum near the base. There are small spots of blackish suffusion representing the plical and first discal stigmata, forming with a larger spot on the middle of the costa, an inwards-oblique series. There is some darker subterminal suffusion and a row of cloudy dark marginal dots around the posterior part of the costa and termen. The hindwings are light grey.

The larvae feed on Ficus religiosa. They bore the aerial roots of their host plant.
