= Gobipalpa =

Scientific classification
- Kingdom: Animalia
- Phylum: Arthropoda
- Clade: Pancrustacea
- Class: Insecta
- Order: Lepidoptera
- Family: Gelechiidae
- Tribe: Gnorimoschemini
- Genus: Gobipalpa; Povolný, 1973
- Species: G. inexpectata

Binomial name
- Gobipalpa inexpectata Povolný, 1973

Genus of moths

Gobipalpa is a genus of moths in the family Gelechiidae. It contains the species Gobipalpa inexpectata. It is found in Mongolia.
