= Oncerozancla =

Scientific classification
- Domain: Eukaryota
- Kingdom: Animalia
- Phylum: Arthropoda
- Class: Insecta
- Order: Lepidoptera
- Family: Gelechiidae
- Subfamily: Gelechiinae
- Genus: Oncerozancla; Turner, 1933
- Species: O. euopa

Binomial name
- Oncerozancla euopa Turner, 1933

Genus of moths

Oncerozancla is a genus of moth in the family Gelechiidae. It contains the species Oncerozancla euopa, which is found in Australia, where it has been recorded from Queensland.
