= Metopleura =

Scientific classification
- Kingdom: Animalia
- Phylum: Arthropoda
- Clade: Pancrustacea
- Class: Insecta
- Order: Lepidoptera
- Family: Gelechiidae
- Tribe: Gelechiini
- Genus: Metopleura; Busck, 1912
- Species: M. potosi

Binomial name
- Metopleura potosi Busck, 1912

Genus of moths

Metopleura is a genus of moth in the family Gelechiidae. It only contains the species Metopleura potosi, which is found in Mexico (San Luis Potosi).

The wingspan is 30–36 mm. The forewings are ochreous, longitudinally streaked with lighter whitish ochreous along the vein. From near the base of the costa runs an outwardly oblique blackish fuscous streak across half the wing and at the apical fourth on the dorsal side is found a poorly defined blackish streak, parallel with the termen. There is a series of poorly defined dark marginal dots around the apical and terminal edge. The hindwings are shining, dark fuscous with a light ochreous marginal line on the base of the cilia.
