= Karwandania =

Scientific classification
- Domain: Eukaryota
- Kingdom: Animalia
- Phylum: Arthropoda
- Class: Insecta
- Order: Lepidoptera
- Family: Gelechiidae
- Subfamily: Gelechiinae
- Genus: Karwandania; Amsel, 1959
- Species: K. chimabacchella

Binomial name
- Karwandania chimabacchella Amsel, 1959

Genus of moths

Karwandania is a genus of moths in the family Gelechiidae. It contains the species Karwandania chimabacchella, which is found in Iran.

The wingspan is about 17 mm. The forewings are dirty grey with vague markings. The hindwings are dark grey.
