= Menecratistis =

Scientific classification
- Domain: Eukaryota
- Kingdom: Animalia
- Phylum: Arthropoda
- Class: Insecta
- Order: Lepidoptera
- Family: Gelechiidae
- Subfamily: Gelechiinae
- Genus: Menecratistis; Meyrick, 1933
- Species: M. sciaula

Binomial name
- Menecratistis sciaula Meyrick, 1933

Genus of moths

Menecratistis is a genus of moth in the family Gelechiidae. It contains the species Menecratistis sciaula, which is found in New Guinea.
