= Logisis =

Scientific classification
- Domain: Eukaryota
- Kingdom: Animalia
- Phylum: Arthropoda
- Class: Insecta
- Order: Lepidoptera
- Family: Gelechiidae
- Subfamily: Gelechiinae
- Genus: Logisis; Walsingham, 1909
- Species: L. achroea

Binomial name
- Logisis achroea Walsingham, 1909

Genus of moths

Logisis is a genus of moths in the family Gelechiidae. It contains the species Logisis achroea, which is found in Costa Rica.

The wingspan is about 40 mm. The forewings are shining, very pale ochreous, somewhat shaded along the cell, on the fold, and along the dorsum with fawn-brown; a brown. There is a spot below the costa near the base, and a narrow brown costal shade at the extreme base. The hindwings are shining straw-grey.
