= Ochmastis =

Scientific classification
- Kingdom: Animalia
- Phylum: Arthropoda
- Class: Insecta
- Order: Lepidoptera
- Family: Gelechiidae
- Subfamily: Gelechiinae
- Genus: Ochmastis; Meyrick, 1908
- Species: O. chionacma

Binomial name
- Ochmastis chionacma Meyrick, 1908

Genus of moths

Ochmastis is a genus of moth in the family Gelechiidae. It contains the species Ochmastis chionacma, which is found in southern Burma.

The wingspan is about 16 mm. The forewings are white, irregularly sprinkled with dark fuscous and with two small dark fuscous spots near the base above and below the middle, the upper marked with black. There is an irregular quadrate dark fuscous patch on the dorsum before the middle, reaching three-fourths across the wing, enclosing an elongate pale yellow-ochreous blotch of somewhat raised scales dilated posteriorly and edged above with a few black scales. There are three subconfluent dark fuscous blotches forming an irregular streak from the middle of the disc to five-sixths of the costa, crossed by an interrupted thick black streak in the disc from before the middle to three-fourths, and two or three short black streaks on the veins beyond this. An elongate black mark is found on the costa before the middle and the apical area forms a roundish clear white spot, edged by a marginal black line. The hindwings are grey, thinly scaled towards the base.
