= Darlia =

Scientific classification
- Kingdom: Animalia
- Phylum: Arthropoda
- Class: Insecta
- Order: Lepidoptera
- Family: Gelechiidae
- Subfamily: Gelechiinae
- Genus: Darlia; Clarke, 1950
- Species: D. praetexta

Binomial name
- Darlia praetexta Clarke, 1950

Genus of moths

Darlia is a monotypic genus of moth in the family Gelechiidae containing the single species Darlia praetexta. It was described by J. F. Gates Clarke in 1950. It is only found in Argentina.

The wingspan is 10–11 mm.
