= Thymosopha =

Scientific classification
- Domain: Eukaryota
- Kingdom: Animalia
- Phylum: Arthropoda
- Class: Insecta
- Order: Lepidoptera
- Family: Gelechiidae
- Subfamily: Gelechiinae
- Genus: Thymosopha; Meyrick, 1914
- Species: T. antileuca

Binomial name
- Thymosopha antileuca Meyrick, 1914

Genus of moths

Thymosopha is a genus of moth in the family Gelechiidae. It contains the species Thymosopha antileuca, which is found in South Africa.

The wingspan is 14–15 mm. The forewings are dark fuscous, with slight purple gloss and a triangular white blotch on the dorsum before the middle, its apex almost touching the costa at one-fourth. There is a smaller triangular white blotch on the costa at three-fourths, reaching half across the wing. The hindwings are grey.
