= Apocritica =

Scientific classification
- Kingdom: Animalia
- Phylum: Arthropoda
- Clade: Pancrustacea
- Class: Insecta
- Order: Lepidoptera
- Family: Gelechiidae
- Genus: Apocritica; Meyrick, 1925
- Species: A. chromatica

Binomial name
- Apocritica chromatica (Meyrick, 1911)

Synonyms
- Chaliniastis chromatica Meyrick, 1911

Genus of moths

Apocritica is a genus of moth in the family Gelechiidae. There is only one species in this genus, Apocritica chromatica, that is found on the Seychelles.

The wingspan is about 10 mm. The forewings are ferruginous, sprinkled with grey and the costa is suffused with dark fuscous, and marked with four irregular oblique white streaks, and two ochreous-white spots before the apex. There is a trilobate patch of ground colour on the middle of the dorsum edged with some black scales and then with a white line. Before and beyond this are curved white lines in the disc, edged beneath with black scales, appearing to indicate somewhat rounded patches, but not extended to the dorsum. There is a sinuate white line from the penultimate costal spot to the tornus and a white line along the termen, edged with some black scales. The hindwings are light grey.
