= Barticeja =

Scientific classification
- Kingdom: Animalia
- Phylum: Arthropoda
- Clade: Pancrustacea
- Class: Insecta
- Order: Lepidoptera
- Family: Gelechiidae
- Subfamily: Gelechiinae
- Genus: Barticeja; Povolný, 1967
- Species: B. epitricha

Binomial name
- Barticeja epitricha (Meyrick, 1917)

Synonyms
- Phthorimaea epitricha Meyrick, 1917; Telphusa ochrotoma Meyrick, 1923

Genus of moths

Barticeja is a genus of moths in the family Gelechiidae. It contains the species Barticeja epitricha, which is found in Brazil (Pará, Amazonas) and Guyana.

The wingspan is 8–10 mm. The forewings are grey-whitish irrorated (speckled) with dark fuscous and with a blackish spot or short oblique bar from the costa near the base. There is a small ochreous spot on the fold at one-fifth, sometimes edged above and beneath with small blackish spots. A thick oblique blackish streak is found from one-third of the costa to the fold. The stigmata are ochreous, more or less edged above and beneath with small blackish spots, the plical obliquely before the first discal, an elongate cloudy blackish spot on the costa just above the second discal, sometimes edged beneath by another ochreous dot. There are undefined spots of blackish suffusion on the tornus and at the apex. The hindwings are grey, subhyaline (almost glassy) in the disc anteriorly and towards the dorsum.
