= Latrologa =

Scientific classification
- Domain: Eukaryota
- Kingdom: Animalia
- Phylum: Arthropoda
- Class: Insecta
- Order: Lepidoptera
- Family: Gelechiidae
- Subfamily: Gelechiinae
- Genus: Latrologa; Meyrick, 1918
- Species: L. aoropis

Binomial name
- Latrologa aoropis Meyrick, 1918

Genus of moths

Latrologa is a genus of moths in the family Gelechiidae. It contains the species Latrologa aoropis, which is found in Sri Lanka.

The wingspan is 11–12 mm. The forewings are ochreous-whitish, irregularly sprinkled dark fuscous and with cloudy elongate dark fuscous costal spots at the base, one-fourth, and the middle. The stigmata are represented by cloudy dark fuscous spots, the plical somewhat beyond the first discal, the second discal large, roundish, preceded by a small additional spot. There are several small irregular spots before the margins posteriorly. The hindwings are light grey.
