= Rifseria =

Scientific classification
- Kingdom: Animalia
- Phylum: Arthropoda
- Clade: Pancrustacea
- Class: Insecta
- Order: Lepidoptera
- Family: Gelechiidae
- Tribe: Gelechiini
- Genus: Rifseria; Hodges, 1966
- Species: R. fuscotaeniaella

Binomial name
- Rifseria fuscotaeniaella (Chambers, 1878)

Synonyms
- Gelechia fuscotaeniaella Chambers, 1878

Genus of moths

Rifseria is a genus of moth in the family Gelechiidae. It contains only one species, Rifseria fuscotaeniaella, which is found in North America from Manitoba and British Columbia to eastern Colorado, Utah, Nevada, Arizona and coastal California.

The larvae feed on Anaphalis and Gnaphalium species. They mine the leaves of their host plant.
