= Magonympha =

Scientific classification
- Domain: Eukaryota
- Kingdom: Animalia
- Phylum: Arthropoda
- Class: Insecta
- Order: Lepidoptera
- Family: Gelechiidae
- Tribe: Gnorimoschemini
- Genus: Magonympha; Meyrick, 1916
- Species: M. chrysocosma

Binomial name
- Magonympha chrysocosma Meyrick, 1916

Genus of moths

Magonympha is a genus of moth in the family Gelechiidae. It contains the species Magonympha chrysocosma, which is found in southern India.

The wingspan is 10–13 mm. The forewings are bronzy-yellow-ochreous with four narrow silvery-white transverse fasciae, in the disc more silvery or in lowland specimens pale golden-metallic, more or less edged with dark fuscous irroration, somewhat dilated at the extremities, the first at one-third, the second in the middle, slightly oblique, the third at two-thirds and the fourth at five-sixths, narrowest and rather inwards-oblique. The hindwings are ochreous-whitish.
