= Fortinea =

Scientific classification
- Domain: Eukaryota
- Kingdom: Animalia
- Phylum: Arthropoda
- Class: Insecta
- Order: Lepidoptera
- Family: Gelechiidae
- Subfamily: Gelechiinae
- Genus: Fortinea; Busck, 1914
- Species: F. auriciliella

Binomial name
- Fortinea auriciliella Busck, 1914

Genus of moths

Fortinea is a genus of moths in the family Gelechiidae. It contains the species Fortinea auriciliella, which is found in Panama.

The wingspan is about 24 mm. The forewings are light ochreous brown with the extreme costal edge blackish brown. Below this runs a thin, light ochreous, submarginal line from the base to the apex, where it turns obliquely inward straight to the middle of the fold. This thin ochreous line is edged above with dark brown and is faintly continued along the fold to the base of the wing. Along the terminal edge is a dark brown submarginal line, beyond which the wing and the cilia are strongly metallic golden. The hindwings are dark brownish fuscous with golden yellow tips.
