= Hypodrasia =

Scientific classification
- Domain: Eukaryota
- Kingdom: Animalia
- Phylum: Arthropoda
- Class: Insecta
- Order: Lepidoptera
- Family: Gelechiidae
- Subfamily: Gelechiinae
- Genus: Hypodrasia; Diakonoff, [1968]
- Species: H. acycla

Binomial name
- Hypodrasia acycla Diakonoff, [1968]

Genus of moths

Hypodrasia is a genus of moth in the family Gelechiidae. It contains the species Hypodrasia acycla, which is found in the Philippines (Luzon).

The wingspan is about 11 mm for males and 13–16 mm for females. The forewings are sordid greyish white or ochreous white, densely suffused and irrorated with grey and dark fuscous, more so along the costa and especially on the posterior sixth of the wing. There is a rather faint, sinuate and vertical transverse darker grey fascia at three-fourths, the upper fourth straight and darker, the lower three-fourths strongly convex posteriorly, suffused and fainter. This fascia is suffusedly edged with paler posteriorly. There is a series of faint darker dots along the costa before the apex, in the apex and along the termen to the tornus and the base of the costa is suffused with blackish. A faint darker spot is found on the costa before the middle and there are two round black dots in an inwards-oblique series in the disc beyond the base. There is also a large, conspicuous black spot in the fold before one-third, sometimes reaching the dorsal edge and rising above the middle of the disc. The second discal stigma is very small, before two-thirds, with a small elongate mark right below it, sometimes beyond it. The hindwings are glossy pale bronze grey, finely irrorated with fuscous, more so towards apex.
