= Lacharissa =

Scientific classification
- Domain: Eukaryota
- Kingdom: Animalia
- Phylum: Arthropoda
- Class: Insecta
- Order: Lepidoptera
- Family: Gelechiidae
- Subfamily: Gelechiinae
- Genus: Lacharissa; Meyrick, 1937
- Species: L. tanyzancla

Binomial name
- Lacharissa tanyzancla Meyrick, 1937

Genus of moths

Lacharissa is a genus of moths in the family Gelechiidae. It contains the species Lacharissa tanyzancla, which is found in South Africa.

The wingspan is about 38 mm.
