= Thaumaturgis =

Scientific classification
- Domain: Eukaryota
- Kingdom: Animalia
- Phylum: Arthropoda
- Class: Insecta
- Order: Lepidoptera
- Family: Gelechiidae
- Subfamily: Gelechiinae
- Genus: Thaumaturgis; Meyrick, 1934
- Species: T. craterocrossa

Binomial name
- Thaumaturgis craterocrossa Meyrick, 1934

Genus of moths

Thaumaturgis is a monotypic moth genus in the family Gelechiidae. Its single species, Thaumaturgis craterocrossa, is found in South Africa. Both the genus and species were first described by Edward Meyrick in 1934.
