= Tabernillaia =

Scientific classification
- Domain: Eukaryota
- Kingdom: Animalia
- Phylum: Arthropoda
- Class: Insecta
- Order: Lepidoptera
- Family: Gelechiidae
- Subfamily: Gelechiinae
- Genus: Tabernillaia; Walsingham, 1911
- Species: T. ephialtes

Binomial name
- Tabernillaia ephialtes Walsingham, 1911

Synonyms
- Tabernillaea Meyrick, 1925

Genus of moths

Tabernillaia is a genus of moth in the family Gelechiidae. It contains the species Tabernillaia ephialtes, which is found in Panama.

The wingspan is about 10 mm. The forewings are dark bronzy fuscous, with a slight coppery tinge about the middle of the wing in a strong light. An outwardly oblique, ovate, snow-white patch descends from the costa, at about one-sixth, slightly overreaching the fold. Another, rounded, rather smaller white spot lies on the costa at about one-fourth from the apex. The hindwings are shining, pale bronzy grey.
