= Reichardtiella =

Scientific classification
- Kingdom: Animalia
- Phylum: Arthropoda
- Clade: Pancrustacea
- Class: Insecta
- Order: Lepidoptera
- Family: Gelechiidae
- Subfamily: Gelechiinae
- Genus: Reichardtiella; Filipjev, 1931
- Species: R. grisea

Binomial name
- Reichardtiella grisea Filipjev, 1931

Genus of moths

Reichardtiella is a genus of moth in the family Gelechiidae. It contains the species Reichardtiella grisea, which is found in the Pamir Mountains.
