= Trypherogenes =

Scientific classification
- Domain: Eukaryota
- Kingdom: Animalia
- Phylum: Arthropoda
- Class: Insecta
- Order: Lepidoptera
- Family: Gelechiidae
- Subfamily: Gelechiinae
- Genus: Trypherogenes; Meyrick, 1931
- Species: T. chrysodesma

Binomial name
- Trypherogenes chrysodesma Meyrick, 1931

Genus of moths

Trypherogenes is a genus of moth in the family Gelechiidae. It contains the species Trypherogenes chrysodesma, which is found in Indonesia (Sulawesi).
