= Oxylechia =

Scientific classification
- Kingdom: Animalia
- Phylum: Arthropoda
- Clade: Pancrustacea
- Class: Insecta
- Order: Lepidoptera
- Family: Gelechiidae
- Subfamily: Gelechiinae
- Genus: Oxylechia; Meyrick, 1917
- Species: O. confirmata

Binomial name
- Oxylechia confirmata Meyrick, 1917

Genus of moths

Oxylechia is a genus of moth in the family Gelechiidae. It contains the species Oxylechia confirmata, which is found in Colombia.

The wingspan is about 8 mm. The forewings are white, tinged with ochreous-yellowish in the disc, more strongly and sprinkled with fuscous posteriorly. The markings are dark fuscous, with some black scales on their edges, and margined with clear white. There is a basal patch, the edge running from one-fourth of the costa, straight, oblique. There is also an elongate narrow patch extending along the costa from before the middle to the apex, anteriorly pointed and preceded by a slight blackish strigula, beneath with slight prominences at the middle and two-thirds of the wing, tipped with black scales probably representing the discal stigmata. A small white costal mark intersects this at four-fifths and there are narrow elongate brownish spots sprinkled with black on the dorsum beyond the middle and on the tornus. There is also a black apical dot ringed with white. The hindwings are whitish-grey.
