= Trychnopalpa =

Scientific classification
- Kingdom: Animalia
- Phylum: Arthropoda
- Class: Insecta
- Order: Lepidoptera
- Family: Gelechiidae
- Subfamily: Gelechiinae
- Genus: Trychnopalpa; Janse, 1958
- Species: T. fornacaria

Binomial name
- Trychnopalpa fornacaria (Meyrick, 1913)

Synonyms
- Synthesiopalpa Povolny, 1966; Gelechia fornacaria Meyrick, 1913; Synthesiopalpa fornacaria

Genus of moths

Trychnopalpa is a monotypic moth genus in the family Gelechiidae. The only member of the genus was described by Edward Meyrick in 1913, and it was separated by Anthonie Johannes Theodorus Janse in his 1958 The Moths of South Africa. Dalibor F. Povolný gave the same member of this genus the now synonymised generic name Synthesiopalpa. The genus contains only one species, Trychnopalpa fornacaria, which is found in South Africa.

The wingspan is 12–14 mm. The forewings are brown, with the markings dark grey or fuscous irrorated (sprinkled) with black. The basal third is irregularly and suffusedly spotted, and on the dorsum wholly suffused with blackish, the middle third of the dorsum is suffused with dark grey. The stigmata are moderately large and black, the plical beneath the first discal, the second discal resting on an irregular dark tornal blotch, a triangular costal blotch above this. There are some suffused spots around the posterior part of the costa and termen, sometimes suffused into an apical patch. The hindwings are grey, paler anteriorly.
