= Diprotochaeta =

Scientific classification
- Domain: Eukaryota
- Kingdom: Animalia
- Phylum: Arthropoda
- Class: Insecta
- Order: Lepidoptera
- Family: Gelechiidae
- Subfamily: Gelechiinae
- Genus: Diprotochaeta; Diakonoff, 1941
- Species: D. fallax

Binomial name
- Diprotochaeta fallax Diakonoff, 1941

Genus of moths

Diprotochaeta is a genus of moths in the family Gelechiidae. It contains the species Diprotochaeta fallax, which is found in Indonesia (Java).
