= Bruchiana =

Scientific classification
- Domain: Eukaryota
- Kingdom: Animalia
- Phylum: Arthropoda
- Class: Insecta
- Order: Lepidoptera
- Family: Gelechiidae
- Subfamily: Gelechiinae
- Genus: Bruchiana; Jörgensen, 1916
- Species: B. cassiaella

Binomial name
- Bruchiana cassiaella Jörgensen, 1916

Genus of moths

Bruchiana is a genus of moth in the family Gelechiidae. It contains the species Bruchiana cassiaella, which is found in Argentina.

The wingspan is about 19 mm.
