= Pachygeneia =

Scientific classification
- Domain: Eukaryota
- Kingdom: Animalia
- Phylum: Arthropoda
- Class: Insecta
- Order: Lepidoptera
- Family: Gelechiidae
- Genus: Pachygeneia; Meyrick, 1923
- Species: P. clitellaria

Binomial name
- Pachygeneia clitellaria Meyrick, 1923

Synonyms
- Gnorimoschema oxyloba Meyrick, 1929

Genus of moths

Pachygeneia is a genus of moth in the family Gelechiidae. It contains the species Pachygeneia clitellaria, which is found in Brazil (Amazonas) and Peru.

The wingspan is 8–10 mm. The forewings are rather dark grey, variably irrorated or largely suffused whitish, sometimes with a transverse streak of blackish-grey irroration towards the base. There are ochreous fasciate blotches from the costa at the middle and three-fourths, reaching half across the wing or beyond, more or less suffused with blackish irroration on the margins and on the costa, with large subdorsal tufts of blackish irroration forming continuations of these. There is also an ochreous streak from four-fifths of the costa to the apex, with some blackish irroration around it, and a black apical mark. The hindwings are grey.
