= Furcaphora =

Scientific classification
- Kingdom: Animalia
- Phylum: Arthropoda
- Class: Insecta
- Order: Lepidoptera
- Family: Gelechiidae
- Subfamily: Gelechiinae
- Genus: Furcaphora; Janse, 1958
- Species: F. caelata

Binomial name
- Furcaphora caelata (Meyrick, 1913)

Synonyms
- Telphusa caelata Meyrick, 1913; Gelechia triscelis Meyrick, 1917

Genus of moths

Furcaphora is a genus of moths in the family Gelechiidae. It contains the species Furcaphora caelata, which is found in South Africa.

The wingspan is about 17 mm. The forewings are ochreous-white with the black markings and an oblique irregular fascia from the basal portion of the costa to dorsum before the middle, constricted in the disc, triangularly dilated on the dorsum. There is a flattened-triangular patch on the costa before the middle and an irregular inwardly oblique fascia from the costa beyond the middle reaching two-thirds across the wing, from the middle of the posterior edge sending a narrow bar to the tornus. There is a spot on the termen below the middle just touching the tornal bar, and one on the costa before the apex. The hindwings are ochreous-whitish tinged with grey towards the costa posteriorly.
