= Holcophoroides =

Scientific classification
- Kingdom: Animalia
- Phylum: Arthropoda
- Clade: Pancrustacea
- Class: Insecta
- Order: Lepidoptera
- Family: Gelechiidae
- Subfamily: Gelechiinae
- Genus: Holcophoroides; Matsumura, 1931
- Species: H. nigripes

Binomial name
- Holcophoroides nigripes Matsumura, 1931

Genus of moths

Holcophoroides is a genus of moths in the family Gelechiidae. It contains the species Holcophoroides nigripes, which is found in Japan.
