= Batenia =

Scientific classification
- Domain: Eukaryota
- Kingdom: Animalia
- Phylum: Arthropoda
- Class: Insecta
- Order: Lepidoptera
- Family: Gelechiidae
- Subfamily: Gelechiinae
- Genus: Batenia; Chrétien, 1908
- Species: B. fasciella

Binomial name
- Batenia fasciella Chrétien, 1908

Genus of moths

Batenia is a genus of moth in the family Gelechiidae. It contains the species Batenia fasciella, which is found in Algeria.

The wingspan is about 8.5 mm. The forewings are white, with two transverse bands. The hindwings are grey.
