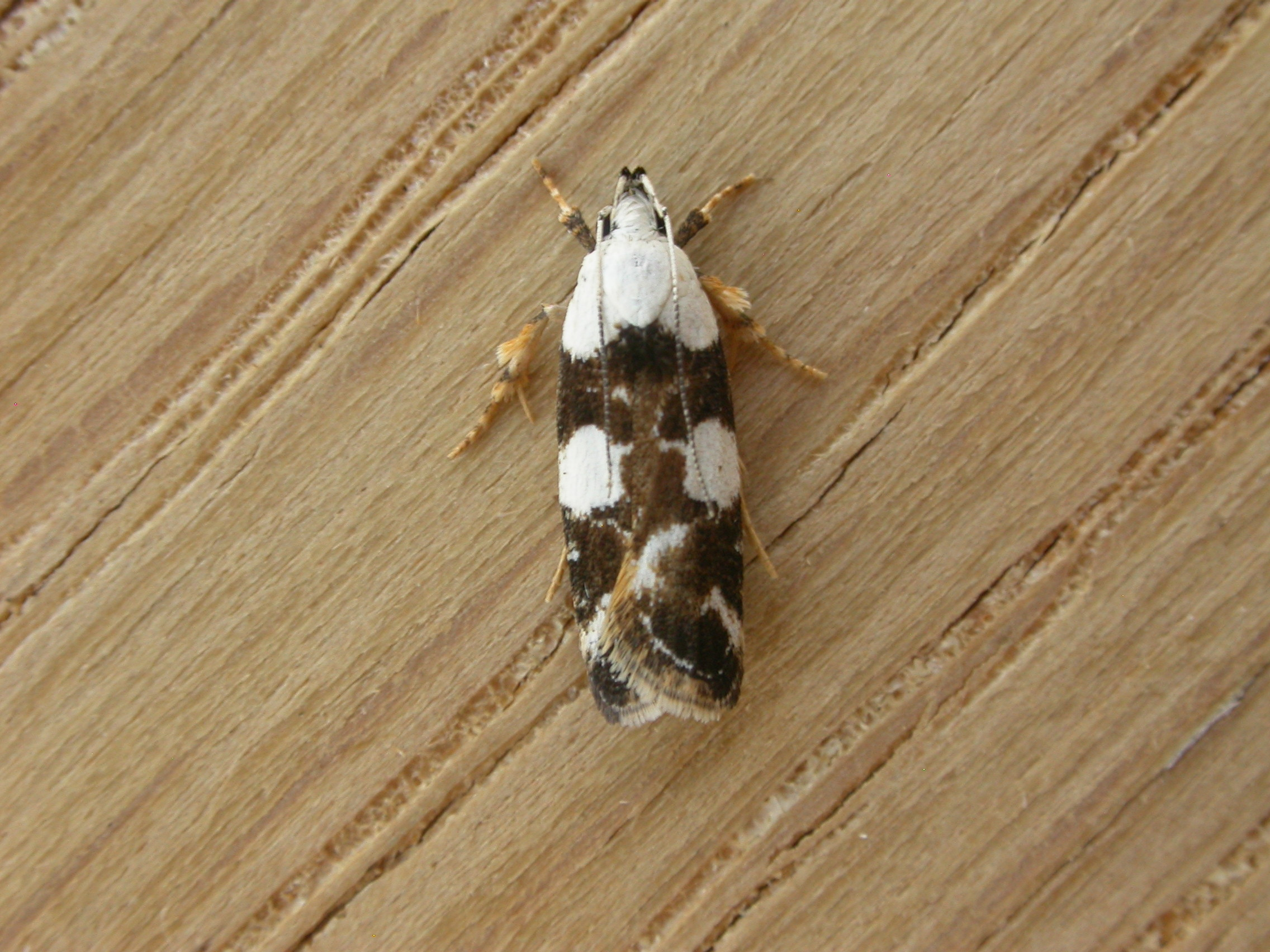

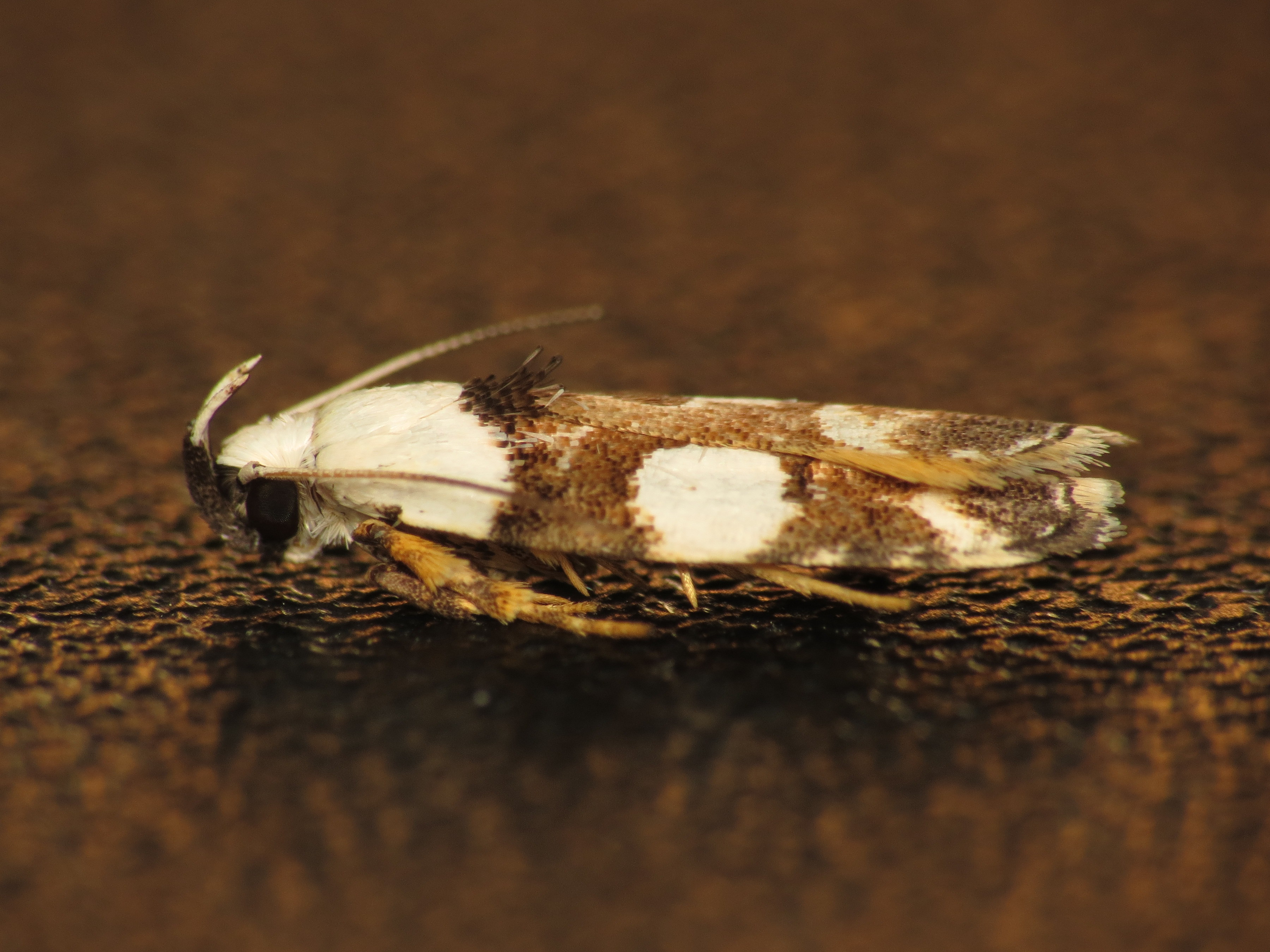

Scientific classification
- Kingdom: Animalia
- Phylum: Arthropoda
- Class: Insecta
- Order: Lepidoptera
- Family: Gelechiidae
- Subfamily: Gelechiinae
- Genus: Orthoptila; Meyrick, 1904
- Species: O. euopa

Binomial name
- Orthoptila euopa (Walker, 1864)

Synonyms
- Oecophora abruptella Walker, 1864; Gelechia triforella Zeller, 1877

= Orthoptila =

Genus of moths

Orthoptila is a genus of moth in the family Gelechiidae. It contains the species Orthoptila abruptella, which is found in Australia, where it has been recorded from Queensland, New South Wales, the Australian Capital Territory, Tasmania and South Australia.

The wingspan is 12–15 mm (0.47–0.59 in). The forewings are ochreous-brown, irrorated with dark fuscous or blackish and with a moderate white basal patch, the outer edge rounded. There are two or three undefined white dots on the fold and a broad white transverse blotch from the middle of the costa, reaching more than half across the wing, sometimes much mixed with ground colour. An irregular suffused white streak is found from the disc beyond this to the tornus, where it coalesces with an irregular white subterminal streak, sometimes interrupted. The hindwings are pale ochreous-yellowish, the terminal half fuscous and the division irregular and suffused.
