= Harmatitis =

Scientific classification
- Kingdom: Animalia
- Phylum: Arthropoda
- Class: Insecta
- Order: Lepidoptera
- Family: Gelechiidae
- Subfamily: Gelechiinae
- Genus: Harmatitis; Meyrick, 1910
- Species: H. sphecopa

Binomial name
- Harmatitis sphecopa Meyrick, 1910

Synonyms
- Gelechia sphecopa (Meyrick, 1910); Gelechia eucerella Walker, 1864; Lecithocera hippotarcha Meyrick, 1923

Genus of moths

Harmatitis is a genus of moths in the family Gelechiidae. It contains only one species, Harmatitis sphecopa, which is found in Sri Lanka.

The wingspan is 17–18 mm. The forewings are dark purple-fuscous with the costal edge ochreous-orange from about one-fifth to four-fifths. There is an irregular transverse ochreous-orange spot on the costa before the middle, reaching half across the wing. There is also a narrow ochreous-orange spot along the costa about three-fourths and a group of a few pale ochreous scales above the tornus. The hindwings are dark fuscous, with golden-bronze and purplish reflections.
