= Metaplatyntis =

Scientific classification
- Domain: Eukaryota
- Kingdom: Animalia
- Phylum: Arthropoda
- Class: Insecta
- Order: Lepidoptera
- Family: Gelechiidae
- Subfamily: Gelechiinae
- Genus: Metaplatyntis; Meyrick, 1938
- Species: M. synclepta

Binomial name
- Metaplatyntis synclepta Meyrick, 1938

Genus of moths

Metaplatyntis is a genus of moth in the family Gelechiidae. It contains the species Metaplatyntis synclepta, which is found in the Democratic Republic of Congo, where it has been recorded from North Kivu.
