= Tritadelpha =

Scientific classification
- Domain: Eukaryota
- Kingdom: Animalia
- Phylum: Arthropoda
- Class: Insecta
- Order: Lepidoptera
- Family: Gelechiidae
- Subfamily: Gelechiinae
- Genus: Tritadelpha; Meyrick, 1904
- Species: T. microptila

Binomial name
- Tritadelpha microptila Meyrick, 1904

Genus of moths

Tritadelpha is a genus of moth in the family Gelechiidae. It contains the species Tritadelpha microptila, which is found in Australia, where it has been recorded from Queensland.

The wingspan is 7–8 mm (0.28–0.31 in). The forewings are white, more or less irrorated with brown or dark fuscous on the posterior half and with two short very oblique dark fuscous marks from the costa before and beyond the middle, and a third at three-fourths stronger and continued to the apex. There is a fuscous blotch, suffused with dark fuscous on the fold and towards the dorsum, extending along the dorsum from the base to near the tornus, broadest in the middle and reaching half across the wing, irregularly narrowed to a point posteriorly. There is some irregular dark fuscous suffusion above the tornus. The hindwings are pale grey, darker posteriorly.
