= Ischnophenax =

Scientific classification
- Domain: Eukaryota
- Kingdom: Animalia
- Phylum: Arthropoda
- Class: Insecta
- Order: Lepidoptera
- Family: Gelechiidae
- Subfamily: Gelechiinae
- Genus: Ischnophenax; Meyrick, 1931
- Species: I. streblopis

Binomial name
- Ischnophenax streblopis Meyrick, 1931

Genus of moths

Ischnophenax is a genus of moth in the family Gelechiidae. It contains the species Ischnophenax streblopis, which is found in India.
