= Tiranimia =

Scientific classification
- Domain: Eukaryota
- Kingdom: Animalia
- Phylum: Arthropoda
- Class: Insecta
- Order: Lepidoptera
- Family: Gelechiidae
- Subfamily: Gelechiinae
- Genus: Tiranimia; Chrétien, 1915
- Species: T. epidolella

Binomial name
- Tiranimia epidolella Chrétien, 1915

Genus of moths

Tiranimia is a genus of moth in the family Gelechiidae. It contains the species Tiranimia epidolella, which is found in Tunisia.
