= Gambrostola =

Scientific classification
- Kingdom: Animalia
- Phylum: Arthropoda
- Class: Insecta
- Order: Lepidoptera
- Family: Gelechiidae
- Subfamily: Gelechiinae
- Genus: Gambrostola; Meyrick, 1926
- Species: G. imposita

Binomial name
- Gambrostola imposita Meyrick, 1926

Genus of moths

Gambrostola is a genus of moths in the family Gelechiidae. It contains the species Gambrostola imposita, which is found in South Africa.
