= Haplovalva =

Scientific classification
- Kingdom: Animalia
- Phylum: Arthropoda
- Class: Insecta
- Order: Lepidoptera
- Family: Gelechiidae
- Subfamily: Gelechiinae
- Genus: Haplovalva; Janse, 1958
- Species: H. ametris

Binomial name
- Haplovalva ametris (Meyrick, 1921)

Synonyms
- Gelechia ametris Meyrick, 1921

Genus of moths

Haplovalva is a monotypic moth genus in the family Gelechiidae erected by Anthonie Johannes Theodorus Janse in 1958. Its only species, Haplovalva ametris, was first described by Edward Meyrick in 1921. It is found in South Africa.

The wingspan is about 18 mm. The forewings are pale ochreous, somewhat sprinkled with fuscous, suffused towards the costa anteriorly with brownish, and towards the costa posteriorly and termen with grey, more or less streaked between the veins with dark fuscous. The stigmata are represented by small ochreous-white dots, the discal placed on a ferruginous-brown streak continued beneath vein six, the first discal extended as an irregular mark anteriorly, the plical very obliquely before the first discal. There are cloudy blackish dots on the extremities of the intraneural streaks, two above and two below the apex preceded by ochreous-white marks. The hindwings are grey, but paler anteriorly.
