= Lophaeola =

Scientific classification
- Domain: Eukaryota
- Kingdom: Animalia
- Phylum: Arthropoda
- Class: Insecta
- Order: Lepidoptera
- Family: Gelechiidae
- Subfamily: Gelechiinae
- Genus: Lophaeola; Meyrick, 1932
- Species: L. inquinata

Binomial name
- Lophaeola inquinata Meyrick, 1932

Genus of moths

Lophaeola is a genus of moths in the family Gelechiidae. It contains the species Lophaeola inquinata, which is found in Brazil.
