= Irenidora =

Scientific classification
- Kingdom: Animalia
- Phylum: Arthropoda
- Class: Insecta
- Order: Lepidoptera
- Family: Gelechiidae
- Subfamily: Gelechiinae
- Genus: Irenidora; Meyrick in Caradja & Meyrick, 1938
- Species: I. serenisca

Binomial name
- Irenidora serenisca Meyrick, 1938

Genus of moths

Irenidora is a genus of moths in the family Gelechiidae. It contains the species Irenidora serenisca, which is found in China (Yunnan).
