= Metabolaea =

Scientific classification
- Domain: Eukaryota
- Kingdom: Animalia
- Phylum: Arthropoda
- Class: Insecta
- Order: Lepidoptera
- Family: Gelechiidae
- Subfamily: Gelechiinae
- Genus: Metabolaea; Meyrick, 1923
- Species: M. chlorophthalma

Binomial name
- Metabolaea chlorophthalma Meyrick, 1923

Genus of moths

Metabolaea is a genus of moth in the family Gelechiidae. It contains the species Metabolaea chlorophthalma, which is found in Brazil.

The wingspan is 14–15 mm. The forewings are light grey closely and finely speckled white with some scattered black scales and a tuft of blackish and white scales beneath the fold at one-third, some black scales tending to form a line along the fold towards this. There are two pale ochreous tufts surrounded with blackish and white scales transversely placed in the disc at two-thirds and a fine black longitudinal line from between these to the termen more or less indicated. There are also indistinct blackish marginal dots around the posterior part of the costa and termen. The hindwings are grey-whitish, thinly scaled and suffused grey posteriorly.
