= Crambodoxa =

Scientific classification
- Kingdom: Animalia
- Phylum: Arthropoda
- Class: Insecta
- Order: Lepidoptera
- Family: Gelechiidae
- Genus: Crambodoxa; Meyrick, 1913
- Species: C. platyaula

Binomial name
- Crambodoxa platyaula Meyrick, 1913

Genus of moths

Crambodoxa is a genus of moths in the family Gelechiidae. It contains the species Crambodoxa platyaula, which is found in Colombia.

The wingspan is about 23 mm. The forewings are brownish, the dorsum and anterior half of the costa suffused with darker brown and with a broad silvery-white supra-median streak from the base to the apex, edged beneath with blackish-brown, the lower edge angular-prominent in the middle, where a streak of blackish-brown suffusion runs to the tornus. The hindwings are grey.
