= Bactropaltis =

Scientific classification
- Kingdom: Animalia
- Phylum: Arthropoda
- Class: Insecta
- Order: Lepidoptera
- Family: Gelechiidae
- Subfamily: Gelechiinae
- Genus: Bactropaltis; Meyrick, 1939
- Species: B. lithosema

Binomial name
- Bactropaltis lithosema Meyrick, 1939

Genus of moths

Bactropaltis is a genus of moth in the family Gelechiidae. It contains the species Bactropaltis lithosema, which is found in the Central African Republic.
