= Glycerophthora =

Scientific classification
- Kingdom: Animalia
- Phylum: Arthropoda
- Class: Insecta
- Order: Lepidoptera
- Family: Gelechiidae
- Subfamily: Gelechiinae
- Genus: Glycerophthora; Meyrick, 1935
- Species: G. clavicularis

Binomial name
- Glycerophthora clavicularis Meyrick, 1935

Genus of moths

Glycerophthora is a genus of moths in the family Gelechiidae. It contains the species Glycerophthora clavicularis, which is found in Malaysia.

The larvae feed on Garcinia mangostana. Pupation takes place in a white silken cocoon.
