= Flexiptera =

Scientific classification
- Kingdom: Animalia
- Phylum: Arthropoda
- Class: Insecta
- Order: Lepidoptera
- Family: Gelechiidae
- Subfamily: Gelechiinae
- Genus: Flexiptera; Janse, 1958
- Species: F. revoluta

Binomial name
- Flexiptera revoluta (Meyrick, 1918)

Synonyms
- Gelechia revoluta Meyrick, 1918

Genus of moths

Flexiptera is a monotypic moth genus in the family Gelechiidae erected by Anthonie Johannes Theodorus Janse in 1958. Its only species, Flexiptera revoluta, was first described by Edward Meyrick in 1918. It is found in South Africa.

The wingspan is 10–11 mm. The forewings are whitish, irregularly and variably irrorated (sprinkled) with grey. The basal area is suffused with pale ochreous and there is a blackish spot at the base of the costa, as well as elongate blackish blotches on the costa at about one-fifth and the dorsum before the middle, more or less connected posteriorly by an oblique blackish blotch in the disc. There is an elongate blackish blotch on the costa before the middle, beneath which is a round pale ochreous spot. The stigmata are black, ringed with pale ochreous, the plical slightly before the first discal. There is also a blackish spot on the costa above the second discal stigma, and a more or less developed blackish blotch on the dorsum beneath and connected with it. The apical area is suffused with pale ochreous and there are some cloudy black dots on the posterior part of the costa and termen. The hindwings are grey.
