= Symphanactis =

Scientific classification
- Kingdom: Animalia
- Phylum: Arthropoda
- Class: Insecta
- Order: Lepidoptera
- Family: Gelechiidae
- Genus: Symphanactis; Meyrick, 1925
- Species: S. hetaera

Binomial name
- Symphanactis hetaera (Meyrick, 1914)

Synonyms
- Ptocheuusa hetaera Meyrick, 1914

Genus of moths

Symphanactis is a genus of moth in the family Gelechiidae. It contains the species Symphanactis hetaera, which is found in Guyana.

The wingspan is 6–7 mm. The forewings are grey with very oblique white strigulae from the costa about one-fourth and the middle, as well as a very inwards-oblique whitish strigula from the dorsum before the tornus, and a longitudinal one in the disc above this. There is a round orange patch in the disc at three-fourths, touching the discal and second costal strigulae. An oblique white strigula is found from the costa at three-fourths, connected with a white dot on the termen beneath it by a blue-leaden mark. There is also a white dot on the termen beyond this, and two on the costa towards the apex, as well as a round black apical dot. The hindwings are grey.
