= Meridorma =

Scientific classification
- Domain: Eukaryota
- Kingdom: Animalia
- Phylum: Arthropoda
- Class: Insecta
- Order: Lepidoptera
- Family: Gelechiidae
- Subfamily: Gelechiinae
- Genus: Meridorma; Meyrick, 1925
- Species: M. thrombodes

Binomial name
- Meridorma thrombodes (Meyrick, 1914)

Synonyms
- Ptocheuusa thrombodes Meyrick, 1914

Genus of moths

Meridorma is a genus of moth in the family Gelechiidae. It contains the species Meridorma thrombodes, which is found in Guyana.

The wingspan is 6–7 mm. The forewings are blackish with three blackish spots on the costa near the base, at one-third, and two-thirds, and three in the disc obliquely beyond these respectively, the last two discal elongate, the last largest. There is a blackish dot on the fold before the second discal spot, and a cloudy spot on the tornus, as well as a small cloudy black apical spot, and sometimes a dot on the costa above it. The hindwings are rather dark grey, thinly scaled in disc.
