= Drepanoterma =

Scientific classification
- Kingdom: Animalia
- Phylum: Arthropoda
- Clade: Pancrustacea
- Class: Insecta
- Order: Lepidoptera
- Family: Gelechiidae
- Subfamily: Gelechiinae
- Genus: Drepanoterma; Walsingham, 1897
- Species: D. lacticaudellum

Binomial name
- Drepanoterma lacticaudellum Walsingham, 1897

Genus of moths

Drepanoterma is a genus of moths in the family Gelechiidae. It contains the species Drepanoterma lacticaudellum, which is found in the West Indies, where it has been recorded from Grenada.

The wingspan is about 12 mm. The forewings are shining ferruginous, the basal third transversely blotched and striated with dark purplish fuscous and dark ferruginous, the apex and termen also shaded with dark purplish fuscous and illuminated with steel-grey patches. The hindwings are dark coppery grey with iridescent reflections at the base of the cell.
