= Dolerotricha =

Scientific classification
- Kingdom: Animalia
- Phylum: Arthropoda
- Class: Insecta
- Order: Lepidoptera
- Family: Gelechiidae
- Subfamily: Gelechiinae
- Genus: Dolerotricha; Meyrick, 1925
- Species: D. flabellifer

Binomial name
- Dolerotricha flabellifer (Rebel, 1896)

Synonyms
- Nothris flabellifer Rebel, 1896

Genus of moths

Dolerotricha is a genus of moths in the family Gelechiidae. It contains the species Dolerotricha flabellifer, which is found in Morocco.

The wingspan is about 13 mm. The forewings are ochreous-yellow with blackish-grey streaks. The hindwings are shining light grey.
