= Melitoxestis =

Scientific classification
- Domain: Eukaryota
- Kingdom: Animalia
- Phylum: Arthropoda
- Class: Insecta
- Order: Lepidoptera
- Family: Gelechiidae
- Subfamily: Gelechiinae
- Genus: Melitoxestis; Meyrick, 1921
- Species: M. centrotypa

Binomial name
- Melitoxestis centrotypa Meyrick, 1921

Genus of moths

Melitoxestis is a monotypic moth genus in the family Gelechiidae. Its only species, Melitoxestis centrotypa, is found in Zimbabwe. Both the genus and species were first described by Edward Meyrick in 1927.

The wingspan is about 15 mm. The forewings are yellow ochreous suffused with light grey except along the costa and speckled with grey. The costa is suffused with grey towards the base. The first discal stigma is black and conspicuous, while the second is almost obsolete, only indicated by one or two scales. The hindwings are dark grey.
