= Thriophora =

Scientific classification
- Kingdom: Animalia
- Phylum: Arthropoda
- Clade: Pancrustacea
- Class: Insecta
- Order: Lepidoptera
- Family: Gelechiidae
- Subfamily: Gelechiinae
- Genus: Thriophora; Meyrick, 1911
- Species: T. ovulata

Binomial name
- Thriophora ovulata Meyrick, 1911

Genus of moths

Thriophora is a genus of moth in the family Gelechiidae. It contains the species Thriophora ovulata, which is found in South Africa (Gauteng).

The wingspan is about 12 mm. The forewings are ochreous-white, sprinkled with black points and with a rather large suffused roundish ferruginous-ochreous spot sprinkled with black in the disc at one-fifth. There are three similar spots representing the stigmata, the plical slightly before the first discal, much more irrorated with black than the others. There is also a similarly coloured terminal fascia, broadest towards the costa. Some slight irregular pale ferruginous-ochreous suffusion is scattered elsewhere about the disc. The hindwings are ochreous-whitish.
