= Belovalva =

Scientific classification
- Domain: Eukaryota
- Kingdom: Animalia
- Phylum: Arthropoda
- Class: Insecta
- Order: Lepidoptera
- Family: Gelechiidae
- Subfamily: Gelechiinae
- Genus: Belovalva; Janse, 1963
- Species: B. nigripuncta

Binomial name
- Belovalva nigripuncta Janse, 1963

Genus of moths

Belovalva is a genus of moths in the family Gelechiidae. It contains the species Belovalva nigripuncta, which is found in South Africa and Zimbabwe.
