= Glauce pectenalaeella =

Scientific classification
- Domain: Eukaryota
- Kingdom: Animalia
- Phylum: Arthropoda
- Class: Insecta
- Order: Lepidoptera
- Family: Gelechiidae
- Subfamily: Gelechiinae
- Tribe: Litini
- Genus: Glauce; Chambers, 1875
- Species: G. pectenalaeella

Binomial name
- Glauce pectenalaeella Chambers, 1875

Species of moth

Glauce is a genus of moths in the family Gelechiidae. It contains only one species, Glauce pectenalaeella, which is found in North America, where it has been recorded from Alabama, Arkansas, Florida, Illinois, Indiana, Kentucky, Louisiana, Maine, Mississippi, Quebec, South Carolina, Tennessee, Texas and West Virginia.

The ground color is pale yellowish, almost entirely obscured by dense fuscous dusting and fuscous spots. The apex of the forewings is more deeply fuscous.
