= Homotima =

Scientific classification
- Domain: Eukaryota
- Kingdom: Animalia
- Phylum: Arthropoda
- Class: Insecta
- Order: Lepidoptera
- Family: Gelechiidae
- Subfamily: Gelechiinae
- Genus: Homotima; Diakonoff, 1954
- Species: H. purpurata

Binomial name
- Homotima purpurata Diakonoff, 1954

Genus of moths

Homotima is a genus of moth in the family Gelechiidae. It contains the species Homotima purpurata, which is found in New Guinea.
