= Pavolechia =

Scientific classification
- Domain: Eukaryota
- Kingdom: Animalia
- Phylum: Arthropoda
- Class: Insecta
- Order: Lepidoptera
- Family: Gelechiidae
- Subfamily: Gelechiinae
- Genus: Pavolechia; Busck, 1914
- Species: P. argentea

Binomial name
- Pavolechia argentea Busck, 1914

Synonyms
- Desmaucha Meyrick, 1918; Desmaucha chrysostoma Meyrick, 1918

Genus of moths

Pavolechia is a genus of moth in the family Gelechiidae. It contains the species Pavolechia argentea, which is found in Panama and Guyana.

The wingspan is about 11 mm. The forewings are dark blackish brown with a bright, bluish metallic sheen and with a round, silvery white dot on the cell and an oblong, silvery white dash at the end of the cell. The hindwings are blackish brown with a large silvery white spot on the middle of costa and a somewhat smaller similar spot just below it on the dorsal edge.
