= Tahla zadiella =

Scientific classification
- Domain: Eukaryota
- Kingdom: Animalia
- Phylum: Arthropoda
- Class: Insecta
- Order: Lepidoptera
- Family: Gelechiidae
- Subfamily: Gelechiinae
- Genus: Tahla; Dumont, 1932
- Species: T. zadiella

Binomial name
- Tahla zadiella Dumont, 1932

Species of moth

Tahla is a monotypic moth genus in the family Gelechiidae. Its only species, Tahla zadiella, is found in Tunisia. Both the genus and the species were first described by Constantin Dumont in 1932.
