= List of gelechiid genera: S =

The large moth family Gelechiidae contains the following genera:

- Sarotorna
- Satrapodoxa
- Sattleria
- Sautereopsis
- Schistonoea
- Schistophila
- Schistovalva
- Schizovalva
- Schmidtnielsenia
- Schneidereria
- Scindalmota
- Sclerocecis
- Sclerocopa
- Sclerograptis
- Sclerophantis
- Scodes
- Scrobipalpa
- Scrobipalpoides
- Scrobipalpomima
- Scrobipalpula
- Scrobipalpuloides
- Scrobischema
- Scrobitasta
- Scythostola
- Semnostoma
- Semocharista
- Semophylax
- Sicera
- Siderea
- Simoneura
- Sinevia
- Sinoe
- Sitotroga
- Smenodoca
- Sophronia
- Sorotacta
- Spermanthrax
- Sphagiocrates
- Sphaleractis
- Sphenocrates
- Sphenogrypa
- Sriferia
- Stachyostoma
- Stagmaturgis
- Stegasta
- Stenoalata
- Stenolechia
- Stenolechiodes
- Stenovalva
- Steremniodes
- Stereodmeta
- Stereomita
- Sterrhostoma
- Stibarenches
- Stigmatoptera
- Stomopteryx
- Streniastis
- Strenophila
- Streyella
- Strobisia
- Struempelia
- Symbatica
- Symbolistis
- Symmetrischema
- Symmetrischemulum
- Symphanactis
- Synactias
- Syncathedra
- Syncopacma
- Syncratomorpha
- Syndesmica
- Syngelechia
- Syngenomictis
- Syringopais
- Syrmadaula
- Systasiota
