= Scrobipalpomima obscuroides =

Scientific classification
- Kingdom: Animalia
- Phylum: Arthropoda
- Clade: Pancrustacea
- Class: Insecta
- Order: Lepidoptera
- Family: Gelechiidae
- Subfamily: Gelechiinae
- Tribe: Gnorimoschemini
- Genus: Scrobipalpomima
- Species: S. obscuroides

Binomial name
- Scrobipalpomima obscuroides Povolný, 1989

Species of moth

Scrobipalpomima obscuroides is a moth belonging to the family Gelechiidae. It was described by Povolný in 1989 and is found in Argentina.

== See also ==
- Scrobipalpomima
- Scrobipalpomima neuquenensis Povolný, 1985
- Scrobipalpomima improbabilis Povolný, 1989
- Scrobipalpomima karsholti Povolný, 1985
- Scrobipalpomima fugitiva Povolný, 1989
- Scrobipalpomima elongata Povolný, 1989
- Scrobipalpomima patagoniae Povolný, 1985
- Scrobipalpomima anonyma Povolný, 1985
- Scrobipalpomima schematica Povolný, 1985
- Scrobipalpomima excellens Povolný, 1985
- Scrobipalpomima grisescens Povolný, 1985
- Scrobipalpomima illustris Povolný, 1989
- Scrobipalpomima indifferens Povolný, 1985
- Scrobipalpomima obsoleta Povolný, 1985
- Scrobipalpomima obtusa Povolný, 1989
- Scrobipalpomima patens Povolný, 1985
- Scrobipalpomima pseudogrisescens Povolný, 1989
- Scrobipalpomima relicta Povolný, 1985
- Scrobipalpomima septemptrionalis Povolný, 1990
- Scrobipalpomima serena Povolný, 1989
- Scrobipalpomima symmetrischemoides Povolný, 1989
- Scrobipalpomima triangulignathos Povolný, 1985
- Scrobipalpomima questionaria Povolný, 1985
- Scrobipalpomima addenda Povolný, 1989
- Scrobipalpomima concurrens Povolný, 1989
