= Sinoe capsana =

Scientific classification
- Domain: Eukaryota
- Kingdom: Animalia
- Phylum: Arthropoda
- Class: Insecta
- Order: Lepidoptera
- Family: Gelechiidae
- Genus: Sinoe
- Species: S. capsana

Binomial name
- Sinoe capsana Lee & Brambila, 2012

Species of moth

Sinoe capsana is a moth of the family Gelechiidae. It is found in North America, where it has been recorded from southern Florida.

The length of the forewings is 7–8 mm. Adults have been recorded on wing from December to July.

== Etymology ==
The species name refers to the Florida CAPS program, which ran a survey for the tomato leaf miner in Florida, which resulted in the discovery of this species.
