= Plocamosaris pandora =

Scientific classification
- Kingdom: Animalia
- Phylum: Arthropoda
- Class: Insecta
- Order: Lepidoptera
- Family: Gelechiidae
- Genus: Plocamosaris
- Species: P. pandora

Binomial name
- Plocamosaris pandora Meyrick, 1912

Synonyms
- Dichomeris pandora Meyrick, 1912

Species of moth

Plocamosaris pandora is a moth in the family Gelechiidae. It was described by Edward Meyrick in 1912. It is found in Rio de Janeiro, Brazil.

The wingspan is about 20 mm. The forewings are ferruginous ochreous, tinged with brownish, deepest towards the costal sinuation. The second discal stigma is obscurely brown, with a transverse streak of brownish suffusion immediately before the termen. The hindwings are pale ochreous yellow.
