= Besciva longitudinella =

Scientific classification
- Domain: Eukaryota
- Kingdom: Animalia
- Phylum: Arthropoda
- Class: Insecta
- Order: Lepidoptera
- Family: Gelechiidae
- Genus: Besciva
- Species: B. longitudinella

Binomial name
- Besciva longitudinella Busck, 1914

Species of moth

Besciva longitudinella is a moth in the family Gelechiidae. It was described by August Busck in 1914. It is found in Panama.

The wingspan is about 9 mm. The forewings are white, strongly overlaid by light ochreous brown and black scales and with a nearly continuous, longitudinal, undulating line running through the middle of the wing from the base to the apex, bordered above with pure white. Another black longitudinal line covers the basal four-fifths of the fold. The rest of the wing is ochreous brown, with the costal edge slightly dusted with black. The hindwings are blackish fuscous.
