= Plocamosaris auritogata =

Scientific classification
- Domain: Eukaryota
- Kingdom: Animalia
- Phylum: Arthropoda
- Class: Insecta
- Order: Lepidoptera
- Family: Gelechiidae
- Genus: Plocamosaris
- Species: P. auritogata

Binomial name
- Plocamosaris auritogata (Walsingham, 1911)

Synonyms
- Noeza auritogata Walsingham, 1911; Dichomeris auritogata; Noeza pyropis Meyrick, 1918; Dichomeris pyropis

Species of moth

Plocamosaris auritogata is a moth in the family Gelechiidae. It was described by Thomas de Grey in 1911. It is found in Panama, French Guiana and Brazil.

The wingspan is about 21 mm. The forewings are reddish chestnut, with a patch of reddish ochreous, slightly raised scales on either side of the fold at about one-fourth and a small dark chestnut spot at the end of the cell, as well as an elongate transverse dark chestnut shade, separated from the termen by a shining lilac marginal line, which is widened upward to the apex, where it is diffused and diluted inward over the wing-surface, at least as far as the upper angle of the cell. The hindwings are golden-yellow.
