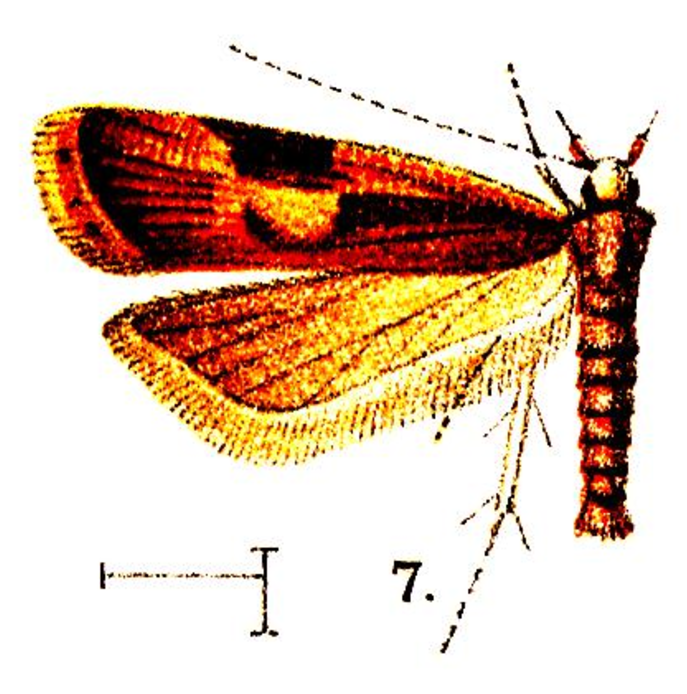
- E. oncotera ♂.

Scientific classification
- Domain: Eukaryota
- Kingdom: Animalia
- Phylum: Arthropoda
- Class: Insecta
- Order: Lepidoptera
- Family: Gelechiidae
- Genus: Eunebristis
- Species: E. oncotera

Binomial name
- Eunebristis oncotera (Walsingham, 1911)

Synonyms
- Noeza oncotera Walsingham, 1911

= Eunebristis oncotera =

Species of moth

Eunebristis oncotera is a moth in the family Gelechiidae. It was described by Walsingham in 1911. It is found in Mexico (Guerrero).

The wingspan is about 11 mm. The forewings are pale yellowish ochreous, suffused with ferruginous towards the termen, and in a large blotch extending from the base on either side of the fold and along the dorsum to the commencement of the tornal cilia, its outer extremity somewhat attenuate, leaving a space of the same ground colour between it and a dark ferruginous costal blotch a little beyond the middle. The termen is narrowly pale yellowish ochreous, with three ferruginous dots at the base of the cilia. The hindwings are shining, pale grey.
