= Sriferia cockerella =

Scientific classification
- Kingdom: Animalia
- Phylum: Arthropoda
- Clade: Pancrustacea
- Class: Insecta
- Order: Lepidoptera
- Family: Gelechiidae
- Genus: Sriferia
- Species: S. cockerella

Binomial name
- Sriferia cockerella (Busck, 1903)

Synonyms
- Aristotelia cockerella Busck, 1903

Species of moth

Sriferia cockerella is a moth of the family Gelechiidae. It was described by August Busck in 1903. It is found in North America, where it has been recorded from California, Arizona, New Mexico and Texas.

The wingspan is 11.5–12.5 mm. The basal two-thirds of the forewings are light yellow, while the apical third is dark purplish brown with a slight touch of yellow on the costal edge before the apex. The limit between these two colors is oblique and sharply drawn, forming a straight line from the beginning of the costal cilia obliquely inward to apical two-fifths of the dorsal edge, the yellow reaching further outward at the costa and the brown reaching further inward at the dorsal edge. On the dividing line between the two colors is an oblique row of three circular metallic golden spots edged with deep black. The hindwings are shining bluish black.
