= Harpagidia mauricaudella =

Scientific classification
- Domain: Eukaryota
- Kingdom: Animalia
- Phylum: Arthropoda
- Class: Insecta
- Order: Lepidoptera
- Family: Gelechiidae
- Genus: Harpagidia
- Species: H. mauricaudella

Binomial name
- Harpagidia mauricaudella (Oberthür, 1888)

Synonyms
- Tachyptilia mauricaudella Oberthür, 1888

Species of moth

Harpagidia mauricaudella is a moth in the family Gelechiidae. It was described by Oberthür in 1888. It is found in Algeria.
