= Rhadinophylla =

Scientific classification
- Domain: Eukaryota
- Kingdom: Animalia
- Phylum: Arthropoda
- Class: Insecta
- Order: Lepidoptera
- Family: Gelechiidae
- Subfamily: Dichomeridinae
- Genus: Rhadinophylla; Turner, 1919

Genus of moths

Rhadinophylla is a genus of moths in the family Gelechiidae.

== Species ==
- Rhadinophylla siderosema Turner, 1919
