= Arotria iophaea =

Scientific classification
- Kingdom: Animalia
- Phylum: Arthropoda
- Class: Insecta
- Order: Lepidoptera
- Family: Gelechiidae
- Genus: Arotria
- Species: A. iophaea

Binomial name
- Arotria iophaea Meyrick, 1904

Synonyms
- Dichomeris iophaea

Species of moth

Arotria iophaea is a moth in the family Gelechiidae. It was described by Edward Meyrick in 1904. It is found in Australia, where it has been recorded from Queensland.

The wingspan is about 13 mm (0.51 in). The forewings are pale brownish ochreous, irrorated (sprinkled) with bronzy fuscous, with purplish-metallic reflections. The stigmata is darker, with the plical hardly before the first discal. There are some dark fuscous marks around the apex and on the termen. The hindwings are grey, towards the base thinly scaled and tinged with whitish ochreous.
