= Hylograptis =

Scientific classification
- Domain: Eukaryota
- Kingdom: Animalia
- Phylum: Arthropoda
- Class: Insecta
- Order: Lepidoptera
- Family: Gelechiidae
- Subfamily: Dichomeridinae
- Genus: Hylograptis; Meyrick, 1910
- Species: H. thryptica

Binomial name
- Hylograptis thryptica Meyrick, 1910

Synonyms
- Dichomeris thryptica

Genus of moths

Hylograptis is a monotypic moth genus in the family Gelechiidae. Its only species, Hylograptis thryptica, is found in Australia and New Guinea, where it has been recorded from Woodlark Island and Sariba Island. Both the genus and the species were first described by Edward Meyrick in 1910.

The wingspan is 18–19 mm. The forewings are rather light brown with a dark purplish-fuscous streak along the costa from the base to near the apex, suffused beneath with indigo bluish. Beneath this is a deep ferruginous supra-median streak from the base to three-fourths, and a similar rather shorter submedian streak. The terminal fourth is more or less suffused with purplish and bluish, crossed by a slightly curved deep ferruginous transverse streak at about five-sixths, mixed with black at the costal extremity and on the lower half. The hindwings are dark fuscous.
