= Strobisia sapphiritis =

Scientific classification
- Kingdom: Animalia
- Phylum: Arthropoda
- Class: Insecta
- Order: Lepidoptera
- Family: Gelechiidae
- Genus: Strobisia
- Species: S. sapphiritis

Binomial name
- Strobisia sapphiritis Meyrick, 1914

Species of moth

Strobisia sapphiritis is a moth belonging to the Gelechiidae family. It was described by Edward Meyrick in 1914 and is found in Guyana.

The wingspan of this species ranges from 12 to 13 mm. The forewings are bronzy blackish with metallic-blue markings. These markings include a dot near the base in the middle, a curved oblique series of three towards the base, and one beneath the fold at one-fourth. There is also an oblique strigula originating from the costa at one-third, accompanied by a dot beneath it. Additionally, an oblique streak from the middle of the costa reaching halfway across the wing and a triangle irregularly outlined on the dorsum beyond the middle, reaching nearly halfway across the wing. A curved, irregular submarginal streak runs from four-fifths of the costa to the tornus, being thickest opposite the apex. The hindwings are dark fuscous.
