= Sitotroga exquisita =

Scientific classification
- Kingdom: Animalia
- Phylum: Arthropoda
- Clade: Pancrustacea
- Class: Insecta
- Order: Lepidoptera
- Family: Gelechiidae
- Genus: Sitotroga
- Species: S. exquisita

Binomial name
- Sitotroga exquisita Bidzilya & Mey, 2011

Species of moth

Sitotroga exquisita is a moth of the family Gelechiidae. It was described by Oleksiy V. Bidzilya and Wolfram Mey in 2011. It is found Namibia.
