= Strobisia stellaris =

Scientific classification
- Domain: Eukaryota
- Kingdom: Animalia
- Phylum: Arthropoda
- Class: Insecta
- Order: Lepidoptera
- Family: Gelechiidae
- Genus: Strobisia
- Species: S. stellaris

Binomial name
- Strobisia stellaris (C. Felder & Rogenhofer, 1875)

Synonyms
- Pancalia stellaris Felder & Rogenhofer, 1875

Species of moth

Strobisia stellaris is a moth of the family Gelechiidae. It was described by Cajetan Felder and Alois Friedrich Rogenhofer in 1875. It is found in Colombia.
