= Sitotroga horogramma =

Scientific classification
- Kingdom: Animalia
- Phylum: Arthropoda
- Class: Insecta
- Order: Lepidoptera
- Family: Gelechiidae
- Genus: Sitotroga
- Species: S. horogramma

Binomial name
- Sitotroga horogramma (Meyrick, 1921)

Synonyms
- Nesolechia horogramma Meyrick, 1921; Chelaria asemodes Meyrick, 1938

Species of moth

Sitotroga horogramma is a moth of the family Gelechiidae. It was described by Edward Meyrick in 1921. It is found on Fiji and in Papua New Guinea.

The wingspan is about 16 mm. The forewings are pale yellow ochreous with a narrow dark fuscous streak along the costa from the base, becoming suffused towards the apex and continued around the termen to near the tornus. The plical and second discal stigmata are dark fuscous. The hindwings are grey.
