= Eunebristis zingarella =

Scientific classification
- Domain: Eukaryota
- Kingdom: Animalia
- Phylum: Arthropoda
- Class: Insecta
- Order: Lepidoptera
- Family: Gelechiidae
- Genus: Eunebristis
- Species: E. zingarella

Binomial name
- Eunebristis zingarella (Walsingham, 1897)

Synonyms
- Malacotricha zingarella Walsingham, 1897

Species of moth

Eunebristis zingarella is a moth in the family Gelechiidae. It was described by Thomas de Grey, 6th Baron Walsingham, in 1897. It is found in the West Indies.

The wingspan is about 9 mm. The forewings are ochreous, mottled with brick-red and streaked with steel-blue, with three black dots along the termen. The hindwings are pale grey.

The larvae feed on Coccoloba uvifera. They mine the leaves of their host plant.
