= Sphenocrates aulodocha =

Scientific classification
- Kingdom: Animalia
- Phylum: Arthropoda
- Class: Insecta
- Order: Lepidoptera
- Family: Gelechiidae
- Genus: Sphenocrates
- Species: S. aulodocha

Binomial name
- Sphenocrates aulodocha (Meyrick, 1918)

Synonyms
- Crocanthes aulodocha Meyrick, 1918

Species of moth

Sphenocrates aulodocha is a moth in the family Gelechiidae. It was described by Edward Meyrick in 1918. It is found on New Guinea.

The wingspan is about 21 mm. The forewings are purplish fuscous with a triangular whitish spot on the middle of the costa, where a whitish line interrupted in the middle runs to near the dorsum beyond the middle. There is a slight whitish mark along the costa near the apex. The hindwings are grey.
