= Sinoe robiniella =

Scientific classification
- Kingdom: Animalia
- Phylum: Arthropoda
- Clade: Pancrustacea
- Class: Insecta
- Order: Lepidoptera
- Family: Gelechiidae
- Genus: Sinoe
- Species: S. robiniella

Binomial name
- Sinoe robiniella (Fitch, 1859)

Synonyms
- Anacampsis robiniella Fitch, 1859; Gelechia robiniella; Recurvaria robiniella; Sinoe fuscopalidella Chambers, 1873; Gelechia robiniaefoliella Chambers, 1880

Species of moth

Sinoe robiniella is a moth of the family Gelechiidae. It is found in North America, where it has been recorded from New York west to Indiana south to Mississippi and Arkansas.

The wingspan is 9−11.4 mm. Adults are on wing from late April to September in the south and from late May to August in the north.

The larvae feed on Robinia pseudoacacia, Amorpha fruticosa and Gleditsia species.
