= Rhadinophylla siderosema =

Scientific classification
- Domain: Eukaryota
- Kingdom: Animalia
- Phylum: Arthropoda
- Class: Insecta
- Order: Lepidoptera
- Family: Gelechiidae
- Genus: Rhadinophylla
- Species: R. siderosema

Binomial name
- Rhadinophylla siderosema Turner, 1919

Synonyms
- Dichomeris siderosema

Species of moth

Rhadinophylla siderosema is a moth in the family Gelechiidae. It was described by Alfred Jefferis Turner in 1919. It is found in Australia, where it has been recorded from Queensland. It has also been recorded from Fiji.

The wingspan is about 10 mm. The forewings are whitish closely irrorated with grey except towards the costa. The costal edge towards the base is dark-fuscous and there are some dark-fuscous dots, one on the fold at one-sixth, the first discal at one-third, the second discal at two-thirds and the plical beyond the first discal. There is a costal dot at two-thirds, another at the tornus, the two connected by a narrow transverse ferruginous fascia, which touches the second discal dot. There is also a series of ferruginous-fuscous dots on the termen and apical third of the costa. The hindwings are grey.
