= Strobisia argentifrons =

Scientific classification
- Domain: Eukaryota
- Kingdom: Animalia
- Phylum: Arthropoda
- Class: Insecta
- Order: Lepidoptera
- Family: Gelechiidae
- Genus: Strobisia
- Species: S. argentifrons

Binomial name
- Strobisia argentifrons Walsingham, 1910

Species of moth

Strobisia argentifrons is a moth of the family Gelechiidae. It was described by Thomas de Grey, 6th Baron Walsingham, in 1910. It is found in Mexico (Tabasco).

The wingspan is about 8 mm. The forewings are dark bronzy brown, with a slight leaden grey sheen at the base, extending to the dorsum below the fold, followed at one-third by an oblique leaden grey costal spot, beyond which are two silvery costal streaks, one at three-fifths, and one before the apex, both tending obliquely outward. The dark brown cilia have a pale line at their base, a rather wider line beyond their middle reaching around their apex. The hindwings are pale bronzy brown, with a reduplicated pale line in the cilia, at the apex only.
