= Scrobipalpuloides chiquitelloides =

Scientific classification
- Kingdom: Animalia
- Phylum: Arthropoda
- Clade: Pancrustacea
- Class: Insecta
- Order: Lepidoptera
- Family: Gelechiidae
- Genus: Scrobipalpuloides
- Species: S. chiquitelloides

Binomial name
- Scrobipalpuloides chiquitelloides (Powell & Povolný, 2001)

Synonyms
- Tuta chiquitelloides Powell & Povolný, 2001

Species of moth

Scrobipalpuloides chiquitelloides is a moth in the family Gelechiidae. It was described by Powell and Povolný in 2001. It is found in North America, where it has been recorded from California.

The length of the forewings is 3.9-4.8 mm for males and 4.3-4.5 mm for females. Adults have been recorded on wing in April and from November to December in one generation per year.
