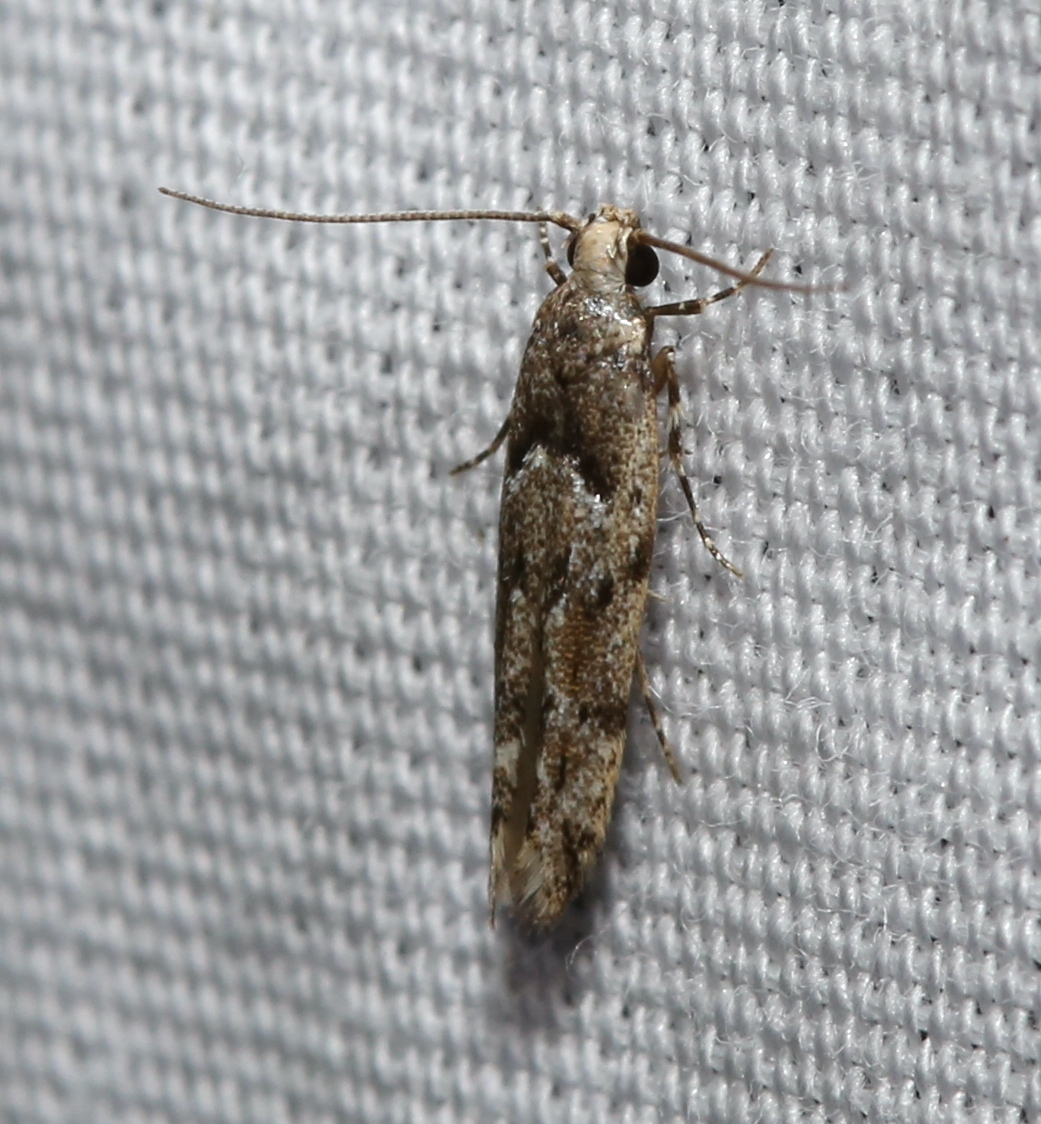

Scientific classification
- Kingdom: Animalia
- Phylum: Arthropoda
- Class: Insecta
- Order: Lepidoptera
- Family: Gelechiidae
- Genus: Sinoe
- Species: S. kwakae

Binomial name
- Sinoe kwakae Lee, 2012

= Sinoe kwakae =

Species of moth

Sinoe kwakae is a moth of the family Gelechiidae. It is found in North America, where it has been recorded from Louisiana to Florida.

The wingspan is 9.2−12.4 mm. Adults are on wing from January to March in the south and from March to June in the north.

== Etymology ==
The species is named for No-bong Kwak, the mother of the senior author.
