= Sitotroga psacasta =

Scientific classification
- Kingdom: Animalia
- Phylum: Arthropoda
- Class: Insecta
- Order: Lepidoptera
- Family: Gelechiidae
- Genus: Sitotroga
- Species: S. psacasta

Binomial name
- Sitotroga psacasta (Meyrick, 1908)

Synonyms
- Paltodora psacasta Meyrick, 1908; Sitotroga celyphodes Meyrick, 1909; Sitotroga nea Walsingham, 1920

Species of moth

Sitotroga psacasta is a moth of the family Gelechiidae. It was described by Edward Meyrick in 1908. It is found in France, Greece, Spain (Canary island), Sicily, Congo (Katanga Province), Namibia, South Africa (Gauteng), Zimbabwe and in Réunion and the Solomon islands.

The wingspan is 11–13 mm. The forewings are pale stramineous, with tawny brownish speckling grouped in a costal streak at the base and a costal spot beyond the middle, an elongate discal spot scarcely before the middle, and another resting on the fold, below and somewhat before it, the speckling being carried along the fold to the base. At the lower edge of the plical patch is a small black spot lying on the fold and along the termen the brown speckling is almost continuous, forming a narrow band in which is another small black spot at about the middle. There are also indications of three brown spots along the middle of the terminal cilia which are pale stramineous. The hindwings are pale shining steel-grey.
