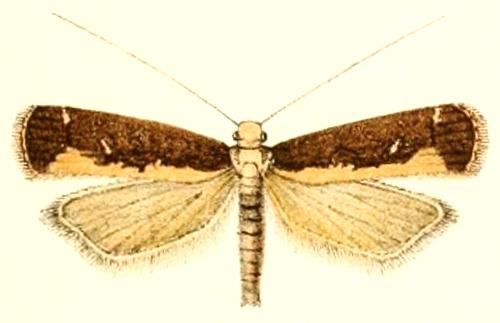
- Myconita plutelliformis

Scientific classification
- Kingdom: Animalia
- Phylum: Arthropoda
- Class: Insecta
- Order: Lepidoptera
- Family: Gelechiidae
- Subfamily: Dichomeridinae
- Genus: Myconita; Meyrick 1923

Type species
- Ceratophora plutelliformis Snellen, 1901

= Myconita =

Genus of moths

Myconita is a genus of moths in the family Gelechiidae.

== Species ==
- Myconita lipara Bradley 1953 (from Fiji)
- Myconita plutelliformis Snellen, 1901 (from Australia and Java)
