= Eunebristis zachroa =

Scientific classification
- Kingdom: Animalia
- Phylum: Arthropoda
- Class: Insecta
- Order: Lepidoptera
- Family: Gelechiidae
- Genus: Eunebristis
- Species: E. zachroa

Binomial name
- Eunebristis zachroa (Meyrick, 1914)

Synonyms
- Noeza zachroa Meyrick, 1914

Species of moth

Eunebristis zachroa is a moth in the family Gelechiidae. It was described by Edward Meyrick in 1914. It is found in Guyana.

The wingspan is 13–14 mm. The forewings are yellow ochreous, tinged with ferruginous towards the costa and with the extreme base purple. There is a deep blue streak along the costa from the base to the middle, and two other streaks beneath it from the base to a transverse deep blue spot at two-fifths, the upper interval deep red, the lower orange. There is a transverse dark indigo-blue blotch in the disc beyond the middle, connected with the costal streak, and two small confluent spots between this and the preceding blotch. There is also a series of confluent blackish blotches along the fold throughout, confluent with these markings above and with a dark grey streak along the dorsum from the base to the tornus. A blue-blackish curved transverse shade is found at two-thirds, preceding a discal blotch of ground colour suffused with ferruginous above and marked with blue-blackish on the veins. Beyond this is a ferruginous fascia, marked with blue-blackish streaks on the veins. The terminal yellowish space is somewhat brassy metallic with three transversely placed blue-black dots. The hindwings are dark fuscous.
