= Plocamosaris =

Scientific classification
- Kingdom: Animalia
- Phylum: Arthropoda
- Class: Insecta
- Order: Lepidoptera
- Family: Gelechiidae
- Subfamily: Dichomeridinae
- Genus: Plocamosaris; Meyrick, 1910

Synonyms
- Noeza Walker, 1866 (preocc. Meigen, 1800); Neochrista Meyrick, 1923

Genus of moths

Plocamosaris is a genus of moth in the family Gelechiidae.

== Species ==
- Plocamosaris auritogata (Walsingham, 1911)
- Plocamosaris pandora Meyrick, 1912
- Plocamosaris telegraphella (Walker, 1866)
