= Eunebristis gyralea =

Scientific classification
- Kingdom: Animalia
- Phylum: Arthropoda
- Class: Insecta
- Order: Lepidoptera
- Family: Gelechiidae
- Genus: Eunebristis
- Species: E. gyralea

Binomial name
- Eunebristis gyralea (Meyrick, 1922)

Synonyms
- Noeza gyralea Meyrick, 1922

Species of moth

Eunebristis gyralea is a moth in the family Gelechiidae. It was described by Edward Meyrick in 1922. It is found in Amazonas, Brazil.

The wingspan is about 10 mm. The forewings are deep purple with two red longitudinal lines beneath the costa from the base to one-third and two pairs of short fine orange-reddish lines in the disc beneath these. There are 8-shaped blotches irregularly and interruptedly outlined with ferruginous ochreous in the disc before and beyond the middle, the first connected by suffused marks with the costa and dorsum. There is a curved ferruginous-ochreous subterminal line traversed by four streaks on the veins and a ferruginous-ochreous marginal streak around the posterior part of the costa and termen. The hindwings are blackish grey.
