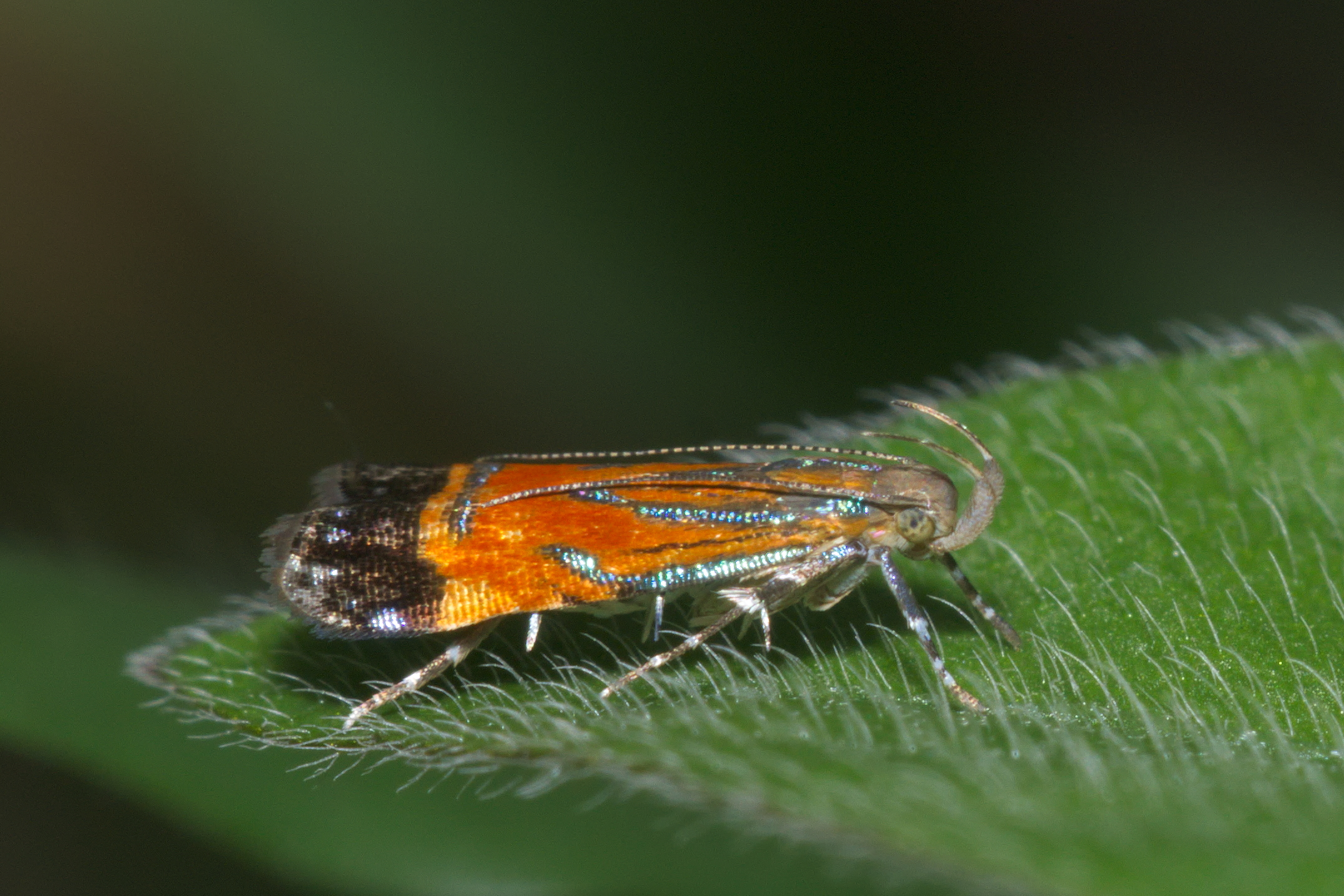

Scientific classification
- Kingdom: Animalia
- Phylum: Arthropoda
- Class: Insecta
- Order: Lepidoptera
- Family: Gelechiidae
- Subfamily: Dichomeridinae; Hampson, 1918

Synonyms
- Dichomeridae Hampson, 1918; Dichomerisinae Heslop, 1938 (misspelling); Dichomerinae Le Marchand, 1947; Brachmiinae Heslop, 1938

= Dichomeridinae =

Subfamily of moths

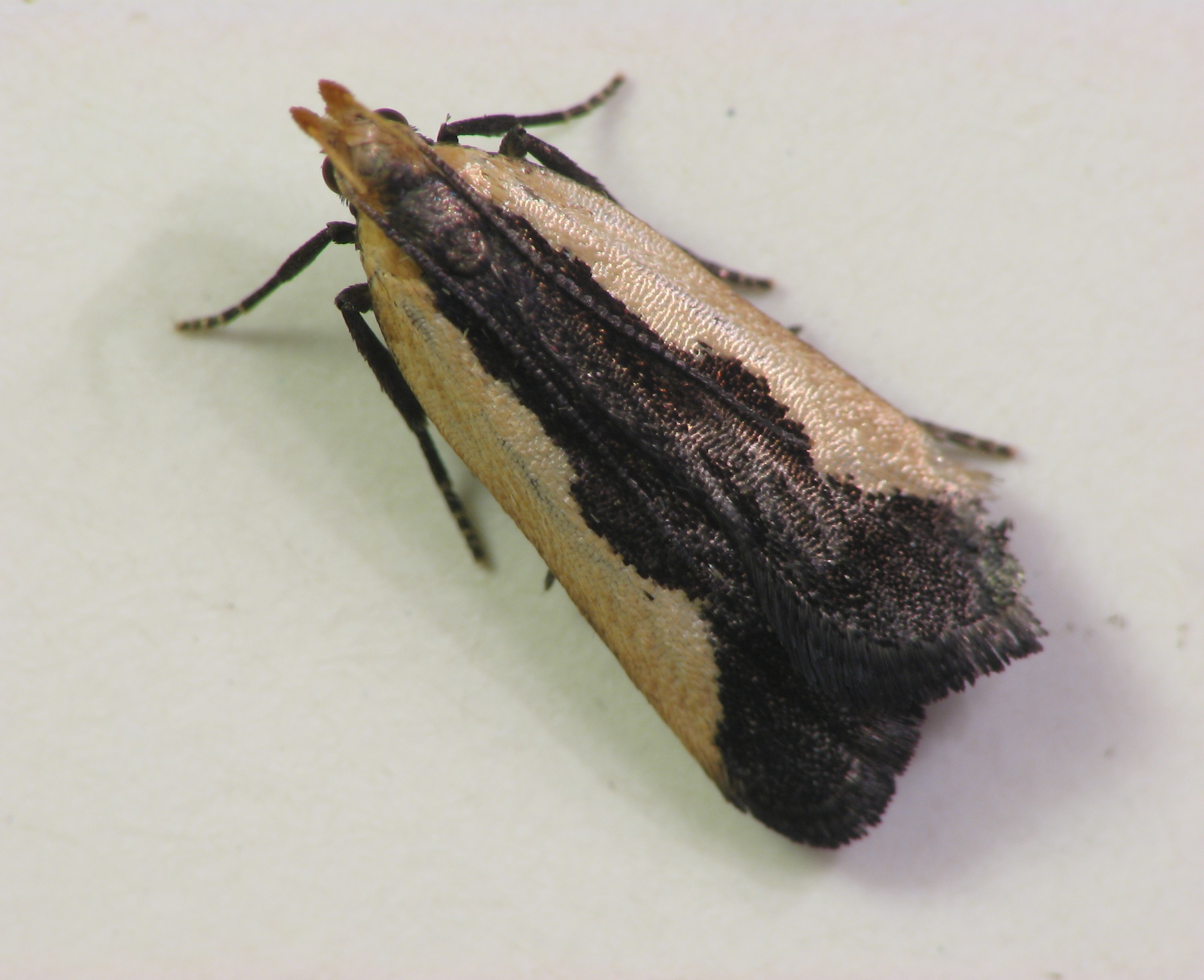
Dichomeris inserrata

Dichomeridinae is a subfamily of moths in the family Gelechiidae.

== Distribution ==
Almost worldwide, except the Arctic and Antarctic regions.

== Diversity ==
The subfamily formerly included three tribes, about 29 genera and about 900 species. However, a 2013 study moved the Chelariini to the subfamily Anacampsinae.

== Taxonomy and systematics ==
- Dichomeridini Hampson, 1918
  - Acanthophila
  - Acompsia
  - Anasphaltis
  - Arotria Meyrick, 1904
  - Atasthalistis Meyrick, 1886
  - Besciva Busck, 1914
  - Brachmia
  - Cathegesis Walsingham, 1910
  - Dichomeris
  - Eunebristis Meyrick, 1923
  - Harpagidia Ragonot, 1895
  - Helcystogramma
  - Holaxyra Meyrick, 1913
  - Hylograptis Meyrick, 1910
  - Hyodectis
  - Myconita
  - Onebala Walker, 1864
  - Oxypteryx Rebel, 1911
  - Plocamosaris Meyrick, 1912
  - Rhadinophylla Turner, 1919
  - Sclerocopa Meyrick, 1937
  - Scodes
  - Streniastis
  - Symbolistis
  - Syndesmica (not Gelechiidae?)

== Formerly placed here ==
- Anaptilora (now in Autostichidae)
- Capidentalia (=Bagdadia)
