= Atasthalistis =

Scientific classification
- Domain: Eukaryota
- Kingdom: Animalia
- Phylum: Arthropoda
- Class: Insecta
- Order: Lepidoptera
- Family: Gelechiidae
- Subfamily: Dichomeridinae
- Genus: Atasthalistis; Meyrick, 1904

Synonyms
- Croesopola Meyrick, 1904

Genus of moths

Atasthalistis is a genus of moths in the family Gelechiidae.

== Species ==
- Atasthalistis hieropla Meyrick, 1919
- Atasthalistis ochreoviridella (Pagenstecher, 1900)
- Atasthalistis pyrocosma Meyrick, 1886
- Atasthalistis tricolor (Felder & Rogenhofer, 1875)
