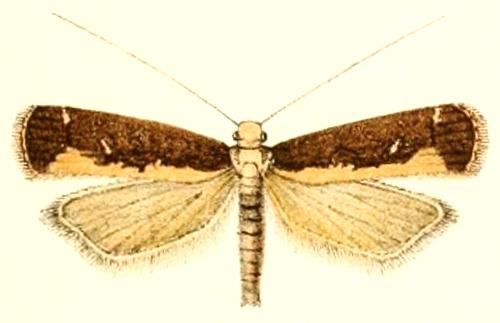

Scientific classification
- Kingdom: Animalia
- Phylum: Arthropoda
- Class: Insecta
- Order: Lepidoptera
- Family: Gelechiidae
- Genus: Myconita
- Species: M. plutelliformis

Binomial name
- Myconita plutelliformis (Snellen, 1901)

Synonyms
- Ceratophora plutelliformis Snellen, 1901

= Myconita plutelliformis =

Species of moth

Myconita plutelliformis is a moth in the family Gelechiidae. It was described by Snellen in 1901. It is found in India, Indonesia (Java) and Australia, where it has been recorded from the Northern Territory and Queensland.
