= Strobisia leucura =

Scientific classification
- Domain: Eukaryota
- Kingdom: Animalia
- Phylum: Arthropoda
- Class: Insecta
- Order: Lepidoptera
- Family: Gelechiidae
- Genus: Strobisia
- Species: S. leucura

Binomial name
- Strobisia leucura (Walsingham, 1910)

Synonyms
- Systasiota leucura Walsingham, 1910

Species of moth

Strobisia leucura is a moth of the family Gelechiidae. It was described by Thomas de Grey, 6th Baron Walsingham, in 1910. It is found in Mexico (Vera Cruz).

The wingspan is about 13 mm. The forewings are dark umber-brown, with a leaden grey costal patch at the base reaching nearly to one-third, widened and produced downward at its outer end, but scarcely touching the fold. Joining it at the extreme base is a leaden grey band, running along the dorsum below the fold to beyond the middle, where it is joined by a transverse fascia starting narrowly on the costa, enclosing a dark brown spot on the cell and consisting above the middle of shining silvery blue-grey scales, a narrower subapical fascia of the same colour, much zigzagged in its course, precedes the termen. The apex is slightly caudate, and is distinctly marked by a slender whitish ochreous line, along the base of the dark brown costal cilia, which is continued along the upper half of the sinuate termen. The terminal cilia is dark brown, with a curved white patch immediately below the apex which is very apparent on the underside. The hindwings are dark bronzy brown.
