= Schneidereria pistaciicola =

Scientific classification
- Domain: Eukaryota
- Kingdom: Animalia
- Phylum: Arthropoda
- Class: Insecta
- Order: Lepidoptera
- Family: Gelechiidae
- Genus: Schneidereria
- Species: S. pistaciicola

Binomial name
- Schneidereria pistaciicola (Danilevski, 1955)

Synonyms
- Recurvaria pistaciicola Danilevski, 1955; Telphusa kreuzbergi Gerasimov, 1956

Species of moth

Schneidereria pistaciicola is a moth of the family Gelechiidae. It is found in Tajikistan, Uzbekistan, Turkmenistan, Iran and Iraq.

There are two to three generations per year.

The larvae feed on Pistacia mutica.
