= Atasthalistis tricolor =

Scientific classification
- Domain: Eukaryota
- Kingdom: Animalia
- Phylum: Arthropoda
- Class: Insecta
- Order: Lepidoptera
- Family: Gelechiidae
- Genus: Atasthalistis
- Species: A. tricolor

Binomial name
- Atasthalistis tricolor (C. Felder, R. Felder & Rogenhofer, 1875)

Synonyms
- Ypsolophus tricolor Felder & Rogenhofer, 1875; Dichomeris tricolor

Species of moth

Atasthalistis tricolor is a moth in the family Gelechiidae. It was described by Cajetan Felder, Rudolf Felder and Alois Friedrich Rogenhofer in 1875. It is found in Indonesia (Sulawesi, Java), the Solomon Islands and Australia, where it has been recorded from the Northern Territory.

The wingspan is about 22 mm. The forewings are blackish fuscous with a broad very pale whitish-yellowish streak along the costa from the base to near the apex, leaving the costal edge narrowly blackish from one-fourth onwards. The lower edge of this streak is shortly indented before the middle and there is a pale whitish-yellowish line along the hind margin from above the apex to below the anal angle, externally margined with a few black scales. The hindwings are bright orange.
