= Sriferia oxymeris =

Scientific classification
- Kingdom: Animalia
- Phylum: Arthropoda
- Class: Insecta
- Order: Lepidoptera
- Family: Gelechiidae
- Genus: Sriferia
- Species: S. oxymeris

Binomial name
- Sriferia oxymeris (Meyrick, 1929)

Synonyms
- Epithectis oxymeris Meyrick, 1929

Species of moth

Sriferia oxymeris is a moth of the family Gelechiidae. It was described by Edward Meyrick in 1929. It is found in North America, where it has been recorded from Texas.

The wingspan is about 11 mm.
