= Harpagidia acanthopis =

Scientific classification
- Kingdom: Animalia
- Phylum: Arthropoda
- Class: Insecta
- Order: Lepidoptera
- Family: Gelechiidae
- Genus: Harpagidia
- Species: H. acanthopis

Binomial name
- Harpagidia acanthopis (Meyrick, 1932)

Synonyms
- Gelechia acanthopis Meyrick, 1932

Species of moth

Harpagidia acanthopis is a moth in the family Gelechiidae. It was described by Edward Meyrick in 1932. It is found in Japan.

The wingspan is 16–20 mm.
