= Anasphaltis =

Scientific classification
- Domain: Eukaryota
- Kingdom: Animalia
- Phylum: Arthropoda
- Class: Insecta
- Order: Lepidoptera
- Family: Gelechiidae
- Subfamily: Dichomeridinae
- Genus: Anasphaltis; Meyrick, 1925

Genus of moths

Anasphaltis is a genus of moths in the family Gelechiidae.

== Species ==
- Anasphaltis renigerellus (Zeller, 1839)
