= Oxypteryx =

Scientific classification
- Domain: Eukaryota
- Kingdom: Animalia
- Phylum: Arthropoda
- Class: Insecta
- Order: Lepidoptera
- Family: Gelechiidae
- Subfamily: Dichomeridinae
- Genus: Oxypteryx; Rebel, 1911
- Species: O. jordanella

Binomial name
- Oxypteryx jordanella Rebel, 1911

Genus of moths

Oxypteryx is a genus of moth in the family Gelechiidae. It contains only one species, Oxypteryx jordanella, which is found in Jordan and Saudi Arabia.

The wingspan is 23–24 mm. The forewings are brownish grey with several long and short black streaks. The hindwings are uniform brownish-grey.
