= Myconita lipara =

Scientific classification
- Domain: Eukaryota
- Kingdom: Animalia
- Phylum: Arthropoda
- Class: Insecta
- Order: Lepidoptera
- Family: Gelechiidae
- Genus: Myconita
- Species: M. lipara

Binomial name
- Myconita lipara Bradley, 1953

Species of moth

Myconita lipara is a moth in the family Gelechiidae. It was described by John David Bradley in 1953. It is found in Fiji.
