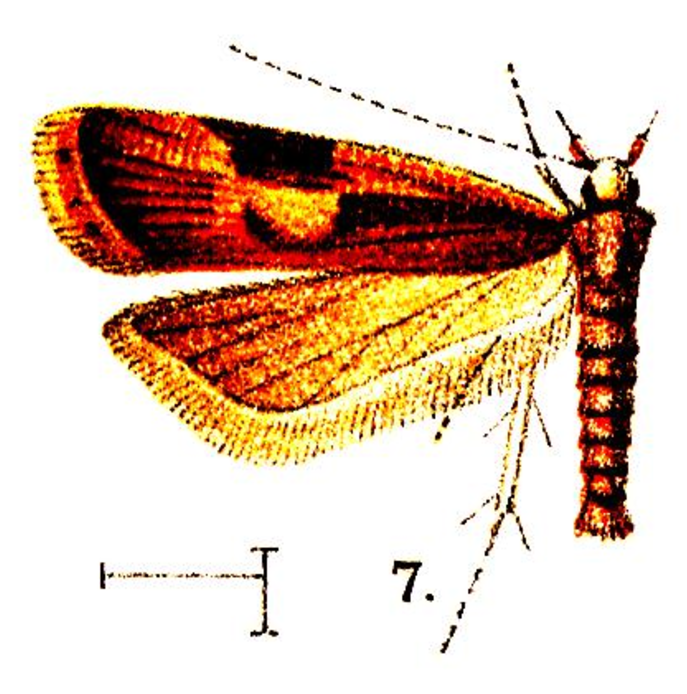
- E. oncotera ♂, from Mexico.

Scientific classification
- Kingdom: Animalia
- Phylum: Arthropoda
- Class: Insecta
- Order: Lepidoptera
- Family: Gelechiidae
- Subfamily: Dichomeridinae
- Genus: Eunebristis; Meyrick, 1923

Type species
- Noeza zachroa Meyrick, 1914

= Eunebristis =

Genus of moths

Eunebristis is a genus of moth in the family Gelechiidae.

== Species ==
- Eunebristis cinclidias (Meyrick, 1918)
- Eunebristis gyralea (Meyrick, 1922)
- Eunebristis oncotera (Walsingham, 1911)
- Eunebristis zachroa (Meyrick, 1914)
- Eunebristis zingarella (Walsingham, 1897)
