= Harpagidia amplexa =

Scientific classification
- Kingdom: Animalia
- Phylum: Arthropoda
- Class: Insecta
- Order: Lepidoptera
- Family: Gelechiidae
- Genus: Harpagidia
- Species: H. amplexa

Binomial name
- Harpagidia amplexa (Meyrick, 1925)

Synonyms
- Gelechia amplexa Meyrick, 1925

Species of moth

Harpagidia amplexa is a moth in the family Gelechiidae. It was described by Edward Meyrick in 1925. It is found in China in Guangdong and Hong Kong.
