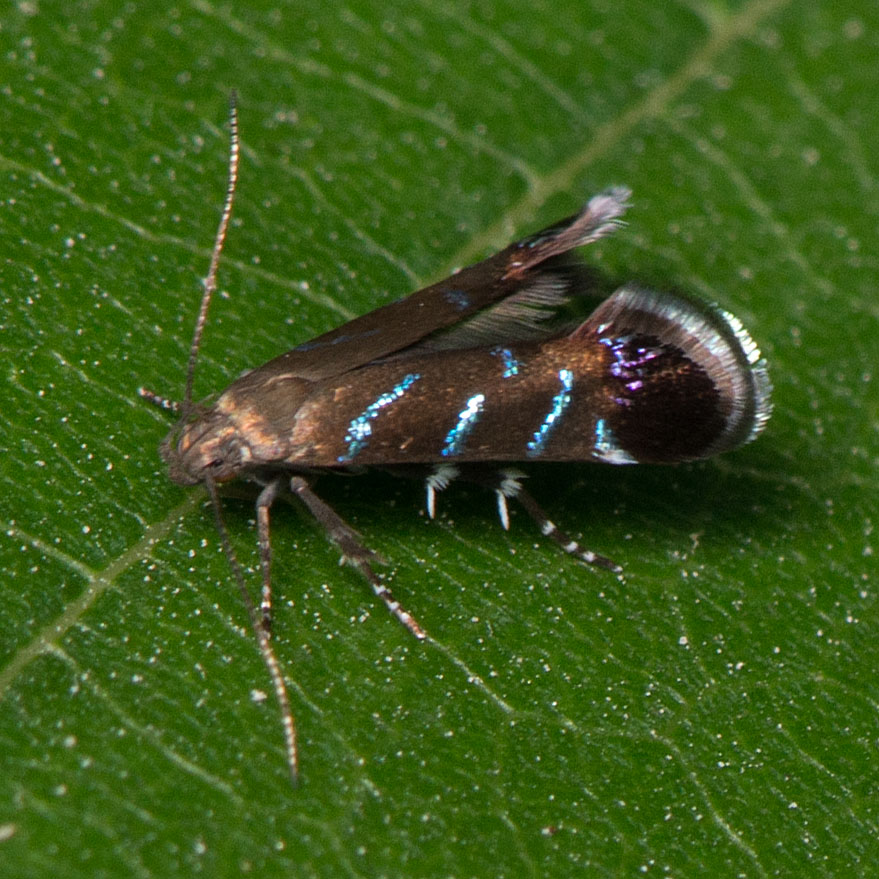

Scientific classification
- Kingdom: Animalia
- Phylum: Arthropoda
- Clade: Pancrustacea
- Class: Insecta
- Order: Lepidoptera
- Family: Gelechiidae
- Genus: Strobisia
- Species: S. iridipennella

Binomial name
- Strobisia iridipennella Clemens, 1860

Synonyms
- Strobisia aphroditeella Chambers, 1872

= Strobisia iridipennella =

Species of moth

Strobisia iridipennella, the iridescent strobisia moth, is a moth of the family Gelechiidae. It was described by James Brackenridge Clemens in 1860. It is found in North America, where it has been recorded from New York to Florida, west to Texas and Illinois, south to Mexico.
