= Scrobipalpuloides insularis =

Scientific classification
- Kingdom: Animalia
- Phylum: Arthropoda
- Clade: Pancrustacea
- Class: Insecta
- Order: Lepidoptera
- Family: Gelechiidae
- Genus: Scrobipalpuloides
- Species: S. insularis

Binomial name
- Scrobipalpuloides insularis (Powell & Povolný, 2001)

Synonyms
- Tuta insularis Powell & Povolný, 2001

Species of moth

Scrobipalpuloides insularis is a moth in the family Gelechiidae. It was described by Powell and Povolný in 2001. It is found in North America, where it has been recorded from California.

Adults have been recorded on wing in February and May.
