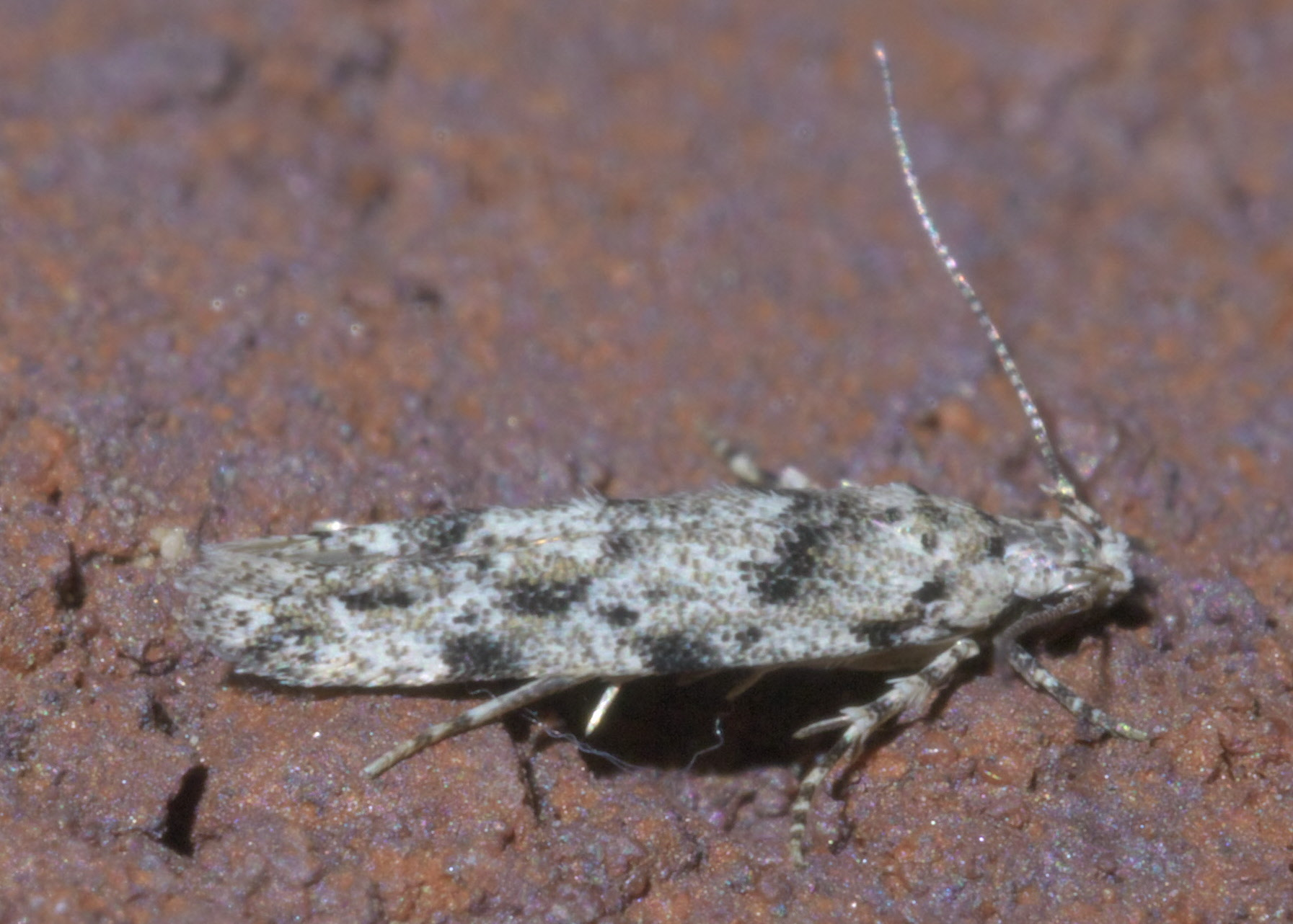

Scientific classification
- Domain: Eukaryota
- Kingdom: Animalia
- Phylum: Arthropoda
- Class: Insecta
- Order: Lepidoptera
- Family: Gelechiidae
- Genus: Sinoe
- Species: S. chambersi

Binomial name
- Sinoe chambersi Lee, 2012

= Sinoe chambersi =

Species of moth

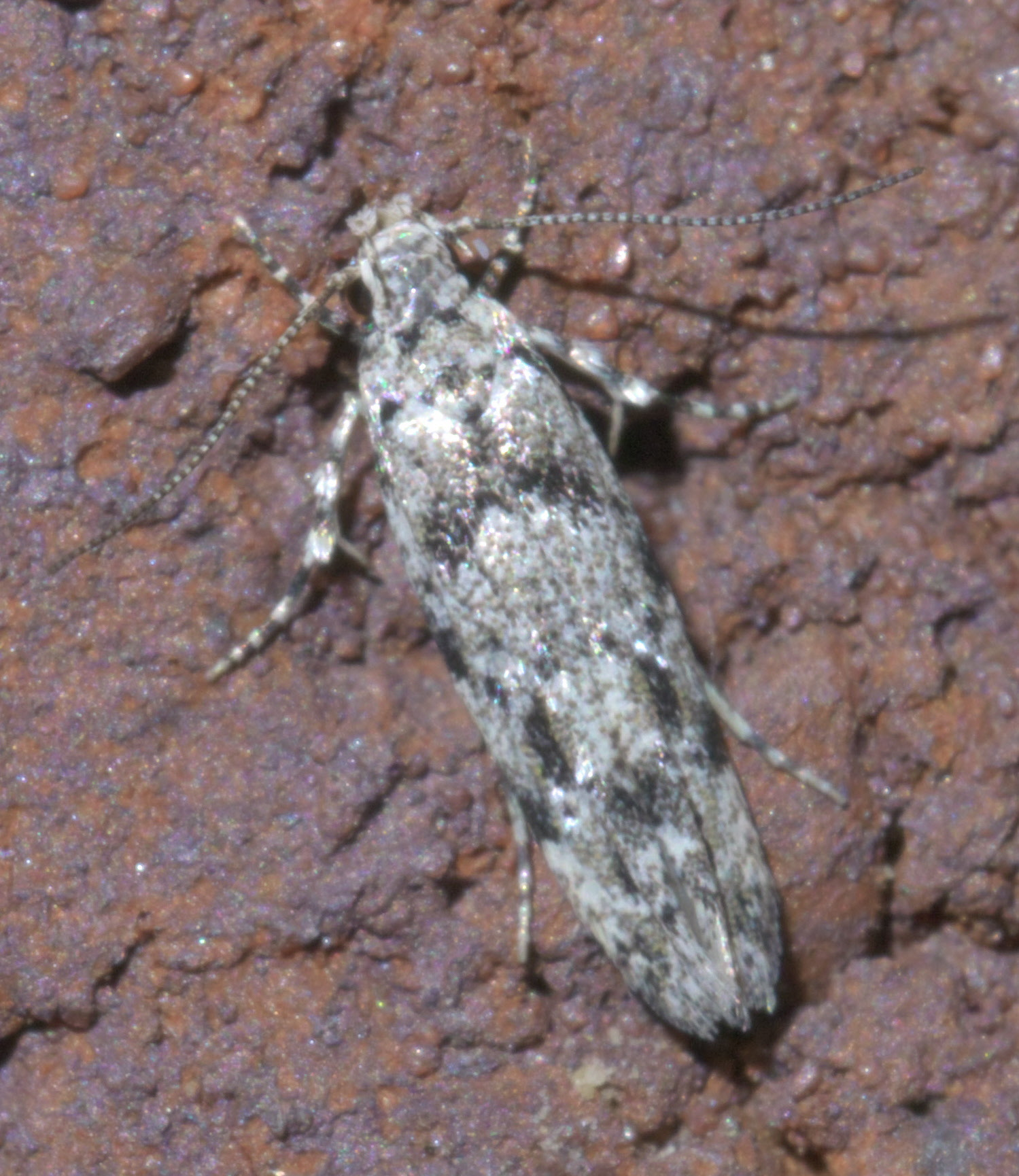
Sinoe chambersi, Hodges #1834.1, Size: 4.9 mm

Sinoe chambersi is a moth of the family Gelechiidae. It is found in North America, where it has been recorded from the United States (from Pennsylvania to Mississippi and in California) and from Canada (from Alberta to Quebec).

The wingspan is 11.4−11.6 mm. Adults are on wing from January to March in the south and from March to June in the north.

== Etymology ==
The species is named for Vactor Tousey Chambers.
