= Scrobipalpuloides chiquitella =

Scientific classification
- Domain: Eukaryota
- Kingdom: Animalia
- Phylum: Arthropoda
- Class: Insecta
- Order: Lepidoptera
- Family: Gelechiidae
- Genus: Scrobipalpuloides
- Species: S. chiquitella

Binomial name
- Scrobipalpuloides chiquitella (Busck, 1910)

Synonyms
- Gnorimoschema chiquitella Busck, 1910; Tuta chiquitella

Species of moth

Scrobipalpuloides chiquitella is a moth in the family Gelechiidae. It was described by August Busck in 1910. It is found in North America, where it has been recorded from New Mexico and California.

The wingspan is about 8 mm. The forewings are white, evenly and freely dusted with black atoms, each of the long scales are white at the base and the extreme tip, with a black band across the middle. The back hindwings are light silvery fuscous.
