= Hyodectis =

Scientific classification
- Kingdom: Animalia
- Phylum: Arthropoda
- Class: Insecta
- Order: Lepidoptera
- Family: Gelechiidae
- Subfamily: Dichomeridinae
- Genus: Hyodectis; Meyrick, 1904
- Species: H. crenoides

Binomial name
- Hyodectis crenoides Meyrick, 1904

Genus of moths

Hyodectis is a genus of moth in the family Gelechiidae. It contains only one species, Hyodectis crenoides, which is found in Australia, where it has been recorded from New South Wales and Victoria.

The wingspan is 14–17 mm (0.55–0.67 in). The forewings are rather light brown, sometimes golden-tinged and with a rather broad straight shining white streak above the middle from the base to the apex, suffusedly edged beneath with dark fuscous, especially posteriorly. There is sometimes a white dot at three-fourths touching its lower edge and is also sometimes an undefined fine whitish almost terminal line. The hindwings are whitish-fuscous or pale fuscous.
