= Semophylax apicepuncta =

Scientific classification
- Kingdom: Animalia
- Phylum: Arthropoda
- Class: Insecta
- Order: Lepidoptera
- Family: Gelechiidae
- Genus: Semophylax
- Species: S. apicepuncta

Binomial name
- Semophylax apicepuncta (Busck, 1911)

Synonyms
- Psoricoptera apicepuncta Busck, 1911; Anisoplaca praesignis Meyrick, 1913; Chelaria apicipuncta Meyrick, 1925

Species of moth

Semophylax apicepuncta is a moth in the family Gelechiidae. It was described by August Busck in 1911. It is found in Panama, Costa Rica, French Guiana and Peru.

The wingspan is about 28 mm. The forewings are light deer brown, finely mottled with indistinct, transverse, black striation. There is a small black, oblong spot on the middle of the cell and another deep black, very prominent, larger spot at the extreme apex. The hindwings are dark silky fuscous.
