= Sitotroga pseudopsacasta =

Scientific classification
- Kingdom: Animalia
- Phylum: Arthropoda
- Class: Insecta
- Order: Lepidoptera
- Family: Gelechiidae
- Genus: Sitotroga
- Species: S. pseudopsacasta

Binomial name
- Sitotroga pseudopsacasta Ponomarenko & Park, 2007

Species of moth

Sitotroga pseudopsacasta is a moth of the family Gelechiidae. It was described by Ponomarenko and Park in 2007. It is found in Korea.
