= Atasthalistis ochreoviridella =

Scientific classification
- Domain: Eukaryota
- Kingdom: Animalia
- Phylum: Arthropoda
- Class: Insecta
- Order: Lepidoptera
- Family: Gelechiidae
- Genus: Atasthalistis
- Species: A. ochreoviridella

Binomial name
- Atasthalistis ochreoviridella (Pagenstecher, 1900)

Synonyms
- Ceratophora ochreoviridella Pagenstecher, 1900; Dichomeris ochreoviridella; Atasthalistis euchroa Lower, 1900

Species of moth

Atasthalistis ochreoviridella is a moth in the family Gelechiidae. It was described by Pagenstecher in 1900. It is found in Queensland, the Bismarck Archipelago, the Philippines (Mindanao), New Guinea and the Dampier Archipelago.

The wingspan is about 20 mm.

The larvae feed on Macaranga species.
