= Schneidereria pistaciella =

Scientific classification
- Domain: Eukaryota
- Kingdom: Animalia
- Phylum: Arthropoda
- Class: Insecta
- Order: Lepidoptera
- Family: Gelechiidae
- Genus: Schneidereria
- Species: S. pistaciella

Binomial name
- Schneidereria pistaciella Weber, 1957

Species of moth

Schneidereria pistaciella is a moth of the family Gelechiidae. It is found in Ukraine, Greece, Cyprus, Syria and possibly Iraq and Iran.

The wingspan is 9–10 mm.

The larvae feed on Pistacia vera.
