= Arotria =

Scientific classification
- Domain: Eukaryota
- Kingdom: Animalia
- Phylum: Arthropoda
- Class: Insecta
- Order: Lepidoptera
- Family: Gelechiidae
- Subfamily: Dichomeridinae
- Genus: Arotria; Meyrick, 1904

Genus of moths

Arotria is a genus of moths in the family Gelechiidae.

== Species ==
- Arotria iophaea Meyrick, 1904
