= Atasthalistis pyrocosma =

Scientific classification
- Domain: Eukaryota
- Kingdom: Animalia
- Phylum: Arthropoda
- Class: Insecta
- Order: Lepidoptera
- Family: Gelechiidae
- Genus: Atasthalistis
- Species: A. pyrocosma

Binomial name
- Atasthalistis pyrocosma Meyrick, 1886

Synonyms
- Dichomeris pyrocosma

Species of moth

Atasthalistis pyrocosma is a moth in the family Gelechiidae. It was described by Edward Meyrick in 1886. It is found on New Guinea and Australia, where it has been recorded from Queensland.

The wingspan is about 22 mm. The forewings are black, slightly purplish tinged with a rather narrow pale whitish-yellow streak close beneath the costa from the base to four-fifths, leaving the costal edge black, attenuated at the apex. There is a minute yellow-whitish costal dot near beyond the apex of this and a deep orange hindmarginal fascia from the apex to the anal angle, moderate on the costa, gradually attenuated to a point beneath. There is also an interrupted black hindmarginal line. The hindwings are bright orange with a large blackish apical patch, bounded by a slightly curved line from three-fifths of the costa to the middle of the hindmargin.
