= Eunebristis cinclidias =

Scientific classification
- Kingdom: Animalia
- Phylum: Arthropoda
- Class: Insecta
- Order: Lepidoptera
- Family: Gelechiidae
- Genus: Eunebristis
- Species: E. cinclidias

Binomial name
- Eunebristis cinclidias (Meyrick, 1918)

Synonyms
- Noeza cinclidias Meyrick, 1918

Species of moth

Eunebristis cinclidias is a moth in the family Gelechiidae. It was described by Edward Meyrick in 1918. It is found in French Guiana.

The wingspan is about 16 mm. The forewings are deep brownish crimson with dark grey elongate basal spots above the middle and near the dorsum, as well as a streak along the basal half of the dorsum, and a band of several irregular partially connected longitudinal streaks before the middle. There is a curved transverse series of several small partially connected ochreous-whitish spots at one-fourth and a deep reddish-orange transverse fascia at about three-fourths, broad costally and narrowed to a point on the dorsum, edged with fine irregular ochreous-whitish lines, the costal edge infuscated between these, and with a small round dark fuscous discal spot edged with ochreous whitish within the anterior edge of this. There are several ochreous-whitish marginal dots around the apex. The hindwings are dark grey.
