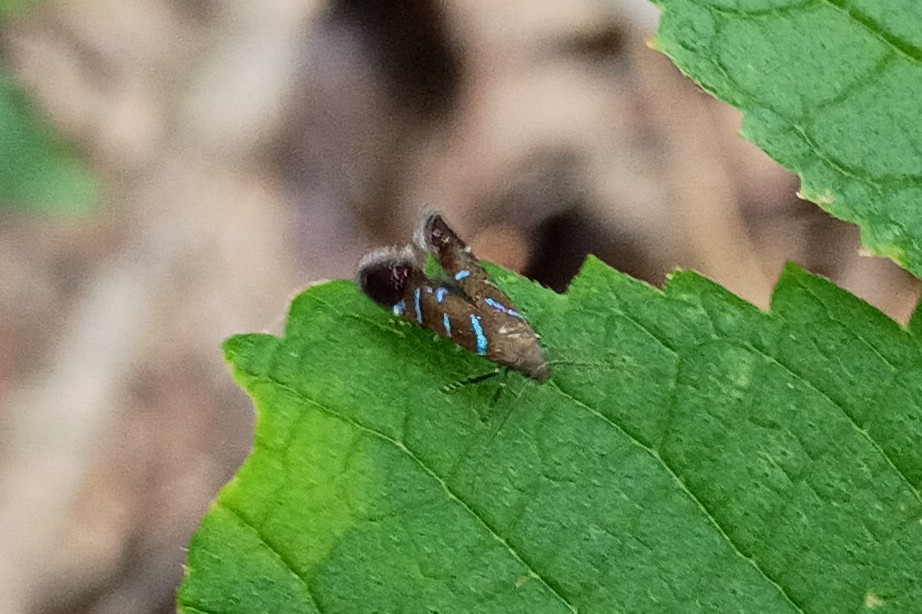

Scientific classification
- Kingdom: Animalia
- Phylum: Arthropoda
- Clade: Pancrustacea
- Class: Insecta
- Order: Lepidoptera
- Family: Gelechiidae
- Genus: Strobisia
- Species: S. proserpinella

Binomial name
- Strobisia proserpinella Frey & Boll, 1878

= Strobisia proserpinella =

Species of moth

Strobisia proserpinella is a moth of the family Gelechiidae. It was described by Frey and Boll in 1878. It is found in North America, where it has been recorded from Missouri and Texas.
