= Harpagidia magnetella =

Scientific classification
- Domain: Eukaryota
- Kingdom: Animalia
- Phylum: Arthropoda
- Class: Insecta
- Order: Lepidoptera
- Family: Gelechiidae
- Genus: Harpagidia
- Species: H. magnetella

Binomial name
- Harpagidia magnetella (Staudinger, 1871)

Synonyms
- Gelechia magnetella Staudinger, 1871; Harpagidia pallidibasella Ragonot, 1895; Gelechia melitophanes Meyrick, 1931

Species of moth

Harpagidia magnetella is a moth in the family Gelechiidae. It was described by Otto Staudinger in 1871. It is found in Asia Minor, Palestine, Lebanon, Armenia, Greece and Russia.

The wingspan is about 19 mm.
