= Sriferia fulmenella =

Scientific classification
- Domain: Eukaryota
- Kingdom: Animalia
- Phylum: Arthropoda
- Class: Insecta
- Order: Lepidoptera
- Family: Gelechiidae
- Genus: Sriferia
- Species: S. fulmenella

Binomial name
- Sriferia fulmenella (Busck, 1910)

Synonyms
- Gelechia fulmenella Busck, 1910; Gelechia prorepta Meyrick, 1923

Species of moth

Sriferia fulmenella is a moth of the family Gelechiidae. It was described by August Busck in 1910. It is found in North America, where it has been recorded from California and Arizona.

The wingspan is about 15 mm. The forewings are blackish brown with a bold oblique white fascia across the middle of the wing and with a zigzag white fascia across the apical part of the wing. The central fascia is nearest the base on the costal edge and its edges are uneven, especially the outer one. The apical fascia begins as a broad white costal spot at the apical fifth, which is connected with a broad oblique dorsal spot by an outwardly oblique narrower white streak. A few white scales are found around the apical edge. The hindwings are light fuscous.
