= Scrobipalpuloides dispar =

Scientific classification
- Kingdom: Animalia
- Phylum: Arthropoda
- Clade: Pancrustacea
- Class: Insecta
- Order: Lepidoptera
- Family: Gelechiidae
- Genus: Scrobipalpuloides
- Species: S. dispar

Binomial name
- Scrobipalpuloides dispar Povolný, 1990

Species of moth

Scrobipalpuloides dispar is a moth in the family Gelechiidae. It was described by Povolný in 1990. It is found in Peru.
