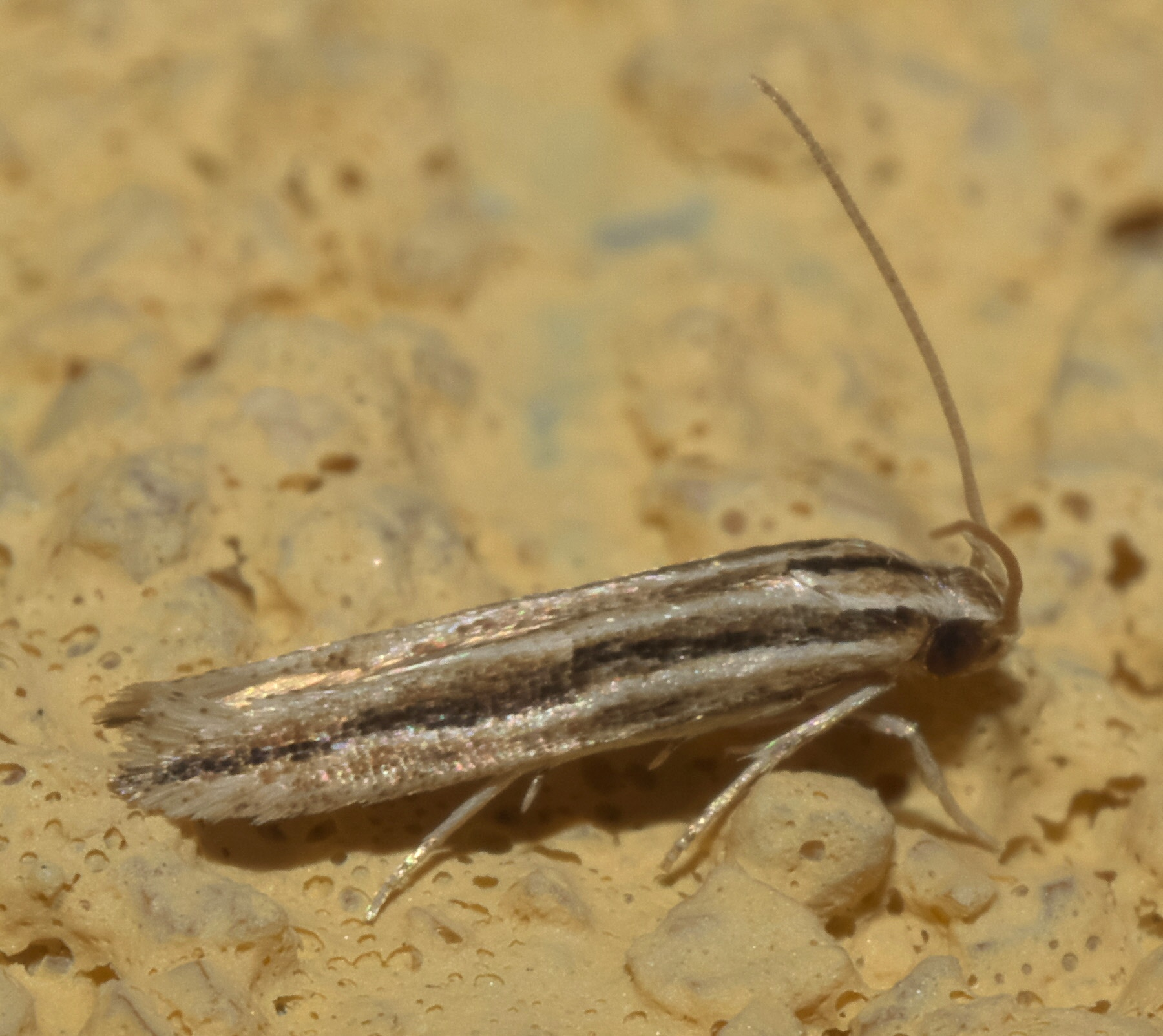

Scientific classification
- Kingdom: Animalia
- Phylum: Arthropoda
- Clade: Pancrustacea
- Class: Insecta
- Order: Lepidoptera
- Family: Gelechiidae
- Subfamily: Dichomeridinae
- Genus: Besciva; Busck, 1914

= Besciva =

Genus of moths

Besciva is a genus of moths in the family Gelechiidae.

== Species ==
- Besciva longitudinella Busck, 1914
