= Scrobipalpuloides spinosa =

Scientific classification
- Kingdom: Animalia
- Phylum: Arthropoda
- Clade: Pancrustacea
- Class: Insecta
- Order: Lepidoptera
- Family: Gelechiidae
- Genus: Scrobipalpuloides
- Species: S. spinosa

Binomial name
- Scrobipalpuloides spinosa (Povolný, 2000)

Synonyms
- Tuta spinosa Povolný, 2000

Species of moth

Scrobipalpuloides spinosa is a moth in the family Gelechiidae. It was described by Povolný in 2000. It is found in North America, where it has been recorded from California.
