= Semophylax verecundum =

Scientific classification
- Domain: Eukaryota
- Kingdom: Animalia
- Phylum: Arthropoda
- Class: Insecta
- Order: Lepidoptera
- Family: Gelechiidae
- Genus: Semophylax
- Species: S. verecundum

Binomial name
- Semophylax verecundum (M. Omelko, 1988)

Synonyms
- Aenigma verecundum M. Omelko, 1988

Species of moth

Semophylax verecundum is a moth in the family Gelechiidae. It was described by Mikhail Mikhailovich Omelko in 1988. It is found in Vietnam.
