= Strobisia spintheropis =

Scientific classification
- Kingdom: Animalia
- Phylum: Arthropoda
- Clade: Pancrustacea
- Class: Insecta
- Order: Lepidoptera
- Family: Gelechiidae
- Genus: Strobisia
- Species: S. spintheropis

Binomial name
- Strobisia spintheropis Meyrick, 1922

Species of moth

Strobisia spintheropis is a moth of the family Gelechiidae. It was described by Edward Meyrick in 1922. It is found in Amazonas, Brazil.

The wingspan is 10–11 mm. The forewings are dark bronzy fuscous with bright metallic-blue markings. There are discal and subdorsal dots towards base, an oblique spot beneath the costa at one-fourth and a dot beyond the apex of this, as well as small subdorsal spots at the middle and three-fourths, and one in the disc between these. There is an oblique streak from the costa in the middle and a slenderer one at three-fourths, and a dot in the disc at three-fourths. A thick purple-metallic streak is found along the termen. The hindwings are dark fuscous.
