= Plocamosaris telegraphella =

Scientific classification
- Kingdom: Animalia
- Phylum: Arthropoda
- Class: Insecta
- Order: Lepidoptera
- Family: Gelechiidae
- Genus: Plocamosaris
- Species: P. telegraphella

Binomial name
- Plocamosaris telegraphella (Walker, 1866)

Synonyms
- Noeza telegraphella Walker, 1866; Dichomeris telegraphella

Species of moth

Plocamosaris telegraphella is a moth in the family Gelechiidae. It was described by Francis Walker in 1866. It is found in Amazonas, Brazil.

Adults are dull reddish, the forewings with a paler red costal stripe and with a silvery-white subcostal line extending along nearly half the length from the tip. There is a deep black costal line in front of the subcostal line, obliquely intersected by four little silvery-white streaks.
