= Harpagidia =

Scientific classification
- Domain: Eukaryota
- Kingdom: Animalia
- Phylum: Arthropoda
- Class: Insecta
- Order: Lepidoptera
- Family: Gelechiidae
- Subfamily: Dichomeridinae
- Genus: Harpagidia; Ragonot, 1895

Synonyms
- Glaphyrerga Meyrick, 1925

Genus of moths

Harpagidia is a genus of moths in the family Gelechiidae.

== Species ==
- Harpagidia acanthopis (Meyrick, 1932)
- Harpagidia amplexa (Meyrick, 1925)
- Harpagidia magnetella (Staudinger, 1871)
- Harpagidia mauricaudella (Oberthür, 1888)
