= Schneidereria platyphracta =

Scientific classification
- Kingdom: Animalia
- Phylum: Arthropoda
- Class: Insecta
- Order: Lepidoptera
- Family: Gelechiidae
- Genus: Schneidereria
- Species: S. platyphracta

Binomial name
- Schneidereria platyphracta (Meyrick, 1935)

Synonyms
- Telphusa platyphracta Meyrick, 1935

Species of moth

Schneidereria platyphracta is a moth of the family Gelechiidae. It is found in southern India.
