= Anasphaltis renigerellus =

Scientific classification
- Kingdom: Animalia
- Phylum: Arthropoda
- Clade: Pancrustacea
- Class: Insecta
- Order: Lepidoptera
- Family: Gelechiidae
- Genus: Anasphaltis
- Species: A. renigerellus

Binomial name
- Anasphaltis renigerellus (Zeller, 1839)

Synonyms
- Ypsolophus renigerellus Zeller, 1839

Species of moth

Anasphaltis renigerellus is a moth of the family Gelechiidae. It is found in France, Germany, Switzerland, Austria, Italy, Poland, the Czech Republic, Slovakia, Slovenia, Croatia, Hungary, Romania, Ukraine and Russia.

The larvae feed on Melittis melissophyllum.
