= Sriferia =

Scientific classification
- Kingdom: Animalia
- Phylum: Arthropoda
- Clade: Pancrustacea
- Class: Insecta
- Order: Lepidoptera
- Family: Gelechiidae
- Tribe: Gelechiini
- Genus: Sriferia; Hodges, 1966

Genus of moths

Sriferia is a genus of moth in the family Gelechiidae.

== Species ==
- Sriferia cockerella (Busck, 1903)
- Sriferia fulmenella (Busck, 1910)
- Sriferia oxymeris (Meyrick, 1929)
