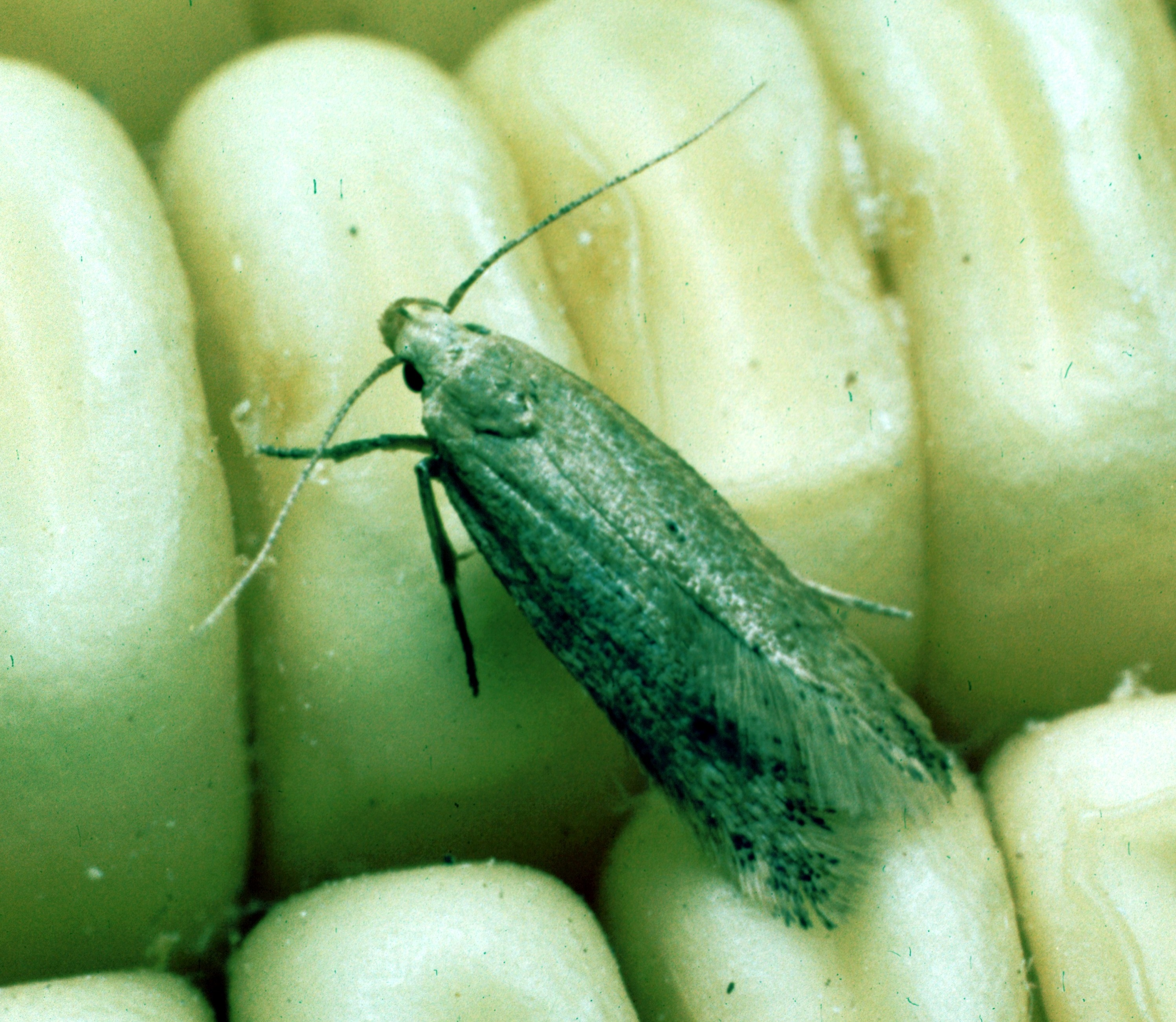
- Sitotroga cerealella

Scientific classification
- Kingdom: Animalia
- Phylum: Arthropoda
- Clade: Pancrustacea
- Class: Insecta
- Order: Lepidoptera
- Family: Gelechiidae
- Genus: Sitotroga; Heinemann 1870

Species
- see text

Synonyms
- Nesolechia Meyrick, 1921; Syngenomictis Meyrick, 1927

= Sitotroga =

Genus of moths

Sitotroga is a genus of moths in the family Gelechiidae.

== Species ==
Species are:

- Sitotroga cerealella (Olivier, 1789) Angoumois grain moth
- Sitotroga exquisita Bidzilya & Mey, 2011
- Sitotroga horogramma (Meyrick, 1921)
- Sitotroga psacasta (Meyrick, 1908)
- Sitotroga pseudopsacasta Ponomarenko & Park, 2007

== Former species ==
- Sitotroga nea

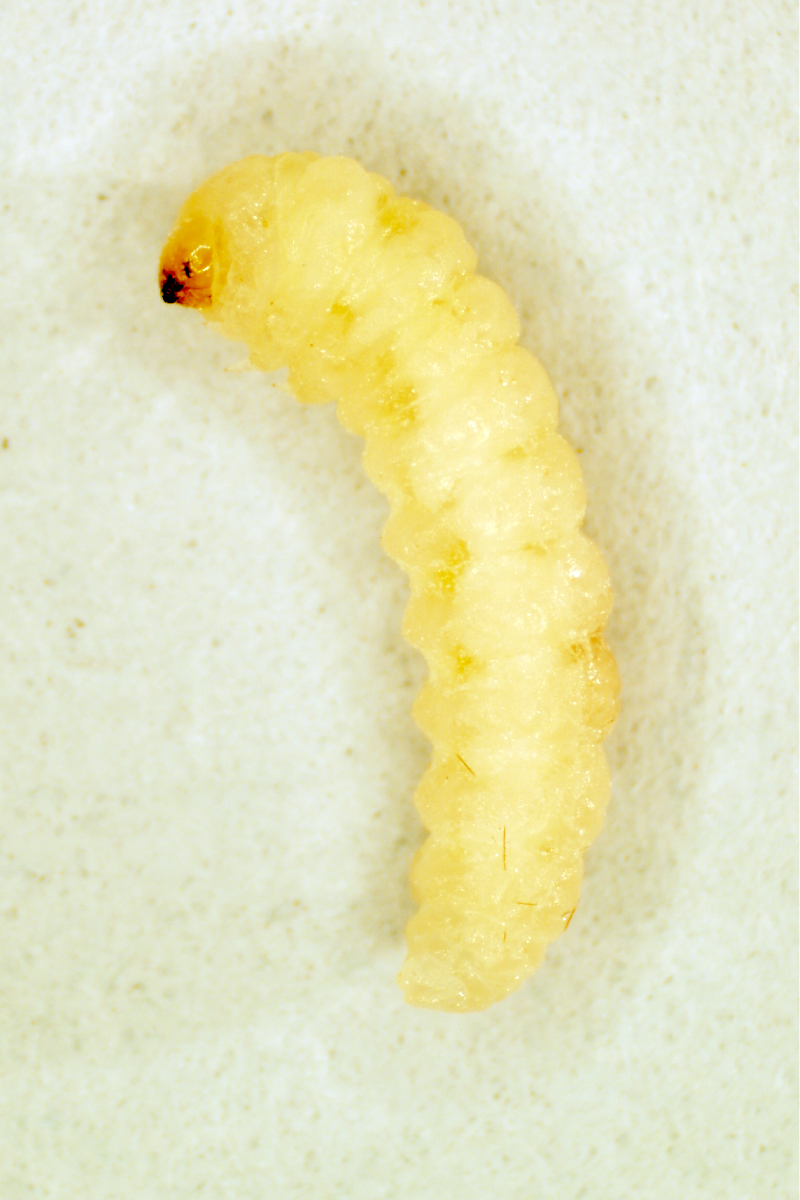
Sitotroga cerealella, larva
