= Scodes =

Scientific classification
- Kingdom: Animalia
- Phylum: Arthropoda
- Clade: Pancrustacea
- Class: Insecta
- Order: Lepidoptera
- Family: Gelechiidae
- Subfamily: Dichomeridinae
- Genus: Scodes; Hodges, 1986
- Species: S. deflecta

Binomial name
- Scodes deflecta (Busck, 1909)

Synonyms
- Dichomeris deflecta Busck, 1909

Genus of moths

Scodes is a genus of moth in the family Gelechiidae. It contains only one species, Scodes deflecta, which is found in the United States, where it has been recorded from Arizona.

The wingspan is about 23 mm. The ground color of the forewings is white, heavily overlaid with light ocherous, fuscous, and blackish scales, the central part of the wing only being nearly unmottled. There is a large round, blackish first discal spot and a small black dot at the end of the cell. The flexus is marked by a few black scales and the veins are indicated by longitudinal blackish-fuscous lines, which terminate in a series of apical spots along the edge of the wing. The hindwings are ocherous fuscous. Adults have been recorded on wing in September.

The larvae feed on Gossypium thurberi.
