= Sclerocopa =

Scientific classification
- Kingdom: Animalia
- Phylum: Arthropoda
- Class: Insecta
- Order: Lepidoptera
- Family: Gelechiidae
- Subfamily: Dichomeridinae
- Genus: Sclerocopa; Meyrick, 1937
- Species: S. heliochra

Binomial name
- Sclerocopa heliochra Meyrick, 1937

Genus of moths

Sclerocopa is a genus of moth in the family Gelechiidae. It contains only one species, Sclerocopa heliochra, which is found in Cameroon.
