= Schneidereria =

Scientific classification
- Domain: Eukaryota
- Kingdom: Animalia
- Phylum: Arthropoda
- Class: Insecta
- Order: Lepidoptera
- Family: Gelechiidae
- Subfamily: Gelechiinae
- Tribe: Litini
- Genus: Schneidereria; Weber, 1957

Genus of moths

Schneidereria is a genus of moth in the family Gelechiidae.

== Species ==
- Schneidereria pistaciella Weber, 1957
- Schneidereria pistaciicola (Danilevski, 1955)
- Schneidereria platyphracta (Meyrick, 1935)
