= Scrobipalpuloides =

Scientific classification
- Kingdom: Animalia
- Phylum: Arthropoda
- Clade: Pancrustacea
- Class: Insecta
- Order: Lepidoptera
- Family: Gelechiidae
- Tribe: Gnorimoschemini
- Genus: Scrobipalpuloides; Povolný, 1987

Genus of moths

Scrobipalpuloides is a genus of moths in the family Gelechiidae.

== Species ==
- Scrobipalpuloides ascendens Povolný, 1990
- Scrobipalpuloides chiquitella (Busck, 1910)
- Scrobipalpuloides chiquitelloides (Powell & Povolný, 2001)
- Scrobipalpuloides congruens Povolný, 1987
- Scrobipalpuloides dispar Povolný, 1990
- Scrobipalpuloides elaborata (Povolný, 2000)
- Scrobipalpuloides habitans Povolný, 1987
- Scrobipalpuloides inapparens Povolný, 1987
- Scrobipalpuloides insularis (Powell & Povolný, 2001)
- Scrobipalpuloides isolata (Povolný, 2000)
- Scrobipalpuloides spinosa (Povolný, 2000)
- Scrobipalpuloides totalis (Povolný, 2000)
- Scrobipalpuloides truncata (Povolný, 2000)
