= Sinoe (moth) =

Scientific classification
- Kingdom: Animalia
- Phylum: Arthropoda
- Clade: Pancrustacea
- Class: Insecta
- Order: Lepidoptera
- Family: Gelechiidae
- Tribe: Litini
- Genus: Sinoe; Chambers, 1873

Genus of moths

Sinoe is a genus of moth in the family Gelechiidae.

== Species ==
- Sinoe capsana Lee & Brambila, 2012
- Sinoe chambersi Lee & Brambila, 2012
- Sinoe kwakae Lee & Brambila, 2012
- Sinoe robiniella (Fitch, 1859)
