= Semophylax =

Scientific classification
- Domain: Eukaryota
- Kingdom: Animalia
- Phylum: Arthropoda
- Class: Insecta
- Order: Lepidoptera
- Family: Gelechiidae
- Subfamily: Gelechiinae
- Genus: Semophylax; Meyrick, 1932

Synonyms
- Aenigma Omelko, 1988 (preocc. Newman, 1836)

Genus of moths

Semophylax is a genus of moth in the family Gelechiidae.

== Species ==
- Semophylax apicepuncta (Busck, 1911)
- Semophylax verecundum (Omelko, 1988)
