= Sphenocrates =

Scientific classification
- Kingdom: Animalia
- Phylum: Arthropoda
- Class: Insecta
- Order: Lepidoptera
- Family: Gelechiidae
- Genus: Sphenocrates; Meyrick, 1925

Genus of moths

Sphenocrates is a genus of moth in the family Gelechiidae.

== Species ==
- Sphenocrates aulodocha (Meyrick, 1918)
- Sphenocrates neptis Diakonoff, 1954
