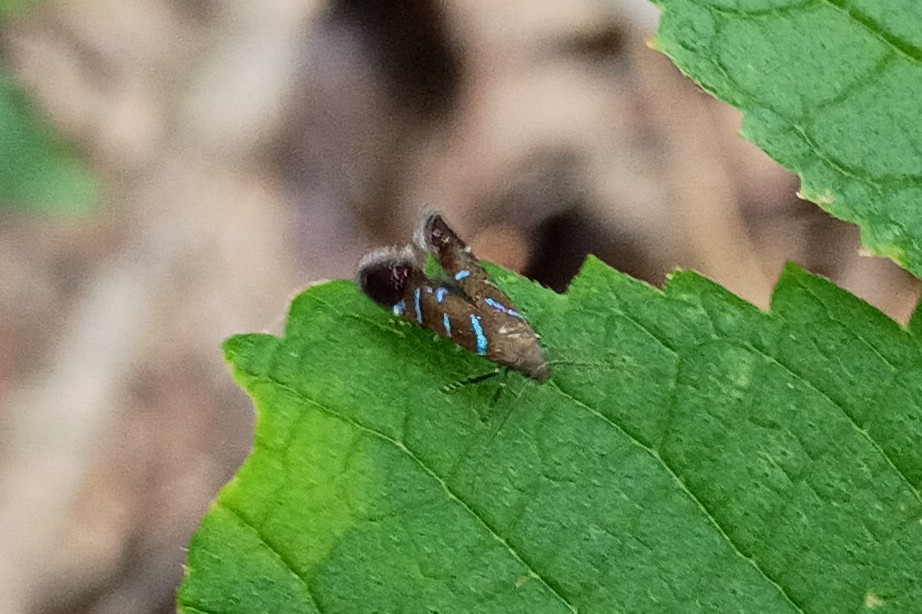
- Strobisia proserpinella

Scientific classification
- Kingdom: Animalia
- Phylum: Arthropoda
- Clade: Pancrustacea
- Class: Insecta
- Order: Lepidoptera
- Family: Gelechiidae
- Subfamily: Anacampsinae
- Genus: Strobisia; Clemens, 1860

Synonyms
- Systasiota Walsingham, 1910

= Strobisia =

Genus of moths

Strobisia is a genus of moth in the family Gelechiidae.

== Species ==
- Strobisia argentifrons Walsingham, 1910
- Strobisia iridipennella Clemens, 1860
- Strobisia leucura (Walsingham, 1910)
- Strobisia proserpinella Frey & Boll, 1878
- Strobisia sapphiritis Meyrick, 1914
- Strobisia spintheropis Meyrick, 1922
- Strobisia stellaris (Felder & Rogenhofer, 1875)
