= Syndesmica =

Scientific classification
- Kingdom: Animalia
- Phylum: Arthropoda
- Clade: Pancrustacea
- Class: Insecta
- Order: Lepidoptera
- Family: Gelechiidae
- Subfamily: Dichomeridinae
- Genus: Syndesmica; Turner, 1919
- Species: S. homogenes

Binomial name
- Syndesmica homogenes Turner, 1919

Genus of moths

Syndesmica is a moth genus. It is here placed in subfamily Dichomeridinae of family Gelechiidae, though some authors assign it to the Autostichinae which belong elsewhere in the Gelechioidea. The genus consists of only one species, Syndesmica homogenes, which is found in Australia, where it has been recorded from Queensland.

The wingspan is 18–19 mm. The forewings are ochreous-grey irrorated with fuscous, more so towards the costa and termen. The dots are fuscous, with the plical before the first discal and the first discal before the middle, the second discal before two-thirds. The hindwings are grey.
