= Symmetrischema symmetrischemoides =

Scientific classification
- Kingdom: Animalia
- Phylum: Arthropoda
- Clade: Pancrustacea
- Class: Insecta
- Order: Lepidoptera
- Family: Gelechiidae
- Subfamily: Gelechiinae
- Genus: Symmetrischema
- Species: S. symmetrischemoides

Binomial name
- Symmetrischema symmetrischemoides (Povolný, 1989)

Synonyms
- Scrobipalpomima symmetrischemoides Povolný, 1989

Species of moth

Symmetrischema symmetrischemoides is a species of gelechiid moth in the family Gelechiidae, found in Argentina.
