= List of gelechiid genera: P =

The large moth family Gelechiidae contains the following genera:

- Pachygeneia
- Palintropa
- Paltoloma
- Palumbina
- Pancoenia
- Panicotricha
- Parabola
- Parachronistis
- Paralida
- Parallactis
- Paranarsia
- Parapodia
- Parapsectris
- Paraschema
- Paraselotis
- Parastega
- Parastenolechia
- Parathectis
- Pauroneura
- Pavolechia
- Pectinophora
- Pelocnistis
- Pelostola
- Perioristica
- Pessograptis
- Petalostomella
- Peucoteles
- Pexicopia
- Phaeotypa
- Phanerophalla
- Pharangitis
- Phloeocecis
- Phloeograptis
- Phobetica
- Photodotis
- Phricogenes
- Phrixocrita
- Phthoracma
- Phthorimaea
- Phylopatris
- Physoptila
- Pilocrates
- Piskunovia
- Pithanurga
- Pityocona
- Platyedra
- Platymacha
- Platyphalla
- Plocamosaris
- Pogochaetia
- Polyhymno
- Porpodryas
- Pragmatodes
- Primischema
- Proadamas
- Procharista
- Proclesis
- Prodosiarcha
- Prolita
- Promolopica
- Proselotis
- Prosodarma
- Prostomeus
- Proteodoxa
- Protolechia
- Protoparachronistis
- Psamathocrita
- Pseudarla
- Pseudathrips
- Pseudochelaria
- Pseudosophronia
- Pseudosymmoca
- Pseudoteleia
- Pseudotelphusa
- Psoricoptera
- Ptilostonychia
- Ptocheuusa
- Ptycerata
- Ptychovalva
- Pycnobathra
- Pycnodytis
- Pyncostola
