= List of gelechiid genera: C =

The large moth family Gelechiidae contains the following genera:

- Cacelice
- Calliphylla
- Calliprora
- Canthonistis
- Capnosema
- Carpatolechia
- Cartericella
- Caryocolum
- Catalexis
- Catameces
- Catatinagma
- Cathegesis
- Caulastrocecis
- Cauloecista
- Cecidonostola
- Celetodes
- Cerofrontia
- Chalcomima
- Chaliniastis
- Charistica
- Chilopselaphus
- Chionodes
- Chlorolychnis
- Chorivalva
- Chretienella
- Chrysoesthia
- Clepsimacha
- Clepsimorpha
- Clistothyris
- Cnaphostola
- Cochlevalva
- Coconympha
- Coleostoma
- Coleotechnites
- Colonanthes
- Coloptilia
- Commatica
- Compsolechia
- Compsosaris
- Coniogyra
- Copticostola
- Corynaea
- Cosmardia
- Coudia
- Coydalla
- Crambodoxa
- Crasimorpha
- Craspedotis
- Cratinitis
- Crypsimaga
- Curvisignella
