= List of gelechiid genera: A =

The large moth family Gelechiidae contains the following genera:

- Acanthophila
- Acompsia
- Acrophiletis
- Acutitornus
- Adelomorpha
- Adoxotricha
- Adullamitis
- Aeolotrocha
- Aerotypia
- Agathactis
- Agnippe
- Agonochaetia
- Allophlebia
- Allotelphusa
- Alsodryas
- Altenia
- Ambloma
- Amblypalpis
- Amblyphylla
- Amphigenes
- Amphitrias
- Anacampsis
- Anapatetris
- Anaptilora
- Anarsia
- Anasphaltis
- Anastomopteryx
- Anastreblotis
- Angustialata
- Angustiphylla
- Anisoplaca
- Anomologa
- Anomoxena
- Anthinora
- Anthistarcha
- Antithyra
- Apatetris
- Aphanostola
- Apocritica
- Apodia
- Aponoea
- Apotactis
- Apothetoeca
- Apotistatus
- Aproaerema
- Araeophalla
- Araeophylla
- Araeovalva
- Ardozyga
- Aregha
- Argolamprotes
- Argophara
- Argyrolacia
- Aristotelia
- Arla
- Aroga
- Arogalea
- Arotria
- Arotromima
- Asapharcha
- Aspades
- Atasthalistis
- Athrips
- Atremaea
- Aulidiotis
- Australiopalpa
- Autodectis
- Axyrostola
