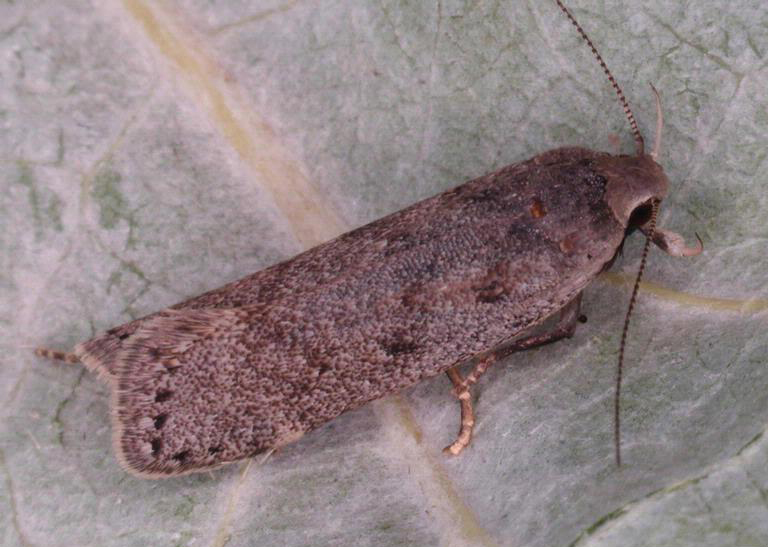
- Anacampsis populella

Scientific classification
- Domain: Eukaryota
- Kingdom: Animalia
- Phylum: Arthropoda
- Class: Insecta
- Order: Lepidoptera
- Family: Gelechiidae
- Subfamily: Anacampsinae; Bruand, 1850

Synonyms
- Anacampsidae Bruand, [1851]; Chelariinae Heslop, 1938; Chelariinae Le Marchand, 1947; Anarsiidae Amsel, 1977; Hypatiminae Kloet & Hincks, 1945

= Anacampsinae =

Subfamily of moths

Anacampsinae is a subfamily of moths in the family Gelechiidae.

== Taxonomy and systematics ==
- Anacampsini Bruand, 1850
  - Anacampsis Curtis, 1827
  - Aproaerema Durrant, 1897
  - Battaristis Meyrick, 1914
  - Chaliniastis Meyrick, 1904
  - Compsolechia Meyrick, 1918
  - Holophysis Walsingham, 1910
  - Idiophantis Meyrick, 1904
  - Iwaruna Gozmány, 1957
  - Leucogoniella T. B. Fletcher, 1940
  - Mesophleps Hübner, [1825]
  - Pauroneura Turner, 1919
  - Pseudosophronia Corley, 2001
  - Scindalmota Turner, 1919
  - Strobisia Clemens, 1860
  - Stomopteryx Heinemann, 1870
  - Syncopacma Meyrick, 1925
  - Tricyanaula Meyrick, 1925
  - Untomia Busck, 1906
- ?Anacampsini
  - Acrophiletis Meyrick, 1932
  - Alsodryas Meyrick, 1914
  - Anastomopteryx Janse, 1951
  - Beltheca Busck, 1914
  - Blastovalva Janse, 1960
  - Calliphylla Janse, 1963
  - Capnosema Janse, 1958
  - Chalcomima Meyrick, 1929
  - Clepsimacha Meyrick, 1934
  - Diastaltica Walsingham, 1910
  - Octonodula Janse, 1951
  - Parabola Janse, 1950
  - Perioristica Walsingham, 1910
  - Promolopica Meyrick, 1925
- Chelariini Le Marchand, 1947
  - Amblyphylla Janse, 1960
  - Anthistarcha Meyrick, 1925
  - Aponoea Walsingham, 1905
  - Axyrostola Meyrick, 1923
  - Bagdadia Amsel, 1949
  - Crasimorpha Meyrick, 1923
  - Dactylethrella T. B. Fletcher, 1940
  - Dendrophilia Ponomarenko, 1993
  - Empalactis Meyrick, 1925
  - Encolapta Meyrick, 1913
  - Ethmiopsis Meyrick in Caradja & Meyrick, 1935
  - Eustalodes Meyrick, 1927
  - Faristenia Ponomarenko, 1991
  - Haplochela Meyrick, 1923
  - Holcophora Staudinger, 1871
  - Hypatima Hübner, [1825]
  - Metatactis Janse, 1949
  - Neofaculta Gozmány, 1955
  - Nothris Hübner, [1825]
  - Oestomorpha Walsingham, 1911
  - Paralida Clarke, 1958
  - Paraselotis Janse, 1960
  - Pessograptis Meyrick, 1923
  - Prostomeus Busck, 1903
  - Pilocrates Meyrick, 1920
  - Ptychovalva Janse, 1958
  - Tornodoxa Meyrick, 1921
- Anarsiini Amsel, 1977 (often included in Chelariini)
  - Anarsia
