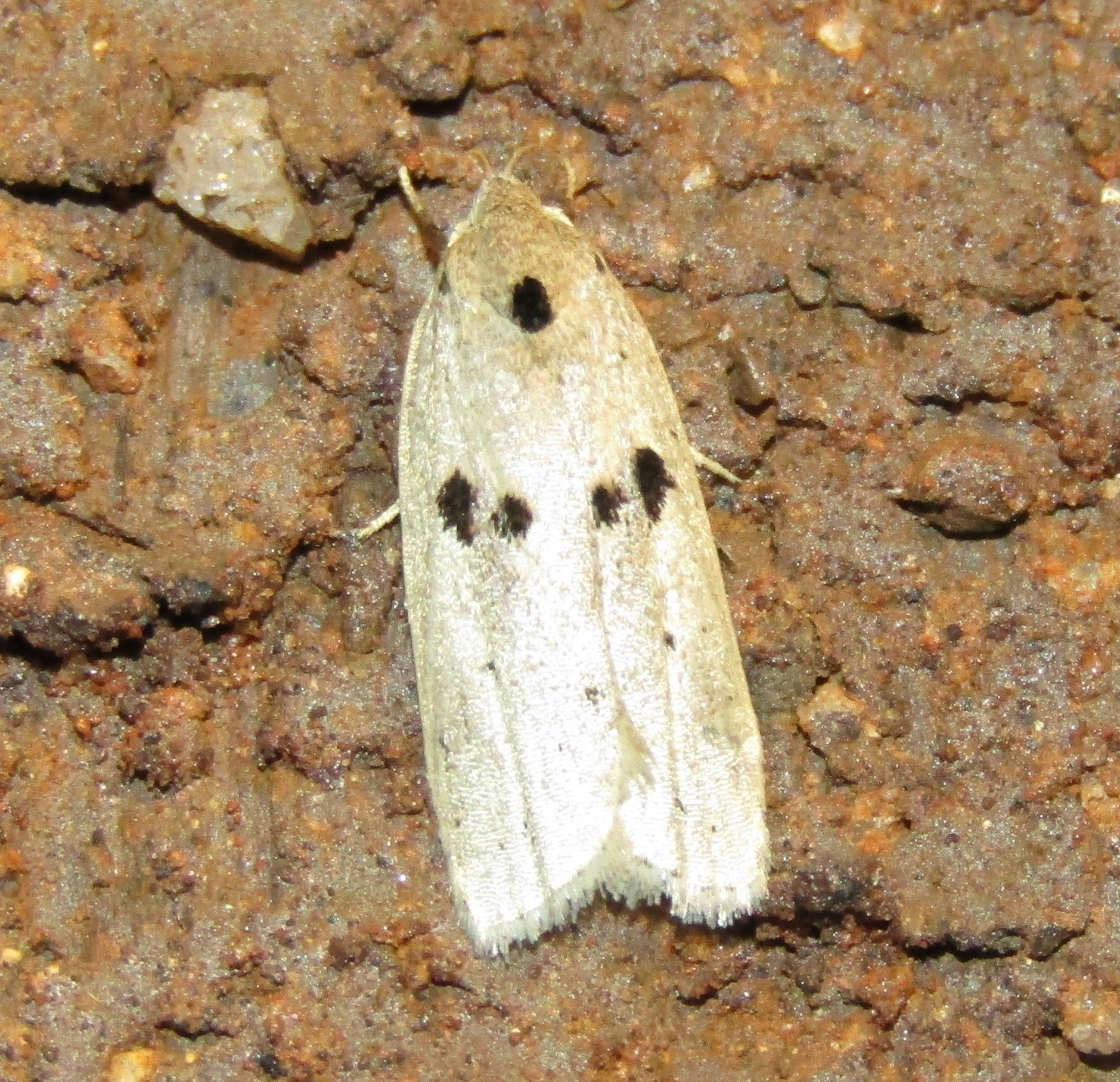
- Odites issikii

Scientific classification
- Kingdom: Animalia
- Phylum: Arthropoda
- Clade: Pancrustacea
- Class: Insecta
- Order: Lepidoptera
- Family: Depressariidae
- Subfamily: Oditinae; Lvovsky, 1996

Synonyms
- Oditini Lvovsky, 1996; Scythropiodini Lvovsky, 1996

= Oditinae =

Subfamily of moths

The Oditinae are a subfamily of small moths in the family Depressariidae.

== Taxonomy and systematics ==
- Amphitrias Meyrick, 1908
- Odites Walsingham, 1891
