= Arbutina =

Arbutina is a Slavic surname. Notable people with the surname include:

- Anđelija Arbutina (born 1967), Serbian basketball player
- Igor Arbutina (born 1972), Croatian volleyball coach

== See also ==
- Pseudochelaria arbutina, a species of moth
