= Commatica phanocrossa =

Scientific classification
- Kingdom: Animalia
- Phylum: Arthropoda
- Class: Insecta
- Order: Lepidoptera
- Family: Gelechiidae
- Genus: Commatica
- Species: C. phanocrossa

Binomial name
- Commatica phanocrossa Meyrick, 1922

Species of moth

Commatica phanocrossa is a moth in the family Gelechiidae. It was described by Edward Meyrick in 1922. It is found in Brazil.

The wingspan is about 10 mm. The forewings are whitish ochreous, with the anterior half of the costa suffused with white. The plical and second discal stigmata are represented by elongate dark brown marks and approximated and there is a dark brown suboblique dash in the disc beyond these, as well as a dark brown streak along the costa from the middle to the apex, attenuated to the extremities, cut by a very oblique fine white striga from two-thirds, and marked with a black spot at the apex. There is also a narrow white terminal streak preceded by a few brownish scales and including three blackish dots. The hindwings are dark grey.
