= Commatica extremella =

Scientific classification
- Kingdom: Animalia
- Phylum: Arthropoda
- Class: Insecta
- Order: Lepidoptera
- Family: Gelechiidae
- Genus: Commatica
- Species: C. extremella

Binomial name
- Commatica extremella (Walker, 1864)

Synonyms
- Gelechia extremella Walker, 1864

Species of moth

Commatica extremella is a moth in the family Gelechiidae. It was described by Francis Walker in 1864. It is found in Amazonas, Brazil.

Adults are dark cupreous brown, the forewings with a slender silvery streak, which extends from three-fourths of the length of the costa to the end of the exterior border. There is a white point at the tip of the costa. The hindwings are very narrow.
