= Beltheca =

Scientific classification
- Domain: Eukaryota
- Kingdom: Animalia
- Phylum: Arthropoda
- Class: Insecta
- Order: Lepidoptera
- Family: Gelechiidae
- Subfamily: Anacampsinae
- Genus: Beltheca; Busck, 1914

Synonyms
- Anterethista Meyrick, 1914

Genus of moths

Beltheca is a genus of moth in the family Gelechiidae.

== Species ==
- Beltheca oni Kawahara & Adamski, 2006
- Beltheca phosphoropa (Meyrick, 1922)
- Beltheca picolella Busck, 1914 [=Anterethista heteractis Meyrick, 1914]
