= Parastega niveisignella =

Scientific classification
- Kingdom: Animalia
- Phylum: Arthropoda
- Clade: Pancrustacea
- Class: Insecta
- Order: Lepidoptera
- Family: Gelechiidae
- Genus: Parastega
- Species: P. niveisignella

Binomial name
- Parastega niveisignella (Zeller, 1877)

Synonyms
- Psoricoptera niveisignella Zeller, 1877; Parastega curvatella Busck, 1914

Species of moth

Parastega niveisignella is a moth in the family Gelechiidae. It was described by Philipp Christoph Zeller in 1877. It is found in Panama, Colombia and Peru.

The wingspan is 12–14 mm. The forewings are blackish brown with a purple sheen. A narrow white streak runs from the basal fifth of the costa obliquely outwards and downwards to the fold and is continued much attenuated and obscurely beyond the fold outwardly in a shallow curve. There is an interrupted, light brown, longitudinal streak on the fold and a small white costal spot at the apical fifth. The hindwings are dark fuscous.
