= Commatica pterygota =

Scientific classification
- Kingdom: Animalia
- Phylum: Arthropoda
- Class: Insecta
- Order: Lepidoptera
- Family: Gelechiidae
- Genus: Commatica
- Species: C. pterygota

Binomial name
- Commatica pterygota Meyrick, 1929

Species of moth

Commatica pterygota is a moth in the family Gelechiidae. It was described by Edward Meyrick in 1929. It is found in Amazonas, Brazil.
