= Charistica iriantha =

Scientific classification
- Domain: Eukaryota
- Kingdom: Animalia
- Phylum: Arthropoda
- Class: Insecta
- Order: Lepidoptera
- Family: Gelechiidae
- Genus: Charistica
- Species: C. iriantha

Binomial name
- Charistica iriantha (Meyrick, 1914)

Synonyms
- Zalithia iriantha Meyrick, 1914

Species of moth

Charistica iriantha is a moth in the family Gelechiidae. It was described by Edward Meyrick in 1914. It is found in Guyana and Peru.

The wingspan is 12–13 mm. The forewings are black, but from the base to the middle except on the margins the wing is suffused with metallic blue on the costal half, metallic green on the dorsal half, with a small yellow subcostal spot near the base, and sometimes another at one-fourth. There is a yellow elongate blotch extending along the costa from the middle to three-fourths, enclosing a metallic-blue streak and there is also a small irregular yellow spot in the middle of the disc. A shining blue-purple trapezoidal blotch is found on the dorsum towards the tornus, reaching half across wing, the upper posterior angle acute, the upper anterior angle connected with a costal yellow blotch by a blue mark. The wing beyond these markings is wholly coppery-red. The hindwings are dark fuscous.
