= Commatica acropelta =

Scientific classification
- Kingdom: Animalia
- Phylum: Arthropoda
- Clade: Pancrustacea
- Class: Insecta
- Order: Lepidoptera
- Family: Gelechiidae
- Genus: Commatica
- Species: C. acropelta

Binomial name
- Commatica acropelta Meyrick, 1914

Species of moth

Commatica acropelta is a moth in the family Gelechiidae. It was described by Edward Meyrick in 1914. It is found in Guyana, Brazil and Peru.

The wingspan is 9–10 mm. The forewings are dark fuscous with a fine white oblique strigula from three-fourths of the costa almost to the termen above the middle, the apical area beyond this light brownish-ochreous, with four white marginal dots. The hindwings are dark fuscous, rather lighter towards the base.
