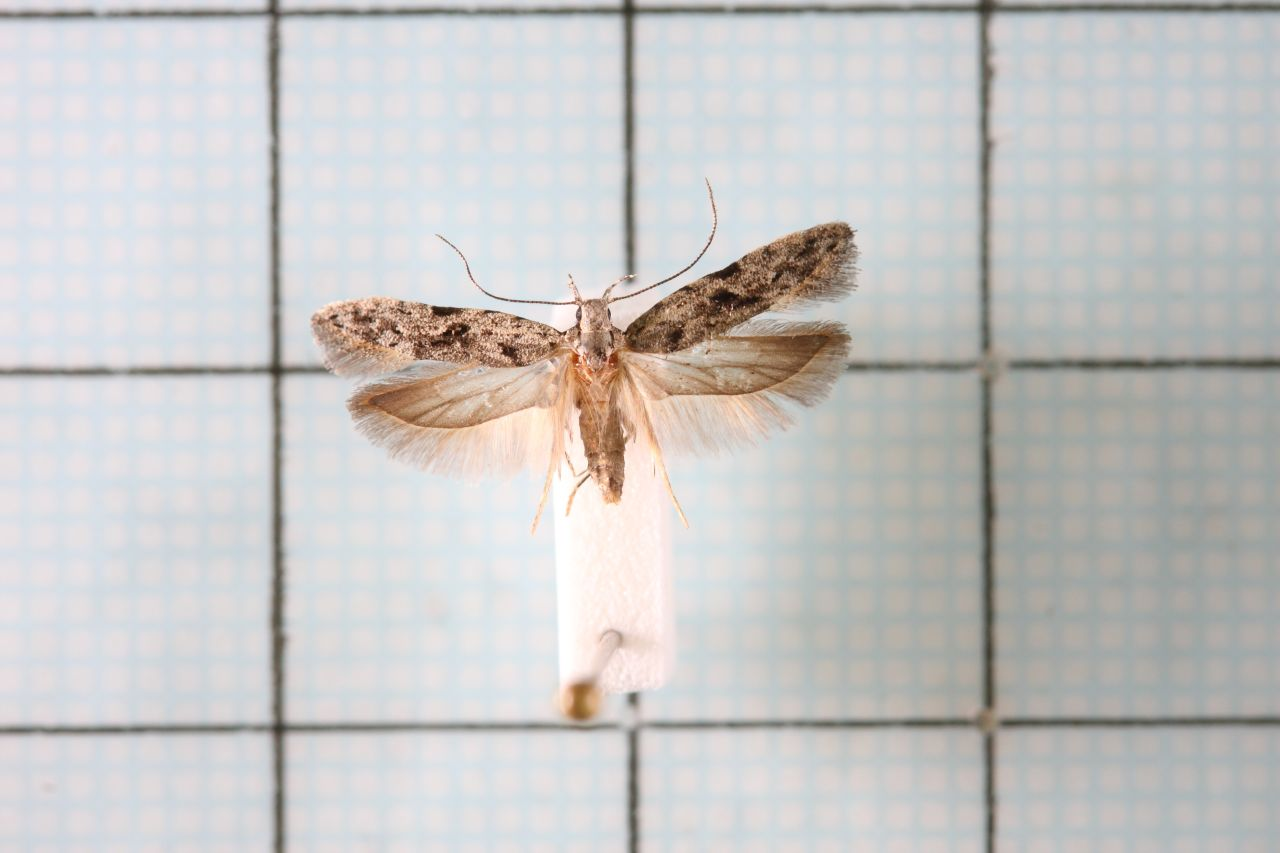

Scientific classification
- Kingdom: Animalia
- Phylum: Arthropoda
- Class: Insecta
- Order: Lepidoptera
- Family: Gelechiidae
- Genus: Tornodoxa
- Species: T. leptopalta

Binomial name
- Tornodoxa leptopalta (Meyrick, 1934)

Synonyms
- Chelaria leptopalta Meyrick, 1934; Hypatima leptopalta; Homochelas leptopalta

= Tornodoxa leptopalta =

Species of moth

Tornodoxa leptopalta is a moth in the family Gelechiidae. It is found in Taiwan.
