= Holophysis tentatella =

Scientific classification
- Kingdom: Animalia
- Phylum: Arthropoda
- Class: Insecta
- Order: Lepidoptera
- Family: Gelechiidae
- Genus: Holophysis
- Species: H. tentatella

Binomial name
- Holophysis tentatella (Walker, 1864)

Synonyms
- Gelechia tentatella Walker, 1864

Species of moth

Holophysis tentatella is a moth of the family Gelechiidae. It was described by Francis Walker in 1864. It is found in Amazonas, Brazil.

Adults are cupreous, the forewings with a broad ochraceous middle band and six broad chalybeous (steel-blue) streaks, four of which are between the band and the base of the wing. The fifth intersects the exterior part of the band and extends to the interior angle and the sixth is in the submarginal disc. Two slender chalybeous lines extend obliquely from the costa and intersect the outer part of the band, and are accompanied by two shorter white lines.
