= Alsodryas prasinoptila =

Scientific classification
- Kingdom: Animalia
- Phylum: Arthropoda
- Class: Insecta
- Order: Lepidoptera
- Family: Gelechiidae
- Genus: Alsodryas
- Species: A. prasinoptila

Binomial name
- Alsodryas prasinoptila Meyrick, 1922

Species of moth

Alsodryas prasinoptila is a species of moth in the family Gelechiidae. It was described by Edward Meyrick in 1922. It is found in Brazil.

The wingspan is about 15 mm. The forewings are green, with the tips of the scales whitish. There are large subcostal and subdorsal tufts at one-fourth and smaller tufts mixed dark grey representing the stigmata, the plical hardly before the first discal. There is a paler shade from three-fourths of the costa to the dorsum before the tornus, very obtusely angulated in the middle, the upper half slightly sinuate, some dark grey irroration beyond the angle. There are also cloudy blackish-grey marginal dots around the posterior part of the costa and termen. The hindwings are dark fuscous.
