= Leucogoniella =

Scientific classification
- Domain: Eukaryota
- Kingdom: Animalia
- Phylum: Arthropoda
- Class: Insecta
- Order: Lepidoptera
- Family: Gelechiidae
- Tribe: Anacampsini
- Genus: Leucogoniella; T. B. Fletcher, 1940

Synonyms
- Leucogonia Meyrick, 1929 (preocc. Hampson, 1910)

Genus of moths

Leucogoniella is a genus of moths in the family Gelechiidae described by Thomas Bainbrigge Fletcher in 1940.

== Species ==
- Leucogoniella californica (Keifer, 1930)
- Leucogoniella distincta (Keifer, 1935)
- Leucogoniella subsimella (Clemens, 1860)
