= Beltheca oni =

Scientific classification
- Kingdom: Animalia
- Phylum: Arthropoda
- Clade: Pancrustacea
- Class: Insecta
- Order: Lepidoptera
- Family: Gelechiidae
- Genus: Beltheca
- Species: B. oni

Binomial name
- Beltheca oni Kawahara & Adamski, 2006

Species of moth

Beltheca oni is a moth of the family Gelechiidae. It was described by Kawahara and Adamski in 2006. It is found in Costa Rica.

The length of the forewings is 3.5-4.6 mm.
