= Commatica palirrhoa =

Scientific classification
- Kingdom: Animalia
- Phylum: Arthropoda
- Class: Insecta
- Order: Lepidoptera
- Family: Gelechiidae
- Genus: Commatica
- Species: C. palirrhoa

Binomial name
- Commatica palirrhoa Meyrick, 1922

Species of moth

Commatica palirrhoa is a moth in the family Gelechiidae. It was described by Edward Meyrick in 1922. It is found in Peru and Amazonas, Brazil.

The wingspan is 9–10 mm. The forewings are light greyish ochreous, on the posterior half irrorated (sprinkled) with dark grey with a blackish costal streak from before the middle to the apex, broad towards four-fifths but finely attenuated anteriorly and shortly pointed posteriorly, cut by a very oblique fine white striga from three-fourths. The plical stigma is sometimes blackish and there is a streak of whitish suffusion along the termen from the tornus, not reaching the apex but expanded into an irregular projection before it. There are two or three indistinct dark terminal dots. The hindwings are grey.
