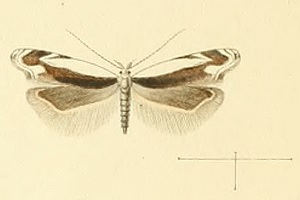

Scientific classification
- Domain: Eukaryota
- Kingdom: Animalia
- Phylum: Arthropoda
- Class: Insecta
- Order: Lepidoptera
- Family: Gelechiidae
- Genus: Pseudosophronia
- Species: P. cosmella

Binomial name
- Pseudosophronia cosmella (Constant, 1885)

Synonyms
- Sophronia cosmella Constant, 1885

= Pseudosophronia cosmella =

Species of moth

Pseudosophronia cosmella is a moth of the family Gelechiidae. It was described by Constant in 1885. It is found in Portugal, Spain and on Corsica.
