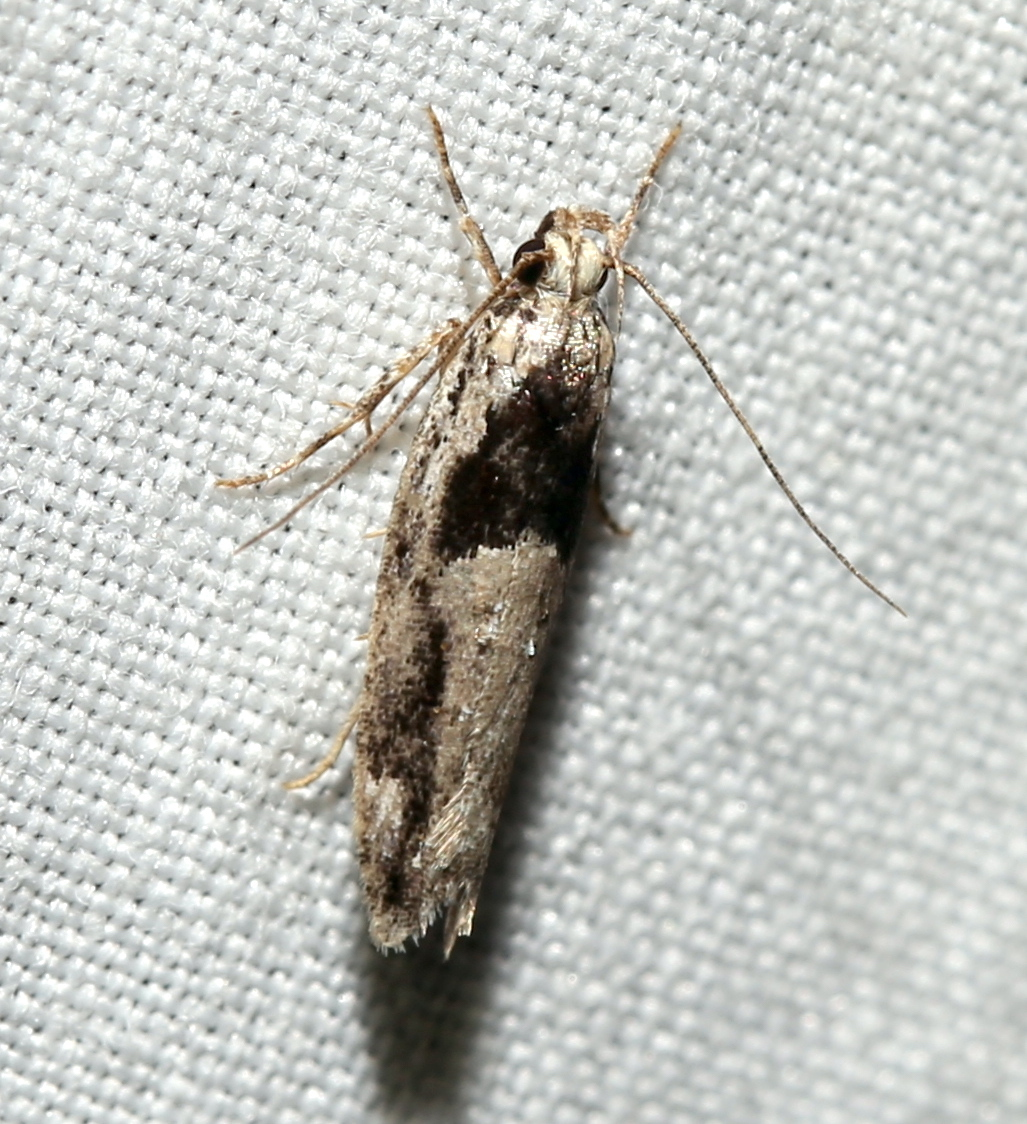

Scientific classification
- Kingdom: Animalia
- Phylum: Arthropoda
- Class: Insecta
- Order: Lepidoptera
- Family: Gelechiidae
- Genus: Pseudochelaria
- Species: P. pennsylvanica

Binomial name
- Pseudochelaria pennsylvanica Dietz, 1900

Synonyms
- Gelechia pennsylvanica

= Pseudochelaria pennsylvanica =

Species of moth

Pseudochelaria pennsylvanica is a moth of the family Gelechiidae. It was described by Dietz in 1900. It is found in North America, where it has been recorded from Arizona, Illinois, Kentucky, North Carolina, Ohio, Pennsylvania, Tennessee and West Virginia.
