= Eustalodes oenosema =

Scientific classification
- Domain: Eukaryota
- Kingdom: Animalia
- Phylum: Arthropoda
- Class: Insecta
- Order: Lepidoptera
- Family: Gelechiidae
- Genus: Eustalodes
- Species: E. oenosema

Binomial name
- Eustalodes oenosema Meyrick, 1927

Species of moth

Eustalodes oenosema is a moth in the family Gelechiidae. It was described by Edward Meyrick in 1927. It is found on Samoa.
