= Paralida balanaspis =

Scientific classification
- Kingdom: Animalia
- Phylum: Arthropoda
- Class: Insecta
- Order: Lepidoptera
- Family: Gelechiidae
- Genus: Paralida
- Species: P. balanaspis

Binomial name
- Paralida balanaspis (Meyrick, 1930)

Synonyms
- Chelaria balanaspis Meyrick, 1930; Hypatima balanaspis

Species of moth

Paralida balanaspis is a moth in the family Gelechiidae. It was described by Edward Meyrick in 1930. It is found in Thailand and Vietnam.

The wingspan is about 15 mm.
