= Commatica nerterodes =

Scientific classification
- Kingdom: Animalia
- Phylum: Arthropoda
- Class: Insecta
- Order: Lepidoptera
- Family: Gelechiidae
- Genus: Commatica
- Species: C. nerterodes

Binomial name
- Commatica nerterodes Meyrick, 1914

Species of moth

Commatica nerterodes is a moth in the family Gelechiidae. It was described by Edward Meyrick in 1914. It is found in Guyana.

The wingspan is about 9 mm. The forewings are dark purplish grey with a thick blackish costal streak from near the base to the apex, cut at one-third by an oblique mark of ground colour sprinkled with whitish, and by oblique white strigulae beyond the middle and at three-fourths, from the second of which a fine strongly curved whitish subterminal line runs to the tornus. There is an oblique mark across the fold at one-fourth and the stigmata are obscurely blackish and indistinct, with the second discal edged with two or three white scales. There is some whitish irroration (sprinkling) towards the dorsum beyond the middle, and between the subterminal line and termen, as well as a white dot on the costa towards the apex. The hindwings are dark fuscous.
