= Alsodryas deltochlora =

Scientific classification
- Domain: Eukaryota
- Kingdom: Animalia
- Phylum: Arthropoda
- Class: Insecta
- Order: Lepidoptera
- Family: Gelechiidae
- Genus: Alsodryas
- Species: A. deltochlora

Binomial name
- Alsodryas deltochlora Meyrick, 1922

Species of moth

Alsodryas deltochlora is a species of moth in the family Gelechiidae. It was described by Edward Meyrick in 1922. It is found in Brazil.

The wingspan is about 16 mm. The forewings are dull green with a small black spot on the base of the costa and small tufts above and below the middle at one-fifth, and one on the costa rather beyond these. There is a triangular black blotch on the middle of the costa, not reaching half across wing. There are small tufts representing the stigmata, the plical somewhat before the first discal, which adjoins the apex of the costal blotch, small linear black dots beneath the plical and second discal. There is an irregular line of faint whitish irroration from three-fourths of the costa to the dorsum before the tornus, rather angulated in the middle and somewhat incurved on both halves, preceded on the costa and dorsum by small spots of blackish suffusion. There is also an interrupted black line along the termen. The hindwings are dark fuscous.
