= Charistica porphyraspis =

Scientific classification
- Domain: Eukaryota
- Kingdom: Animalia
- Phylum: Arthropoda
- Class: Insecta
- Order: Lepidoptera
- Family: Gelechiidae
- Genus: Charistica
- Species: C. porphyraspis

Binomial name
- Charistica porphyraspis (Meyrick, 1909)

Synonyms
- Strobisia porphyraspis Meyrick, 1909

Species of moth

Charistica porphyraspis is a moth in the family Gelechiidae. It was described by Edward Meyrick in 1909. It is found in Bolivia.

The wingspan is about 11 mm. The forewings are dark bronzy fuscous with the markings brilliant blue metallic, with green and purple iridescence. There is a spot on the base of the costa and an angulated transverse line at one-fifth, not reaching the dorsum, as well as a slightly curved entire transverse line slightly before the middle and two transverse linear marks in the disc beyond the middle, rather converging upwards, and a dot on the fold beneath them. An inwardly oblique mark is found from the costa at two-thirds and there is a large bright purple patch on the lower part of the termen, extending from the tornus to above the middle. The hindwings are dark fuscous.
