= Holophysis autodesma =

Scientific classification
- Kingdom: Animalia
- Phylum: Arthropoda
- Class: Insecta
- Order: Lepidoptera
- Family: Gelechiidae
- Genus: Holophysis
- Species: H. autodesma

Binomial name
- Holophysis autodesma (Meyrick, 1918)

Synonyms
- Zalithia autodesma Meyrick, 1918

Species of moth

Holophysis autodesma is a moth of the family Gelechiidae. It was described by Edward Meyrick in 1918. It is found in Colombia.

The wingspan is 10–11 mm. The forewings are blackish with leaden-metallic markings, tinged pale bluish. There is a basal patch, narrow on the costa but confluent with an oblique-triangular costal blotch beyond it, dilated downwards and extended along the dorsum to connect with the median fascia. A moderate fascia is found from the middle of the costa to beyond the middle of the dorsum, narrow on the costa and dilated dorsally, containing an oblique blackish striga in the disc. There is a short fine oblique streak from the costa at three-fourths, white on the costa. An irregular transverse blotch is found from the lower part of the termen, reaching more than halfway across the wing. The hindwings are dark fuscous, in males with some long dark grey hairs lying beneath the costa on the basal two-fifths.
