= Diastaltica =

Scientific classification
- Kingdom: Animalia
- Phylum: Arthropoda
- Class: Insecta
- Order: Lepidoptera
- Family: Gelechiidae
- Subfamily: Anacampsinae
- Genus: Diastaltica; Walsingham, 1910
- Species: D. separabilis

Binomial name
- Diastaltica separabilis Walsingham, 1910

Genus of moths

Diastaltica is a genus of moths in the family Gelechiidae. It contains the species Diastaltica separabilis, which is found in Guatemala.

The moth's wingspan is about 13 mm (0.51 in) and its forewings are dark bronzy brown. A pale aeneous band, commencing at the base of the costa, is dilated downward to the dorsum, and continued outward along it to the middle, where it is turned upward to the fold, joining the inner branch of a shining steel-grey furcate fascia, which, descending from the costa, scarcely beyond the middle, encloses an elongate, transverse, brown spot, near its outer side on the cell. This is preceded, halfway to the base, by an outwardly oblique, shining, steel-grey, metallic, cuneiform costal blotch. A sinuate band of the same colour commences with the costal cilia, suddenly angulated outward below them, and diffused along the lower half of the termen between the outer and the central fascia, as also on the dorsum between the forks of the latter, the dark ground-colour is thickly sprinkled with golden-brown scales. The terminal cilia is whitish cinereous, with a pure white patch below the apex, a dark brown line along their base. The costal and tornal cilia are brown. The hindwings are dull brown.
