= Compsosaris testacea =

Scientific classification
- Domain: Eukaryota
- Kingdom: Animalia
- Phylum: Arthropoda
- Class: Insecta
- Order: Lepidoptera
- Family: Gelechiidae
- Genus: Compsosaris
- Species: C. testacea

Binomial name
- Compsosaris testacea Meyrick, 1914

Species of moth

Compsosaris testacea is a moth in the family Gelechiidae. It was described by Edward Meyrick in 1914. It is found in Guyana.

The wingspan is 8–9 mm. The forewings are ochreous whitish with three oblique wedge-shaped ochreous-brown or deep yellow-ochreous patches on the costa, blackish on the costal margin, the first towards the base, less marked, the second before the middle, the third at about three-fourths, sometimes extended almost to the termen, and marked in the disc with a fine black dash, the two latter edged posteriorly by clear white strigulae. The discal stigmata are black and there is a suffused ochreous spot on the fold at one-fourth, a larger one beneath the first discal, and one more elongate and distinct between the first and second discal. A triangular grey tornal spot is found beneath the second discal, edged anteriorly with some black scales and the apical portion of the costa is suffused with ochreous. The hindwings are grey.
