= Parastega trichella =

Scientific classification
- Domain: Eukaryota
- Kingdom: Animalia
- Phylum: Arthropoda
- Class: Insecta
- Order: Lepidoptera
- Family: Gelechiidae
- Genus: Parastega
- Species: P. trichella

Binomial name
- Parastega trichella Busck, 1914

Species of moth

Parastega trichella is a moth in the family Gelechiidae. It was described by August Busck in 1914. It is found in Panama.

The wingspan is about 11 mm. The forewings are blackish brown with strong purple sheen and at the basal fourth a narrow, outwardly oblique, straight, silvery-white streak. There is a small triangular outwardly pointed white costal streak at the apical fourth. The hindwings are dark fuscous.
