= Beltheca picolella =

Scientific classification
- Domain: Eukaryota
- Kingdom: Animalia
- Phylum: Arthropoda
- Class: Insecta
- Order: Lepidoptera
- Family: Gelechiidae
- Genus: Beltheca
- Species: B. picolella

Binomial name
- Beltheca picolella Busck, 1914

Synonyms
- Anterethista heteractis Meyrick, 1914

Species of moth

Beltheca picolella is a moth of the family Gelechiidae. It was described by August Busck in 1914. It is found in Panama, Guyana, Brazil and Peru.

The wingspan is 9–10 mm. The forewings are blackish brown with a thin outwardly oblique white streaklet just beyond the middle of the costa and with two triangular white dashes just before the apex. There are a few scattered white scales at the end of the cell and on the fold. The hindwings are blackish fuscous with a bluish cast.
