= Charistica walkeri =

Scientific classification
- Domain: Eukaryota
- Kingdom: Animalia
- Phylum: Arthropoda
- Class: Insecta
- Order: Lepidoptera
- Family: Gelechiidae
- Genus: Charistica
- Species: C. walkeri

Binomial name
- Charistica walkeri (Walsingham, 1911)

Synonyms
- Strobisia walkeri Walsingham, 1911; Zalithia euphracta Meyrick, 1914

Species of moth

Charistica walkeri is a moth in the family Gelechiidae. It was described by Thomas de Grey, 6th Baron Walsingham, in 1911. It is found from Panama to Colombia.

The wingspan is about 12 mm. The forewings have a leaden grey basal patch, merging outwardly into tawny purplish fuscous, which reaches to one-third and is bounded on the costa by a cuneiform white costal streak, while from its lower half it sends obliquely upward a sharp steel-grey tooth-like projection into the deep brownish orange band which succeeds it. From each extremity of the white costal streak a dark steel-grey point also projects outward and the broad orange band into which these project is bounded a little beyond the middle of the wing by a rather oblique bright steel-grey fascia, narrowly margined on either side by black, and rather wider on the dorsum than on the costa. This again is succeeded by a deep reddish orange fascia, narrower than the preceding orange band, but somewhat produced outward on the dorsum. Above this dorsal extension is a deep blackish patch extending to the costa and produced outward nearly to the apex, this contains a pair of rather converging silvery white costal streaks and a small spot of steel-grey towards its lower extremity, the space beyond it to the apex and termen, including the cilia, being rich shining purple. The hindwings are dark coppery brown.
