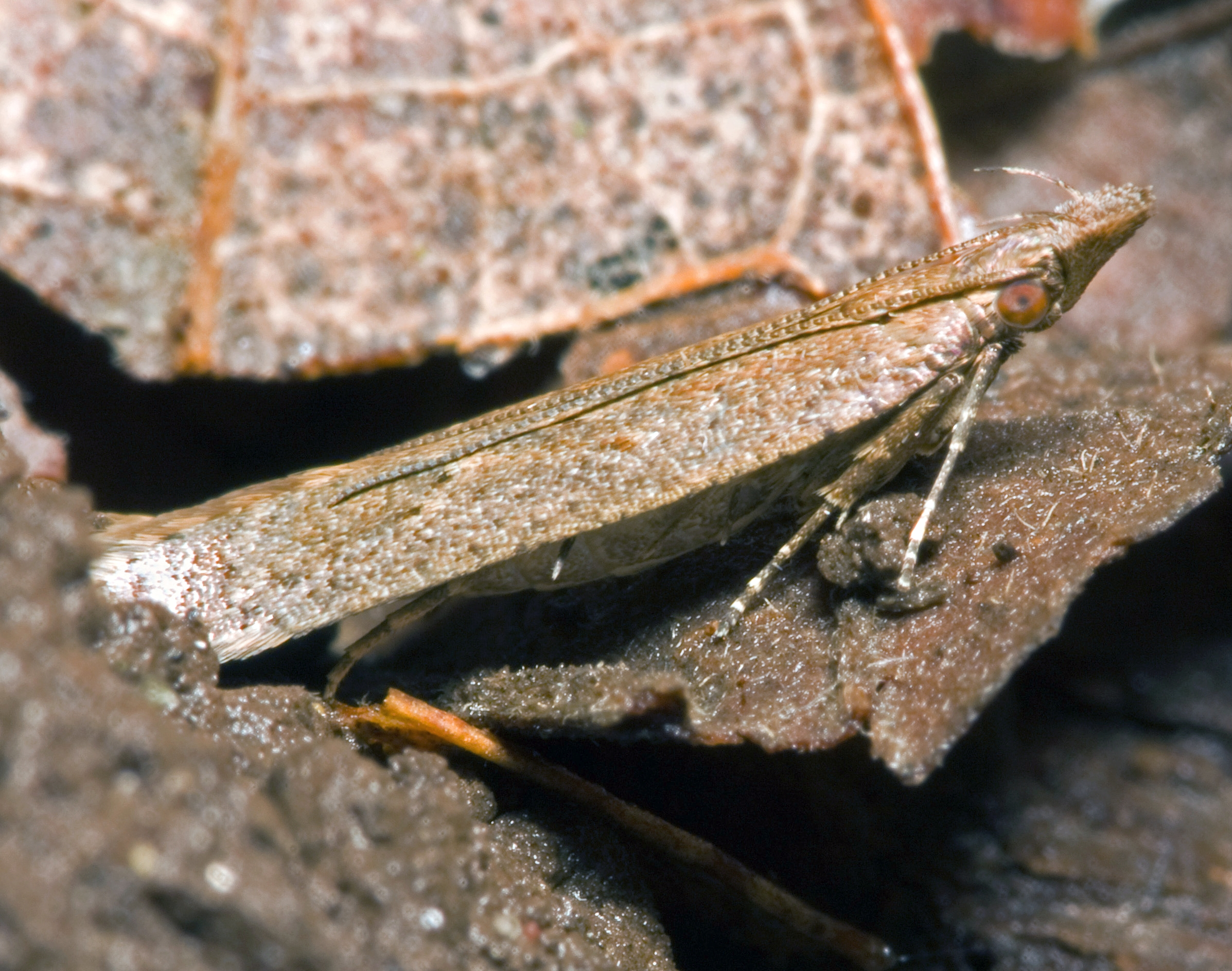
- Dichomeris ligulella

Scientific classification
- Domain: Eukaryota
- Kingdom: Animalia
- Phylum: Arthropoda
- Class: Insecta
- Order: Lepidoptera
- Family: Gelechiidae
- Genus: Arla
- Species: A. tenuicornis

Binomial name
- Arla tenuicornis Clarke, 1942

= Arla tenuicornis =

Species of moth

Arla tenuicornis is a moth of the family Gelechiidae. It is found in the United States from Washington to California.

The wingspan is 17–23 mm. The forewings are luteous (yellowish), profusely irrorated (speckled) with fuscous, the surface of the wing appearing dull light brown. There are three fuscous spots. The hindwings are fuscous.
