= Holophysis xanthostoma =

Scientific classification
- Domain: Eukaryota
- Kingdom: Animalia
- Phylum: Arthropoda
- Class: Insecta
- Order: Lepidoptera
- Family: Gelechiidae
- Genus: Holophysis
- Species: H. xanthostoma

Binomial name
- Holophysis xanthostoma Walsingham, 1910

Species of moth

Holophysis xanthostoma is a moth of the family Gelechiidae. It was described by Thomas de Grey, 6th Baron Walsingham, in 1910. It is found in Mexico (Guerrero).

The wingspan is about 9 mm. The forewings are dark bronzy brown, shading into shining brassy metallic along the dorsum below the fold, and in a broad oblique terminal band. Two shining pale aeneous costal spots, one near the base, the other a little before the middle, are followed by two minute white costal dots, one about the middle, the other beyond. The hindwings are brown, paler than the forewings.
