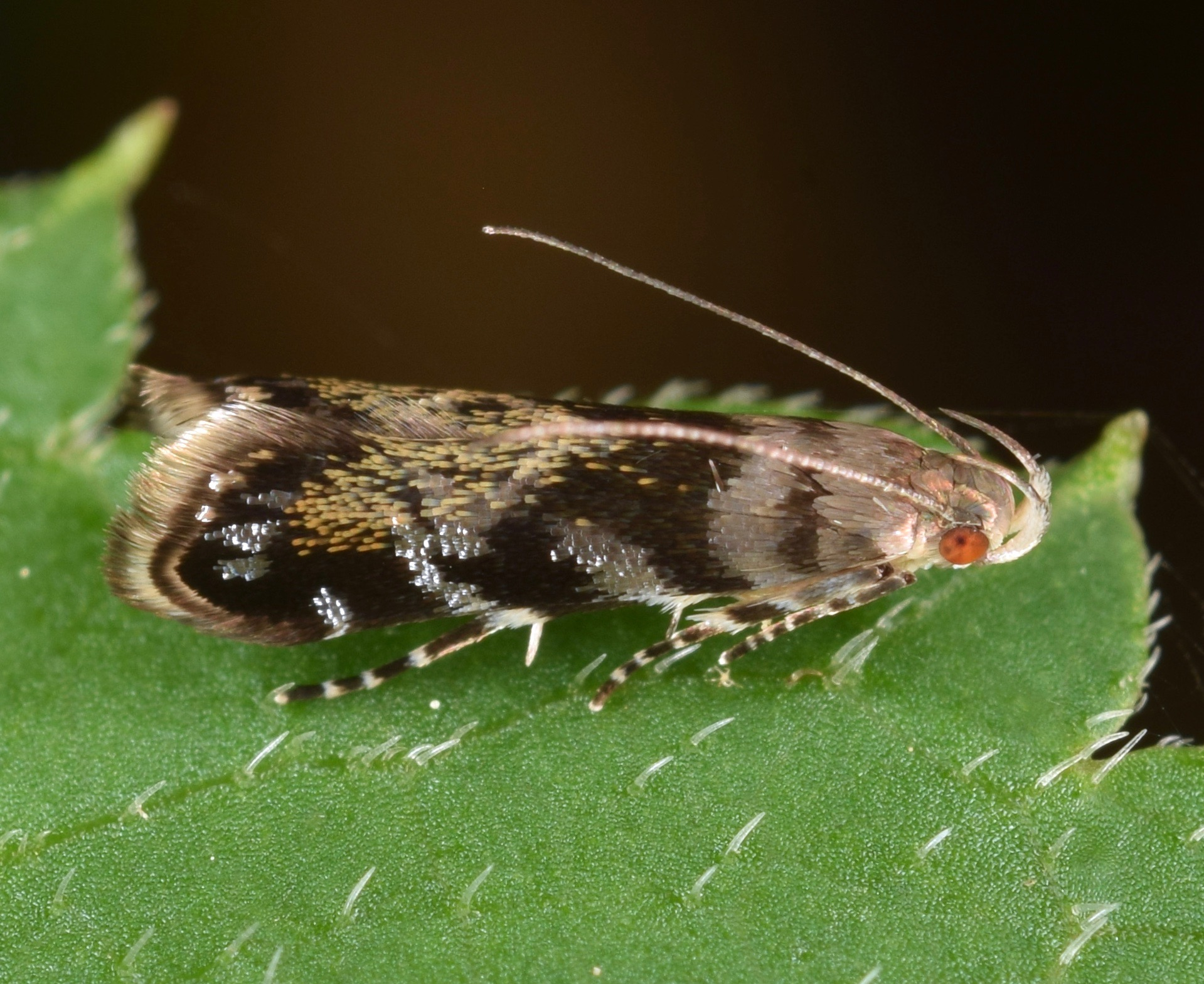

Scientific classification
- Kingdom: Animalia
- Phylum: Arthropoda
- Clade: Pancrustacea
- Class: Insecta
- Order: Lepidoptera
- Family: Gelechiidae
- Genus: Holophysis
- Species: H. emblemella

Binomial name
- Holophysis emblemella (Clemens, 1860)

Synonyms
- Strobisia emblemella Clemens, 1860; Strobisia venustella Chambers, 1872

= Holophysis emblemella =

Species of moth

Holophysis emblemella is a moth of the family Gelechiidae. It was described by James Brackenridge Clemens in 1860. It is found in North America, where it has been recorded from New York south to Florida. Records include Alabama, Illinois, Maryland, Mississippi, North Carolina, Pennsylvania, South Carolina, Tennessee, Wisconsin, Kentucky and Ohio.
