= Commatica hexacentra =

Scientific classification
- Kingdom: Animalia
- Phylum: Arthropoda
- Class: Insecta
- Order: Lepidoptera
- Family: Gelechiidae
- Genus: Commatica
- Species: C. hexacentra

Binomial name
- Commatica hexacentra Meyrick, 1922

Species of moth

Commatica hexacentra is a moth in the family Gelechiidae. It was described by Edward Meyrick in 1922. It is found in Amazonas, Brazil.

The wingspan is about 9 mm. The forewings are dark grey, becoming dark bronzy fuscous towards the costa posteriorly. There is a very fine whitish line from a white mark on the costa at two-thirds to the dorsum before the tornus, acutely angled in the middle, both halves straight and very oblique. There are three white dots on the termen. The hindwings are dark grey.
