= Commatica placoterma =

Scientific classification
- Kingdom: Animalia
- Phylum: Arthropoda
- Class: Insecta
- Order: Lepidoptera
- Family: Gelechiidae
- Genus: Commatica
- Species: C. placoterma

Binomial name
- Commatica placoterma Meyrick, 1918

Species of moth

Commatica placoterma is a moth in the family Gelechiidae. It was described by Edward Meyrick in 1918. It is found in Colombia.

The wingspan is 10–11 mm. The forewings are dark grey, more or less suffusedly irrorated (sprinkled) with whitish, becoming blackish posteriorly, especially along the posterior half of the costa. The stigmata are cloudy and blackish, with the plical obliquely before the first discal. There is a short fine oblique white striga from the costa at three-fourths and an oval whitish blotch lying along the termen, more or less suffusedly mixed fuscous on the lower portion, with two fine blackish dashes and the terminal edge black. The hindwings are dark fuscous.
