= Eustalodes achrasella =

Scientific classification
- Domain: Eukaryota
- Kingdom: Animalia
- Phylum: Arthropoda
- Class: Insecta
- Order: Lepidoptera
- Family: Gelechiidae
- Genus: Eustalodes
- Species: E. achrasella

Binomial name
- Eustalodes achrasella (Bradley, 1981)

Synonyms
- Anarsia achrasella Bradley, 1981

Species of moth

Eustalodes achrasella, the sapota bud borer, is a moth in the family Gelechiidae. It was described by John David Bradley in 1981. It is found in Pakistan and northern India.

The length of the forewings is 9.8-12.4 mm for males and 10.4-12.8 mm for females.

The larvae feed on Achras sapota.
