= Commatica chionura =

Scientific classification
- Kingdom: Animalia
- Phylum: Arthropoda
- Class: Insecta
- Order: Lepidoptera
- Family: Gelechiidae
- Genus: Commatica
- Species: C. chionura

Binomial name
- Commatica chionura Meyrick, 1914

Species of moth

Commatica chionura is a moth in the family Gelechiidae. It was described by Edward Meyrick in 1914. It is found in Guyana and Peru.

The wingspan is 9–10 mm. The forewings are dark violet grey becoming blackish posteriorly. The stigmata are cloudy, blackish, sometimes more or less absorbed in the blackish suffusion, with the plical obliquely before the first discal. There is a very oblique white strigula from the costa at two-thirds, where a faint interrupted whitish line runs to near the termen beneath the apex, then curved very near the termen to the tornus. A brown mark is found along the costa beyond this, terminated by a white pre-apical dot. The hindwings are dark fuscous.
