= Pessograptis cancellata =

Scientific classification
- Domain: Eukaryota
- Kingdom: Animalia
- Phylum: Arthropoda
- Class: Insecta
- Order: Lepidoptera
- Family: Gelechiidae
- Genus: Pessograptis
- Species: P. cancellata

Binomial name
- Pessograptis cancellata (Meyrick, 1914)

Synonyms
- Chelaria cancellata Meyrick, 1914

Species of moth

Pessograptis cancellata is a moth in the family Gelechiidae. It was described by Edward Meyrick in 1914. It is found in Guyana.

The wingspan is 9–12 mm. The forewings are whitish, sprinkled with dark fuscous and with four semi-oval dark fuscous costal blotches between the base and three-fourths, nearly touching on the margin, the first two with whitish-ochreous tufts adjoining them beneath. There is a whitish-ochreous tuft on the fold beneath the second costal blotch. The dorsum and disc are irregularly blotched with dark grey, with some irregularly grouped blackish scales, namely three dorsal blotches, one in the disc before the middle, one beyond this beneath the middle and two transversely placed in the disc at two-thirds. All these are ill defined and tend to coalesce. The apical fourth of the wing is irregularly suffused with dark grey and sprinkled with blackish. The hindwings are grey, with the veins suffused with dark grey, in males paler and hyaline (glass like) on the basal half.
