= Arla diversella =

Scientific classification
- Domain: Eukaryota
- Kingdom: Animalia
- Phylum: Arthropoda
- Class: Insecta
- Order: Lepidoptera
- Family: Gelechiidae
- Genus: Arla
- Species: A. diversella

Binomial name
- Arla diversella (Busck, 1916)

Synonyms
- Gelechia diversella Busck, 1916

Species of moth

Arla diversella is a moth of the family Gelechiidae. It is found in North America, where it has been recorded from California.

The wingspan is 15–17 mm. The forewings are whitish overlaid with reddish fuscous scales and with a large ill-defined reddish-brown spot on the cell. A similar spot is found at the end of the cell, above and below which is a black costal and dorsal spot. There is also a small black streak on the fold and a series of ill-defined black spots around the apical and terminal margin. The hindwings are light fuscous.
