= Commatica lupata =

Scientific classification
- Domain: Eukaryota
- Kingdom: Animalia
- Phylum: Arthropoda
- Class: Insecta
- Order: Lepidoptera
- Family: Gelechiidae
- Genus: Commatica
- Species: C. lupata

Binomial name
- Commatica lupata Meyrick, 1914

Species of moth

Commatica lupata is a moth in the family Gelechiidae. It was described by Edward Meyrick in 1914. It is found in Guyana and Peru.

The wingspan is 8–10 mm. The forewings are pale ochreous, brownish tinged posteriorly, suffused with ochreous whitish towards the costa anteriorly. The costal edge is black towards the base and there is a dark fuscous dot or oblique mark beneath the fold before one-fourth. The plical and first discal stigmata are blackish, the plical very obliquely before the first discal, both sometimes merged in a very oblique dark fuscous mark. A thick black streak is found along the costa from before the middle to the apex, attenuated anteriorly, cut by a very oblique fine white strigula from three-fourths. There is sometimes some fuscous suffusion along the fold posteriorly and a fine black dash is found in the disc about four-fifths, sometimes anteriorly extended and rather curved downwards. There is a stronger black dash above the tornus, sometimes connected with the tornus by fuscous suffusion and there is also a dentate whitish line just before the termen, the terminal interstices speckled with blackish. The hindwings are dark fuscous.
