= Parastega chionostigma =

Scientific classification
- Domain: Eukaryota
- Kingdom: Animalia
- Phylum: Arthropoda
- Class: Insecta
- Order: Lepidoptera
- Family: Gelechiidae
- Genus: Parastega
- Species: P. chionostigma

Binomial name
- Parastega chionostigma (Walsingham, 1911)

Synonyms
- Telphusa chionostigma Walsingham, 1911; Parastega ochropis Meyrick, 1914

Species of moth

Parastega chionostigma is a moth in the family Gelechiidae. It was described by Thomas de Grey, 6th Baron Walsingham, in 1911. It is found in Panama, Ecuador and Suriname.

The wingspan is about 19 mm. The forewings are deep purplish black, with two distinct, clearly defined, white spots. One ovate, placed obliquely, touching the costa at one-fourth from the base, its outer extremity resting on the fold, beyond which are a few ochreous scales in the fold. The other is semi-lunate, its base resting on the costa before the apex. There is a minute white dot at the extreme apex. The hindwings are smoky brownish fuscous.
