= Canthonistis amphicarpa =

Scientific classification
- Kingdom: Animalia
- Phylum: Arthropoda
- Class: Insecta
- Order: Lepidoptera
- Family: Gelechiidae
- Genus: Canthonistis
- Species: C. amphicarpa

Binomial name
- Canthonistis amphicarpa Meyrick, 1922

Species of moth

Canthonistis amphicarpa is a moth in the family Gelechiidae. It was described by Edward Meyrick in 1922. It is found on Java in Indonesia.

The wingspan is 13–14 mm. The forewings are ochreous yellow with two large purple-grey dorsal blotches confluent dorsally and extending from near the base to the tornus and reaching three-fourths across the wing. The hindwings are light yellowish, the dorsal half suffused light grey.
