= Leucogoniella distincta =

Scientific classification
- Domain: Eukaryota
- Kingdom: Animalia
- Phylum: Arthropoda
- Class: Insecta
- Order: Lepidoptera
- Family: Gelechiidae
- Genus: Leucogoniella
- Species: L. distincta

Binomial name
- Leucogoniella distincta (Keifer, 1935)

Synonyms
- Leucogonia distincta Keifer, 1935

Species of moth

Leucogoniella distincta is a moth of the family Gelechiidae. It was described by Keifer in 1935. It is found in North America, where it has been recorded from California.

The wingspan is 7.5–9 mm. The forewings are rather shining grey, tending to blackish apically, especially beyond the fascia. The plical stigma are faintly darker at one-third. There is a short white outward dash on the costa at halfway, preceded and followed by blackish. There is an antapical white fascia from the costa to the tornus, more or less bent outwardly in the center but not angulate. Some white spots are found around the apical margins, including one on the apex. The hindwings are lighter grey than the forewings.
