= Charistica caeligena =

Scientific classification
- Domain: Eukaryota
- Kingdom: Animalia
- Phylum: Arthropoda
- Class: Insecta
- Order: Lepidoptera
- Family: Gelechiidae
- Genus: Charistica
- Species: C. caeligena

Binomial name
- Charistica caeligena (Meyrick, 1922)

Synonyms
- Zalithia caeligena Meyrick, 1922

Species of moth

Charistica caeligena is a moth in the family Gelechiidae. It was described by Edward Meyrick in 1922. It is found in Amazonas, Brazil.

The wingspan is 12–13 mm. The forewings are fulvous orange with a deep blue basal patch, limited by an oblique blackish streak from one-third of the costa to the middle of the dorsum, a spot of blackish suffusion on the base of the costa and three light silvery-blue longitudinal streaks, the first along the costa from before the middle to four-fifths, the second in the disc from about the middle to near the apex, partially and variably edged with some blackish marking anteriorly and in females also posteriorly, the third beneath the fold from the basal patch to the tornus, edged with blackish suffusion. In females, there is a terminal fascia of deep brown-reddish suffusion. The hindwings are dark fuscous.
