= Commatica falcatella =

Scientific classification
- Kingdom: Animalia
- Phylum: Arthropoda
- Class: Insecta
- Order: Lepidoptera
- Family: Gelechiidae
- Genus: Commatica
- Species: C. falcatella

Binomial name
- Commatica falcatella (Walker, 1864)

Synonyms
- Gelechia falcatella Walker, 1864; Gelechia rostella Felder & Rogenhofer, 1875

Species of moth

Commatica falcatella is a moth in the family Gelechiidae. It was described by Francis Walker in 1864. It is found in Mexico, Colombia and the Brazilian states of Amazonas and Rio de Janeiro.

Adults are chalybeous (steel-blue) black, the forewings with two silvery costal points, one at three-fifths of the length, the other at four-fifths. The hindwings are dark cupreous.
