= Beltheca phosphoropa =

Scientific classification
- Kingdom: Animalia
- Phylum: Arthropoda
- Class: Insecta
- Order: Lepidoptera
- Family: Gelechiidae
- Genus: Beltheca
- Species: B. phosphoropa

Binomial name
- Beltheca phosphoropa (Meyrick, 1922)

Synonyms
- Anterethista phosphoropa Meyrick, 1922

Species of moth

Beltheca phosphoropa is a moth of the family Gelechiidae. It was described by Edward Meyrick in 1922. It is found in Peru and Pará, Brazil.

The wingspan is 7–9 mm. The forewings are glossy dark grey, on the posterior half dark fuscous and with an oblique iridescent violet-metallic strigula from the costa at three-fifths and similar bright iridescent violet-metallic scattered scales in the disc posteriorly, as well as a dot on the dorsum before the tornus. The hindwings are dark fuscous, in males with a slender expansible dark grey hair-pencil from the costa near the base, and a large dense pencil of blackish hairscales from the base lying along the dorsum.
