= Tornodoxa dubicanella =

Scientific classification
- Domain: Eukaryota
- Kingdom: Animalia
- Phylum: Arthropoda
- Class: Insecta
- Order: Lepidoptera
- Family: Gelechiidae
- Genus: Tornodoxa
- Species: T. dubicanella

Binomial name
- Tornodoxa dubicanella Ueda, 2012

Species of moth

Tornodoxa dubicanella is a moth in the family Gelechiidae. It was described by Ueda in 2012. It is found in Japan (Hokkaido, Kyushu).

The length of the forewings is 5-6.5 mm for males and 5-5.5 mm for females.
