= Aponoea pruinosella =

Scientific classification
- Kingdom: Animalia
- Phylum: Arthropoda
- Clade: Pancrustacea
- Class: Insecta
- Order: Lepidoptera
- Family: Gelechiidae
- Genus: Aponoea
- Species: A. pruinosella

Binomial name
- Aponoea pruinosella Chrétien, 1915

Species of moth

Aponoea pruinosella is a moth in the family Gelechiidae. It was described by Pierre Chrétien in 1915. It is found in Algeria.

The wingspan is 11-12.5 mm.
