= Palintropa peregrina =

Scientific classification
- Domain: Eukaryota
- Kingdom: Animalia
- Phylum: Arthropoda
- Class: Insecta
- Order: Lepidoptera
- Family: Gelechiidae
- Genus: Palintropa
- Species: P. peregrina

Binomial name
- Palintropa peregrina Clarke, 1971

Species of moth

Palintropa peregrina is a moth in the family Gelechiidae. It was described by Clarke in 1971. It is found on Rapa Iti.
