= Haplochela =

Scientific classification
- Kingdom: Animalia
- Phylum: Arthropoda
- Class: Insecta
- Order: Lepidoptera
- Family: Gelechiidae
- Tribe: Chelariini
- Genus: Haplochela; Meyrick, 1923

Genus of moths

Haplochela is a genus of moth in the family Gelechiidae.

== Species ==
- Haplochela trigonota Walsingham, 1911

== Former species ==
- Haplochela mundana Meyrick, 1914
