= Haplochela trigonota =

Scientific classification
- Kingdom: Animalia
- Phylum: Arthropoda
- Class: Insecta
- Order: Lepidoptera
- Family: Gelechiidae
- Genus: Haplochela
- Species: H. trigonota

Binomial name
- Haplochela trigonota (Walsingham, 1911)

Synonyms
- Psoricoptera trigonota Walsingham, 1911; Chelaria mundana Meyrick, 1914

Species of moth

Haplochela trigonota is a moth in the family Gelechiidae. It was described by Thomas de Grey in 1911. It is found in Mexico, Panama, Guyana and Brazil.

The wingspan is 16–21 mm. The fore-wings are shining, fawn-ochreous, mottled with darker and paler shades of umber-brown, with some fuscous scaling at the base. There is a conspicuous flap of scales at the start of the cell and a large triangular patch on the middle of the costa, consisting of two shades of umber-brown, with some dark fuscous, preceded and followed by small costal spots of the same colour. Below it, towards the dorsum near to the base, are a few raised scales of umber-brown. The outer third of the wing, except towards the costa, is much shaded with umber-brown, mottled, especially along the termen, with dark fuscous. The hind-wings are grayish brown.
