= Commatica metochra =

Scientific classification
- Kingdom: Animalia
- Phylum: Arthropoda
- Class: Insecta
- Order: Lepidoptera
- Family: Gelechiidae
- Genus: Commatica
- Species: C. metochra

Binomial name
- Commatica metochra Meyrick, 1914

Species of moth

Commatica metochra is a moth in the family Gelechiidae. It was described by Edward Meyrick in 1914. It is found in Guyana and Peru.

The wingspan is 9–10 mm. The forewings are brownish ochreous sprinkled with dark fuscous and with a dark fuscous streak along the costa from the base to the subterminal line. The stigmata are dark fuscous, the plical obliquely before the first discal, the second discal usually obsolete. There is a straight direct ochreous-white subterminal line from three-fourths of the costa to the dorsum before the tornus, edged anteriorly with dark fuscous suffusion. The apical area beyond this is yellow ochreous, mixed with whitish between the veins, and towards the margin with some black specks sometimes forming short dashes. There are also three or four black marginal dots around the apex and termen. The hindwings are dark grey.
