= Commatica cryptina =

Scientific classification
- Domain: Eukaryota
- Kingdom: Animalia
- Phylum: Arthropoda
- Class: Insecta
- Order: Lepidoptera
- Family: Gelechiidae
- Genus: Commatica
- Species: C. cryptina

Binomial name
- Commatica cryptina (Walsingham, 1911)

Synonyms
- Untomia cryptina Walsingham, 1911

Species of moth

Commatica cryptina is a moth in the family Gelechiidae. It was described by Thomas de Grey, 6th Baron Walsingham, in 1911. It is found in Mexico (Tabasco).

The wingspan is 8–9 mm. The forewings are dark tawny brownish fuscous, slightly bestrewn with steely grey scales and with a slender pale steel-grey streak running obliquely outward from the commencement of the costal cilia to a little below the apex, where it is angulated and continued indistinctly to the tornus. The hindwings are dark bronzy brownish.
