= Commatica eremna =

Scientific classification
- Kingdom: Animalia
- Phylum: Arthropoda
- Class: Insecta
- Order: Lepidoptera
- Family: Gelechiidae
- Genus: Commatica
- Species: C. eremna

Binomial name
- Commatica eremna Meyrick, 1909

Species of moth

Commatica eremna is a moth in the family Gelechiidae. It was described by Edward Meyrick in 1909. It is found in Bolivia.

The wingspan is about 10 mm. The forewings are very dark fuscous with an almost marginal series of white specks around the posterior sixth of the costa and the termen. The hindwings are dark fuscous, lighter towards the base.
