= Commatica bifuscella =

Scientific classification
- Kingdom: Animalia
- Phylum: Arthropoda
- Clade: Pancrustacea
- Class: Insecta
- Order: Lepidoptera
- Family: Gelechiidae
- Genus: Commatica
- Species: C. bifuscella

Binomial name
- Commatica bifuscella (Forbes, 1931)

Synonyms
- Anacampsis bifuscella Forbes, 1931

Species of moth

Commatica bifuscella is a moth in the family Gelechiidae. It was described by William Trowbridge Merrifield Forbes in 1931. It is found in Puerto Rico.
