= Palintropa hippica =

Scientific classification
- Domain: Eukaryota
- Kingdom: Animalia
- Phylum: Arthropoda
- Class: Insecta
- Order: Lepidoptera
- Family: Gelechiidae
- Genus: Palintropa
- Species: P. hippica

Binomial name
- Palintropa hippica Meyrick, 1913

Species of moth

Palintropa hippica is a moth in the family Gelechiidae. It was described by Edward Meyrick in 1913. It is found in Sri Lanka.

The wingspan is 13–14 mm. The forewings are fuscous irrorated (sprinkled) with whitish and with a dark brown patch irregularly irrorated with blackish extending along the costa from one-third to near the apex, and reaching more than halfway across the wing, limited beneath before the middle by a large tuft of scales on the fold. A silvery-grey-whitish line crosses the wing at five-sixths, on the lower half dilated into a spot preceded and followed by light brownish-ochreous spaces and margined anteriorly by a dark fuscous tuft of scales. There is a silvery-whitish angulated transverse line immediately before the apex. The hindwings are dark grey, thinly scaled and semi-transparent in the disc anteriorly.
