= Tornodoxa longiella =

Scientific classification
- Kingdom: Animalia
- Phylum: Arthropoda
- Clade: Pancrustacea
- Class: Insecta
- Order: Lepidoptera
- Family: Gelechiidae
- Genus: Tornodoxa
- Species: T. longiella

Binomial name
- Tornodoxa longiella Park, 1993

Species of moth

Tornodoxa longiella is a moth in the family Gelechiidae. It was described by Kyu-Tek Park in 1993. It is found in Korea and Japan.

The wingspan is 17–18 mm.
