= Holophysis =

Scientific classification
- Domain: Eukaryota
- Kingdom: Animalia
- Phylum: Arthropoda
- Class: Insecta
- Order: Lepidoptera
- Family: Gelechiidae
- Tribe: Anacampsini
- Genus: Holophysis; Walsingham, 1910

Genus of moths

Holophysis is a genus of moths in the family Gelechiidae.

== Species ==
- Holophysis anoma Walsingham, 1910
- Holophysis autodesma (Meyrick, 1918)
- Holophysis auxiliaris (Meyrick, 1918)
- Holophysis barydesma (Meyrick, 1918)
- Holophysis emblemella (Clemens, 1860)
- Holophysis quadrimaculata Walsingham, 1910
- Holophysis stagmatophoria Walsingham, 1910
- Holophysis tentatella (Walker, 1864)
- Holophysis xanthostoma Walsingham, 1910
