= Pseudochelaria scabrella =

Scientific classification
- Domain: Eukaryota
- Kingdom: Animalia
- Phylum: Arthropoda
- Class: Insecta
- Order: Lepidoptera
- Family: Gelechiidae
- Genus: Pseudochelaria
- Species: P. scabrella

Binomial name
- Pseudochelaria scabrella (Busck, 1913)

Synonyms
- Gelechia scabrella Busck, 1913

Species of moth

Pseudochelaria scabrella is a moth of the family Gelechiidae. It was described by August Busck in 1913. It is found in North America, where it has been recorded from California, Nevada and Washington.

The wingspan is 17–20 mm. The forewings are irrorated brown with a large triangular dorsal patch near the base reaching with one corner to the costal edge and sharply edged posteriorly by a thin oblique white line. There is a similarly unicolored on the middle of the wing, but a more diffused larger patch, edged posteriorly by a thin, transverse, slightly concave, white line across the wing at the apical third. Both of these dark brown areas contain small tufts of raised scales in two longitudinal rows. The hindwings are light shiny fuscous.
