= Tornodoxa =

Scientific classification
- Domain: Eukaryota
- Kingdom: Animalia
- Phylum: Arthropoda
- Class: Insecta
- Order: Lepidoptera
- Family: Gelechiidae
- Tribe: Chelariini
- Genus: Tornodoxa; Meyrick, 1921

Genus of moths

Tornodoxa is a genus of moth in the family Gelechiidae.

== Species ==
- Tornodoxa dubicanella Ueda, 2012
- Tornodoxa leptopalta (Meyrick, 1934)
- Tornodoxa longiella Park, 1993
- Tornodoxa paraleptopalta Ueda, 2012
- Tornodoxa tholochorda Meyrick, 1921
