= Pseudosophronia constanti =

Scientific classification
- Domain: Eukaryota
- Kingdom: Animalia
- Phylum: Arthropoda
- Class: Insecta
- Order: Lepidoptera
- Family: Gelechiidae
- Genus: Pseudosophronia
- Species: P. constanti

Binomial name
- Pseudosophronia constanti (Nel, 1998)

Synonyms
- Sophronia constanti Nel, 1998

Species of moth

Pseudosophronia constanti is a moth of the family Gelechiidae. It was described by Jacques Nel in 1998. It is found in France.
