= Pseudosophronia exustellus =

Scientific classification
- Kingdom: Animalia
- Phylum: Arthropoda
- Clade: Pancrustacea
- Class: Insecta
- Order: Lepidoptera
- Family: Gelechiidae
- Genus: Pseudosophronia
- Species: P. exustellus

Binomial name
- Pseudosophronia exustellus (Zeller, 1847)

Synonyms
- Ypsolophus exustellus Zeller, 1847; Sophronia buvati Nel, 1998

Species of moth

Pseudosophronia exustellus is a moth of the family Gelechiidae. It was described by Philipp Christoph Zeller in 1847. It is found in Portugal, Spain, France, Italy, and on Sicily.
