= Holophysis stagmatophoria =

Scientific classification
- Domain: Eukaryota
- Kingdom: Animalia
- Phylum: Arthropoda
- Class: Insecta
- Order: Lepidoptera
- Family: Gelechiidae
- Genus: Holophysis
- Species: H. stagmatophoria

Binomial name
- Holophysis stagmatophoria Walsingham, 1910

Species of moth

Holophysis stagmatophoria is a moth of the family Gelechiidae. It was described by Thomas de Grey, 6th Baron Walsingham, in 1910. It is found in Mexico (Guerrero).

The wingspan is about 10 mm. The forewings are shining, bronzy brown, with brilliant silvery streaks becoming white towards the costa. The first of these is at one-fourth, running obliquely outwards from the costa to a little beyond the fold, this is almost entirely silvery white. The second is a little beyond the middle, forming an irregular outwardly curved fascia reduplicated on the cell, white on the costa with a slight aeneous tinge beneath it. The third forms a slightly oblique spot at the commencement of the costal cilia, a fourth appearing as an elongate, slightly aeneous, silvery patch along the termen. The hindwings are bronzy brown, slightly paler than the forewings.
