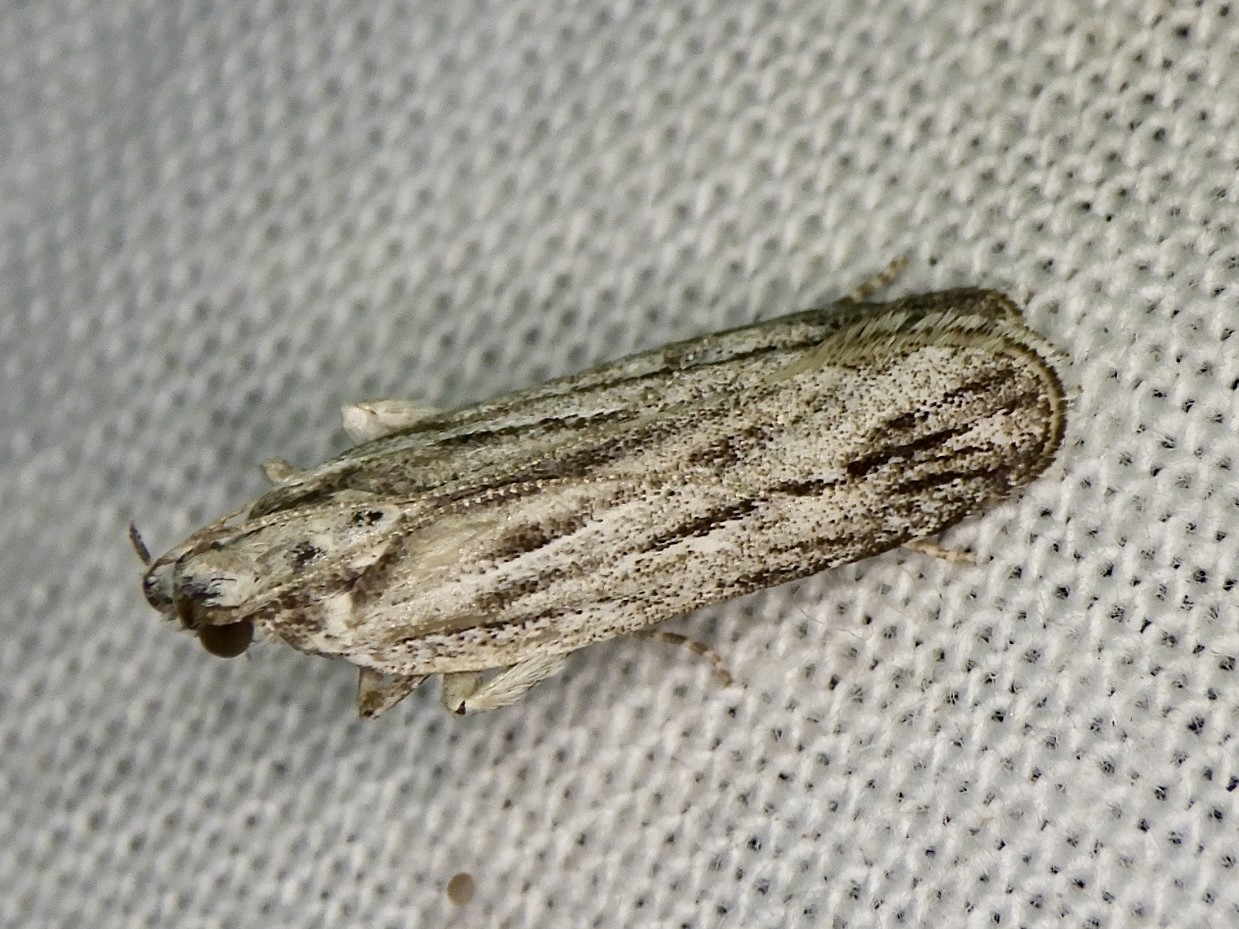

Scientific classification
- Kingdom: Animalia
- Phylum: Arthropoda
- Class: Insecta
- Order: Lepidoptera
- Family: Gelechiidae
- Genus: Tornodoxa
- Species: T. tholochorda

Binomial name
- Tornodoxa tholochorda Meyrick, 1921

= Tornodoxa tholochorda =

Species of moth

Tornodoxa tholochorda is a species of moth in the family Gelechiidae. It was described by Edward Meyrick in 1921. It is found in Korea, Japan and Zhejiang, China.

== Description ==
The wingspan is about 22 mm. The forewings are whitish, irregularly sprinkled with grey and dark fuscous with a blackish line above the middle from the base to one-fifth and some dark grey suffusion along the basal half of the dorsum. There is a vague line of dark fuscous sprinkles rising out of this near the base and continued just beneath the fold nearly to the extremity, suffusedly edged with white above. There is also an irregular dark fuscous median line from the base almost to the apex, more blackish on the posterior half, edged with white above, indented by a white mark on the lower edge at three-fourths and obscurely interrupted before the apex. Three or four blackish interneural dashes are found towards the costa posteriorly and there is a streak of dark fuscous suffusion along the costa from before the middle to the apex, cut by four oblique white strigulae. The hindwings are grey.
