= Eustalodes anthivora =

Scientific classification
- Kingdom: Animalia
- Phylum: Arthropoda
- Class: Insecta
- Order: Lepidoptera
- Family: Gelechiidae
- Genus: Eustalodes
- Species: E. anthivora

Binomial name
- Eustalodes anthivora Clarke, 1954

Species of moth

Eustalodes anthivora is a moth in the family Gelechiidae. It was described by Clarke in 1954. It is found in the Philippines.

The larvae feed on Achras sapota. They feed on the flowers, causing them to drop.
