= Canthonistis xestocephala =

Scientific classification
- Domain: Eukaryota
- Kingdom: Animalia
- Phylum: Arthropoda
- Class: Insecta
- Order: Lepidoptera
- Family: Gelechiidae
- Genus: Canthonistis
- Species: C. xestocephala

Binomial name
- Canthonistis xestocephala Diakonoff, [1968]

Species of moth

Canthonistis xestocephala is a moth in the family Gelechiidae. It was described by Alexey Diakonoff in 1968. It is found on Luzon in the Philippines.

The wingspan is 15–17 mm. The forewings are bright yellow and with two large purplish-fuscous patches, rounded and almost entirely confluent except above, extending along the dorsum beyond the base to the tornus and filling out the whole wing. The anterior blotch almost reaches the costa, while the posterior does not reach it. The hindwings are glossy light yellowish fuscous, with the apex pale yellow.
