= Crasimorpha peragrata =

Scientific classification
- Domain: Eukaryota
- Kingdom: Animalia
- Phylum: Arthropoda
- Class: Insecta
- Order: Lepidoptera
- Family: Gelechiidae
- Genus: Crasimorpha
- Species: C. peragrata

Binomial name
- Crasimorpha peragrata Meyrick, 1923

Species of moth

Crasimorpha peragrata is a moth in the family Gelechiidae. It was described by Edward Meyrick in 1923. It is found in French Guiana.

The wingspan is about 23 mm. The forewings are light fuscous, mostly irregularly overlaid with white suffusion, especially towards the costal and dorsal areas there are a few scattered blackish scales. There is a slender irregular blackish streak along the fold mostly edged with white beneath, and a similar longitudinal streak from the middle of the disc to the termen, a similar streak above the posterior portion of this, as well as a blackish longitudinal streak between these two towards the termen, and a subdorsal one on the posterior half. An elongate dark fuscous mark is found on the middle of the costa. The hindwings are grey.
