= Commatica parmulata =

Scientific classification
- Kingdom: Animalia
- Phylum: Arthropoda
- Class: Insecta
- Order: Lepidoptera
- Family: Gelechiidae
- Genus: Commatica
- Species: C. parmulata

Binomial name
- Commatica parmulata Meyrick, 1914

Species of moth

Commatica parmulata is a moth in the family Gelechiidae. It was described by Edward Meyrick in 1914. It is found in Guyana and Brazil.

The wingspan is about 11 mm. The forewings are dark violet fuscous, suffused in the disc with light glossy blue and features an oblique blackish mark beneath the fold at one-fourth. The stigmata are large, elongate and blackish, with the plical located obliquely before the first discal. There are some white irroration (sprinkles) above and below the second discal and a very oblique white strigula from the costa before two-thirds, where a strongly curved fine whitish line runs to the tornus. A leaden-grey terminal patch extends to the second discal stigma and is cut by this line, marked before the apex by a white spot cut by two black dashes and surrounded by some white irroration. The hindwings are dark fuscous.
