= Anthistarcha geniatella =

Scientific classification
- Domain: Eukaryota
- Kingdom: Animalia
- Phylum: Arthropoda
- Class: Insecta
- Order: Lepidoptera
- Family: Gelechiidae
- Genus: Anthistarcha
- Species: A. geniatella

Binomial name
- Anthistarcha geniatella (Busck, 1914)

Synonyms
- Gelechia geniatella Busck, 1914

Species of moth

Anthistarcha geniatella is a moth in the family Gelechiidae. It was described by August Busck in 1914. It is found in Panama.

The wingspan is 11–12 mm. The forewings are white overlaid with dark grey and ochreous scales. There are two large tufts of dark erect scales on the middle of the cell, one above the other and together reaching nearly across the wing. The bases of these tufts are yellow. There are four dark brown spots on the costa, edged below with yellow and there is a ring of dark brown scales at the tornus, with a few yellow scales within. The apical part of the wing is heavily overlaid with dark brown which obscures a row of dark terminal dots. The hindwings are semitransparent on the basal half and dark fuscous on the apical half. Males have a strong costal tuft, which is ochreous at the base and blackish brown at the tips.
