= Holophysis barydesma =

Scientific classification
- Kingdom: Animalia
- Phylum: Arthropoda
- Class: Insecta
- Order: Lepidoptera
- Family: Gelechiidae
- Genus: Holophysis
- Species: H. barydesma

Binomial name
- Holophysis barydesma (Meyrick, 1918)

Synonyms
- Zalithia barydesma Meyrick, 1918

Species of moth

Holophysis barydesma is a moth of the family Gelechiidae. It was described by Edward Meyrick in 1918. It is found in Ecuador.

The wingspan is 9–10 mm. The forewings are bronzy blackish with leaden-metallic markings, tinged pale bluish or violet. There is a patch occupying the basal fourth of the wing, the edge obtusely angulated in the middle, including an elongate blackish spot in the disc. There is an irregular fascia from a white dot on the middle of the costa to beyond the middle of the dorsum, nearly interrupted by an irregular oblique blackish striga in the disc. An oblique mark is found from the costa at three-fourths, white on the costa. There is also an irregular transverse blotch from the termen above the tornus, reaching more than halfway across the wing. The hindwings are dark fuscous, in males with a longitudinal median groove containing a long whitish expansible hair-pencil from the base.
