= Pseudochelaria walsinghami =

Scientific classification
- Kingdom: Animalia
- Phylum: Arthropoda
- Class: Insecta
- Order: Lepidoptera
- Family: Gelechiidae
- Genus: Pseudochelaria
- Species: P. walsinghami

Binomial name
- Pseudochelaria walsinghami Dietz, 1900

Synonyms
- Gelechia walsinghami Busack, 1903

Species of moth

Pseudochelaria walsinghami is a moth of the family Gelechiidae. It was described by Dietz in 1900. It is found in North America, where it has been recorded from Alabama, Arizona, Arkansas, Florida, Illinois, Indiana, Kansas, Kentucky, Maine, Mississippi, Nebraska, North Carolina, Ohio, Pennsylvania, South Carolina and Tennessee.

The wingspan is about 17 mm. The forewings are marked with dark, rich brown. The basal space is limited externally by a sharply defined oblique line, twice as far removed from the base at the dorsal than at the costal margin, but not including the latter and a narrow space of the adjacent surface. There is a longitudinal stripe, beginning at two-fifths and extending through the middle of wing to the apex, rather sharply defined along its dorsal margin, but becoming more or less diffused with the dark shading in the costal half. A whitish fascia is found at the beginning of the apical cilia, interrupted by the longitudinal stripe and passing gradually into the dark shading of the apical part of the wing. The costal part of the fascia is concave toward the apex, the dorsal part straight, and passes obliquely backward to the dorsal margin. The apical part has dark lines radiating into the cilia and the median space is washed with brownish, having a slight golden reflection, becoming darker in the costal portion, and more so toward the apical fascia. In the dorsal half, there are two brown spots at two-fifths and three-fifths of the wing respectively, the former surrounded by raised white scales. The hindwings are pale fuscous, paler towards the base.

The larvae feed on Rhus typhina, living under a white web on the underside of the leaflets, and also along the petioles. They are pale green, with isolated hairs.
