= Pessograptis thalamias =

Scientific classification
- Domain: Eukaryota
- Kingdom: Animalia
- Phylum: Arthropoda
- Class: Insecta
- Order: Lepidoptera
- Family: Gelechiidae
- Genus: Pessograptis
- Species: P. thalamias

Binomial name
- Pessograptis thalamias Meyrick, 1923

Species of moth

Pessograptis thalamias is a moth in the family Gelechiidae. It was described by Edward Meyrick in 1923. It is found in Amazonas, Brazil.

The wingspan is 10–11 mm. The forewings are grey speckled with whitish, with some scattered black scales posteriorly. There are four semi-oval darker spots on the anterior two-thirds of the costa separated by white marks, the first three edged beneath with blackish irroration (sprinkles) and then by small pale ochreous marks, the second of these terminated by a dark grey tuft, beneath this a similar tuft on the fold preceded by pale ochreous. There are irregular transverse blotches in the disc before the middle and at two-thirds, partly edged with white, marked with dashes of black irroration in the middle and on the lower edge, and with pale ochreous dots beneath the middle. Two short black dashes are found towards the costa beyond the middle and there are indistinct marginal marks of blackish irroration around the posterior part of the costa and termen. The hindwings are hyaline (glass like), with the veins, apical third and termen suffused with dark grey.
