= Commatica ophitis =

Scientific classification
- Domain: Eukaryota
- Kingdom: Animalia
- Phylum: Arthropoda
- Class: Insecta
- Order: Lepidoptera
- Family: Gelechiidae
- Genus: Commatica
- Species: C. ophitis

Binomial name
- Commatica ophitis (Walsingham, 1911)

Synonyms
- Simoneura ophitis Walsingham, 1911

Species of moth

Commatica ophitis is a moth in the family Gelechiidae. It was described by Thomas de Grey, 6th Baron Walsingham, in 1911. It is found in Mexico (Tabasco), Guyana and Ecuador.

The moth's wingspan is about 10 mm. The forewings are greyish brown, with a conspicuous, yellowish white, serpentine patch at the apex, extending downward to the tornus and through the tornal cilia. Above it is a minute, white, outwardly oblique costal streak, beyond which the dark ground-colour is attenuate outward in a narrow marginal line curving around the apex. Parallel and adjacent to this line one still narrower, whitish ochreous in colour, separates it from a broader brownish ochreous band running through the cilia, following the curve around the apex. The outer portion of the cilia is white, narrowly tipped with grey, thus giving the appearance of five distinguishable lines of different shades of colour enclosing the apex. The hindwings are pale greyish brown, a paler, slender dividing line running along the base of the cilia.
