= Commatica stygia =

Scientific classification
- Kingdom: Animalia
- Phylum: Arthropoda
- Class: Insecta
- Order: Lepidoptera
- Family: Gelechiidae
- Genus: Commatica
- Species: C. stygia

Binomial name
- Commatica stygia Meyrick, 1922

Species of moth

Commatica stygia is a moth in the family Gelechiidae. It was described by Edward Meyrick in 1922. It is found in Amazonas, Brazil.

The wingspan is about 9 mm (0.35 in). The forewings are dark fuscous with a faint interrupted fine whitish line from three-fourths of the costa to the tornus, acutely angulated in the middle and very near the margins throughout. The hindwings are dark grey with a grey expansible hair-pencil lying in the disc from the base to the middle.
