= Crasimorpha infuscata =

Scientific classification
- Kingdom: Animalia
- Phylum: Arthropoda
- Clade: Pancrustacea
- Class: Insecta
- Order: Lepidoptera
- Family: Gelechiidae
- Genus: Crasimorpha
- Species: C. infuscata

Binomial name
- Crasimorpha infuscata Hodges, 1964

Species of moth

Crasimorpha infuscata is a moth of the family Gelechiidae. It was first described by Ronald W. Hodges in 1964. It is native to Brazil, but was purposely introduced to Hawaii in 1960 and 1961 to control Christmasberry. It seems the moth did not become established however.
