= Holophysis quadrimaculata =

Scientific classification
- Domain: Eukaryota
- Kingdom: Animalia
- Phylum: Arthropoda
- Class: Insecta
- Order: Lepidoptera
- Family: Gelechiidae
- Genus: Holophysis
- Species: H. quadrimaculata

Binomial name
- Holophysis quadrimaculata Walsingham, 1910

Species of moth

Holophysis quadrimaculata is a moth of the family Gelechiidae. It was described by Thomas de Grey, 6th Baron Walsingham, in 1910. It is found in Mexico (Tabasco).

The wingspan is about 8 mm. The forewings are dark brownish fuscous, with four steel-grey costal streaks, all inclining a little outwards. The first, near the base, reaching over the fold and the second at one-fourth not reaching the fold. The third, median, reaching to the lower angle of the cell and scarcely separated from a diffused patch of the same colour before and beneath it. The fourth at three-fourths of the wing-length, shorter than the others, a line of steel-grey scales preceding the termen. The hindwings are greyish fuscous.
