= Charistica callichroma =

Scientific classification
- Domain: Eukaryota
- Kingdom: Animalia
- Phylum: Arthropoda
- Class: Insecta
- Order: Lepidoptera
- Family: Gelechiidae
- Genus: Charistica
- Species: C. callichroma

Binomial name
- Charistica callichroma (Meyrick, 1914)

Synonyms
- Zalithia callichroma Meyrick, 1914

Species of moth

Charistica callichroma is a moth in the family Gelechiidae. It was described by Edward Meyrick in 1914. It is found in Guyana and possibly Amazonas, Brazil.

The wingspan is 12–13 mm. The forewings are black with the base narrowly metallic-blue green, extended as a thick streak along the dorsum to the middle. There are slender interrupted yellow transverse streaks between this streak and the costa at one-sixth and before the middle, and the space between them is traversed by a yellow costal line and subcostal and median streaks, alternating with narrow metallic-blue green finely black-edged streaks, the yellow subcostal streak divided by a fine black line. There is a slender violet-leaden transverse median fascia, narrowly edged with black ground colour, considerably expanded posteriorly beneath but not quite reaching the dorsum. The wing beyond this is wholly orange red, except for a yellow wedge-shaped mark on the costa beyond the median fascia, and a bright purple triangular patch extending over the termen with its apex reaching inwards in the disc nearly to the fascia. The hindwings are dark fuscous, in males sometimes tinged with orange towards the subdorsal area, in females with he anterior two-thirds of the wing more or less wholly orange.
