= Compsosaris flavidella =

Scientific classification
- Domain: Eukaryota
- Kingdom: Animalia
- Phylum: Arthropoda
- Class: Insecta
- Order: Lepidoptera
- Family: Gelechiidae
- Genus: Compsosaris
- Species: C. flavidella

Binomial name
- Compsosaris flavidella (Busck, 1914)

Synonyms
- Recurvaria flavidella Busck, 1914

Species of moth

Compsosaris flavidella is a moth in the family Gelechiidae. It was described by August Busck in 1914. It is found in Panama.

The wingspan is about 7 mm. The forewings are light ochreous, suffused on the costal and apical half with darker ochreous. On the middle of the cell is a small black dot and below it on the fold is a tuft of raised scales. At the end of the cell are two, small black dots, one above the other, below which a tuft of raised scales, narrowly edged with black. There is also an inconspicuous, outwardly oblique black streaklet on the middle of the costa and a similar, but much more pronounced black streak at the apical fourth, reaching nearly to the termen and edged posteriorly with light ochreous. Around the apical edge is a series of short black lines. The hindwings are light ochreous fuscous.
