= Holophysis anoma =

Scientific classification
- Kingdom: Animalia
- Phylum: Arthropoda
- Class: Insecta
- Order: Lepidoptera
- Family: Gelechiidae
- Genus: Holophysis
- Species: H. anoma

Binomial name
- Holophysis anoma Walsingham, 1910

Species of moth

Holophysis anoma is a moth of the family Gelechiidae. It was described by Thomas de Grey, 6th Baron Walsingham, in 1910. It is found in Mexico (Vera Cruz, Tabasco).

The wingspan is about 10 mm. The forewings are dull leaden grey at the base, becoming more shining at a little distance from it, this colour is continued along the dorsum blending into a shining silvery grey fascia beyond the middle which is attenuated and recurved upward to the costa, thus enclosing a broad bronzy brown costal patch, its convex lower extremity touching the fold on which it is preceded by a small brown spot. In the silvery fascia is also a small elongate brown spot about the end of the cell. The apical portion of the wing is bronzy brown, with a shining silver-grey costal spot at the commencement of the cilia and a larger shining silver-grey patch arising from the tornus and terminating below and beyond the costal spot. The hindwings are greyish brown.
