= Leucogoniella subsimella =

Scientific classification
- Kingdom: Animalia
- Phylum: Arthropoda
- Clade: Pancrustacea
- Class: Insecta
- Order: Lepidoptera
- Family: Gelechiidae
- Genus: Leucogoniella
- Species: L. subsimella

Binomial name
- Leucogoniella subsimella (Clemens, 1860)

Synonyms
- Parasia subsimella Clemens, 1860

Species of moth

Leucogoniella subsimella is a moth of the family Gelechiidae. It was described by James Brackenridge Clemens in 1860. It is found in North America, where it has been recorded from Pennsylvania and Texas.

The forewings are dark ocherous fuscous, along the costa from its middle, and toward the tip, brown, and in the latter part much sprinkled with whitish. On the middle of the costa is a short, yellowish-white streak, and in the apical third of the wing is an oblique line of the same hue, meeting in the middle of the wing another of the same hue from the inner margin. At and beneath the tip is a blackish-brown spot, and in the cilia a dark-fuscous line. The hindwings are dark ocherous.
