= Commatica emplasta =

Scientific classification
- Kingdom: Animalia
- Phylum: Arthropoda
- Class: Insecta
- Order: Lepidoptera
- Family: Gelechiidae
- Genus: Commatica
- Species: C. emplasta

Binomial name
- Commatica emplasta Meyrick, 1914

Species of moth

Commatica emplasta is a moth in the family Gelechiidae. It was described by Edward Meyrick in 1914. It is found in Guyana and Peru.

The wingspan is 9–10 mm. The forewings are purplish grey irrorated (sprinkled) with dark fuscous, more or less variably mixed or suffused with pale greyish ochreous except towards the costa and dorsum, the costa suffused with dark fuscous. There is a small dark fuscous spot on the fold before one-fourth. The stigmata are represented by similar spots, the plical obliquely before the first discal. There is a fine oblique white strigula from the costa at three-fourths and a black mark along the apical part of the costa, and four black dots or groups of scales along the termen. The hindwings are grey, darker posteriorly, with a fringe of long hairs from the lower margin of the cell.
