= Parastega hemisigna =

Scientific classification
- Domain: Eukaryota
- Kingdom: Animalia
- Phylum: Arthropoda
- Class: Insecta
- Order: Lepidoptera
- Family: Gelechiidae
- Genus: Parastega
- Species: P. hemisigna

Binomial name
- Parastega hemisigna Clarke, 1951

Species of moth

Parastega hemisigna is a moth in the family Gelechiidae. It was described by Clarke in 1951. It is found in Argentina.
