= Tornodoxa paraleptopalta =

Scientific classification
- Domain: Eukaryota
- Kingdom: Animalia
- Phylum: Arthropoda
- Class: Insecta
- Order: Lepidoptera
- Family: Gelechiidae
- Genus: Tornodoxa
- Species: T. paraleptopalta

Binomial name
- Tornodoxa paraleptopalta Ueda, 2012

Species of moth

Tornodoxa paraleptopalta is a moth in the family Gelechiidae. It was described by Ueda in 2012. It is found in Japan (Honshu, Kyushu).
