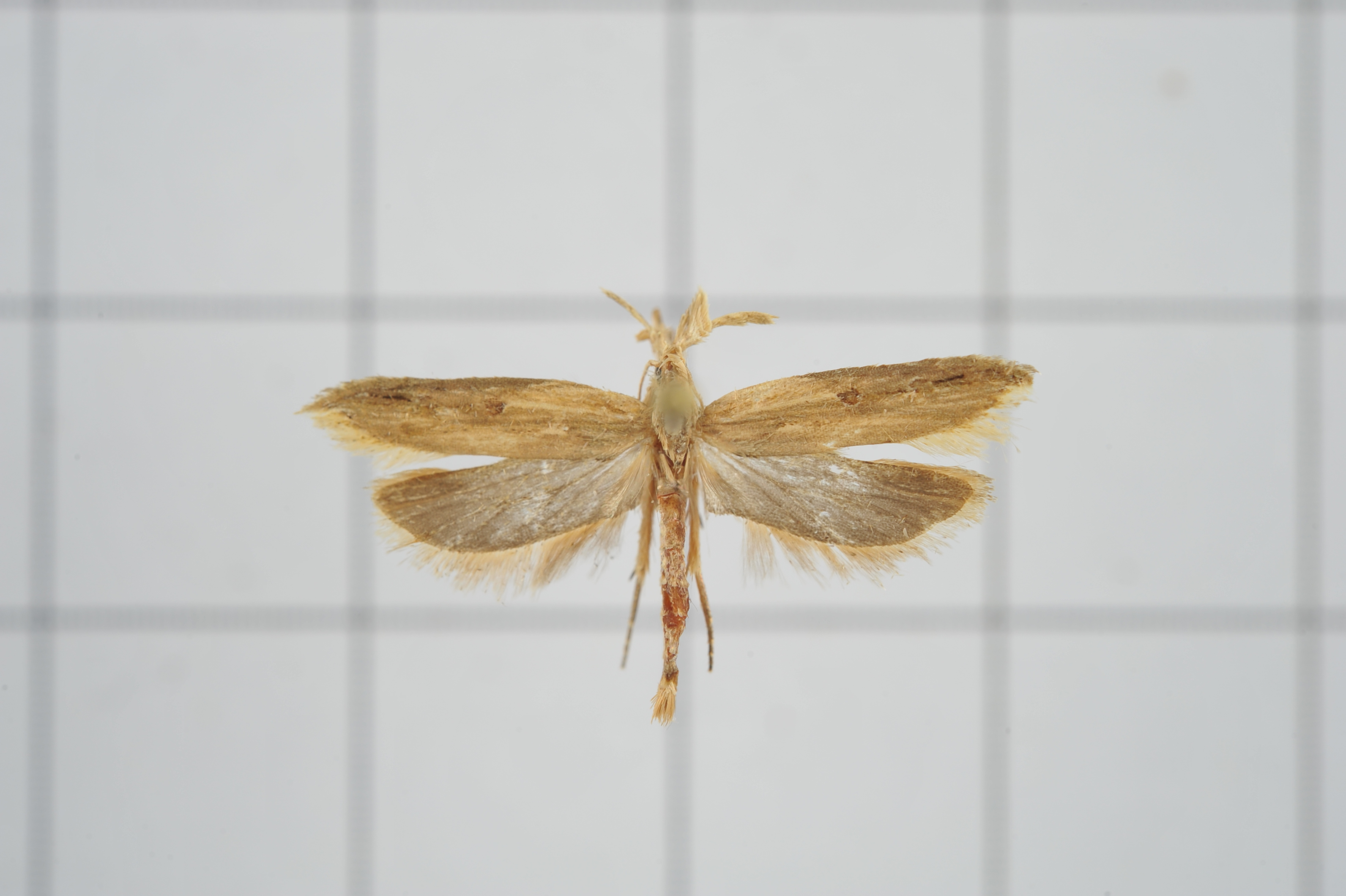

Scientific classification
- Domain: Eukaryota
- Kingdom: Animalia
- Phylum: Arthropoda
- Class: Insecta
- Order: Lepidoptera
- Family: Gelechiidae
- Genus: Paralida
- Species: P. triannulata

Binomial name
- Paralida triannulata Clarke, 1958

= Paralida triannulata =

Species of moth

Paralida triannulata is a moth in the family Gelechiidae. It was described by Clarke in 1958. It is found in Japan and Taiwan.

The wingspan is 22–24 mm.

The larvae feed on Melia azedarach var. japonica.
