= Commatica servula =

Scientific classification
- Kingdom: Animalia
- Phylum: Arthropoda
- Class: Insecta
- Order: Lepidoptera
- Family: Gelechiidae
- Genus: Commatica
- Species: C. servula

Binomial name
- Commatica servula Meyrick, 1922

Species of moth

Commatica servula is a moth in the family Gelechiidae. It was described by Edward Meyrick in 1922. It is found in Peru.

The wingspan is 9–10 mm. The forewings are violet, grey, becoming darker posteriorly with a blackish costal streak from before the middle to the apex, broad towards four-fifths but finely attenuated anteriorly and shortly pointed posteriorly, cut by a very oblique fine white striga from three-fourths. There is a thick whitish streak along the termen from the tornus, not reaching the apex but expanded into an irregular projection. Before it, including two more or less developed spots of ground colour. The hindwings are grey with a large expansible light grey hair-pencil from the base lying in the disc.
