= Pessograptis cyanactis =

Scientific classification
- Domain: Eukaryota
- Kingdom: Animalia
- Phylum: Arthropoda
- Class: Insecta
- Order: Lepidoptera
- Family: Gelechiidae
- Genus: Pessograptis
- Species: P. cyanactis

Binomial name
- Pessograptis cyanactis Meyrick, 1930

Species of moth

Pessograptis cyanactis is a moth in the family Gelechiidae. It was described by Edward Meyrick in 1930. It is found in Pará, Brazil.
