= Charistica exteriorella =

Scientific classification
- Kingdom: Animalia
- Phylum: Arthropoda
- Class: Insecta
- Order: Lepidoptera
- Family: Gelechiidae
- Genus: Charistica
- Species: C. exteriorella

Binomial name
- Charistica exteriorella (Walker, 1864)

Synonyms
- Gelechia exteriorella Walker, 1864

Species of moth

Charistica exteriorella is a moth in the family Gelechiidae. It was described by Francis Walker in 1864. It is found in Amazonas, Brazil.

Adults are metallic green, the forewings with the apical third part bright gilded red, this hue containing a green streak, and communicating with two gilded streaks, which are contained in the green part. The hindwings are cupreous.
