= Aponoea =

Scientific classification (disputed)
- Kingdom: Animalia
- Phylum: Arthropoda
- Class: Insecta
- Order: Lepidoptera
- Family: Gelechiidae
- Tribe: Chelariini
- Genus: Aponoea; Walsingham, 1905

Genus of moth

Aponoea is a genus of moth in the family Gelechiidae. It is recognized by some sources, while other sources consider it a synonym of Holcophora.

== Species ==
There are two recognized species:

- Aponoea obtusipalpis Walsingham, 1905
- Aponoea pruinosella Chrétien, 1915
