= Aponoea obtusipalpis =

Scientific classification
- Domain: Eukaryota
- Kingdom: Animalia
- Phylum: Arthropoda
- Class: Insecta
- Order: Lepidoptera
- Family: Gelechiidae
- Genus: Aponoea
- Species: A. obtusipalpis

Binomial name
- Aponoea obtusipalpis Walsingham, 1905

Synonyms
- Mesophleps cinerellus Turati, 1930

Species of moth

Aponoea obtusipalpis is a moth of the family Gelechiidae. It is found in Spain, Libya and Algeria.

The wingspan is 16–21 mm. The forewings are cinereous, dusted with black scales. The hindwings are rosy grey.

The larvae probably feed on Limoniastrum guyonianum.
