= Anthistarcha binocularis =

Scientific classification
- Kingdom: Animalia
- Phylum: Arthropoda
- Class: Insecta
- Order: Lepidoptera
- Family: Gelechiidae
- Genus: Anthistarcha
- Species: A. binocularis

Binomial name
- Anthistarcha binocularis Meyrick, 1929

Species of moth

Anthistarcha binocularis is a moth in the family Gelechiidae. It was described by Edward Meyrick in 1929. It is found in Brazil (Bahia).

The wingspan is 15–16 mm.

Larvae have been recorded feeding in twigs of Anacardium occidentale.
