= Metatactis =

Scientific classification
- Domain: Eukaryota
- Kingdom: Animalia
- Phylum: Arthropoda
- Class: Insecta
- Order: Lepidoptera
- Family: Gelechiidae
- Tribe: Chelariini
- Genus: Metatactis; Janse, 1949
- Species: M. griseobrunnea

Binomial name
- Metatactis griseobrunnea Janse, 1949

Genus of moths

Metatactis is a genus of moth in the family Gelechiidae. It has a single species, Metatactis griseobrunnea. Both the genus and species were described by Dr. Antonius J. T. Janse in 1949. The species is found in Namibia.
