= Holophysis auxiliaris =

Scientific classification
- Kingdom: Animalia
- Phylum: Arthropoda
- Class: Insecta
- Order: Lepidoptera
- Family: Gelechiidae
- Genus: Holophysis
- Species: H. auxiliaris

Binomial name
- Holophysis auxiliaris (Meyrick, 1918)

Synonyms
- Zalithia auxiliaris Meyrick, 1918

Species of moth

Holophysis auxiliaris is a moth of the family Gelechiidae. It was described by Edward Meyrick in 1918. It is found in Colombia.

The wingspan is 10–11 mm. The forewings are bronzy blackish with metallic leaden-grey markings. There is a basal patch occupying one-fourth of the wing, the edge nearly straight, direct, including an oval blackish spot in the disc. A fascia is found from the middle of the costa to beyond the middle of the dorsum, narrow and white on the costal edge, strongly expanded on the dorsum, including a transverse blackish mark in the disc. There is also a direct transverse costal mark at three-fourths, white on the costa. A transverse blotch is found from the lower part of the termen reaching two-thirds across the wing. The hindwings are dark fuscous.
