= Charistica rhodopetala =

Scientific classification
- Domain: Eukaryota
- Kingdom: Animalia
- Phylum: Arthropoda
- Class: Insecta
- Order: Lepidoptera
- Family: Gelechiidae
- Genus: Charistica
- Species: C. rhodopetala

Binomial name
- Charistica rhodopetala (Meyrick, 1922)

Synonyms
- Zalithia rhodopetala Meyrick, 1922

Species of moth

Charistica rhodopetala is a moth in the family Gelechiidae. It was described by Edward Meyrick in 1922. It is found in Amazonas, Brazil.

The wingspan is 15–16 mm. The forewings are blackish with the basal two-fifths suffused with dark blue except on the costa and with an incomplete narrowly transverse-oval whitish ring before the middle from beneath the costa to below the fold. There is a narrow shining indigo-blue postmedian fascia not quite reaching the margins, expanded posteriorly towards the dorsum, and an oval blotch in the disc at three-fourths not reaching the margins. A triangular whitish spot is found on the costa at four-fifths, followed by a small blackish spot. The apical fifth of the wing beyond these markmgs forms a coppery-red blotch with violet gloss. The hindwings are dark fuscous.
