= Commatica xanthocarpa =

Scientific classification
- Kingdom: Animalia
- Phylum: Arthropoda
- Clade: Pancrustacea
- Class: Insecta
- Order: Lepidoptera
- Family: Gelechiidae
- Genus: Commatica
- Species: C. xanthocarpa

Binomial name
- Commatica xanthocarpa Meyrick, 1922

Species of moth

Commatica xanthocarpa is a moth in the family Gelechiidae. It was described by Edward Meyrick in 1922. It is found in Peru.

The wingspan is 8–9 mm. The forewings are dark purple fuscous irregularly suffused with orange fulvous, leaving especially an undefined dark fasciate streak proceeding from the dorsum before the middle obliquely across the fold, then longitudinally to join a similar dark fascia from the costa preceding a fine whitish oblique striga from the costa at three-fourths reaching three-fourths across the wing, the apical area beyond this orange with two white dots on the costa before the apex. The hindwings are dark fuscous.
