= Scindalmota =

Scientific classification
- Kingdom: Animalia
- Phylum: Arthropoda
- Class: Insecta
- Order: Lepidoptera
- Family: Gelechiidae
- Tribe: Anacampsini
- Genus: Scindalmota; Turner, 1919
- Species: S. limata

Binomial name
- Scindalmota limata Turner, 1919

Genus of moths

Scindalmota is a genus of moth in the family Gelechiidae. It contains the species Scindalmota limata, which is found in Australia, where it has been recorded from Queensland.

The wingspan is about 14 mm. The forewings are whitish mostly suffused with whitish-ochreous and with a large central brownish spot partly outlined by blackish scales, connected with the dorsum before the tornus. There is a brownish dot on the costa just beyond the middle and a brownish fascia partly outlined by blackish scales from two-thirds of the costa to the tornus, constricted towards the tornus. The hindwings are pale grey.
