= Charistica sandaracota =

Scientific classification
- Domain: Eukaryota
- Kingdom: Animalia
- Phylum: Arthropoda
- Class: Insecta
- Order: Lepidoptera
- Family: Gelechiidae
- Genus: Charistica
- Species: C. sandaracota

Binomial name
- Charistica sandaracota (Meyrick, 1914)

Synonyms
- Zalithia sandaracota Meyrick, 1914

Species of moth

Charistica sandaracota is a moth in the family Gelechiidae. It was described by Edward Meyrick in 1914. It is found in Guyana.

The wingspan is about 15 mm. The forewings are black with the base narrowly metallic blue green, extended as a thick streak along the dorsum to the middle and with interrupted yellow transverse streaks between this and the costa at one-sixth and before the middle, connected by costal and three other fine yellow longitudinal lines, with metallic-blue-green streaks between the first and second, and between the third and fourth. There is a narrow transverse violet-leaden median fascia, triangularly dilated posteriorly on the dorsum, edged with black. The wing beyond this is wholly deep red, except a yellow wedge-shaped mark on the costa beyond the median fascia, and an elongate violet-leaden spot in the disc at two-thirds. The hindwings are dark fuscous.
