= Charistica ioploca =

Scientific classification
- Domain: Eukaryota
- Kingdom: Animalia
- Phylum: Arthropoda
- Class: Insecta
- Order: Lepidoptera
- Family: Gelechiidae
- Genus: Charistica
- Species: C. ioploca

Binomial name
- Charistica ioploca (Meyrick, 1922)

Synonyms
- Zalithia ioploca Meyrick, 1922

Species of moth

Charistica ioploca is a moth in the family Gelechiidae. It was described by Edward Meyrick in 1922. It is found in Amazonas, Brazil.

The wingspan is about 15 mm. The forewings are violet grey, on the costal half anteriorly suffused with sky blue and with the extreme costal edge whitish. There are subcostal, median, and plical orange lines from the base to near the middle, and a line from the base of the median to the apex of the subcostal. These are terminated by an angulated dark grey bar in the middle of the disc, edged with orange and pale ochreous suffusion. The posterior area from near beyond this is light ochreous suffused with orange in the disc, towards the dorsum anteriorly forming streaks on the veins and tinged crimson, including a dark ferruginous dot on the end of the cell, two short oblique dark grey marks from the costa before and beyond three-fourths and one just above the apex, a deep ferruginous transverse line at seven-eighths edged anteriorly by white marks below the costa and below the middle, and limiting a deep ferruginous blotch extending along the termen, becoming purplish towards its middle. The hindwings are dark fuscous.
