= Alsodryas lactaria =

Scientific classification
- Domain: Eukaryota
- Kingdom: Animalia
- Phylum: Arthropoda
- Class: Insecta
- Order: Lepidoptera
- Family: Gelechiidae
- Genus: Alsodryas
- Species: A. lactaria

Binomial name
- Alsodryas lactaria Meyrick, 1914

Species of moth

Alsodryas lactaria is a species of moth in the family Gelechiidae. It was described by Edward Meyrick in 1914. It is found in Guyana.

The wingspan is 10–12 mm. The forewings are ochreous-whitish, more or less sprinkled or faintly clouded with pale ochreous and with a black dot on the base of the costa and a small spot at one-fifth, the costal edge black between these. There is also a black subbasal dot near the costa and a slight suffused blackish wedge-shaped mark on the costa before the middle, as well as a larger one beyond the middle. A rather large transverse tuft of blackish-grey scales is found in the disc slightly before the middle, and one somewhat smaller at two-thirds. There are blackish-grey spots on the tornus and middle of the termen, and two or three indistinct blackish dots on the costa towards the apex. The hindwings are grey.
