= Eustalodes =

Scientific classification
- Domain: Eukaryota
- Kingdom: Animalia
- Phylum: Arthropoda
- Class: Insecta
- Order: Lepidoptera
- Family: Gelechiidae
- Tribe: Chelariini
- Genus: Eustalodes; Meyrick, 1927

Genus of moths

Eustalodes is a genus of moth in the family Gelechiidae.

== Species ==
- Eustalodes achrasella Bradley, 1981
- Eustalodes anthivora Clarke, 1954
- Eustalodes oenosema Meyrick, 1927
