= Oestomorpha =

Scientific classification
- Domain: Eukaryota
- Kingdom: Animalia
- Phylum: Arthropoda
- Class: Insecta
- Order: Lepidoptera
- Family: Gelechiidae
- Tribe: Chelariini
- Genus: Oestomorpha; Walsingham, 1911
- Species: O. alloea

Binomial name
- Oestomorpha alloea Walsingham, 1911

Genus of moths

Oestomorpha is a genus of moth in the family Gelechiidae. It contains only one species, Oestomorpha alloea, which is found in Mexico.

The wingspan is about 28 mm. The forewings are dirty white, suffused and sprinkled with greyish fuscous accompanied by broken lines of blackish scales. There is a narrow, greyish fuscous, costal length-streak on the rather less sprinkled costal portion of the wing, commencing at about one-third, interrupted by the white ground-colour near its base, and then continued along the costa to a little beyond the middle, a few blackish scales along its lower edge, while on the cell, below it, are two rather paler fuscous length-spots placed obliquely beyond and corresponding to its separate parts in length and position.

Below these is a broken line of blackish scales which is continued beyond them to the apex and a similar line runs along the fold, and there is a short streak of the same colour on the upper edge of the cell, near the base, and a spot on the fold at one-third, all the intermediate spaces being more or less sprinkled or suffused with pale greyish fuscous. There are about six greyish fuscous shade-spots with a few blackish scales around the apex and termen. The hindwings are greyish brown, the spaces between the veins slightly inclined to be transparent.
