= Commatica cyanorrhoa =

Scientific classification
- Kingdom: Animalia
- Phylum: Arthropoda
- Class: Insecta
- Order: Lepidoptera
- Family: Gelechiidae
- Genus: Commatica
- Species: C. cyanorrhoa

Binomial name
- Commatica cyanorrhoa Meyrick, 1914

Species of moth

Commatica cyanorrhoa is a moth in the family Gelechiidae. It was described by Edward Meyrick in 1914. It is found in Guyana and Brazil.

The wingspan is 14–16 mm. The forewings are dark violet fuscous, the dorsal half suffused with glossy blue. The stigmata are obscure and dark fuscous, with the plical very obliquely before the first discal. There is a fine very oblique white strigula from the costa before two-thirds, continued faintly to near the apex, the costal area beyond this suffused with blackish. There is also a small blackish apical spot. The hindwings are dark fuscous.
