= Chalcomima =

Scientific classification
- Kingdom: Animalia
- Phylum: Arthropoda
- Class: Insecta
- Order: Lepidoptera
- Family: Gelechiidae
- Subfamily: Anacampsinae
- Genus: Chalcomima; Meyrick, 1929
- Species: C. hoplodoxa

Binomial name
- Chalcomima hoplodoxa Meyrick, 1929

Genus of moths

Chalcomima is a genus of moth in the family Gelechiidae. It contains the species Chalcomima hoplodoxa, which is found in Peru.

The wingspan is about 8 mm.
