= Canthonistis =

Scientific classification
- Kingdom: Animalia
- Phylum: Arthropoda
- Clade: Pancrustacea
- Class: Insecta
- Order: Lepidoptera
- Family: Gelechiidae
- Subfamily: Gelechiinae
- Genus: Canthonistis; Meyrick, 1922

Genus of moths

Canthonistis is a genus of moths in the family Gelechiidae.

== Species ==
- Canthonistis amphicarpa Meyrick, 1922
- Canthonistis xestocephala Diakonoff, [1968]
