= Anastomopteryx =

Scientific classification
- Domain: Eukaryota
- Kingdom: Animalia
- Phylum: Arthropoda
- Class: Insecta
- Order: Lepidoptera
- Family: Gelechiidae
- Subfamily: Anacampsinae
- Genus: Anastomopteryx; Janse, 1951
- Species: A. angulata

Binomial name
- Anastomopteryx angulata Janse, 1951

Genus of moths

Anastomopteryx is a genus of moth in the family Gelechiidae. It contains the species Anastomopteryx angulata, which is found in South Africa.
