= Pseudochelaria =

Scientific classification
- Domain: Eukaryota
- Kingdom: Animalia
- Phylum: Arthropoda
- Class: Insecta
- Order: Lepidoptera
- Family: Gelechiidae
- Tribe: Gelechiini
- Genus: Pseudochelaria; Dietz, 1900

Genus of moths

Pseudochelaria is a genus of moth in the family Gelechiidae.

== Species ==
- Pseudochelaria arbutina (Keifer, 1930)
- Pseudochelaria manzanitae (Keifer, 1930)
- Pseudochelaria pennsylvanica Dietz, 1900
- Pseudochelaria scabrella (Busck, 1913)
- Pseudochelaria walsinghami Dietz, 1900
