= Axyrostola =

Scientific classification
- Kingdom: Animalia
- Phylum: Arthropoda
- Class: Insecta
- Order: Lepidoptera
- Family: Gelechiidae
- Tribe: Chelariini
- Genus: Axyrostola; Meyrick, 1923
- Species: A. acherusia

Binomial name
- Axyrostola acherusia Meyrick, 1923

Genus of moths

Axyrostola is a genus of moth in the family Gelechiidae. It contains only one species, Axyrostola acherusia, which is found in Burma.

The wingspan is about 14 mm. The forewings are white sprinkled with fuscous and with a broad irregular bronzy-fuscous median stripe from the base to the costa before the apex, containing a less broad irregular suffused black stripe nearly interrupted in the middle and posteriorly running along its upper edge and sending, at four-fifths from the lower edge, a blackish line nearly to the termen beneath the apex. This stripe appears to form a round spot at three-fourths, half black and half fuscous. There is also a dark fuscous marginal line around the apex and termen. The hindwings are grey, but lighter towards the base.
