= Anthistarcha =

Scientific classification
- Domain: Eukaryota
- Kingdom: Animalia
- Phylum: Arthropoda
- Class: Insecta
- Order: Lepidoptera
- Family: Gelechiidae
- Tribe: Chelariini
- Genus: Anthistarcha; Meyrick, 1925

Genus of moths

Anthistarcha is a genus of moth in the family Gelechiidae.

== Species ==
- Anthistarcha binocularis Meyrick, 1929
- Anthistarcha geniatella Busck, 1914
