= Compsosaris =

Scientific classification
- Domain: Eukaryota
- Kingdom: Animalia
- Phylum: Arthropoda
- Class: Insecta
- Order: Lepidoptera
- Family: Gelechiidae
- Genus: Compsosaris; Meyrick, 1914

Genus of moths

Compsosaris is a genus of moths in the family Gelechiidae.

== Species ==
- Compsosaris flavidella (Busck, 1914)
- Compsosaris testacea Meyrick, 1914
