= Pseudosophronia =

Scientific classification
- Domain: Eukaryota
- Kingdom: Animalia
- Phylum: Arthropoda
- Class: Insecta
- Order: Lepidoptera
- Family: Gelechiidae
- Tribe: Anacampsini
- Genus: Pseudosophronia; Corley, 2001

Genus of moths

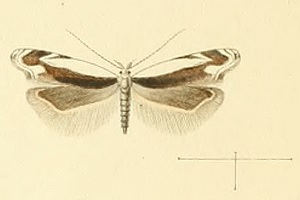
Pseudosophronia cosmella

Pseudosophronia is a genus of moth in the family Gelechiidae.

== Species ==
- Pseudosophronia constanti (Nel, 1998)
- Pseudosophronia cosmella (Constant, 1885)
- Pseudosophronia exustellus (Zeller, 1847)
