= Promolopica =

Scientific classification
- Kingdom: Animalia
- Phylum: Arthropoda
- Class: Insecta
- Order: Lepidoptera
- Family: Gelechiidae
- Subfamily: Anacampsinae
- Genus: Promolopica; Meyrick, 1925
- Species: P. epiphanta

Binomial name
- Promolopica epiphanta Meyrick, 1925

Genus of moths

Promolopica is a genus of moth in the family Gelechiidae. It contains the species Promolopica epiphanta, which is found in Brazil.

The wingspan is about 19 mm. The forewings are white with an ochreous median longitudinal stripe from near the base to an apical spot of fuscous suffusion, marked with two black dots on the costa before the apex and three small spots of ochreous suffusion on the fold, and a spot on the dorsum towards the base. There is some ochreous suffusion on the costa about two-thirds. The hindwings are grey.
