= Crasimorpha =

Scientific classification
- Domain: Eukaryota
- Kingdom: Animalia
- Phylum: Arthropoda
- Class: Insecta
- Order: Lepidoptera
- Family: Gelechiidae
- Tribe: Chelariini
- Genus: Crasimorpha; Meyrick, 1923

Genus of moths

Crasimorpha is a genus of moth in the family Gelechiidae.

== Species ==
- Crasimorpha infuscata Hodges, 1963
- Crasimorpha peragrata Meyrick, 1923
