= Acrophiletis =

Scientific classification
- Kingdom: Animalia
- Phylum: Arthropoda
- Clade: Pancrustacea
- Class: Insecta
- Order: Lepidoptera
- Family: Gelechiidae
- Subfamily: Anacampsinae
- Genus: Acrophiletis; Meyrick, 1932
- Species: A. cosmocrossa

Binomial name
- Acrophiletis cosmocrossa Meyrick, 1932

Genus of moths

Acrophiletis is a genus of moth in the family Gelechiidae. It contains the species Acrophiletis cosmocrossa, which is found in Bolivia.
