= Pilocrates =

Scientific classification
- Domain: Eukaryota
- Kingdom: Animalia
- Phylum: Arthropoda
- Class: Insecta
- Order: Lepidoptera
- Family: Gelechiidae
- Tribe: Chelariini
- Genus: Pilocrates; Meyrick, 1920
- Species: P. prograpta

Binomial name
- Pilocrates prograpta Meyrick, 1920

Genus of moths

Pilocrates is a genus of moth in the family Gelechiidae. It contains only one species, Pilocrates prograpta, which is found in southern India.

The wingspan is about 14 mm. The forewings are glossy ochreous-white with scattered blackish scales and blackish markings. There is a small spot on the base of the costa, a subcostal dot near this, two linear marks along the costa before and beyond one-fourth, an elongate spot on the middle thickened posteriorly, and five dots on the posterior half, small spots on the dorsum at one-fourth and three-fourths, as well as small spots representing the stigmata, with the plical rather obliquely before the first discal, the second discal somewhat below the middle, confluent with a rather small spot above the tornus. There is a larger roundish spot in the disc beyond the second discal and a marginal row of irregular dots around the posterior part of the costa and termen. The hindwings are grey, thinly scaled towards the base, darker towards the termen and with the veins suffused dark fuscous, a hyaline streak beneath the cell towards base.
