= Pauroneura =

Scientific classification
- Domain: Eukaryota
- Kingdom: Animalia
- Phylum: Arthropoda
- Class: Insecta
- Order: Lepidoptera
- Family: Gelechiidae
- Tribe: Anacampsini
- Genus: Pauroneura; Turner, 1919
- Species: P. brachysticha

Binomial name
- Pauroneura brachysticha Turner, 1919

Genus of moths

Pauroneura is a genus of moth in the family Gelechiidae. It contains the species Pauroneura brachysticha, which is found in Australia, where it has been recorded from Queensland.

The wingspan is about 16 mm. The forewings are whitish, unevenly suffused with brownish fuscous and with a moderate dark basal patch, short on the costa, longer on the dorsum. There is a dark costal mark at one-third and a large dorsal blotch confluent with a terminal suffusion. A short outwardly oblique whitish streak is found from two-thirds of the costa, narrowly edged with dark-fuscous, followed by three whitish dots similarly edged. There is a suffused silvery-white transverse mark from the termen beyond the tornus not reaching the costa, cutting across two whitish dark-centred longitudinal streaks from three-fourths to the termen. There is also an elongate whitish apical dot, with a large dark-fuscous spot beneath it. The hindwings are fuscous, with the base of the costa white.
