= Calliphylla =

Scientific classification
- Kingdom: Animalia
- Phylum: Arthropoda
- Class: Insecta
- Order: Lepidoptera
- Family: Gelechiidae
- Subfamily: Anacampsinae
- Genus: Calliphylla; Janse, 1963
- Species: C. retusa

Binomial name
- Calliphylla retusa Janse, 1963

Genus of moths

Calliphylla is a genus of moths in the family Gelechiidae. It contains the species Calliphylla retusa, which is found in South Africa.
