= Amblyphylla =

Scientific classification
- Domain: Eukaryota
- Kingdom: Animalia
- Phylum: Arthropoda
- Class: Insecta
- Order: Lepidoptera
- Family: Gelechiidae
- Tribe: Chelariini
- Genus: Amblyphylla; Janse, 1960
- Species: A. lophozancla

Binomial name
- Amblyphylla lophozancla Janse, 1960

Genus of moths

Amblyphylla is a genus of moth in the family Gelechiidae. It contains only one species, Amblyphylla lophozancla, which is found in Namibia, South Africa and Eswatini.
