= Palintropa =

Scientific classification
- Domain: Eukaryota
- Kingdom: Animalia
- Phylum: Arthropoda
- Class: Insecta
- Order: Lepidoptera
- Family: Gelechiidae
- Subfamily: Gelechiinae
- Genus: Palintropa; Meyrick, 1913

Genus of moths

Palintropa is a genus of moth in the family Gelechiidae.

== Species ==
- Palintropa peregrina Clarke, 1971 (from Rapa island)
- Palintropa hippica Meyrick, 1913 (from Sri Lanka)
