= Capnosema =

Scientific classification
- Kingdom: Animalia
- Phylum: Arthropoda
- Class: Insecta
- Order: Lepidoptera
- Family: Gelechiidae
- Subfamily: Anacampsinae
- Genus: Capnosema; Janse, 1958
- Species: C. celidota

Binomial name
- Capnosema celidota Janse, 1958

Genus of moths

Capnosema is a genus of moths in the family Gelechiidae. It contains the species Capnosema celidota, which is found in South Africa.
