= Platyphalla =

Scientific classification
- Domain: Eukaryota
- Kingdom: Animalia
- Phylum: Arthropoda
- Class: Insecta
- Order: Lepidoptera
- Family: Gelechiidae
- Subfamily: Gelechiinae
- Genus: Platyphalla; Janse, 1951
- Species: P. ochrinotata

Binomial name
- Platyphalla ochrinotata Janse, 1951

Genus of moths

Platyphalla is a genus of moth in the family Gelechiidae. It contains the species Platyphalla ochrinotata, which is found in South Africa.
