= Paraselotis =

Scientific classification
- Kingdom: Animalia
- Phylum: Arthropoda
- Clade: Pancrustacea
- Class: Insecta
- Order: Lepidoptera
- Family: Gelechiidae
- Tribe: Chelariini
- Genus: Paraselotis; Janse, 1960
- Species: P. pelochroa

Binomial name
- Paraselotis pelochroa Janse, 1960

Genus of moths

Paraselotis is a genus of moth in the family Gelechiidae. It contains only one species, Paraselotis pelochroa, which is found in South Africa.
