= Paralida =

Scientific classification
- Domain: Eukaryota
- Kingdom: Animalia
- Phylum: Arthropoda
- Class: Insecta
- Order: Lepidoptera
- Family: Gelechiidae
- Subfamily: Anacampsinae
- Tribe: Chelariini
- Genus: Paralida; Clarke, 1958

Genus of moths

Paralida is a genus of moths in the family Gelechiidae.

== Species ==
- Paralida balanaspis (Meyrick, 1930)
- Paralida triannulata (Clarke, 1958)
