= Chaliniastis =

Scientific classification
- Kingdom: Animalia
- Phylum: Arthropoda
- Class: Insecta
- Order: Lepidoptera
- Family: Gelechiidae
- Subfamily: Anacampsinae
- Genus: Chaliniastis; Meyrick, 1904
- Species: C. astrapaea

Binomial name
- Chaliniastis astrapaea Meyrick, 1904

Genus of moths

Chaliniastis is a genus of moth in the family Gelechiidae. It contains the species Chaliniastis astrapaea, which is found in Australia, where it has been recorded from Queensland and New South Wales.

The wingspan is about 14 mm (0.55 in). The forewings are bronzy-fuscous, darker on the posterior half and with an irregular undefined whitish streak along the dorsum from the base to the tornus, as well as a suffused dark fuscous blotch limiting this above from one-fourth to three-fourths. There is a moderate triangular white costal spot at four-fifths, where a fine white slightly curved line proceeds to the tornus. An obscure whitish-ochreous suffusion is found beyond this on the lower half. The hindwings are pale fuscous, becoming darker posteriorly.
