= Charistica =

Scientific classification
- Domain: Eukaryota
- Kingdom: Animalia
- Phylum: Arthropoda
- Class: Insecta
- Order: Lepidoptera
- Family: Gelechiidae
- Subfamily: Gelechiinae
- Genus: Charistica; Meyrick, 1925

Genus of moths

Charistica is a genus of moths in the family Gelechiidae.

== Species ==
- Charistica caeligena (Meyrick, 1922)
- Charistica callichroma (Meyrick, 1914)
- Charistica exteriorella (Walker, 1864)
- Charistica ioploca (Meyrick, 1922)
- Charistica iriantha (Meyrick, 1914)
- Charistica porphyraspis (Meyrick, 1909)
- Charistica rhodopetala (Meyrick, 1922)
- Charistica sandaracota (Meyrick, 1914)
- Charistica walkeri (Walsingham, 1911)
