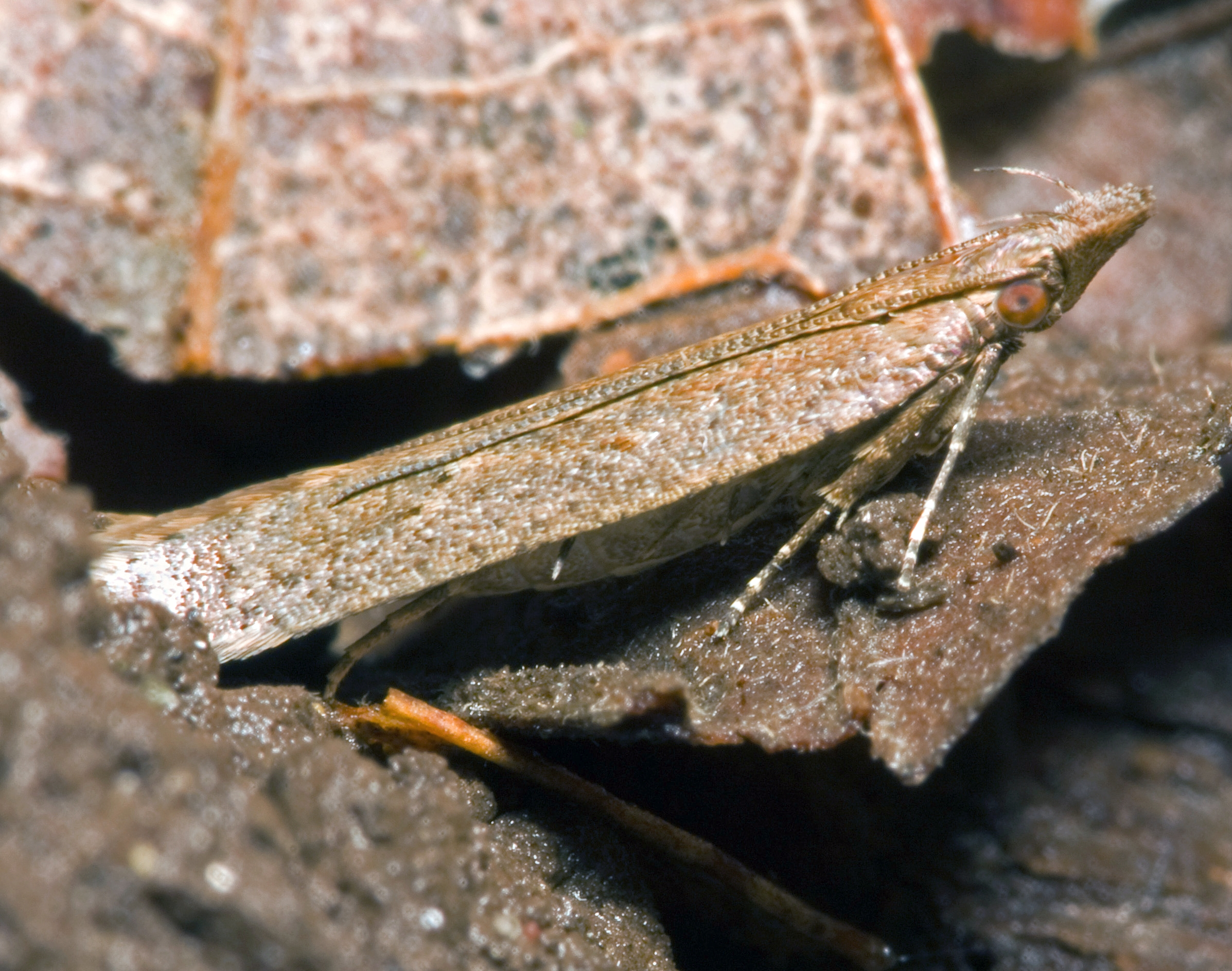
- Dichomeris ligulella

Scientific classification
- Domain: Eukaryota
- Kingdom: Animalia
- Phylum: Arthropoda
- Class: Insecta
- Order: Lepidoptera
- Family: Gelechiidae
- Tribe: Gelechiini
- Genus: Arla; Clarke, 1942

= Arla (moth) =

Genus of moths

Arla is a genus of moths in the family Gelechiidae.

== Species ==
The genus contains the following species:

- Arla diversella (Busck, 1916)
- Arla tenuicornis Clarke, 1942
