= Perioristica =

Scientific classification
- Kingdom: Animalia
- Phylum: Arthropoda
- Clade: Pancrustacea
- Class: Insecta
- Order: Lepidoptera
- Family: Gelechiidae
- Subfamily: Anacampsinae
- Genus: Perioristica; Walsingham, 1910
- Species: P. chalcopera

Binomial name
- Perioristica chalcopera Walsingham, 1910

Genus of moths

Perioristica is a genus of moth in the family Gelechiidae. It contains the species Perioristica chalcopera, which is found in Mexico (Guerrero).

The wingspan is about 10 mm. The forewings are bronzy-brown, overlaid on the basal half with a greenish grey iridescent sheen, the outer edge of which is obliquely terminated a little before the middle of the costa, and throws out a short white streak along the cell. Above this is a slender, oblique, detached white streaklet, and an outwardly oblique white costal streak, more or less connected by scattered whitish scales at its apex with the apex of the median streak, and again to the apex of a similar streak a little above the dorsum. At four-fifths is a second, short, straight white costal streak, loosely connected by scattered scales, at its apex, with a striated patch above the tornus, in which they form the upper of a series of three short longitudinal white streaks, bounded before and behind by a whitish line. On the costa at the apex are two converging wedge-shaped white streaks, divided by a dark brown line, which is continued along the termen to the tornus. The outer of these is wider than the inner, and forms the base of the caudate apical extension of the cilia which are bronzy brown beyond it, those on the termen below being bright rosy, iridescent, brassy metallic. The hindwings and cilia are brown, with iridescent, bluish, steely grey reflections.
