= Pseudochelaria arbutina =

Scientific classification
- Domain: Eukaryota
- Kingdom: Animalia
- Phylum: Arthropoda
- Class: Insecta
- Order: Lepidoptera
- Family: Gelechiidae
- Genus: Pseudochelaria
- Species: P. arbutina

Binomial name
- Pseudochelaria arbutina (Keifer, 1930)

Synonyms
- Gelechia arbutina Keifer, 1930

Species of moth

Pseudochelaria arbutina is a moth of the family Gelechiidae. It was described by Keifer in 1930. It is found in North America, where it has been recorded from California.
