= Parabola butyraula =

Scientific classification
- Kingdom: Animalia
- Phylum: Arthropoda
- Clade: Pancrustacea
- Class: Insecta
- Order: Lepidoptera
- Family: Gelechiidae
- Subfamily: Anacampsinae
- Genus: Parabola; Janse, 1950
- Species: P. butyraula

Binomial name
- Parabola butyraula (Meyrick, 1913)

Synonyms
- Idiophantis butyraula Meyrick, 1913

Species of moth

Parabola is a monotypic moth genus in the family Gelechiidae erected by Anthonie Johannes Theodorus Janse in 1950. Its only species, Parabola butyraula, was first described by Edward Meyrick in 1913. It is found in Mpumalanga, South Africa.

The wingspan is about 15 mm. The forewings are fuscous with a broad light ochreous-yellow streak along the dorsum throughout, from beyond the middle dilated so as to reach halfway across the wing. There is a fine strongly curved violet-whitish line from three-fourths of the costa to the tornus, finely edged with dark fuscous posteriorly, margined anteriorly by an ochreous-yellow line edged with a few fuscous scales, and posteriorly on the upper half by a similar line terminated beneath by a blackish dot. The apical prominence is silvery whitish. The hindwings are pale greyish, on the tornus tinged with whitish ochreous.
