= Prostomeus =

Scientific classification
- Domain: Eukaryota
- Kingdom: Animalia
- Phylum: Arthropoda
- Class: Insecta
- Order: Lepidoptera
- Family: Gelechiidae
- Tribe: Chelariini
- Genus: Prostomeus; Busck, 1903
- Species: P. brunneus

Binomial name
- Prostomeus brunneus Busck, 1903

Genus of moths

Prostomeus is a genus of moths in the family Gelechiidae. It contains only one species, Prostomeus brunneus, which is found in Cuba and the south-eastern United States, where it has been recorded from Alabama, Florida, Mississippi and North Carolina.

== Description ==
The wingspan is 15-15.5 mm. The forewings are light straw colored, overlaid with reddish brown and with the base dark purplish brown. There is a dark purplish brown oblong narrow patch along the middle of the costa from the basal fourth to the apical third. A larger similar patch is found on the dorsal edge, projecting up in the light middle part of the wing a boot-shaped figure, with the toe on the center of the cell, and the heel midway between this and a unicolorous circular spot at the end of the cell. The tornus is dark brown, and the apical veins are slightly indicated by darker brown streaks. There is a row of dark, purplish-brown dots around the apex at the base of the cilia. The hindwings are dark steel gray, lighter toward the base.
