= Parastega =

Scientific classification
- Kingdom: Animalia
- Phylum: Arthropoda
- Clade: Pancrustacea
- Class: Insecta
- Order: Lepidoptera
- Family: Gelechiidae
- Subfamily: Gelechiinae
- Genus: Parastega; Meyrick, 1912

Genus of moths

Parastega is a genus of moth in the family Gelechiidae.

== Species ==
- Parastega chionostigma (Walsingham, 1911)
- Parastega hemisigna Clarke, 1951
- Parastega niveisignella (Zeller, 1877)
- Parastega trichella Busck, 1914
