= Holcophora =

Scientific classification
- Kingdom: Animalia
- Phylum: Arthropoda
- Clade: Pancrustacea
- Class: Insecta
- Order: Lepidoptera
- Family: Gelechiidae
- Tribe: Chelariini
- Genus: Holcophora; Staudinger, 1871
- Species: H. statices

Binomial name
- Holcophora statices Staudinger, 1871

Genus of moths

Holcophora is a genus of moth in the family Gelechiidae. It contains only one species, Holcophora statices, which is found in Hungary, Romania, Ukraine and Russia.

The wingspan is 17–21 mm. The forewings are ashy grey with obscure markings. The hindwings are shining grey.
