= Commatica =

Scientific classification
- Domain: Eukaryota
- Kingdom: Animalia
- Phylum: Arthropoda
- Class: Insecta
- Order: Lepidoptera
- Family: Gelechiidae
- Subfamily: Gelechiinae
- Genus: Commatica; Meyrick, 1909

Synonyms
- Apopira Walsingham, 1911; Simoneura Walsingham, 1911

Genus of moths

Commatica is a genus of moths in the family Gelechiidae.

== Species ==
- Commatica acropelta Meyrick, 1914
- Commatica bifuscella (Forbes, 1931)
- Commatica chionura Meyrick, 1914
- Commatica crossotorna Meyrick, 1929
- Commatica cryptina (Walsingham, 1911)
- Commatica cyanorrhoa Meyrick, 1914
- Commatica emplasta Meyrick, 1914
- Commatica eremna Meyrick, 1909
- Commatica extremella (Walker, 1864)
- Commatica falcatella (Walker, 1864)
- Commatica hexacentra Meyrick, 1922
- Commatica lupata Meyrick, 1914
- Commatica metochra Meyrick, 1914
- Commatica nerterodes Meyrick, 1914
- Commatica ophitis (Walsingham, 1911)
- Commatica palirrhoa Meyrick, 1922
- Commatica parmulata Meyrick, 1914
- Commatica phanocrossa Meyrick, 1922
- Commatica placoterma Meyrick, 1918
- Commatica pterygota Meyrick, 1929
- Commatica servula Meyrick, 1922
- Commatica stygia Meyrick, 1922
- Commatica xanthocarpa Meyrick, 1922
