= Pessograptis =

Scientific classification
- Domain: Eukaryota
- Kingdom: Animalia
- Phylum: Arthropoda
- Class: Insecta
- Order: Lepidoptera
- Family: Gelechiidae
- Tribe: Chelariini
- Genus: Pessograptis; Meyrick, 1923

Genus of moths

Pessograptis is a genus of moth in the family Gelechiidae.

== Species ==
- Pessograptis cancellata Meyrick, 1914
- Pessograptis cyanactis Meyrick, 1930
- Pessograptis thalamias Meyrick, 1923
