= Amphitrias =

Scientific classification
- Kingdom: Animalia
- Phylum: Arthropoda
- Class: Insecta
- Order: Lepidoptera
- Family: Depressariidae
- Genus: Amphitrias; Meyrick, 1908
- Species: A. cynica

Binomial name
- Amphitrias cynica Meyrick, 1908

Genus of moths

Amphitrias is a genus of moth in the family Depressariidae. It contains the species Amphitrias cynica, which is found in Sri Lanka.

The wingspan is 17–21 mm. The forewings are ochreous-whitish, usually with some scattered irregular pale fuscous irroration or suffusion, especially beyond the cell and towards the tornus. The discal stigmata are dark fuscous and there is a row of blackish marginal dots around the apex and termen. The hindwings are ochreous-whitish.
