= Clepsimacha =

Scientific classification
- Kingdom: Animalia
- Phylum: Arthropoda
- Class: Insecta
- Order: Lepidoptera
- Family: Gelechiidae
- Genus: Clepsimacha; Meyrick, 1934
- Species: C. eriocrossa

Binomial name
- Clepsimacha eriocrossa Meyrick, 1934

Synonyms
- Cratinitis Meyrick, 1935; Cratinitis tubigera Meyrick, 1935

Genus of moths

Clepsimacha is a genus of moths in the family Gelechiidae. It contains the species Clepsimacha eriocrossa, which is found in Taiwan.
