= Alsodryas =

Scientific classification
- Kingdom: Animalia
- Phylum: Arthropoda
- Class: Insecta
- Order: Lepidoptera
- Family: Gelechiidae
- Genus: Alsodryas; Meyrick, 1914

Genus of moths

Alsodryas is a genus of moths in the family Gelechiidae.

== Species ==
- Alsodryas deltochlora Meyrick, 1922
- Alsodryas lactaria Meyrick, 1914
- Alsodryas prasinoptila Meyrick, 1922
