= Parapodia sinaica =

Scientific classification
- Domain: Eukaryota
- Kingdom: Animalia
- Phylum: Arthropoda
- Class: Insecta
- Order: Lepidoptera
- Superfamily: Gelechioidea
- Family: Gelechiidae
- Subfamily: Anomologinae
- Genus: Parapodia de Joannis, 1912
- Species: P. sinaica

Binomial name
- Parapodia sinaica (Frauenfeld, 1859)

Synonyms
- Cecidonostola Amsel, 1958; Gelechia sinaica Frauenfeld, 1859; Parapodia tamaricicola de Joannis, 1912; Cecidonostola tamariciella Amsel, 1958

Species of moth

Parapodia is a monotypic moth genus in the family Gelechiidae described by Joseph de Joannis in 1859. It contains the species Parapodia sinaica, described by Georg Ritter von Frauenfeld in 1859, which is found in Arabia, the Sinai desert, Palestine and southern France.

The wingspan is about 15 mm.

The larvae feed on Tamarix gallica, causing a swelling of a branch of the host plant, containing several larvae.

== Gallery ==
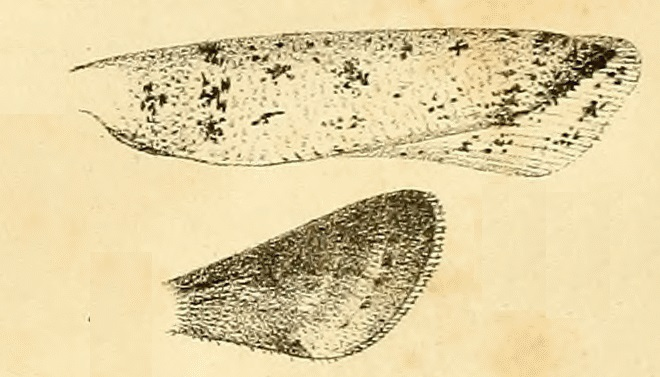
Wing

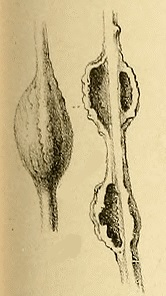
Feeding damage
