= Euchaetis coccoscela =

Scientific classification
- Kingdom: Animalia
- Phylum: Arthropoda
- Clade: Pancrustacea
- Class: Insecta
- Order: Lepidoptera
- Family: Oecophoridae
- Genus: Euchaetis
- Species: E. coccoscela

Binomial name
- Euchaetis coccoscela (Turner, 1946)

Synonyms
- Machimia coccoscela Turner, 1946

Species of moth

Euchaetis coccoscela is a moth in the family Oecophoridae. It was described by Alfred Jefferis Turner in 1946. It is found in Australia, where it has been recorded from Western Australia.
