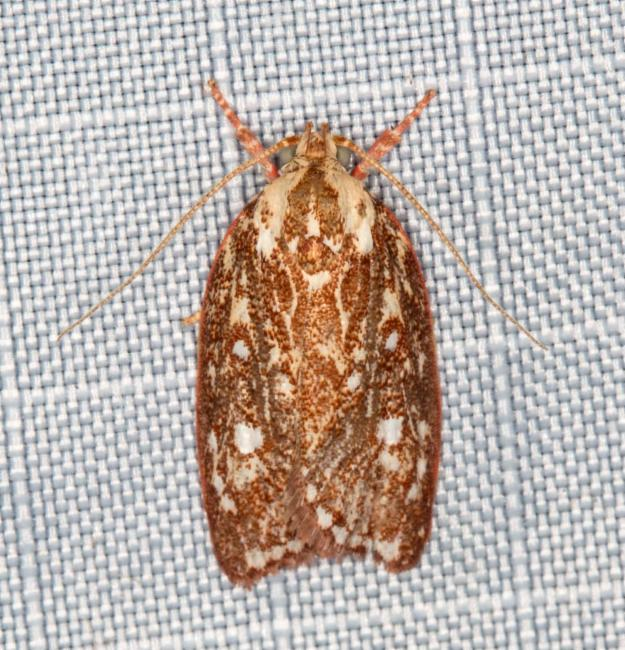

Scientific classification
- Kingdom: Animalia
- Phylum: Arthropoda
- Clade: Pancrustacea
- Class: Insecta
- Order: Lepidoptera
- Family: Oecophoridae
- Genus: Euchaetis
- Species: E. metallota

Binomial name
- Euchaetis metallota Meyrick, 1883

Synonyms
- Heliocausta metallota

= Euchaetis metallota =

Species of moth

Euchaetis metallota is a moth of the family Oecophoridae. It is found in Australia, where it has been recorded from Queensland, New South Wales, the Australian Capital Territory, Victoria, South Australia and Western Australia.

The wingspan is about 25 mm.

The larvae feed on Eucalyptus vernicosa. Feeding from inside a gall.
