= Euchaetis endoleuca =

Scientific classification
- Kingdom: Animalia
- Phylum: Arthropoda
- Clade: Pancrustacea
- Class: Insecta
- Order: Lepidoptera
- Family: Oecophoridae
- Genus: Euchaetis
- Species: E. endoleuca

Binomial name
- Euchaetis endoleuca Meyrick, 1888

Synonyms
- Machimia baliosticha Meyrick, 1888

Species of moth

Euchaetis endoleuca is a moth in the family Oecophoridae. It was described by Edward Meyrick in 1888. It is found in Australia, where it has been recorded from South Australia and Western Australia.

The wingspan is about 30 mm. The forewings are pale greyish ochreous, closely sprinkled with light brown reddish and with a rosy costal edge, except near the apex. The markings are blackish. There is a large dot on the inner margin near the base, and two small dots above it, as well as a dot in the disc at one-fourth, connected with the inner margin before the middle by a cloudy irregular line. There is also a dot in the disc before the middle, a second on the fold rather beyond it and a third in the disc at two-thirds. There is a very indistinct oblique irregular transverse line passing through the first two of these, and another more curved through the third, tending to unite in a suffusion on the inner margin. A well-marked series of dots runs from the costa beyond the middle to the inner margin before the anal angle, unevenly bent outwards and there is a hindmarginal row of small dots. The hindwings are whitish, with a rather narrow suffused pale fuscous hindmarginal border.
