= Nevadopalpa deaurata =

Scientific classification
- Kingdom: Animalia
- Phylum: Arthropoda
- Clade: Pancrustacea
- Class: Insecta
- Order: Lepidoptera
- Family: Gelechiidae
- Genus: Nevadopalpa
- Species: N. deaurata

Binomial name
- Nevadopalpa deaurata Povolný, 1999

Species of moth

Nevadopalpa deaurata is a moth in the family Gelechiidae. It was described by Povolný in 1999. It is found in North America, where it has been recorded from California.
