= Nevadopalpa =

Scientific classification
- Kingdom: Animalia
- Phylum: Arthropoda
- Clade: Pancrustacea
- Class: Insecta
- Order: Lepidoptera
- Family: Gelechiidae
- Tribe: Gnorimoschemini
- Genus: Nevadopalpa; Povolný, 1998

Genus of moths

Nevadopalpa is a genus of moth in the family Gelechiidae.

== Species ==
- Nevadopalpa alboaura Povolný, 1999
- Nevadopalpa albula Povolný, 1998
- Nevadopalpa deaurata Povolný, 1999
- Nevadopalpa maculata Povolný, 1999
- Nevadopalpa minor Povolný, 1998
- Nevadopalpa nevadana Povolný, 1999
- Nevadopalpa striata Povolný, 1998
