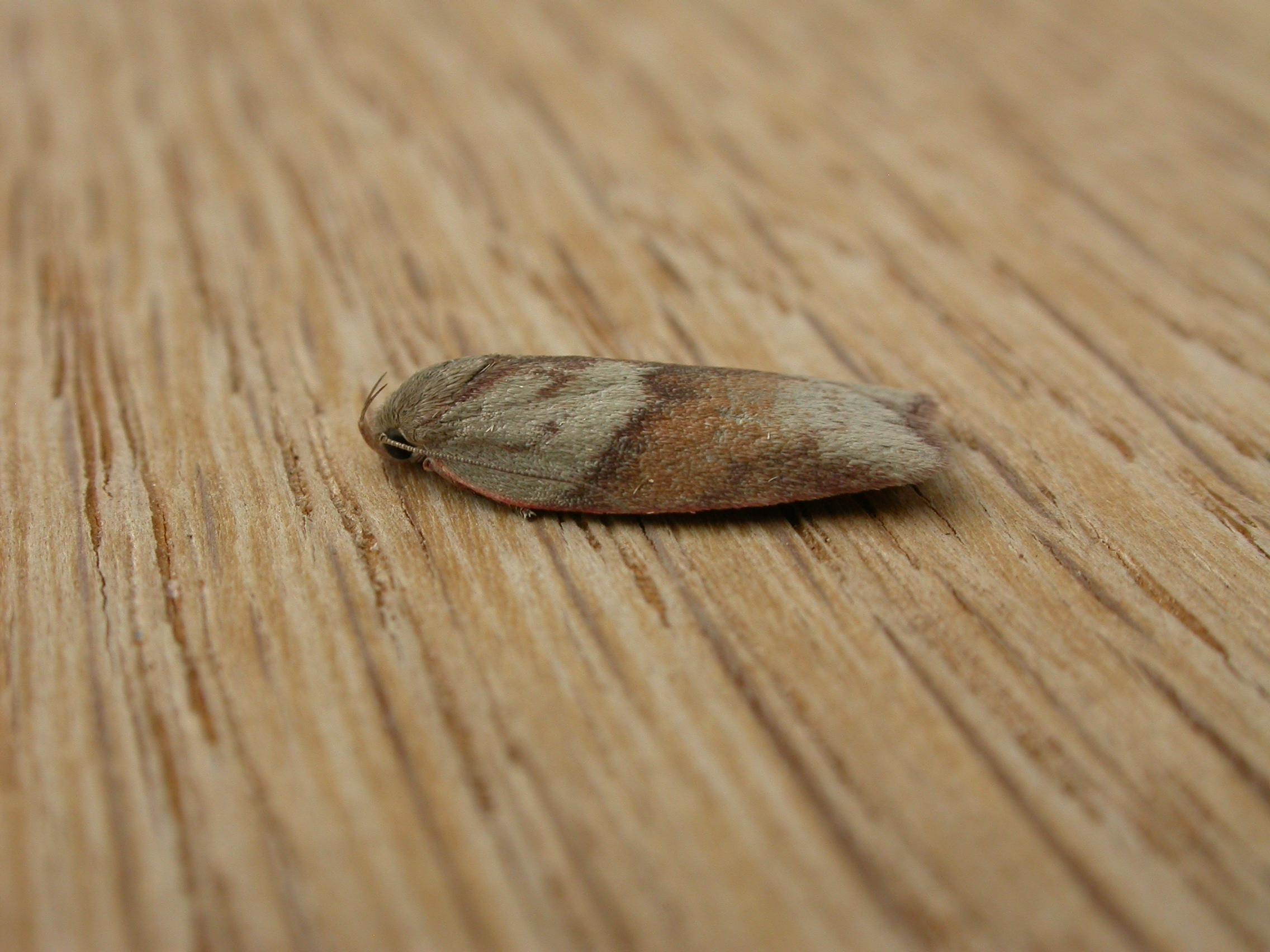

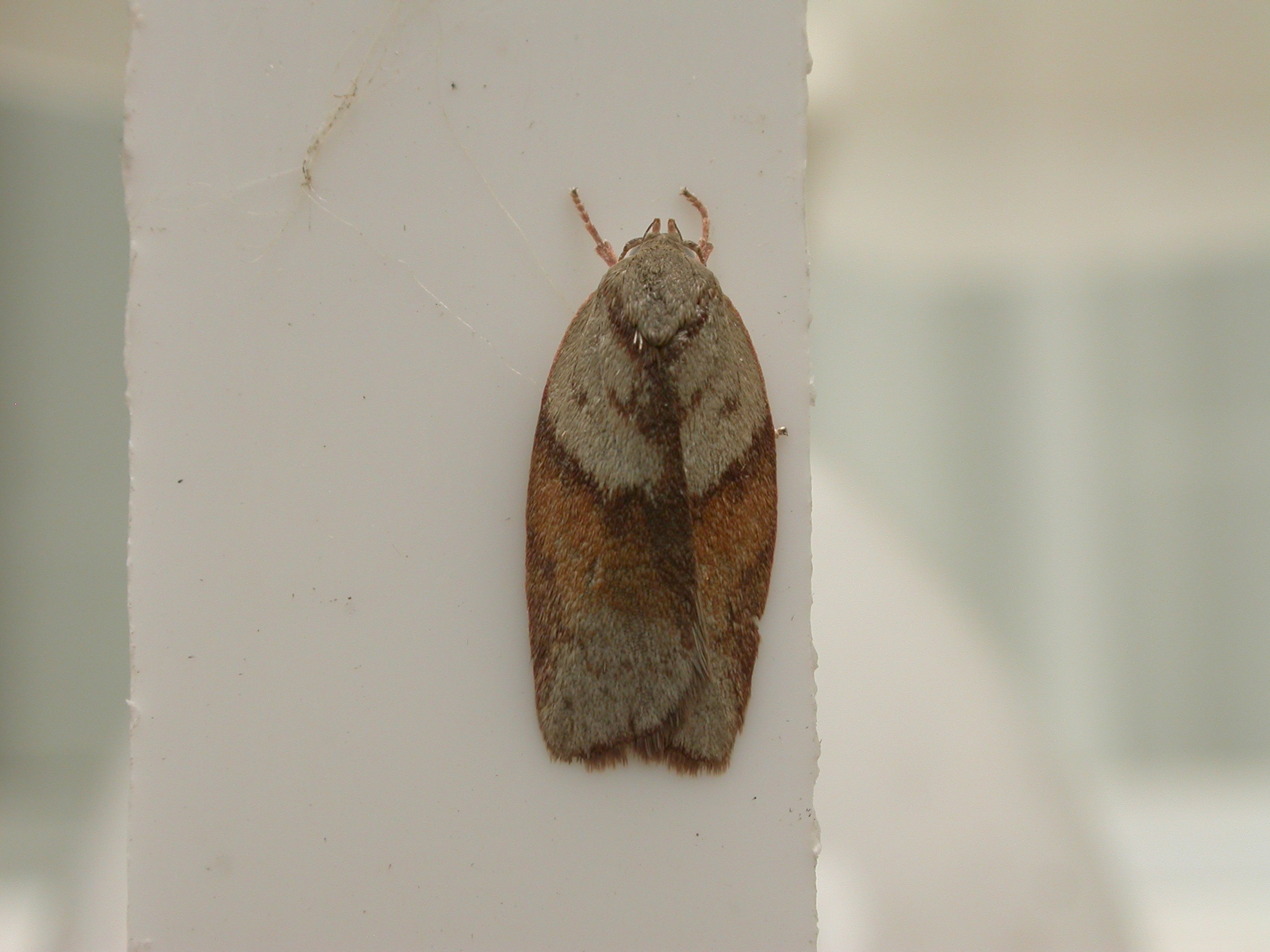

Scientific classification
- Kingdom: Animalia
- Phylum: Arthropoda
- Clade: Pancrustacea
- Class: Insecta
- Order: Lepidoptera
- Family: Oecophoridae
- Genus: Euchaetis
- Species: E. iozona

Binomial name
- Euchaetis iozona (Lower, 1893)

Synonyms
- Heliocausta iozona Lower, 1893; Heliocausta episarca Lower, 1903

= Euchaetis iozona =

Species of moth

Euchaetis iozona is a moth of the family Oecophoridae. It is known from New South Wales, South Australia, Western Australia and Victoria.

The wingspan is about 34 mm. The forewings are dull ochreous-reddish with the costal edge bright carmine throughout and with a dull purplish-fuscous moderate transverse oblique fascia from just beneath the costa at one-third to beyond the middle of the inner margin, broadest below. There is a purplish-fuscous discal spot at two-thirds in the middle and a very faintly indicated fuscous line from the costa at three-fourths, then curved outwards and ending at the anal angle. The hindwings are pale ochreous.

The larvae feed on the green leaves of Eucalyptus species. They live in a silken tube between tied green leaves.
