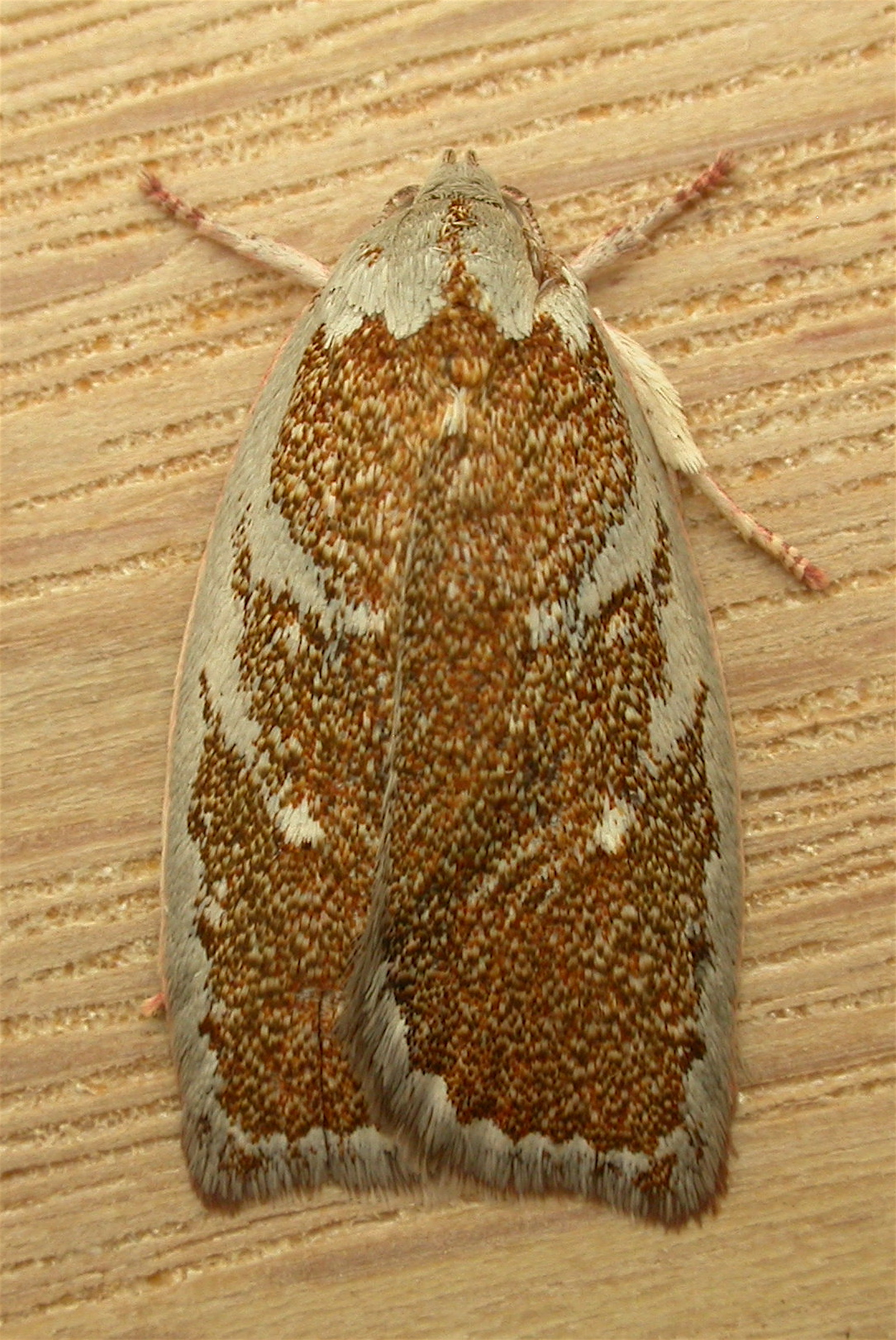
- Euchaetis rhizobola

Scientific classification
- Kingdom: Animalia
- Phylum: Arthropoda
- Clade: Pancrustacea
- Class: Insecta
- Order: Lepidoptera
- Family: Oecophoridae
- Subfamily: Oecophorinae
- Genus: Euchaetis; Meyrick, 1883

Species
- See text

= Euchaetis (moth) =

Genus of moths

Euchaetis is a genus of moths of the family Oecophoridae.

== Species ==
- Euchaetis coccoscela (Turner, 1946)
- Euchaetis crypsichroa Lower, 1893
- Euchaetis cryptorrhoda (Turner, 1946)
- Euchaetis endoleuca Meyrick, 1888
- Euchaetis euspilomela (Lower, 1893)
- Euchaetis habrocosma Meyrick, 1883
- Euchaetis holoclera Meyrick, 1888
- Euchaetis incarnatella (Walker, 1864)
- Euchaetis inceptella (Walker, 1864)
- Euchaetis inclusella (Walker, 1864)
- Euchaetis insana (Meyrick, 1921)
- Euchaetis iospila Meyrick, 1888
- Euchaetis iozona (Lower, 1893)
- Euchaetis metallota Meyrick, 1883
- Euchaetis parthenopa (Meyrick, 1883)
- Euchaetis poliarcha Meyrick, 1888
- Euchaetis rhizobola Meyrick, 1888
- Euchaetis rhodochila (Turner, 1946)
- Euchaetis rufogrisea (Meyrick, 1883)
