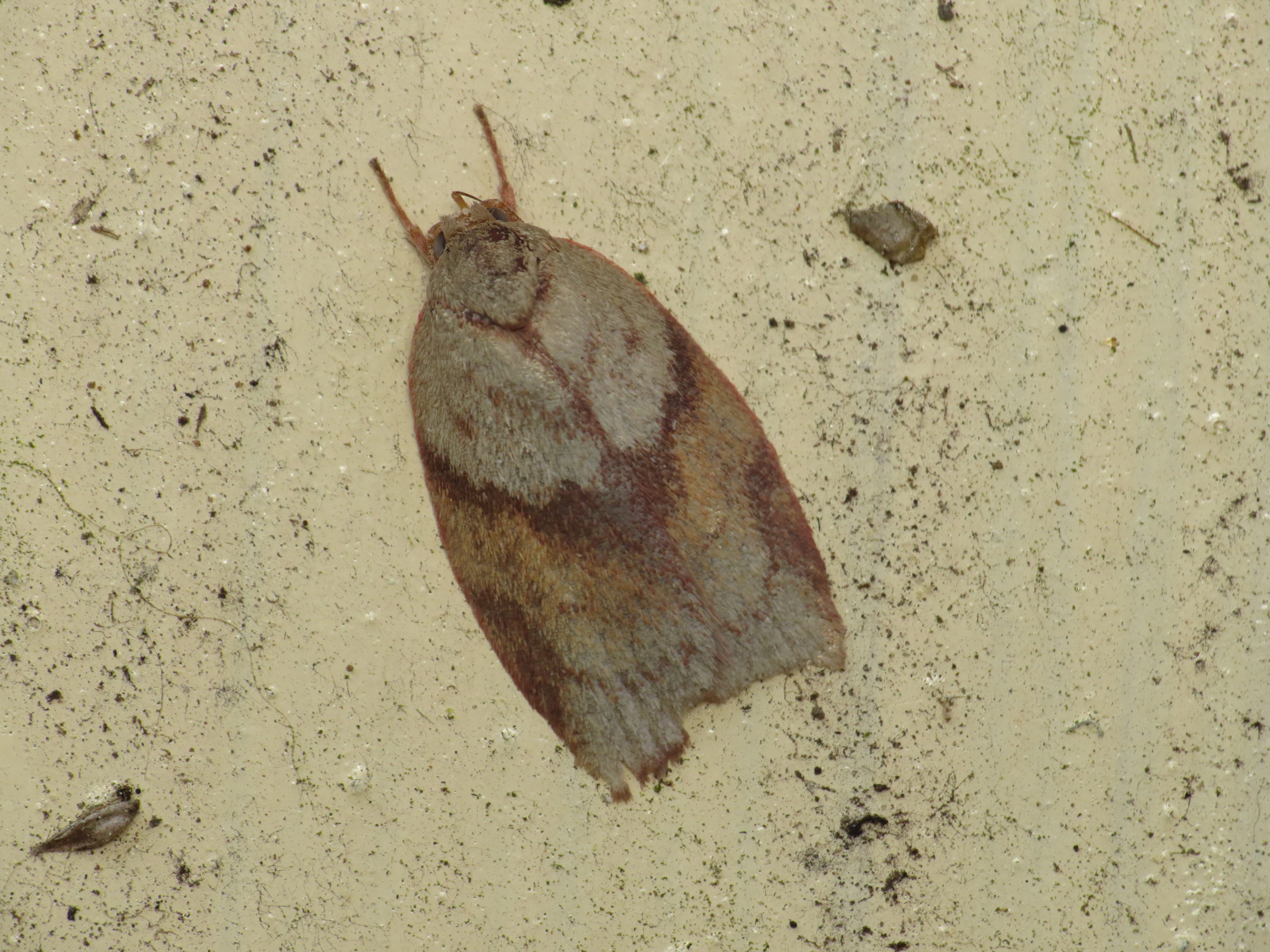

Scientific classification
- Kingdom: Animalia
- Phylum: Arthropoda
- Clade: Pancrustacea
- Class: Insecta
- Order: Lepidoptera
- Family: Oecophoridae
- Genus: Euchaetis
- Species: E. crypsichroa

Binomial name
- Euchaetis crypsichroa Lower, 1893

Synonyms
- Machimia notoporphyra Turner, 1946

= Euchaetis crypsichroa =

Species of moth

Euchaetis crypsichroa is a moth in the family Oecophoridae. It was described by Oswald Bertram Lower in 1893. It is found in Australia, where it has been recorded from South Australia.
