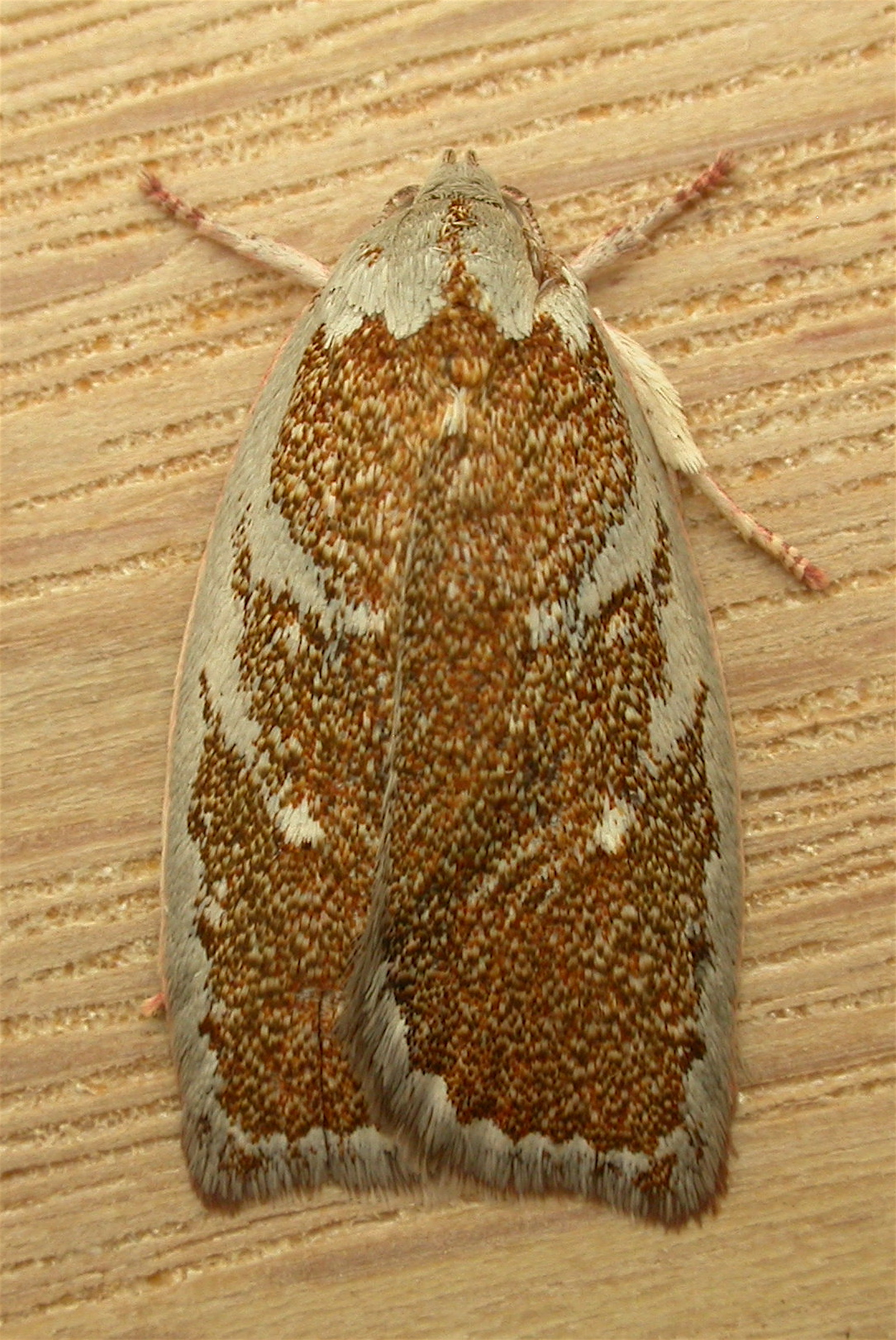

Scientific classification
- Kingdom: Animalia
- Phylum: Arthropoda
- Clade: Pancrustacea
- Class: Insecta
- Order: Lepidoptera
- Family: Oecophoridae
- Genus: Euchaetis
- Species: E. rhizobola

Binomial name
- Euchaetis rhizobola Meyrick, 1888

= Euchaetis rhizobola =

Species of moth

Euchaetis rhizobola is a moth of the family Oecophoridae. It is found in Australia, including New South Wales, Queensland, the Australian Capital Territory, Victoria, South Australia and Western Australia.

The wingspan is 31–33 mm. The forewings are ferruginous, irrorated with very pale greyish-ochreous and with very pale greyish-ochreous; markings and a rosy costal edge. There is a short streak along the base of the inner margin, forming a spot at the base and a moderate rather irregular-edged costal streak, rather broad at the base, emitting two irregular oblique wedge-shaped projections, at one-fourth and the middle, first running to the fold before middle, the second to a whitish dot in the disc at three-fifths. There are three ill-defined grey-whitish dots beneath the posterior half of the costal streak, almost confluent with it and there is a grey whitish submarginal line, becoming marginal on the lower half of the hindmargin and with the anterior edge waved. The hindwings are pale whitish-ochreous, yellowish-tinged and with the apex more ochreous-yellowish, sometimes slightly rosy-tinged.
