= Nevadopalpa albula =

Scientific classification
- Kingdom: Animalia
- Phylum: Arthropoda
- Clade: Pancrustacea
- Class: Insecta
- Order: Lepidoptera
- Family: Gelechiidae
- Genus: Nevadopalpa
- Species: N. albula

Binomial name
- Nevadopalpa albula Povolný, 1998

Species of moth

Nevadopalpa albula is a moth in the family Gelechiidae. It was described by Povolný in 1998. It is found in North America, where it has been recorded from California.
