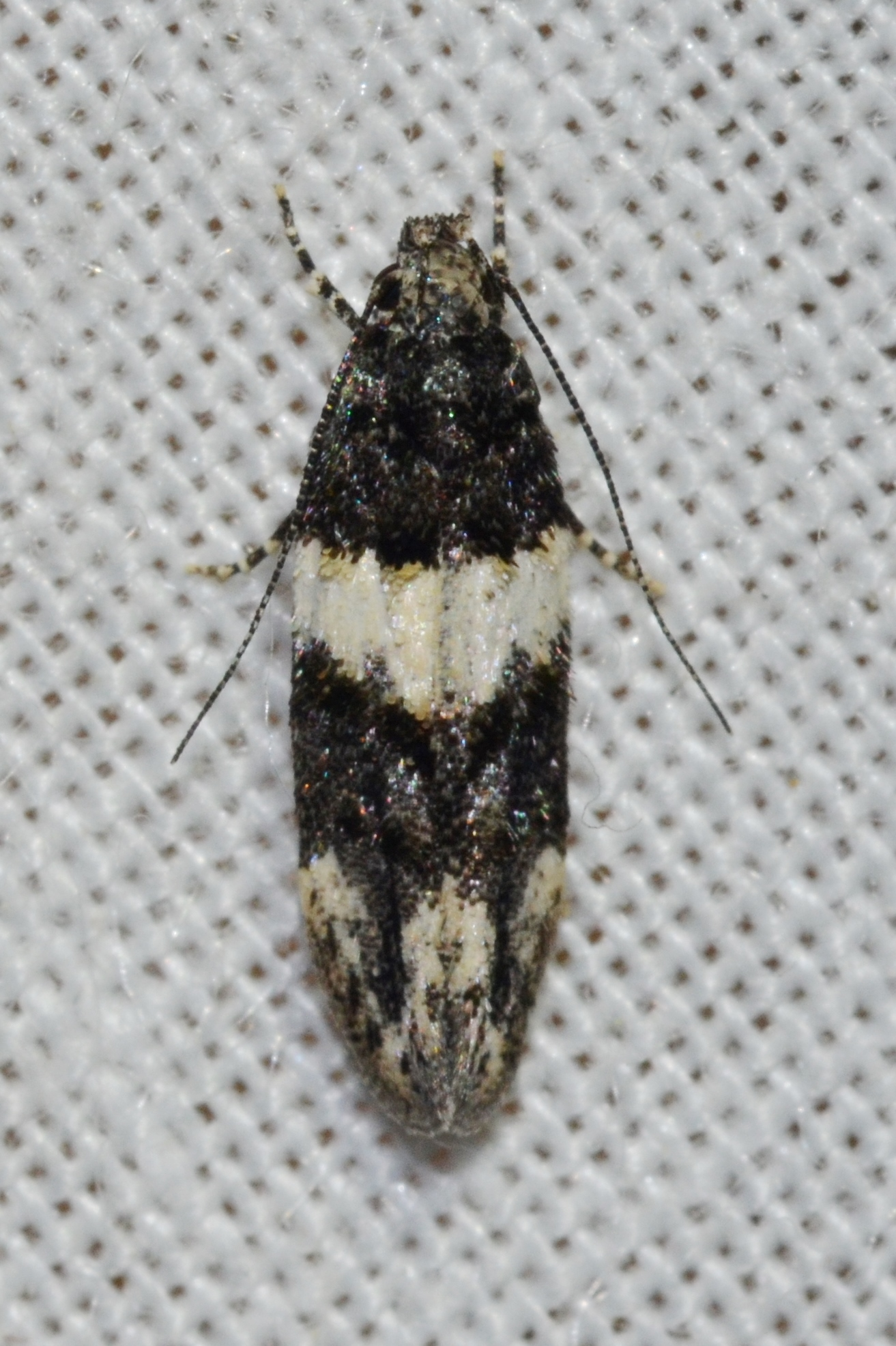

Scientific classification
- Kingdom: Animalia
- Phylum: Arthropoda
- Clade: Pancrustacea
- Class: Insecta
- Order: Lepidoptera
- Family: Gelechiidae
- Subfamily: Gelechiinae
- Tribe: Litini
- Genus: Pubitelphusa
- Species: P. latifasciella

Binomial name
- Pubitelphusa latifasciella (Chambers, 1875)

Synonyms
- Gelechia latifasciella Chambers, 1875; Telphusa latifasciella

= Pubitelphusa latifasciella =

White-banded telphusa moth

Species of moth

Pubitelphusa latifasciella, the white-banded telphusa moth, is a moth of the family Gelechiidae. It is found in North America, where it has been recorded from Alabama, Arkansas, Florida, Georgia, Illinois, Indiana, Kansas, Kentucky, Louisiana, Maryland, Minnesota, Mississippi, Missouri, New Jersey, New York, North Carolina, Ohio, Oklahoma, Ontario, Quebec, South Carolina, Tennessee, Texas, Virginia, West Virginia and Wisconsin.

The forewings are dark brown with a broad white fascia just before the middle of the wing, widest on the dorsal margin, and margined in front by two small raised tufts of white scales, one of which is above, and another beneath the fold. Behind the fascia is a transverse row of dark brown raised scales, behind which the wing is dark brown to the cilia, where it becomes gray from the large intermixture of white scales, and there is a small irregular patch of dark brown scales at the apex. Nearly opposite the beginning of the cilia are two raised tufts of dark brown raised scales, and just behind them is an indistinct narrow curved gray fascia.
