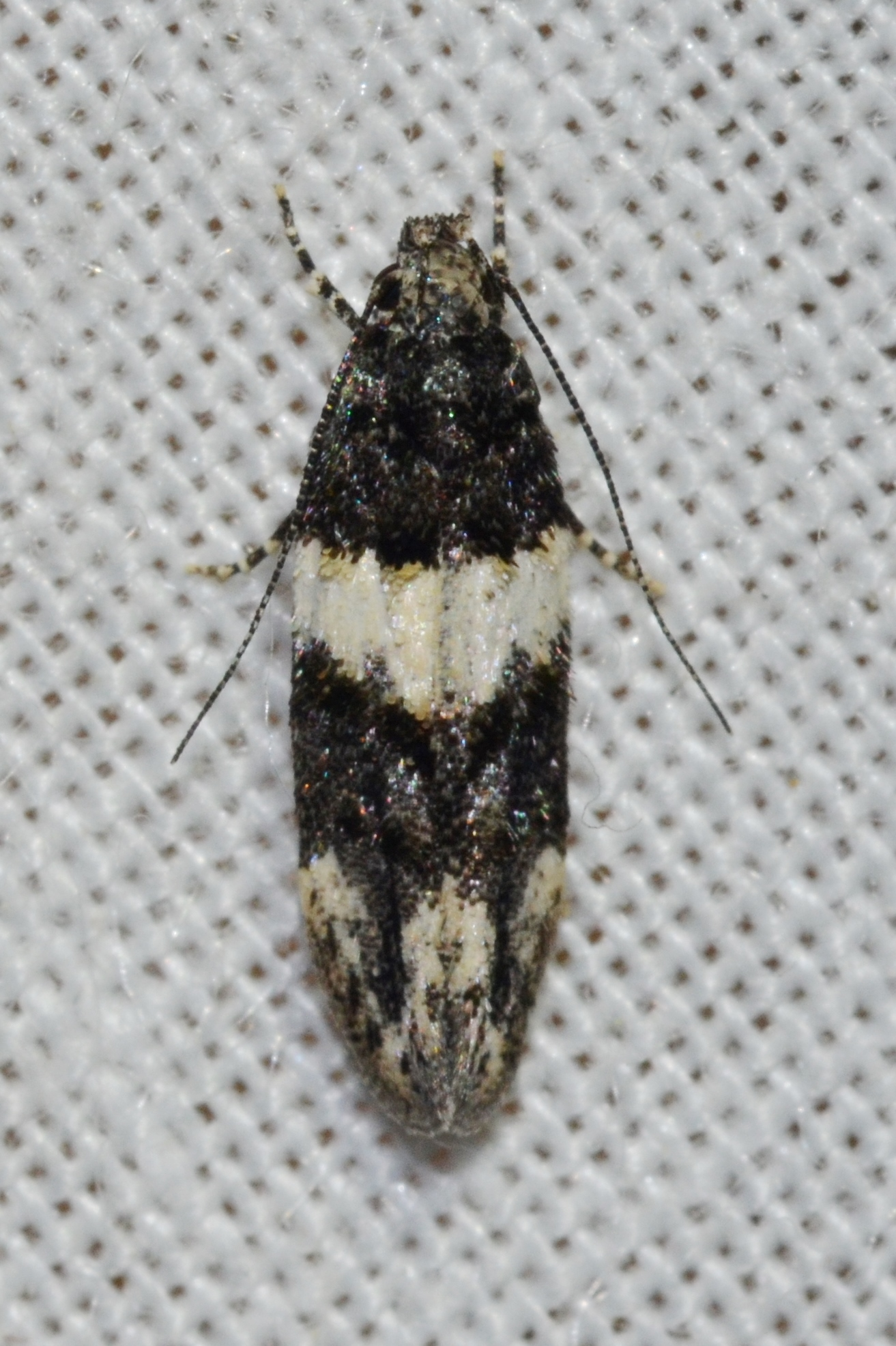
- Pubitelphusa latifasciella

Scientific classification
- Domain: Eukaryota
- Kingdom: Animalia
- Phylum: Arthropoda
- Class: Insecta
- Order: Lepidoptera
- Family: Gelechiidae
- Subfamily: Gelechiinae
- Tribe: Litini
- Genus: Pubitelphusa; Lee & Brown, 2013

= Pubitelphusa =

Genus of moths

Pubitelphusa is a genus of moths in the family Gelechiidae.

== Species ==
- Pubitelphusa latifasciella (Chambers, 1875)
- Pubitelphusa trigonalis (Park & Ponomarenko, 2007)
