= Pubitelphusa trigonalis =

Scientific classification
- Kingdom: Animalia
- Phylum: Arthropoda
- Class: Insecta
- Order: Lepidoptera
- Family: Gelechiidae
- Subfamily: Gelechiinae
- Tribe: Litini
- Genus: Pubitelphusa
- Species: P. trigonalis

Binomial name
- Pubitelphusa trigonalis (Park & Ponomarenko, 2007)

Synonyms
- Concubina trigonalis Park & Ponomarenko, 2007

Species of moth

Pubitelphusa trigonalis is a moth of the family Gelechiidae. It is found in Korea.

The wingspan is 14-14.5 mm.

== Etymology ==
The species name refers to the shape of the fusion of the vinculum and the sacculus and is derived from the Greek trigono.
