= Lysipatha =

Scientific classification
- Kingdom: Animalia
- Phylum: Arthropoda
- Class: Insecta
- Order: Lepidoptera
- Family: Gelechiidae
- Tribe: Gnorimoschemini
- Genus: Lysipatha; Meyrick, 1926

Genus of moths

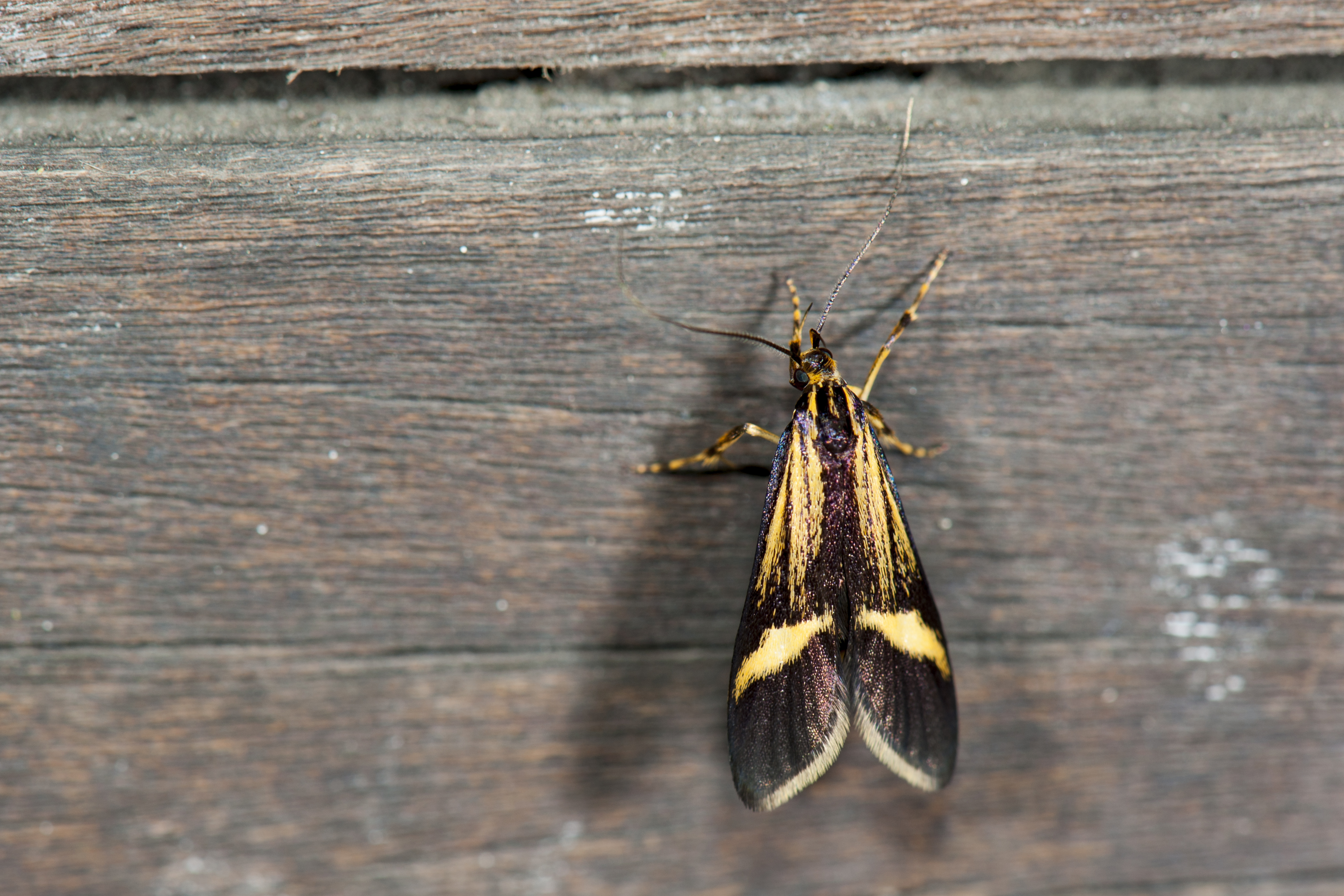

Lysipatha is a genus of moths in the family Gelechiidae.

== Species ==
- Lysipatha cyanoschista Meyrick, 1926
- Lysipatha diaxantha Meyrick, 1932
