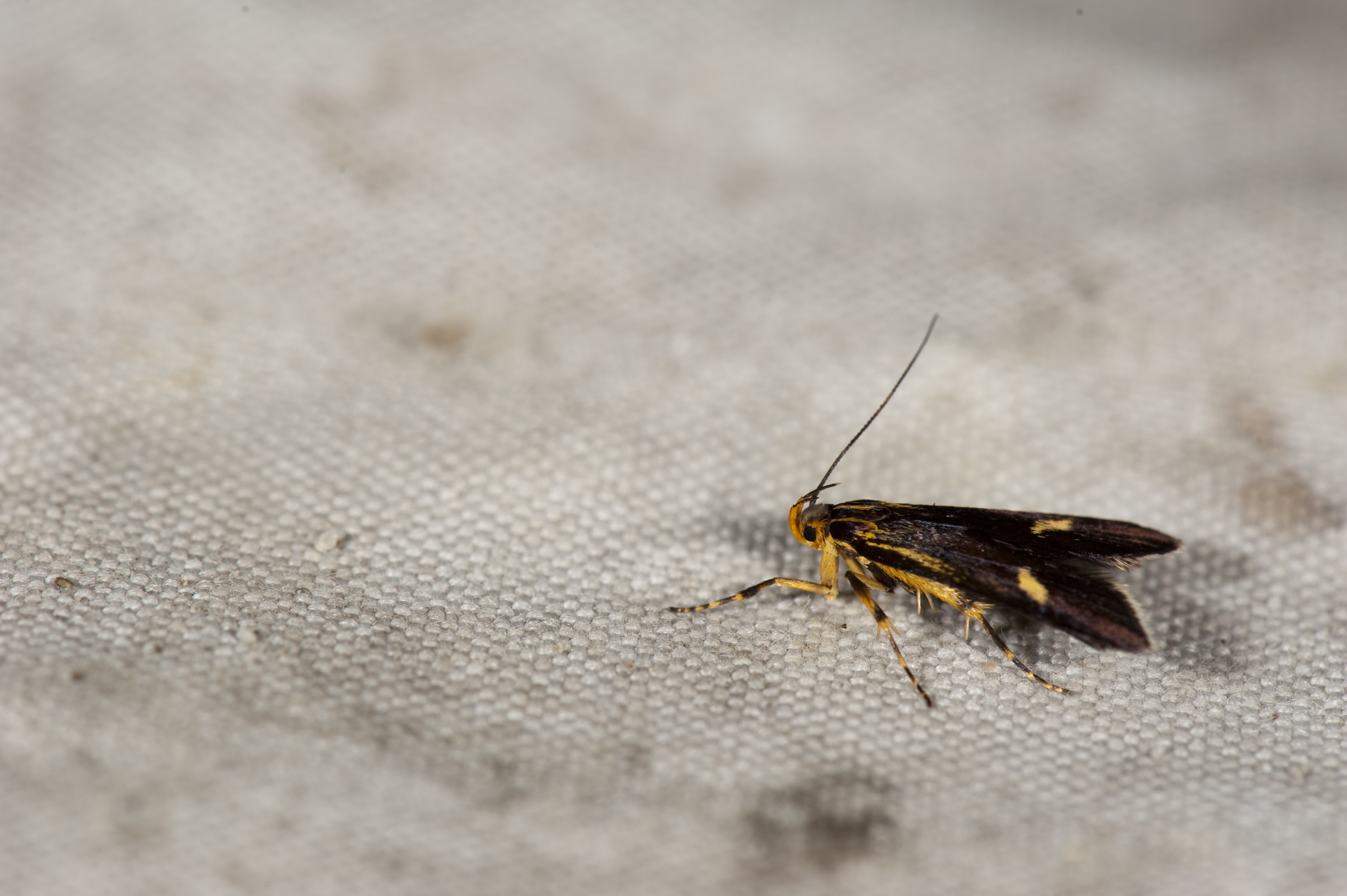

Scientific classification
- Kingdom: Animalia
- Phylum: Arthropoda
- Class: Insecta
- Order: Lepidoptera
- Family: Gelechiidae
- Genus: Lysipatha
- Species: L. diaxantha

Binomial name
- Lysipatha diaxantha Meyrick, 1932

Synonyms
- Lysipatha flavopicta Matsumura

= Lysipatha diaxantha =

Species of moth

Lysipatha diaxantha is a moth in the family Gelechiidae. It was described by Edward Meyrick in 1932. It is found in Taiwan.
