= Lysipatha cyanoschista =

Scientific classification
- Kingdom: Animalia
- Phylum: Arthropoda
- Class: Insecta
- Order: Lepidoptera
- Family: Gelechiidae
- Genus: Lysipatha
- Species: L. cyanoschista

Binomial name
- Lysipatha cyanoschista Meyrick, 1926

Species of moth

Lysipatha cyanoschista is a moth in the family Gelechiidae. It was described by Edward Meyrick in 1926. It is found on New Guinea.

The wingspan is about 15 mm. The forewings are blackish with three ochreous-yellow oval spots in a transverse series in the disc at one-third, the lowest more elongate anteriorly. There is an elongate-oval deep ochreous-yellow blotch extending in the disc from before the middle to four-fifths, with two acute posterior projections touching the termen. There is also a fine yellowish terminal line. The hindwings are deep ochreous yellow with a blackish costal band, with a triangular projecting lobe towards the base, and a projecting bar on the end of the cell, as well as a narrow irregular blackish fascia from this along three-fourths of the termen, with a submedian triangular projection.
