= Gonaepa josianella =

Scientific classification
- Kingdom: Animalia
- Phylum: Arthropoda
- Class: Insecta
- Order: Lepidoptera
- Family: Gelechiidae
- Genus: Gonaepa
- Species: G. josianella

Binomial name
- Gonaepa josianella Walker, 1866

Species of moth

Gonaepa josianella is a moth in the family Gelechiidae. It was described by Francis Walker in 1866. It is found in New Guinea.

Adults are cupreous, the forewings with a gilded luteous stripe along the interior border widening from the base and a slightly undulating gilded luteous submarginal line. The hindwings have a broad gilded luteous stripe, which is acutely dentate along its hind side and contains a cupreous dot.
