= Gonaepa =

Scientific classification
- Kingdom: Animalia
- Phylum: Arthropoda
- Class: Insecta
- Order: Lepidoptera
- Family: Gelechiidae
- Subfamily: Gelechiinae
- Genus: Gonaepa; Walker, 1866

Genus of moths

Gonaepa is a genus of moths in the family Gelechiidae.

== Species ==
- Gonaepa actinis Walsingham, 1915
- Gonaepa dysthyma Diakonoff, 1954
- Gonaepa heliarcha (Meyrick, 1886)
- Gonaepa josianella Walker, 1866
