= Gonaepa actinis =

Scientific classification
- Domain: Eukaryota
- Kingdom: Animalia
- Phylum: Arthropoda
- Class: Insecta
- Order: Lepidoptera
- Family: Gelechiidae
- Genus: Gonaepa
- Species: G. actinis

Binomial name
- Gonaepa actinis Walsingham, 1915

Species of moth

Gonaepa actinis is a moth in the family Gelechiidae. It was described by Thomas de Grey, 6th Baron Walsingham, in 1915. It is found in New Guinea.

The wingspan is 15–17 mm. The forewings are dark purplish fuscous at the base, along the costa, and at the apex and termen. From the dorsum at about one-third arises a bright orange-yellow band, reaching to two-thirds and tending obliquely outward to the commencement of the costal cilia. This band is much broken-up by narrow lines of the dark ground-colour, marking the direction of the veins and terminating in a dentate transverse fascia of the same colour, beyond which an equally dentate line of orange-yellow separates it from the terminal and apical area. A slender pale yellow marginal line precedes the richly purple cilia, which are faintly tipped with pale yellowish. The hindwings are bright orange-yellow, the same dentate bands passing across them before the dark purplish fuscous terminal area, but even more accentuated than in the forewings, with the same slender yellowish line at their base, a narrower deeper purple band, which is also visible in the forewings, clearly indicated throughout.
