= Gonaepa heliarcha =

Scientific classification
- Domain: Eukaryota
- Kingdom: Animalia
- Phylum: Arthropoda
- Class: Insecta
- Order: Lepidoptera
- Family: Gelechiidae
- Genus: Gonaepa
- Species: G. heliarcha

Binomial name
- Gonaepa heliarcha (Meyrick, 1886)

Synonyms
- Crocanthes heliarcha Meyrick, 1886

Species of moth

Gonaepa heliarcha is a moth in the family Gelechiidae. It was described by Edward Meyrick in 1886. It is found on New Guinea.

The wingspan is about 13 mm. The forewings are bright orange, with purplish black markings and a large basal patch, extending on the costa to two-thirds and on the inner margin to two-fifths, the outer edge is irregular, tolerably straight, with a small transverse spot in the middle of the disc. There is a hind marginal patch, bounded by a sinuate line from four-fifths of the costa to the anal angle. The hindwings are bright orange, with purplish-black markings. There is a short line along the costa beyond the middle, a crescentic inwards-curved spot in the disc beyond the middle and a narrow hind marginal band, somewhat dilated at the apex, with a small irregular prominence at three-fourths.
