= Hapalonoma =

Scientific classification
- Domain: Eukaryota
- Kingdom: Animalia
- Phylum: Arthropoda
- Class: Insecta
- Order: Lepidoptera
- Family: Gelechiidae
- Subfamily: Gelechiinae
- Genus: Hapalonoma; Meyrick, 1914

Genus of moths

Hapalonoma is a genus of moths in the family Gelechiidae.

== Species ==
- Hapalonoma sublustricella (Walker, 1864)
- Hapalonoma argyracta Meyrick, 1914
