= Hapalonoma sublustricella =

Scientific classification
- Kingdom: Animalia
- Phylum: Arthropoda
- Class: Insecta
- Order: Lepidoptera
- Family: Gelechiidae
- Genus: Hapalonoma
- Species: H. sublustricella

Binomial name
- Hapalonoma sublustricella (Walker, 1864)

Synonyms
- Gelechia sublustricella Walker, 1864

Species of moth

Hapalonoma sublustricella is a moth in the family Gelechiidae. It was described by Francis Walker in 1864. It is found in Amazonas, Brazil.

Adults are pale ochraceous, the forewings minutely black speckled, with a cupreous costal stripe, which is interrupted by two oblique pale lines, and does not extend to the tip. There is a cupreous mark at the base of the interior border and two irregular oblique cupreous streaks extending outward to the disc from one-third of the length of the interior border. There is also a submarginal chalybeous (steel-blue) band and a reddish tinge along the exterior part of the costa and along the fore part of the exterior border, which has a black line and is not oblique. The hindwings are aeneous (bronze coloured).
