= Hapalonoma argyracta =

Scientific classification
- Kingdom: Animalia
- Phylum: Arthropoda
- Class: Insecta
- Order: Lepidoptera
- Family: Gelechiidae
- Genus: Hapalonoma
- Species: H. argyracta

Binomial name
- Hapalonoma argyracta Meyrick, 1914

Species of moth

Hapalonoma argyracta is a moth in the family Gelechiidae. It was described by Edward Meyrick in 1914. It is found in Guyana.

The wingspan is 9–10 mm. The forewings are white or ochreous whitish, with some scattered dark fuscous scales and with a blackish streak along the basal third of the costa and elongate blackish costal marks beyond the middle and at three-fourths, the latter edged beneath with ferruginous. There is a dark fuscous dot above middle of the disc, sometimes with some dark suffusion around it. Some variable dark fuscous suffusion or irroration is found towards the dorsum and there is a silvery-metallic subdentate submarginal line around the posterior part of the costa and termen, preceded by an angulated whitish line and then by a band of light brownish suffusion, with an interrupted black dash on the angle of the line, the costa and apex beyond this ferruginous. The hindwings are dark grey.
