= Molopostola =

Scientific classification
- Domain: Eukaryota
- Kingdom: Animalia
- Phylum: Arthropoda
- Class: Insecta
- Order: Lepidoptera
- Family: Gelechiidae
- Genus: Molopostola; Meyrick, 1920

Genus of moths

Molopostola is a genus of moths in the family Gelechiidae.

== Species ==
- Molopostola calumnias Meyrick, 1926
- Molopostola rufitecta Meyrick, 1920
