= Molopostola calumnias =

Scientific classification
- Kingdom: Animalia
- Phylum: Arthropoda
- Class: Insecta
- Order: Lepidoptera
- Family: Gelechiidae
- Genus: Molopostola
- Species: M. calumnias

Binomial name
- Molopostola calumnias Meyrick, 1926

Species of moth

Molopostola calumnias is a moth in the family Gelechiidae. It was described by Edward Meyrick in 1926. It is found in Brazil.

The wingspan is about 14 mm for males and 21 mm for females. The forewings are shining white with the costal edge blackish near the base and with a streak of dark fuscous suffusion along the costa from before the middle to the apex, including a fine white striga from the costa at two-thirds, very obliquely to near the apex, the costa above this brownish. There is a broad irregular streak of fuscous suffusion more or less suffused with black in males, extending along the dorsum from one-fifth to the tornus but tending to be more or less interrupted beyond the middle. The discal stigmata are very small and blackish and there is some slight fuscous suffusion along the termen. The hindwings are grey.
