= Molopostola rufitecta =

Scientific classification
- Kingdom: Animalia
- Phylum: Arthropoda
- Class: Insecta
- Order: Lepidoptera
- Family: Gelechiidae
- Genus: Molopostola
- Species: M. rufitecta

Binomial name
- Molopostola rufitecta Meyrick, 1920

Species of moth

Molopostola rufitecta is a moth in the family Gelechiidae. It was described by Edward Meyrick in 1920. It is found in French Guiana.

The wingspan is 19–20 mm. The forewings are white, with irregularly scattered dark fuscous scales and an irregular black dot on the base of the costa, and one near the base in the middle. There is a black dot beneath the fold at one-fourth and a reddish-brown costal streak from before the middle to the apex, cut by a very oblique white striga from three-fourths of the costa, before this suffused dark fuscous on the costal edge. The discal stigmata are represented by small brown spots mixed dark fuscous and there is an elongate black mark towards the apex and one at the apex, as well as some dark fuscous irroration (sprinkles) towards the tornus. Two or three dots of blackish irroration are found on the lower part of the termen. The hindwings are grey.
