= Hierangela erythrogramma =

Scientific classification
- Kingdom: Animalia
- Phylum: Arthropoda
- Class: Insecta
- Order: Lepidoptera
- Family: Gelechiidae
- Genus: Hierangela
- Species: H. erythrogramma

Binomial name
- Hierangela erythrogramma Meyrick, 1894

Species of moth

Hierangela erythrogramma is a moth in the family Gelechiidae. It is found in Burma.

The wingspan is about 14 mm. The forewings are bright yellow with a crimson-red costal streak from the base to three-fourths, paler posteriorly, leaving the extreme costal edge whitish. There is a longitudinal median crimson-red streak from the base to the costa before the apex, interrupted at three-fourths. The space between this and the costal streak suffused with fuscous. There is also a small fuscous spot on the lower margin of the median streak before the middle and a transverse crimson-red spot from the inner margin near the base, meeting the median streak. A small red spot is found on the inner margin beyond this and a crimson-red streak runs along the inner margin from before the middle to the apex, interrupted above the anal angle and below the apex. The hindwings and cilia are grey, towards the anal angle whitish-grey.
