= Hierangela doxanthes =

Scientific classification
- Kingdom: Animalia
- Phylum: Arthropoda
- Class: Insecta
- Order: Lepidoptera
- Family: Gelechiidae
- Genus: Hierangela
- Species: H. doxanthes

Binomial name
- Hierangela doxanthes Meyrick, 1929

Species of moth

Hierangela doxanthes is a moth in the family Gelechiidae. It was described by Edward Meyrick in 1929. It is found on New Guinea.

The wingspan is about 14 mm.
