= Hierangela =

Scientific classification
- Domain: Eukaryota
- Kingdom: Animalia
- Phylum: Arthropoda
- Class: Insecta
- Order: Lepidoptera
- Family: Gelechiidae
- Subfamily: Gelechiinae
- Genus: Hierangela; Meyrick, 1894

Genus of moths

Hierangela is a genus of moth in the family Gelechiidae.

== Species ==
- Hierangela doxanthes Meyrick, 1929
- Hierangela erythrogramma Meyrick, 1894
