= Organitis characopa =

Scientific classification
- Kingdom: Animalia
- Phylum: Arthropoda
- Class: Insecta
- Order: Lepidoptera
- Family: Gelechiidae
- Genus: Organitis
- Species: O. characopa

Binomial name
- Organitis characopa Meyrick, 1906

Species of moth

Organitis characopa is a moth in the family Gelechiidae. It was described by Edward Meyrick in 1906. It is found in Sri Lanka.

The wingspan is 15–17 mm. The forewings are pale brassy ochreous suffused with light fuscous. The stigmata are rather large, dark fuscous, often elongate, with the plical very obliquely before the first discal, sometimes nearly obsolete, the discal stigmata sometimes connected by an obscure paler streak. The hindwings are pale fuscous.
