= Organitis =

Scientific classification
- Domain: Eukaryota
- Kingdom: Animalia
- Phylum: Arthropoda
- Class: Insecta
- Order: Lepidoptera
- Family: Gelechiidae
- Subfamily: Gelechiinae
- Genus: Organitis; Meyrick, 1906

Genus of moths

Organitis is a genus of moth in the family Gelechiidae.

== Species ==
- Organitis characopa Meyrick, 1906
- Organitis lubrica (Meyrick, 1910)
