= Organitis lubrica =

Scientific classification
- Kingdom: Animalia
- Phylum: Arthropoda
- Class: Insecta
- Order: Lepidoptera
- Family: Gelechiidae
- Genus: Organitis
- Species: O. lubrica

Binomial name
- Organitis lubrica (Meyrick, 1910)

Synonyms
- Onebala lubrica Meyrick, 1910

Species of moth

Organitis lubrica is a moth in the family Gelechiidae. It was described by Edward Meyrick in 1910. It is found in Sri Lanka.

The wingspan is about 13 mm. The forewings are glossy bronzy brownish with the second discal stigma large, cloudy, fuscous and very indistinct. The hindwings are grey.
