= Thrypsigenes colluta =

Scientific classification
- Kingdom: Animalia
- Phylum: Arthropoda
- Class: Insecta
- Order: Lepidoptera
- Family: Gelechiidae
- Genus: Thrypsigenes
- Species: T. colluta

Binomial name
- Thrypsigenes colluta Meyrick, 1914

Species of moth

Thrypsigenes colluta is a moth in the family Gelechiidae. It was described by Edward Meyrick in 1914. It is found in Guyana.

The wingspan is 10–13 mm. The forewings are whitish ochreous, faintly speckled with greyish. The hindwings are ochreous whitish or grey whitish.
