= Thrypsigenes furvescens =

Scientific classification
- Kingdom: Animalia
- Phylum: Arthropoda
- Class: Insecta
- Order: Lepidoptera
- Family: Gelechiidae
- Genus: Thrypsigenes
- Species: T. furvescens

Binomial name
- Thrypsigenes furvescens Meyrick, 1914

Species of moth

Thrypsigenes furvescens is a moth in the family Gelechiidae. It was described by Edward Meyrick in 1914. It is found in Guyana.

The wingspan is about 13 mm. The forewings are fuscous with a whitish-ochreous stripe occupying the costal third from the base to four-fifths. The hindwings are rather dark fuscous.
