= Thrypsigenes =

Scientific classification
- Domain: Eukaryota
- Kingdom: Animalia
- Phylum: Arthropoda
- Class: Insecta
- Order: Lepidoptera
- Family: Gelechiidae
- Subfamily: Gelechiinae
- Genus: Thrypsigenes; Meyrick, 1914

Genus of moths

Thrypsigenes is a genus of moths in the family Gelechiidae.

== Species ==
- Thrypsigenes colluta Meyrick, 1914
- Thrypsigenes furvescens Meyrick, 1914
