= Turcopalpa glaseri =

Scientific classification
- Kingdom: Animalia
- Phylum: Arthropoda
- Clade: Pancrustacea
- Class: Insecta
- Order: Lepidoptera
- Family: Gelechiidae
- Genus: Turcopalpa
- Species: T. glaseri

Binomial name
- Turcopalpa glaseri Povolný, 1973

Species of moth

Turcopalpa glaseri is a moth in the family Gelechiidae. It was described by Povolný in 1973. It is found in Turkey and Ukraine.

The length of the forewings is about 6 mm. The forewings are nearly uniform brown to brownish-grey, with three ill-defined dots. The hindwings are grey, but shading to dirty whitish at the base.
