= Turcopalpa =

Scientific classification
- Kingdom: Animalia
- Phylum: Arthropoda
- Clade: Pancrustacea
- Class: Insecta
- Order: Lepidoptera
- Family: Gelechiidae
- Tribe: Gnorimoschemini
- Genus: Turcopalpa; Povolný, 1973

Genus of moths

Turcopalpa is a genus of moth in the family Gelechiidae.

== Species ==
- Turcopalpa africana (Povolný, 1968)
- Turcopalpa glaseri Povolný, 1973
