= Turcopalpa africana =

Scientific classification
- Kingdom: Animalia
- Phylum: Arthropoda
- Clade: Pancrustacea
- Class: Insecta
- Order: Lepidoptera
- Family: Gelechiidae
- Genus: Turcopalpa
- Species: T. africana

Binomial name
- Turcopalpa africana (Povolný, 1968)

Synonyms
- Scrobipalpa africana Povolný, 1968

Species of moth

Turcopalpa africana is a moth in the family Gelechiidae. It was described by Povolný in 1968. It is found in Sudan, Egypt, Saudi Arabia and southern Iran.
