= Benguelasa =

Scientific classification
- Kingdom: Animalia
- Phylum: Arthropoda
- Clade: Pancrustacea
- Class: Insecta
- Order: Lepidoptera
- Family: Gelechiidae
- Subfamily: Gelechiinae
- Genus: Benguelasa; Bidzilya & Mey, 2011

Genus of moths

Benguelasa is a genus of moths in the family Gelechiidae.

== Species ==
- Benguelasa major Bidzilya & Mey, 2011
- Benguelasa minor Bidzilya & Mey, 2011
