= Benguelasa minor =

Scientific classification
- Kingdom: Animalia
- Phylum: Arthropoda
- Clade: Pancrustacea
- Class: Insecta
- Order: Lepidoptera
- Family: Gelechiidae
- Genus: Benguelasa
- Species: B. minor

Binomial name
- Benguelasa minor Bidzilya & Mey, 2011

Species of moth

Benguelasa minor is a moth in the family Gelechiidae. It was described by Oleksiy V. Bidzilya and Wolfram Mey in 2011. It is found in Namibia.
