= Cyanipennis =

Cyanipennis may refer to:

- Allocota cyanipennis, species of ground beetle in the Lebiinae subfamily
- Bacchisa cyanipennis, species of beetle in the family Cerambycidae
- Brachinus cyanipennis, species of ground beetle in the family Carabidae
- Chrysaethe cyanipennis, species of beetle in the family Cerambycidae
- Eumecomera cyanipennis, species of false blister beetle in the family Oedemeridae
- Gaurotes cyanipennis, species of beetle in the family Cerambycidae
- Glenea cyanipennis, species of beetle in the family Cerambycidae
- Glyptina cyanipennis, species of flea beetle in the family Chrysomelidae
- Ideratus cyanipennis, species of beetle in the family Cerambycidae
- Lampropterus cyanipennis, species of beetle in the family Cerambycidae
- Lebia cyanipennis, species of ground beetle in the family Carabidae
- Megachile cyanipennis, species of bee in the family Megachilidae
- Neocrepidodera cyanipennis, species of flea beetle in the family Chrysomelidae
- Omophoita cyanipennis, species of flea beetle in the family Chrysomelidae
- Paranitocris cyanipennis, species of beetle in the family Cerambycidae
- Phitryonus cyanipennis, species in the longhorn beetle family Cerambycidae
