= Dianella =

Dianella may refer to:

- Dianella (beetle), a species and genus of beetle in the family Carabidae now known as Diamella
- Dianella (gastropod), a genus of freshwater snails in the family Hydrobiidae
- Dianella (plant), a genus of flowering plants
- Dianella, Western Australia, a suburb of Perth, Australia
  - Dianella White Eagles, a football club from the suburb
