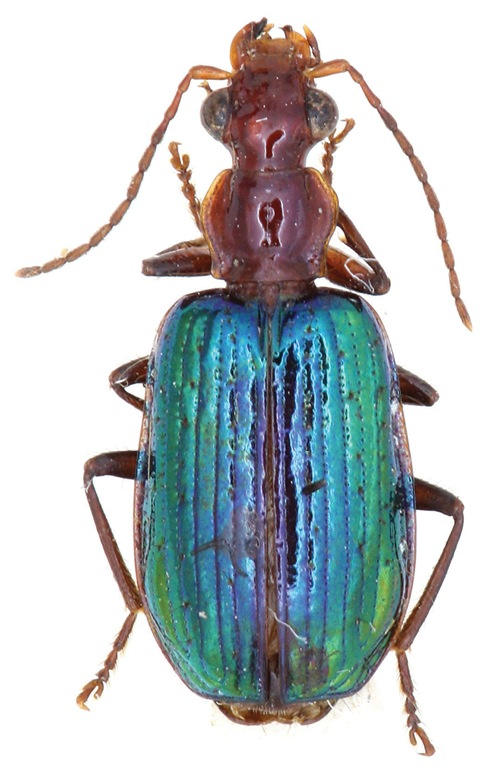
- Allocota viridipennis

Scientific classification
- Kingdom: Animalia
- Phylum: Arthropoda
- Class: Insecta
- Order: Coleoptera
- Suborder: Adephaga
- Family: Carabidae
- Subfamily: Lebiinae
- Tribe: Lebiini
- Subtribe: Physoderina
- Genus: Allocota; Motschulsky, 1859
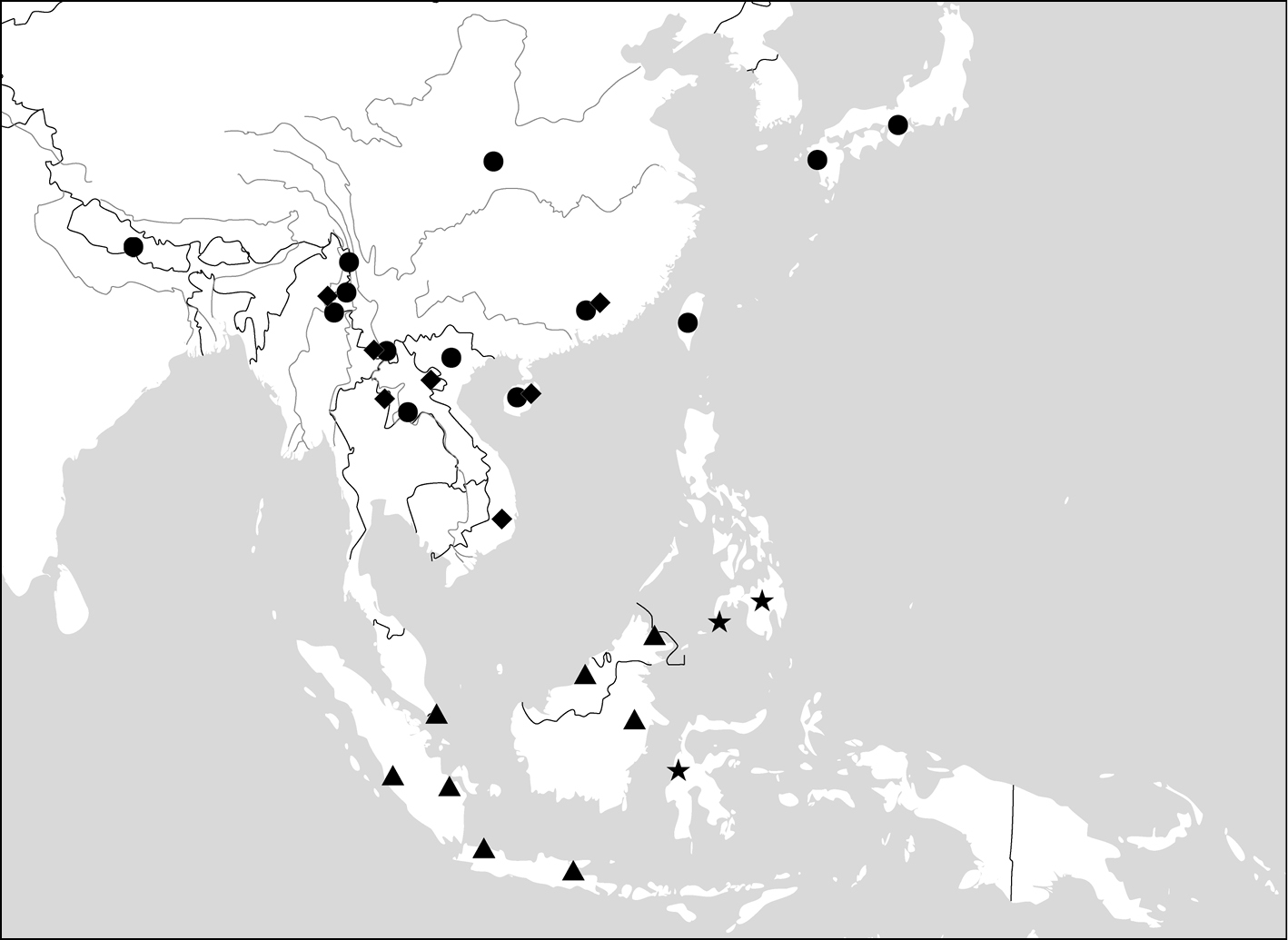
- ● Allocota aurata ★ Allocota cyanipennis ▲ Allocota viridipennis ◆ Allocota bicolor

Synonyms
- Taicona Bates, 1873

= Allocota =

Genus of beetles

Allocota is a genus of beetles in the family Carabidae, containing the following species:

- Allocota aurata (Bates, 1873)
- Allocota bicolor Shi & Liang, 2013
- Allocota cyanipennis Heller, 1923
- Allocota viridipennis Motschulsky, 1859

The following species have become synonyms:

- Allocota andrewesi (Jedlicka, 1934): Synonym of Physodera andrewesi (Jedlicka, 1934)
- Allocota arrowi (Jedlicka, 1935): Synonym of Diamella arrowi (Jedlicka, 1935)
- Allocota caerulea Andrewes, 1933: Synonym of Allocota viridipennis Motschulsky, 1859
- Allocota perlaeta Kirschenhofer, 1994: Synonym of Metallanchista perlaeta (Kirschenhofer, 1994)
- Allocota perroti (Jedlicka, 1963): Synonym of Allocota aurata (Bates, 1873)
- Allocota philippinensis (Jedlicka, 1935): Synonym of Paraphaea philippinensis (Jedlicka, 1935)
