= Hyboderini =

Scientific classification
- Domain: Eukaryota
- Kingdom: Animalia
- Phylum: Arthropoda
- Class: Insecta
- Order: Coleoptera
- Suborder: Polyphaga
- Infraorder: Cucujiformia
- Family: Cerambycidae
- Subfamily: Cerambycinae
- Tribe: Hyboderini; Linsley, 1940

Tribe of beetles

Hyboderini is a tribe of beetles in the subfamily Cerambycinae, containing the following genera and species:

- Genus Hybodera
  - Hybodera debilis LeConte, 1874
  - Hybodera tuberculata LeConte, 1873
- Genus Lampropterus
  - Lampropterus cyanipennis (LeConte, 1873)
  - Lampropterus ruficollis (LeConte, 1873)
- Genus Megobrium
  - Megobrium edwardsi LeConte, 1873
- Genus Pachymerola
  - Pachymerola mariaeugeniae Noguera, 2005
  - Pachymerola ruficollis Giesbert, 1987
  - Pachymerola toledoi Chemsak & Noguera, 1997
  - Pachymerola vitticollis Bates, 1892
  - Pachymerola wappesi Giesbert, 1993
- Genus Pseudopilema
  - Pseudopilema hoppingi (Van Dyke, 1920)
