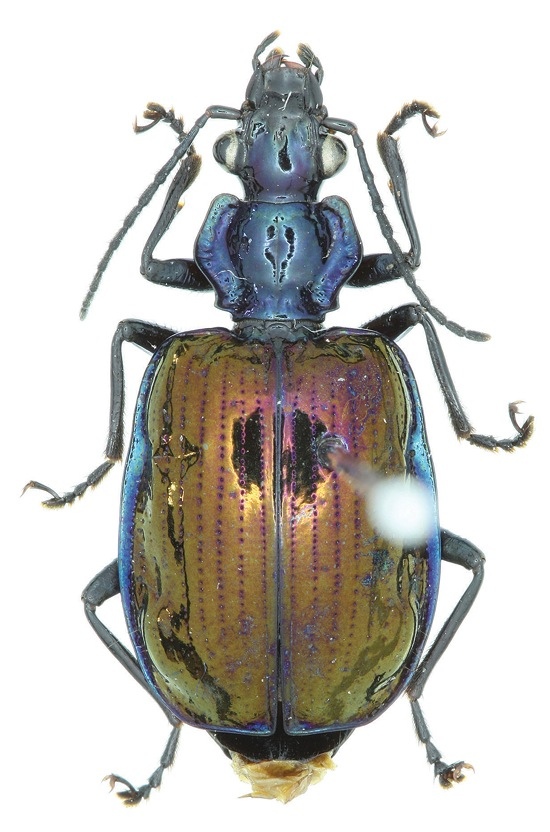
- Physodera eschscholtzii

Scientific classification
- Domain: Eukaryota
- Kingdom: Animalia
- Phylum: Arthropoda
- Class: Insecta
- Order: Coleoptera
- Suborder: Adephaga
- Family: Carabidae
- Tribe: Lebiini
- Genus: Physodera; Eschscholtz, 1829

= Physodera =

Genus of beetles

Physodera is a genus of beetles in the family Carabidae, found mainly in Asia.

== Species ==
These 13 species belong to the genus Physodera:

- Physodera amplicollis van de Poll, 1889 (Taiwan, Indonesia, Borneo, Philippines)
- Physodera andrewesi (Jedlicka, 1934) (Philippines)
- Physodera bacchusi Darlington, 1971 (New Guinea and Australia)
- Physodera bifenestrata Heller, 1923 (Indonesia and Borneo)
- Physodera bousqueti Mateu, 1990 (Nepal)
- Physodera chalceres Andrewes, 1930 (Malaysia, Indonesia, and Borneo)
- Physodera cyanipennis van de Poll, 1889 (Indonesia and New Guinea)
- Physodera dejeani Eschscholtz, 1829 (Indomalaya)
- Physodera diglenus Andrewes, 1930 (Malaysia and Indonesia)
- Physodera eburata Heller, 1923 (Philippines)
- Physodera eschscholtzii Parry, 1849 (China, Taiwan, Indomalaya)
- Physodera sciakyi Ma; Shi & Liang, 2017 (Indonesia)
- Physodera unicolor Ma; Shi & Liang, 2017 (China)

The following species have become synonyms:

- Physodera cupreomicans (Oberthur, 1883): Synonym of Diamella cupreomicans (Oberthur, 1883)

== Description ==
Members of this genus usually have wide mandibles, exhibit forelegs with a well developed cleaning spur, and lack the primary mid-lateral setae on the pronotum. The wing cases are short and broad. The prothorax is nearly globular with a raised tergum.
