= Pachymerola mariaeugeniae =

Scientific classification
- Kingdom: Animalia
- Phylum: Arthropoda
- Class: Insecta
- Order: Coleoptera
- Suborder: Polyphaga
- Infraorder: Cucujiformia
- Family: Cerambycidae
- Genus: Pachymerola
- Species: P. mariaeugeniae

Binomial name
- Pachymerola mariaeugeniae Noguera, 2005

Species of beetle

Pachymerola mariaeugeniae is a species of beetle in the family Cerambycidae. It was described by Noguera in 2005.
