= Bacchisa cavernifera =

Scientific classification
- Kingdom: Animalia
- Phylum: Arthropoda
- Clade: Pancrustacea
- Class: Insecta
- Order: Coleoptera
- Suborder: Polyphaga
- Infraorder: Cucujiformia
- Family: Cerambycidae
- Genus: Bacchisa
- Species: B. cavernifera

Binomial name
- Bacchisa cavernifera (Aurivillius, 1922)

Synonyms
- Chreonoma cavernifera Aurivillius, 1922

Species of beetle

Bacchisa cavernifera is a species of beetle in the family Cerambycidae. It was described by Per Olof Christopher Aurivillius in 1922 and is known from Java, Sumatra, and the Philippines.
