= Bacchisa medioviolacea =

Scientific classification
- Kingdom: Animalia
- Phylum: Arthropoda
- Class: Insecta
- Order: Coleoptera
- Suborder: Polyphaga
- Infraorder: Cucujiformia
- Family: Cerambycidae
- Genus: Bacchisa
- Species: B. medioviolacea

Binomial name
- Bacchisa medioviolacea Breuning, 1965

Species of beetle

Bacchisa medioviolacea is a species of beetle in the family Cerambycidae. It was described by Breuning in 1965. It is known from Laos.
