= Bacchisa parvula =

Scientific classification
- Domain: Eukaryota
- Kingdom: Animalia
- Phylum: Arthropoda
- Class: Insecta
- Order: Coleoptera
- Suborder: Polyphaga
- Infraorder: Cucujiformia
- Family: Cerambycidae
- Genus: Bacchisa
- Species: B. parvula

Binomial name
- Bacchisa parvula (Schwarzer, 1926)

Synonyms
- Chreonoma parvula Schwarzer, 1926

Species of beetle

Bacchisa parvula is a species of beetle in the family Cerambycidae. It was described by Schwarzer in 1926. It is known from Sumatra.
