= Bacchisa pallidiventris =

Scientific classification
- Domain: Eukaryota
- Kingdom: Animalia
- Phylum: Arthropoda
- Class: Insecta
- Order: Coleoptera
- Suborder: Polyphaga
- Infraorder: Cucujiformia
- Family: Cerambycidae
- Genus: Bacchisa
- Species: B. pallidiventris

Binomial name
- Bacchisa pallidiventris (Thomson, 1865)

Synonyms
- Astathes aegrota Thomson, 1865; Astathes pallidiventris Thomson, 1865; Chreonoma pallidicolor Pic, 1916

Species of beetle

Bacchisa pallidiventris is a species of beetle in the family Cerambycidae. It was described by Thomson in 1865. It is known from China, Laos and Vietnam.
