= Bacchisa dioica =

Scientific classification
- Kingdom: Animalia
- Phylum: Arthropoda
- Class: Insecta
- Order: Coleoptera
- Suborder: Polyphaga
- Infraorder: Cucujiformia
- Family: Cerambycidae
- Genus: Bacchisa
- Species: B. dioica

Binomial name
- Bacchisa dioica (Fairmaire, 1878)

Synonyms
- Astathes dioica Fairmaire, 1878; Chreonoma dioica Gressitt, 1951

Species of beetle

Bacchisa dioica is a species of beetle in the family Cerambycidae. It was described by Léon Fairmaire in 1878. It is known from China.
