= Chrysaethe aurata =

Scientific classification
- Domain: Eukaryota
- Kingdom: Animalia
- Phylum: Arthropoda
- Class: Insecta
- Order: Coleoptera
- Suborder: Polyphaga
- Infraorder: Cucujiformia
- Family: Cerambycidae
- Genus: Chrysaethe
- Species: C. aurata

Binomial name
- Chrysaethe aurata (Bates, 1870)

Species of beetle

Chrysaethe aurata is a species of beetle in the family Cerambycidae. It was described by Bates in 1870.
