= Bacchisa fruhstorferi =

Scientific classification
- Kingdom: Animalia
- Phylum: Arthropoda
- Clade: Pancrustacea
- Class: Insecta
- Order: Coleoptera
- Suborder: Polyphaga
- Infraorder: Cucujiformia
- Family: Cerambycidae
- Genus: Bacchisa
- Species: B. fruhstorferi

Binomial name
- Bacchisa fruhstorferi Breuning, 1959

Species of beetle

Bacchisa fruhstorferi is a species of beetle in the family Cerambycidae. It was described by Breuning in 1959. It is known from Java. Karl Jordan, a German entomologist, gave the first report on this species in 1894. The characteristic coloring and markings of Bacchisa fruhstorferi are popular, and they vary substantially depending on the type' native habitat. The species occurs primarily in Southeast Asia, particularly in areas with numerous trees, where it is a wood-boring beetle which impacts biodiversity. Bacchisa fruhstorferi's life cycle and behavior are like those of other Cerambycidae organisms, including the larval stage, which digs into wood and aids in the rotting of dead trees.

== Description ==
The unusual coloring of Bacchisa fruhstorferi differs slightly according to its place of origin. In its native environment, the beetle's dark skin can serve as a camouflage against predators because of its arrangement of lighter patterns.

== Distribution and habitat ==
Southeast Asia is host to a great deal of this species, particularly countries like Indonesia, Malaysia, and Thailand. It inhabits woods which are tropical or subtropical, where it helps biologically to the decomposition of dead trees. The interior parts of rotting wood make up a larval nourishment for Bacchisa fruhstorferi, a wood-borer which helps in the nutrient cycle in woodland environments.

== Ecology and behavior ==
A larval stage, in which the larvae bore into wood, a pupal stage, in which they completed metamorphosis, and an adult stage comprised the lifecycle of Bacchisa fruhstorferi. In order to put down eggs, adults are frequently discovered on or close to their host plants. Upon developing, the larvae bore into the wood, in order to find food and shelter until they are fully grown.

== Taxonomy and naming ==
The entomologist and researcher Hans Fruhstorfer, who is renowned for his significant studies on Southeast Asia's fauna, received an award with the species' name. Bacchisa fruhstorferi belong to the subfamily Lamiinae, which consists of many different kinds of longhorn beetles, based on taxonomic grouping.
