= Ideratus beatus =

Scientific classification
- Domain: Eukaryota
- Kingdom: Animalia
- Phylum: Arthropoda
- Class: Insecta
- Order: Coleoptera
- Suborder: Polyphaga
- Infraorder: Cucujiformia
- Family: Cerambycidae
- Genus: Ideratus
- Species: I. beatus

Binomial name
- Ideratus beatus Martins, Galileo & Oliveira, 2011

Species of beetle

Ideratus beatus is a species of beetle in the family Cerambycidae. It was described by Martins, Galileo and Oliveira in 2011.
