= Bacchisa violaceoapicalis =

Scientific classification
- Kingdom: Animalia
- Phylum: Arthropoda
- Class: Insecta
- Order: Coleoptera
- Suborder: Polyphaga
- Infraorder: Cucujiformia
- Family: Cerambycidae
- Genus: Bacchisa
- Species: B. violaceoapicalis

Binomial name
- Bacchisa violaceoapicalis (Pic, 1923)

Synonyms
- Chreonoma violaceoapicalis Pic, 1923

Species of beetle

Bacchisa violaceoapicalis is a species of beetle in the family Cerambycidae. It was described by Pic in 1923. It is known from Vietnam.
