= Pachymerola wappesi =

Scientific classification
- Kingdom: Animalia
- Phylum: Arthropoda
- Class: Insecta
- Order: Coleoptera
- Suborder: Polyphaga
- Infraorder: Cucujiformia
- Family: Cerambycidae
- Genus: Pachymerola
- Species: P. wappesi

Binomial name
- Pachymerola wappesi Giesbert, 1993

Species of beetle

Pachymerola wappesi is a species of beetle in the family Cerambycidae. It was described by Giesbert in 1993.
