= Bacchisa aulica =

Scientific classification
- Kingdom: Animalia
- Phylum: Arthropoda
- Clade: Pancrustacea
- Class: Insecta
- Order: Coleoptera
- Suborder: Polyphaga
- Infraorder: Cucujiformia
- Family: Cerambycidae
- Genus: Bacchisa
- Species: B. aulica

Binomial name
- Bacchisa aulica (Pascoe, 1867)

Synonyms
- Cyanastus aulicus Pascoe, 1867

Species of beetle

Bacchisa aulica is a species of beetle in the family Cerambycidae. It was described by Francis Polkinghorne Pascoe in 1867. It is known from Sulawesi.

== Varietas ==
- Bacchisa aulica var. nigrodiscalis Breuning
- Bacchisa aulica var. simia (Pascoe, 1867)
