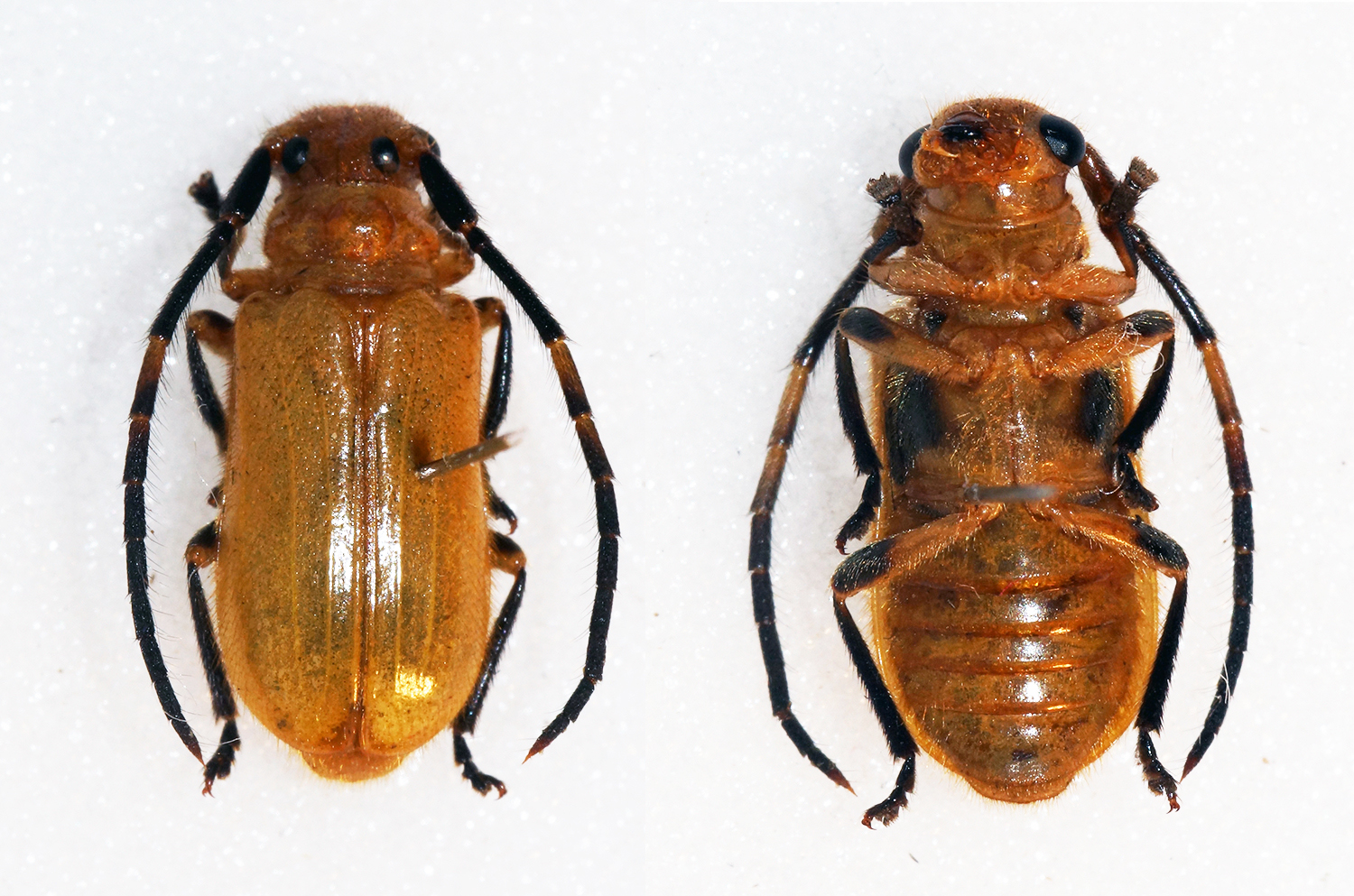
- Bacchisa chinensis

Scientific classification
- Domain: Eukaryota
- Kingdom: Animalia
- Phylum: Arthropoda
- Class: Insecta
- Order: Coleoptera
- Suborder: Polyphaga
- Infraorder: Cucujiformia
- Family: Cerambycidae
- Subfamily: Lamiinae
- Tribe: Astathini
- Genus: Bacchisa; Pascoe, 1867

= Bacchisa =

Genus of beetles

Bacchisa is a genus of longhorn beetles of the subfamily Lamiinae.

subgenus Atrobacchisa

- Bacchisa atrocoerulea (Gressitt, 1951)
- Bacchisa holorufa Breuning, 1968

subgenus Bacchisa

- Bacchisa albicornis (Pascoe, 1867)
- Bacchisa andamanensis Breuning, 1956
- Bacchisa annulicornis (Pascoe, 1867)
- Bacchisa argenteifrons (Gahan, 1907)
- Bacchisa assamensis Breuning, 1956
- Bacchisa atricornis Breuning, 1961
- Bacchisa atritarsis (Pic, 1912)
- Bacchisa aureosetosa Breuning, 1961
- Bacchisa basalis (Gahan, 1894)
- Bacchisa bicolor (Schwartz, 1931)
- Bacchisa bicoloripennis Breuning, 1968
- Bacchisa bimaculata (Pascoe, 1867)
- Bacchisa chinensis Breuning, 1948
- Bacchisa comata (Gahan, 1901)
- Bacchisa coronata Pascoe, 1866
- Bacchisa curticornis Breuning, 1956
- Bacchisa cyaneoapicalis (Gressitt, 1939)
- Bacchisa cyanicollis Breuning, 1956
- Bacchisa cyanipennis Breuning, 1961
- Bacchisa dapsilis (Newman, 1842)
- Bacchisa dilecta (Newman, 1842)
- Bacchisa dioica (Fairmaire, 1878)
- Bacchisa discoidalis (Thomson, 1865)
- Bacchisa flavescens Breuning, 1968
- Bacchisa flavicincta (Pascoe, 1867)
- Bacchisa flavobasalis Breuning, 1956
- Bacchisa fortunei (Thomson, 1857)
- Bacchisa frontalis (Gahan, 1895)
- Bacchisa fruhstorferi Breuning, 1959
- Bacchisa guerryi (Pic, 1911)
- Bacchisa hoffmanni (Gressitt, 1939)
- Bacchisa humeralis Breuning, 1956
- Bacchisa klapperichi Breuning, 1956
- Bacchisa kusamai Saito, 1999
- Bacchisa kweichowensis Breuning, 1959
- Bacchisa laevicollis Breuning, 1956
- Bacchisa medioviolacea Breuning, 1965
- Bacchisa melanura (Pascoe, 1867)
- Bacchisa mindanaonis Breuning, 1959
- Bacchisa nigricornis Breuning, 1969
- Bacchisa nigriventris (J. Thomson, 1865)
- Bacchisa nigroantennata Breuning, 1963
- Bacchisa nigroapicipennis Breuning, 1960
- Bacchisa nigrosternalis Breuning, 1956
- Bacchisa pallens (Chen, 1936)
- Bacchisa pallidiventris (Thomson, 1865)
- Bacchisa papuana Breuning, 1956
- Bacchisa partenigricornis Breuning, 1968
- Bacchisa parvula (Schwarzer, 1926)
- Bacchisa pennicillata (Aurivillius, 1927)
- Bacchisa perakensis Breuning, 1956
- Bacchisa pouangpethi Breuning, 1963
- Bacchisa pseudobasalis Breuning, 1956
- Bacchisa punctata (Thomson, 1865)
- Bacchisa rigida (Gressitt, 1942)
- Bacchisa seclusa (Pascoe, 1867)
- Bacchisa siamensis Breuning, 1959
- Bacchisa subannulicornis Breuning, 1964
- Bacchisa subbasalis Breuning, 1956
- Bacchisa subpallidiventris Breuning, 1968
- Bacchisa sumatrensis Breuning, 1950
- Bacchisa testacea (J. Thomson, 1857)
- Bacchisa tonkinensis Breuning, 1956
- Bacchisa transversefasciata Breuning, 1960
- Bacchisa unicolor Breuning, 1956
- Bacchisa venusta (Pascoe, 1867)
- Bacchisa vernula (Pascoe, 1867)
- Bacchisa violacea (Aurivillius, 1923)
- Bacchisa violaceoapicalis (Pic, 1923)

subgenus Bulbobacchisa

- Bacchisa cavernifera (Aurivillius, 1922)

subgenus Cyanastus

- Bacchisa aulica (Pascoe, 1867)
- Bacchisa borneotica Breuning, 1956
- Bacchisa gigantea Breuning, 1959
- Bacchisa kraatzii (Thomson, 1865)
- Bacchisa puncticollis (Thomson, 1865)
- Bacchisa unicoloripennis Breuning, 1964

subgenus Fasciatobacchisa

- Bacchisa fasciata (Schwarzer, 1931)
