= Bacchisa testacea =

Scientific classification
- Kingdom: Animalia
- Phylum: Arthropoda
- Clade: Pancrustacea
- Class: Insecta
- Order: Coleoptera
- Suborder: Polyphaga
- Infraorder: Cucujiformia
- Family: Cerambycidae
- Genus: Bacchisa
- Species: B. testacea

Binomial name
- Bacchisa testacea (J. Thomson, 1857)

Synonyms
- Chreonoma seminuda Fisher, 1935; Tetraophthalmus testaceus J. Thomson, 1857

Species of beetle

Bacchisa testacea is a species of beetle in the family Cerambycidae. It was described by J. Thomson in 1857. It is known from Borneo and Java.
