= Bacchisa dilecta =

Scientific classification
- Domain: Eukaryota
- Kingdom: Animalia
- Phylum: Arthropoda
- Class: Insecta
- Order: Coleoptera
- Suborder: Polyphaga
- Infraorder: Cucujiformia
- Family: Cerambycidae
- Genus: Bacchisa
- Species: B. dilecta

Binomial name
- Bacchisa dilecta (Newman, 1842)

Synonyms
- Phæa dilecta Newman, 1842

Species of beetle

Bacchisa dilecta is a species of beetle in the family Cerambycidae. It was described by Newman in 1842. It is known from the Philippines.
