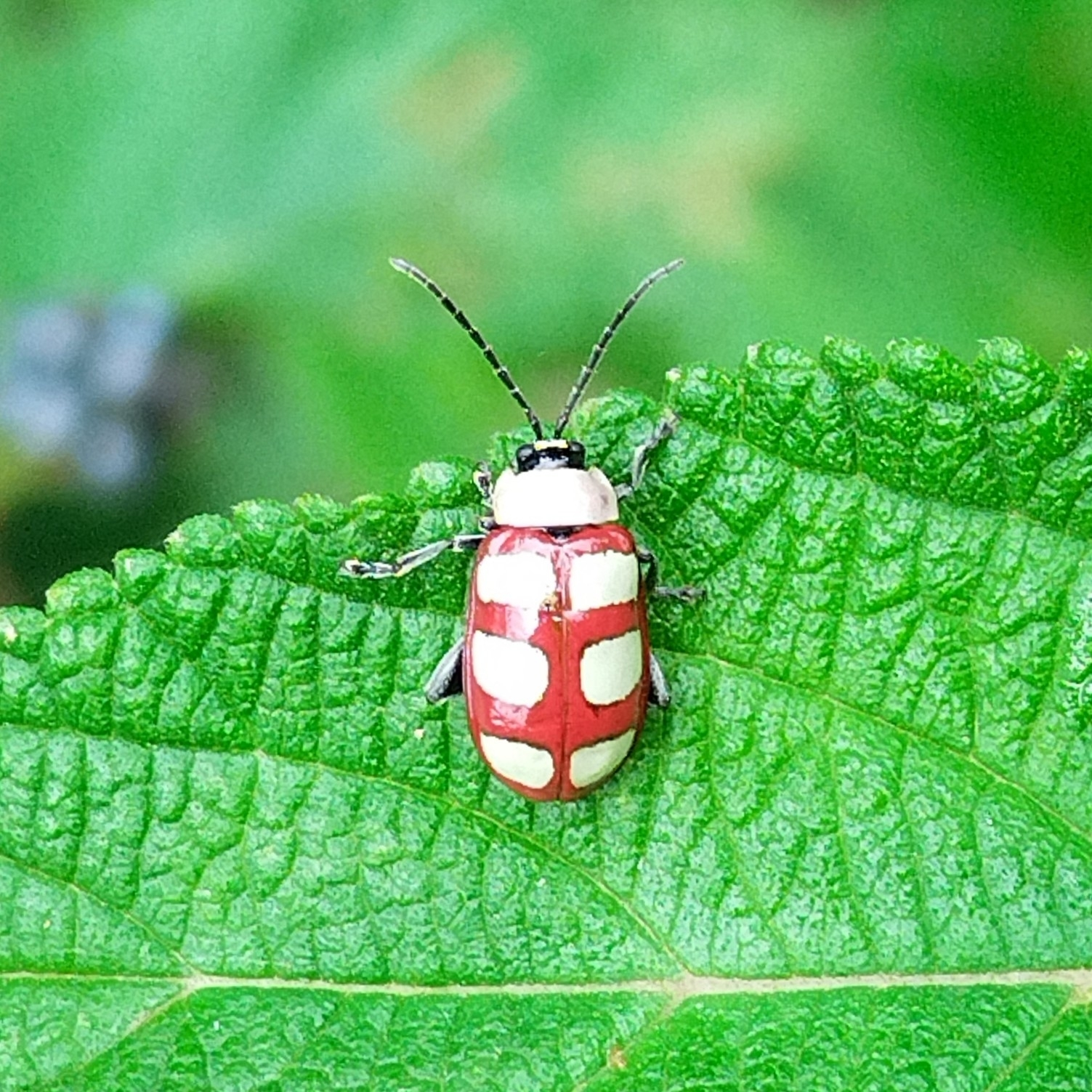
- adult from Bolivia

Scientific classification
- Kingdom: Animalia
- Phylum: Arthropoda
- Class: Insecta
- Order: Coleoptera
- Suborder: Polyphaga
- Infraorder: Cucujiformia
- Family: Chrysomelidae
- Genus: Omophoita
- Species: O. personata

Binomial name
- Omophoita personata (Illiger, 1807)

Synonyms
- Haltica personata Illiger, 1807

= Omophoita personata =

Species of beetle

Omophoita personata is a species of flea beetle in the family Chrysomelidae and tribe Alticini. Originally described by Illiger in 1807 as Haltica personata, this species belongs to the subtribe Oedionychina.

== Distribution ==
O. personata is distributed in South America, with records from Brazil, including the southern states of Paraná, Santa Catarina, and Rio Grande do Sul. The species has also been recorded from the Bahia region in Brazil.

== Habitat and ecology ==
Adult beetles have been found feeding on Ocimum carnosum (Lamiaceae), which serves as a host plant for both feeding and reproduction. The species inhabits various environments within the Neotropical region and is known to occur in forested areas.

== Description ==
Based on the original description by Illiger, Omophoita personata is one of the larger species in the genus, measuring over three lines long and nearly round in shape. The species exhibits the typical characteristics of the Oedionychina subtribe, including smooth or confusedly punctuated elytra and well-developed hind legs with globose apical metatarsomeres. The original description noted distinctive coloration with a cream-colored head shield that is narrower than the wing covers, and the front corners are curved outward.

The immature stages of O. personata have been described in detail by Antonio et al. (2022). Larvae have their bodies covered with tubercles and lack stemmata (simple eyes), characteristics shared with other Oedionychina species. The larval development includes three instars, with the species completing its development on its host plant. Third-instar larvae measure approximately 8-10 mm in length and display the characteristic tuberculate body surface typical of Oedionychina larvae.

== Taxonomy ==
Omophoita personata belongs to the genus Omophoita, which contains approximately 134 species distributed mainly in Central and South America. The genus is part of the subtribe Oedionychina, which is considered monophyletic and includes more than 600 species in 23 genera distributed in the New World.
