= Bacchisa melanura =

Scientific classification
- Domain: Eukaryota
- Kingdom: Animalia
- Phylum: Arthropoda
- Class: Insecta
- Order: Coleoptera
- Suborder: Polyphaga
- Infraorder: Cucujiformia
- Family: Cerambycidae
- Genus: Bacchisa
- Species: B. melanura

Binomial name
- Bacchisa melanura (Pascoe, 1867)

Synonyms
- Chreonoma melanura Pascoe, 1867

Species of beetle

Bacchisa melanura is a species of beetle in the family Cerambycidae. It was described by Pascoe in 1867. It is known from Malaysia and Singapore.
