= Bacchisa andamanensis =

Scientific classification
- Kingdom: Animalia
- Phylum: Arthropoda
- Class: Insecta
- Order: Coleoptera
- Suborder: Polyphaga
- Infraorder: Cucujiformia
- Family: Cerambycidae
- Genus: Bacchisa
- Species: B. andamanensis

Binomial name
- Bacchisa andamanensis Breuning, 1956

Species of beetle

Bacchisa andamanensis is a species of beetle in the family Cerambycidae. It was described by Breuning in 1956. It is known to live on the Andaman Islands.
