= Bacchisa atritarsis =

Scientific classification
- Kingdom: Animalia
- Phylum: Arthropoda
- Class: Insecta
- Order: Coleoptera
- Suborder: Polyphaga
- Infraorder: Cucujiformia
- Family: Cerambycidae
- Genus: Bacchisa
- Species: B. atritarsis

Binomial name
- Bacchisa atritarsis (Pic, 1912)

Synonyms
- Chreonoma atritarsis Pic, 1912

Species of beetle

Bacchisa atritarsis is a species of beetle in the family Cerambycidae. It was described by Maurice Pic in 1912. It is known from China.
