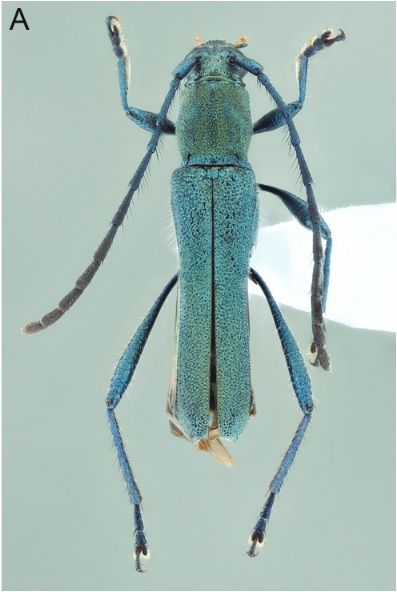

Scientific classification
- Kingdom: Animalia
- Phylum: Arthropoda
- Clade: Pancrustacea
- Class: Insecta
- Order: Coleoptera
- Suborder: Polyphaga
- Infraorder: Cucujiformia
- Family: Cerambycidae
- Genus: Chrysaethe
- Species: C. asperiventris

Binomial name
- Chrysaethe asperiventris (Bates, 1872)

Synonyms
- Ommata asperiventris Bates, 1872

= Chrysaethe asperiventris =

Species of beetle

Chrysaethe asperiventris is a species of beetle in the family Cerambycidae. It was described by Bates in 1872. It is found in Brazil (Bahia, Minas Gerais, Espirito Santo, Rio de Janeiro, São Paulo, Paraná, Santa Catarina, Rio Grande do Sul).
