= Bacchisa fortunei =

Scientific classification
- Domain: Eukaryota
- Kingdom: Animalia
- Phylum: Arthropoda
- Class: Insecta
- Order: Coleoptera
- Suborder: Polyphaga
- Infraorder: Cucujiformia
- Family: Cerambycidae
- Genus: Bacchisa
- Species: B. fortunei

Binomial name
- Bacchisa fortunei (Thomson, 1857)

Synonyms
- Chreonoma fortunei (Thomson) Lacordaire, 1872; Plaxomicrus fortunei Thomson, 1857

Species of beetle

Bacchisa fortunei, or the blue pear twig borer, is a species of beetle in the family Cerambycidae. It was described by Thomson in 1857. It is known from Japan.

== Subspecies ==
- Bacchisa fortunei flavicornis (Kono, 1933)
- Bacchisa fortunei fortunei (Thomson, 1857)
- Bacchisa fortunei japonica (Gahan, 1901)
