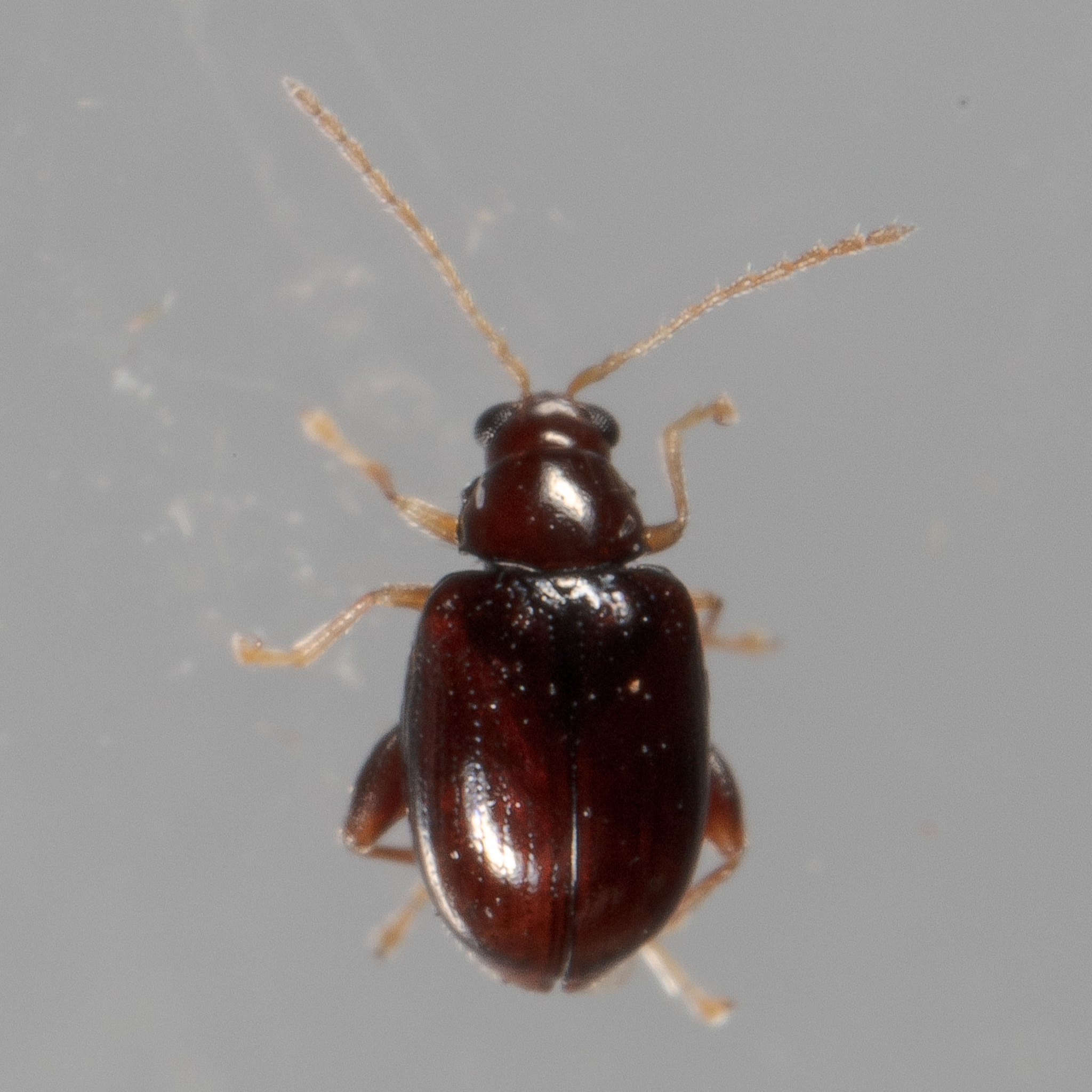

Scientific classification
- Kingdom: Animalia
- Phylum: Arthropoda
- Clade: Pancrustacea
- Class: Insecta
- Order: Coleoptera
- Suborder: Polyphaga
- Infraorder: Cucujiformia
- Family: Chrysomelidae
- Tribe: Alticini
- Genus: Glyptina
- Species: G. brunnea

Binomial name
- Glyptina brunnea Horn, 1889

= Glyptina brunnea =

Species of beetle

Glyptina brunnea is a species of flea beetle in the family Chrysomelidae. It is found in North America.
