= Bacchisa siamensis =

Scientific classification
- Kingdom: Animalia
- Phylum: Arthropoda
- Class: Insecta
- Order: Coleoptera
- Suborder: Polyphaga
- Infraorder: Cucujiformia
- Family: Cerambycidae
- Genus: Bacchisa
- Species: B. siamensis

Binomial name
- Bacchisa siamensis Breuning, 1959

Species of beetle

Bacchisa siamensis is a species of beetle in the family Cerambycidae. It was described by Breuning in 1959. It is known from Thailand.
