= Bacchisa comata =

Scientific classification
- Domain: Eukaryota
- Kingdom: Animalia
- Phylum: Arthropoda
- Class: Insecta
- Order: Coleoptera
- Suborder: Polyphaga
- Infraorder: Cucujiformia
- Family: Cerambycidae
- Genus: Bacchisa
- Species: B. comata

Binomial name
- Bacchisa comata (Gahan, 1901)

Synonyms
- Chreonoma comata Gahan, 1901

Species of beetle

Bacchisa comata is a species of beetle in the family Cerambycidae. It was described by Gahan in 1901. It is known from China and Hong Kong.
