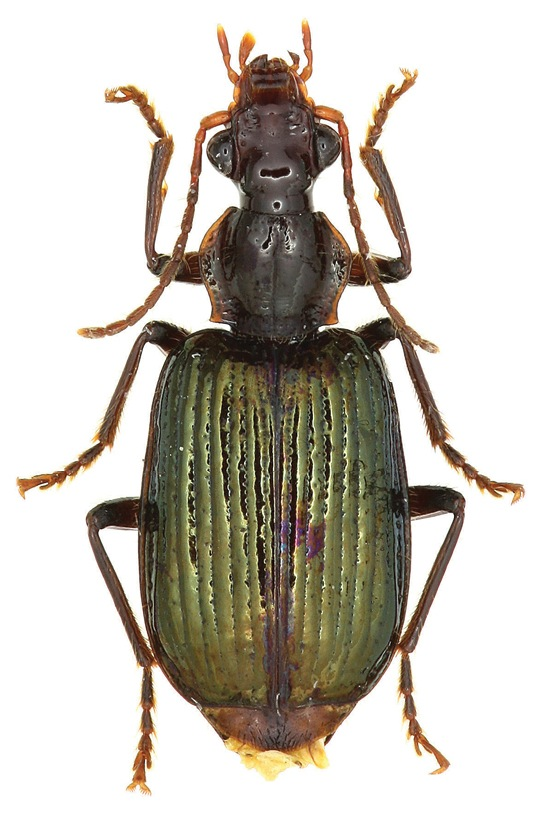
- Diamella cupreomicans

Scientific classification
- Domain: Eukaryota
- Kingdom: Animalia
- Phylum: Arthropoda
- Class: Insecta
- Order: Coleoptera
- Suborder: Adephaga
- Family: Carabidae
- Subfamily: Lebiinae
- Tribe: Lebiini
- Subtribe: Physoderina
- Genus: Diamella; Jedlicka, 1952

Type species
- Diamella kaszabi Jedlička, 1952

Species
- See text

= Diamella =

Genus of beetles

Diamella is a genus of beetle in the family Carabidae. It was originally described by Arnošt Jedlička in 1952 as Dianella. Hongliang Shi, Hongzhang Zhou, and Hongbin Liang proposed Diamella as a replacement name in 2013, since Jedlička's Dianella was a junior homonym of the gastropod genus Dianella, described by Gerard Pierre Laurent Kalshoven Gude in 1913.

Originally monotypic, Diamella now contains five species in total:

- Diamella arrowi Jedlicka, 1952
- Diamella barsevskisi Anichtchenko, 2016
- Diamella cupreomicans Oberthür, 1883
- Diamella kaszabi Jedlicka, 1952
- Diamella singularis Anichtchenko, 2017
