= Bacchisa atrocoerulea =

Scientific classification
- Domain: Eukaryota
- Kingdom: Animalia
- Phylum: Arthropoda
- Class: Insecta
- Order: Coleoptera
- Suborder: Polyphaga
- Infraorder: Cucujiformia
- Family: Cerambycidae
- Genus: Bacchisa
- Species: B. atrocoerulea

Binomial name
- Bacchisa atrocoerulea (Gressitt, 1951)

Synonyms
- Chreonoma atrocoerulea Gressitt, 1951

Species of beetle

Bacchisa atrocoerulea is a species of beetle in the family Cerambycidae. It was described by Gressitt in 1951. It is known from Taiwan.
