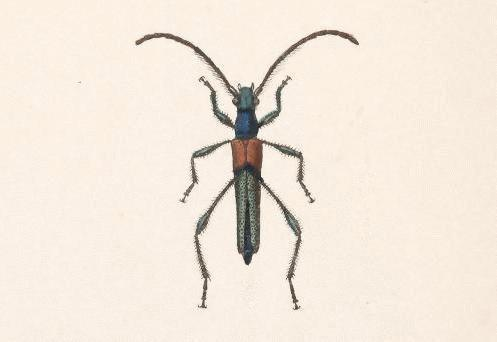

Scientific classification
- Domain: Eukaryota
- Kingdom: Animalia
- Phylum: Arthropoda
- Class: Insecta
- Order: Coleoptera
- Suborder: Polyphaga
- Infraorder: Cucujiformia
- Family: Cerambycidae
- Genus: Chrysaethe
- Species: C. beltiana

Binomial name
- Chrysaethe beltiana (Bates, 1872)

= Chrysaethe beltiana =

Species of beetle

Chrysaethe beltiana is a species of beetle in the family Cerambycidae. It was described by Bates in 1872.
