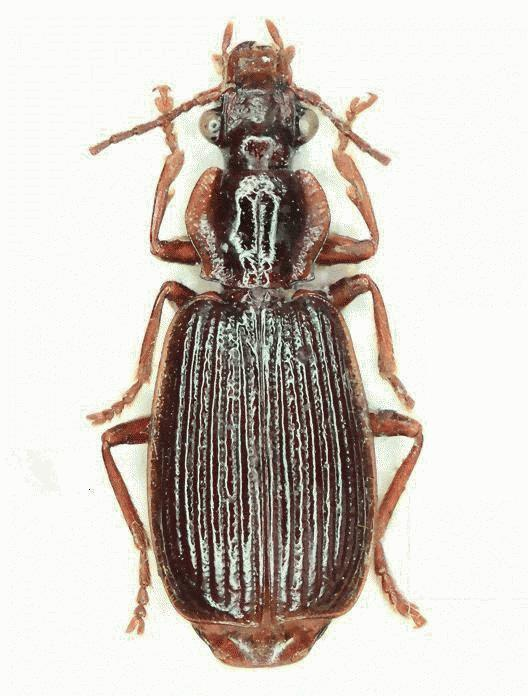

Scientific classification
- Kingdom: Animalia
- Phylum: Arthropoda
- Class: Insecta
- Order: Coleoptera
- Suborder: Adephaga
- Family: Carabidae
- Genus: Diamella
- Species: D. kaszabi

Binomial name
- Diamella kaszabi (Jedlička, 1952

= Diamella kaszabi =

Species of beetle

Diamella kaszabi is a species of ground beetle in the Lebiinae subfamily that is endemic to the Taiwan (Formosa). The species is black coloured with brown legs and is 8.1 millimetres (0.32 in) in length.
