= Chrysaethe globulicollis =

Scientific classification
- Kingdom: Animalia
- Phylum: Arthropoda
- Class: Insecta
- Order: Coleoptera
- Suborder: Polyphaga
- Infraorder: Cucujiformia
- Family: Cerambycidae
- Genus: Chrysaethe
- Species: C. globulicollis

Binomial name
- Chrysaethe globulicollis (Melzer, 1935)

Species of beetle

Chrysaethe globulicollis is a species of beetle in the family Cerambycidae. It was described by Melzer in 1935.
