= Bacchisa frontalis =

Scientific classification
- Domain: Eukaryota
- Kingdom: Animalia
- Phylum: Arthropoda
- Class: Insecta
- Order: Coleoptera
- Suborder: Polyphaga
- Infraorder: Cucujiformia
- Family: Cerambycidae
- Genus: Bacchisa
- Species: B. frontalis

Binomial name
- Bacchisa frontalis (Gahan, 1895)

Species of beetle

Bacchisa frontalis is a species of beetle in the family Cerambycidae. It was described by Gahan in 1895. It is known from Myanmar.
