= Bacchisa albicornis =

Scientific classification
- Domain: Eukaryota
- Kingdom: Animalia
- Phylum: Arthropoda
- Class: Insecta
- Order: Coleoptera
- Suborder: Polyphaga
- Infraorder: Cucujiformia
- Family: Cerambycidae
- Genus: Bacchisa
- Species: B. albicornis

Binomial name
- Bacchisa albicornis (Pascoe, 1867)

Synonyms
- Chreonoma albicornis Pascoe, 1867

Species of beetle

Bacchisa albicornis is a species of beetle in the family Cerambycidae. It was described by Pascoe in 1867. It is known from Singapore.
