= Glyptina =

Scientific classification
- Kingdom: Animalia
- Phylum: Arthropoda
- Class: Insecta
- Order: Coleoptera
- Suborder: Polyphaga
- Infraorder: Cucujiformia
- Family: Chrysomelidae
- Tribe: Alticini
- Genus: Glyptina; J. L. LeConte, 1859

Genus of beetles

Glyptina is a genus of flea beetles in the family Chrysomelidae. There are about 15 described species in Glyptina.

== Species ==
- Glyptina abbreviata Gentner, 1924
- Glyptina arizonica Schaeffer, 1906
- Glyptina atriventris Horn, 1889
- Glyptina bicolor Horn, 1889
- Glyptina brunnea Horn, 1889
- Glyptina cerina (J. L. LeConte, 1857)
- Glyptina cyanipennis (Crotch, 1873)
- Glyptina ferruginea Blatchley, 1924
- Glyptina leptosoma Blatchley, 1924
- Glyptina maritima Fall, 1927
- Glyptina nivalis Horn, 1889
- Glyptina schaefferi (Blatchley, 1927)
- Glyptina socia (Horn, 1889)
- Glyptina spuria J. L. LeConte, 1859
- Glyptina texana (Crotch, 1873)
