= Bacchisa fasciata =

Scientific classification
- Domain: Eukaryota
- Kingdom: Animalia
- Phylum: Arthropoda
- Class: Insecta
- Order: Coleoptera
- Suborder: Polyphaga
- Infraorder: Cucujiformia
- Family: Cerambycidae
- Genus: Bacchisa
- Species: B. fasciata

Binomial name
- Bacchisa fasciata (Schwarzer, 1931)

Species of beetle

Bacchisa fasciata is a species of beetle in the family Cerambycidae. It was described by Schwarzer in 1931. It is known from the Philippines.
