= Paranitocris =

Scientific classification
- Kingdom: Animalia
- Phylum: Arthropoda
- Class: Insecta
- Order: Coleoptera
- Suborder: Polyphaga
- Infraorder: Cucujiformia
- Family: Cerambycidae
- Tribe: Saperdini
- Genus: Paranitocris

Genus of beetles

Paranitocris is a genus of longhorn beetles of the subfamily Lamiinae, containing the following species:

- Paranitocris cyanipennis Breuning, 1950
- Paranitocris luci Lepesme & Breuning, 1955
