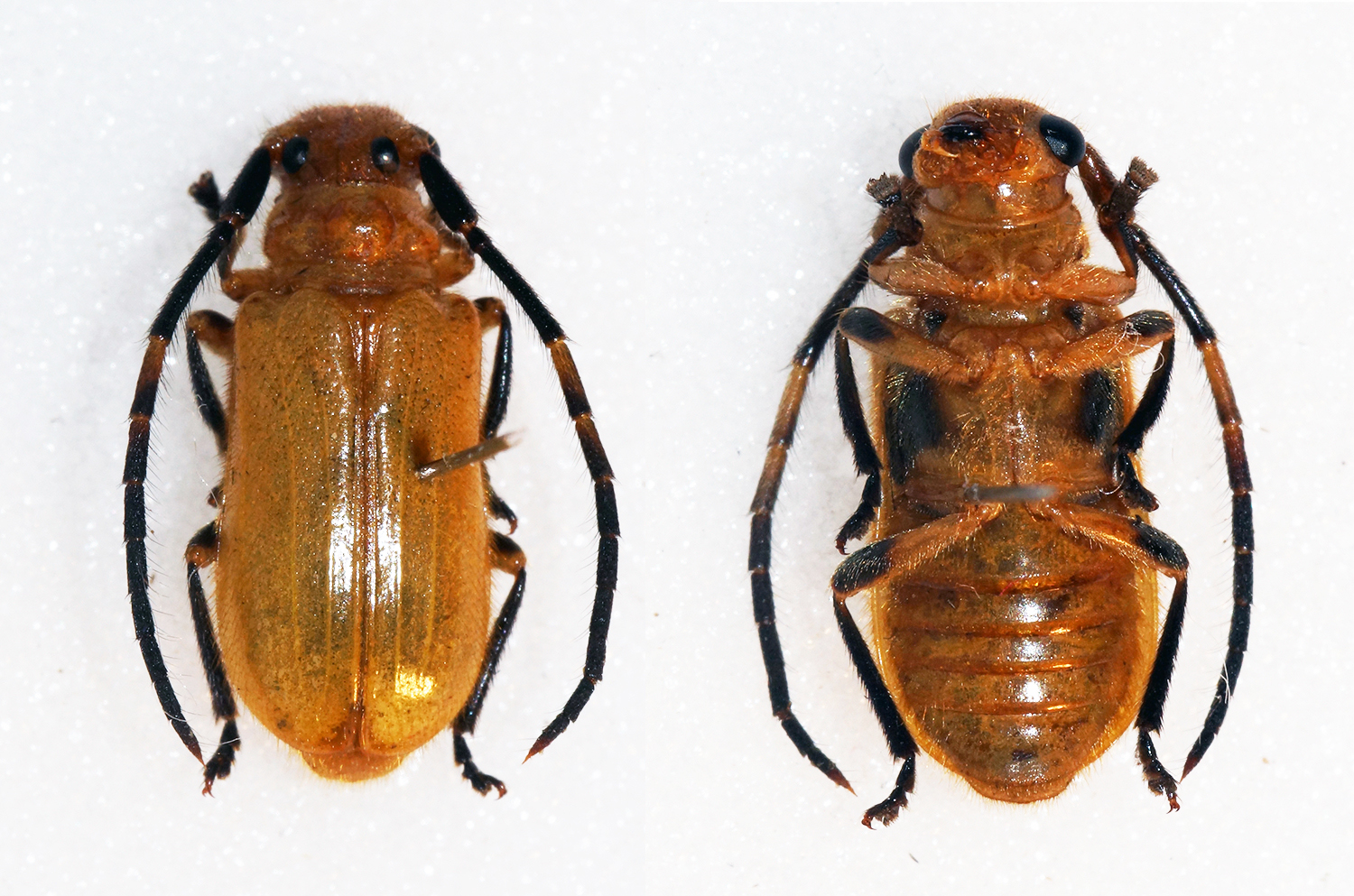

Scientific classification
- Kingdom: Animalia
- Phylum: Arthropoda
- Class: Insecta
- Order: Coleoptera
- Suborder: Polyphaga
- Infraorder: Cucujiformia
- Family: Cerambycidae
- Genus: Bacchisa
- Species: B. chinensis

Binomial name
- Bacchisa chinensis Breuning, 1948

= Bacchisa chinensis =

Species of beetle

Bacchisa chinensis is a species of beetle in the family Cerambycidae. It was described by Breuning in 1948. It is known from China.
