= Bacchisa bimaculata =

Scientific classification
- Domain: Eukaryota
- Kingdom: Animalia
- Phylum: Arthropoda
- Class: Insecta
- Order: Coleoptera
- Suborder: Polyphaga
- Infraorder: Cucujiformia
- Family: Cerambycidae
- Genus: Bacchisa
- Species: B. bimaculata

Binomial name
- Bacchisa bimaculata (Pascoe, 1867)

Synonyms
- Chreonoma bimaculata Pascoe, 1867

Species of beetle

Bacchisa bimaculata is a species of beetle in the family Cerambycidae. It was described by Pascoe in 1867.
