= Pachymerola vitticollis =

Scientific classification
- Kingdom: Animalia
- Phylum: Arthropoda
- Class: Insecta
- Order: Coleoptera
- Suborder: Polyphaga
- Infraorder: Cucujiformia
- Family: Cerambycidae
- Genus: Pachymerola
- Species: P. vitticollis

Binomial name
- Pachymerola vitticollis Bates, 1892

Species of beetle

Pachymerola vitticollis is a species of beetle in the family Cerambycidae. It was described by Bates in 1892.
