= Chrysaethe amboroensis =

Scientific classification
- Domain: Eukaryota
- Kingdom: Animalia
- Phylum: Arthropoda
- Class: Insecta
- Order: Coleoptera
- Suborder: Polyphaga
- Infraorder: Cucujiformia
- Family: Cerambycidae
- Genus: Chrysaethe
- Species: C. amboroensis

Binomial name
- Chrysaethe amboroensis Clarke, 2010

Species of beetle

Chrysaethe amboroensis is a species of beetle in the family Cerambycidae. It was described by Clarke in 2010.
