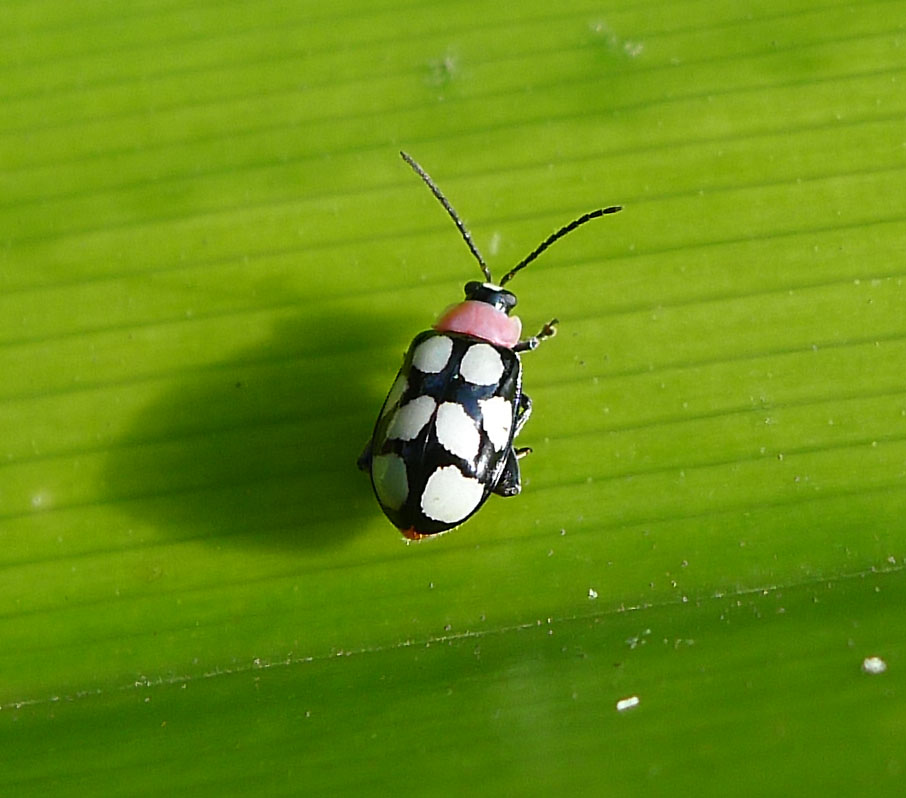
- Omophoita cyanipennis

Scientific classification
- Kingdom: Animalia
- Phylum: Arthropoda
- Class: Insecta
- Order: Coleoptera
- Suborder: Polyphaga
- Infraorder: Cucujiformia
- Superfamily: Chrysomeloidea
- Family: Chrysomelidae
- Subfamily: Galerucinae
- Tribe: Alticini
- Genus: Omophoita; Chevrolat in Dejean, 1836

Synonyms
- Ptena Chevrolat, 1836; Homophoeta Erichson, 1847 (Emend.); Homophoita Weise, 1921 (Missp.); Longasphaera Bechyné, 1955

= Omophoita =

Genus of beetles

Omophoita is a genus of flea beetles in the family Chrysomelidae. There are some 50 described species in North America and the Neotropics.

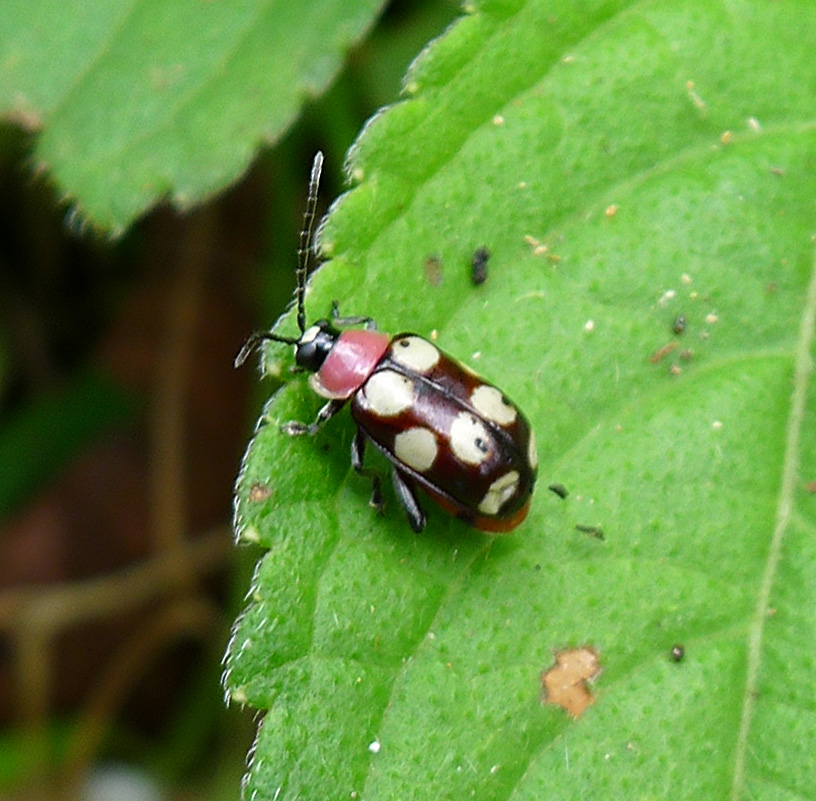
Omophoita cyanipennis

== Selected species ==
- Omophoita aequinoctialis (Linnaeus, 1758)
- Omophoita albicollis (Fabricius, 1787)
- Omophoita blakeae Bechyné, 1958
- Omophoita clerica (Erichson, 1848)
- Omophoita cyanipennis (Fabricius, 1798) (eight-spotted flea beetle)
- Omophoita episcopalis
- Omophoita ernesta Bechyne
- Omophoita fulgida (Olivier, 1807)
- Omophoita ophthalmicus
- Omophoita osunai
- Omophoita personata (Illiger, 1807)
- Omophoita peruviana
- Omophoita quadrinotata (Fabricius, 1798)
- Omophoita stenodera Bechyné, 1958
- Omophoita succincta
