= Bacchisa kraatzii =

Scientific classification
- Kingdom: Animalia
- Phylum: Arthropoda
- Clade: Pancrustacea
- Class: Insecta
- Order: Coleoptera
- Suborder: Polyphaga
- Infraorder: Cucujiformia
- Family: Cerambycidae
- Genus: Bacchisa
- Species: B. kraatzii

Binomial name
- Bacchisa kraatzii (Thomson, 1865)

Synonyms
- Astathes kraatzii Thomson, 1865; Bacchisa kraatzi (Thomson) Aurivillius, 1922 (misspelling)

Species of beetle

Bacchisa kraatzii is a species of beetle in the family Cerambycidae. It was described by Thomson in 1865. It is known from Java and the Philippines.

== Subspecies ==
- Bacchisa kraatzii kraatzii (Thomson, 1865)
- Bacchisa kraatzii pallida (Thomson, 1865)
