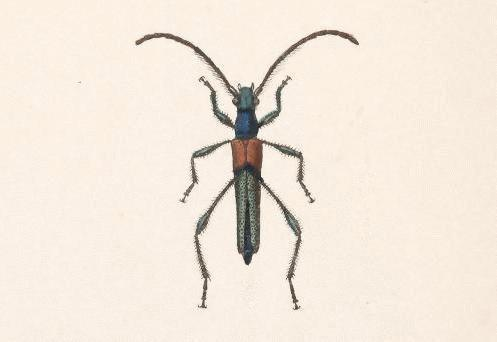
- Chrysaethe beltiana

Scientific classification
- Domain: Eukaryota
- Kingdom: Animalia
- Phylum: Arthropoda
- Class: Insecta
- Order: Coleoptera
- Suborder: Polyphaga
- Infraorder: Cucujiformia
- Family: Cerambycidae
- Subfamily: Cerambycinae
- Tribe: Rhinotragini
- Genus: Chrysaethe; Bates, 1873

= Chrysaethe =

Genus of beetles

Chrysaethe is a genus of beetles in the family Cerambycidae, containing the following species:

- Chrysaethe amboroensis Clarke, 2010
- Chrysaethe amoena (Gounelle, 1911)
- Chrysaethe asperiventris (Bates, 1872)
- Chrysaethe atrata (Bates, 1872)
- Chrysaethe atrocephala (Fisher, 1947)
- Chrysaethe aurantipennis (Giesbert, 1991)
- Chrysaethe aurata (Bates, 1870)
- Chrysaethe aureicollis (Aurivillius, 1920)
- Chrysaethe beltiana (Bates, 1872)
- Chrysaethe cyanipennis (Bates, 1872)
- Chrysaethe globulicollis (Melzer, 1935)
- Chrysaethe iodes (Bates, 1885)
- Chrysaethe jorgei (Tavakilian & Penaherrera-Leiva, 2003)
- Chrysaethe ochraceicollis (Zajciw, 1965)
- Chrysaethe smaragdina (Bates, 1870)
- Chrysaethe viriditincta (Giesbert, 1991)
