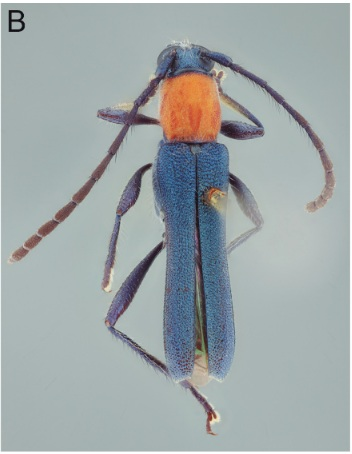

Scientific classification
- Kingdom: Animalia
- Phylum: Arthropoda
- Clade: Pancrustacea
- Class: Insecta
- Order: Coleoptera
- Suborder: Polyphaga
- Infraorder: Cucujiformia
- Family: Cerambycidae
- Genus: Chrysaethe
- Species: C. aureicollis

Binomial name
- Chrysaethe aureicollis (Aurivillius, 1920)

= Chrysaethe aureicollis =

Species of beetle

Chrysaethe aureicollis is a species of beetle in the family Cerambycidae. It was described by Per Olof Christopher Aurivillius in 1920.
