= Bacchisa sumatrensis =

Scientific classification
- Kingdom: Animalia
- Phylum: Arthropoda
- Class: Insecta
- Order: Coleoptera
- Suborder: Polyphaga
- Infraorder: Cucujiformia
- Family: Cerambycidae
- Genus: Bacchisa
- Species: B. sumatrensis

Binomial name
- Bacchisa sumatrensis Breuning, 1950

Species of beetle

Bacchisa sumatrensis is a species of beetle in the family Cerambycidae. It was described by Breuning in 1950. It is known from Sumatra.
