= Megobrium =

Scientific classification
- Kingdom: Animalia
- Phylum: Arthropoda
- Class: Insecta
- Order: Coleoptera
- Suborder: Polyphaga
- Infraorder: Cucujiformia
- Family: Cerambycidae
- Tribe: Hyboderini
- Genus: Megobrium; LeConte, 1873
- Species: M. edwardsii

Binomial name
- Megobrium edwardsii LeConte, 1873

Synonyms
- Megobrium edwardsi LeConte, 1873

Genus of beetles

Megobrium is a monotypic beetle genus in the family Cerambycidae. Its only species, Megobrium edwardsii, was described by John Lawrence LeConte in 1873. It is found in the US state of California.
