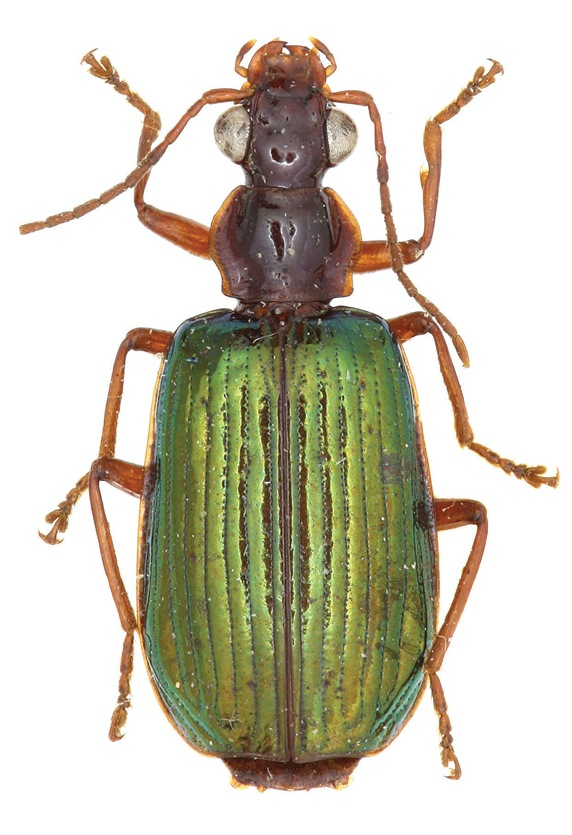

Scientific classification
- Domain: Eukaryota
- Kingdom: Animalia
- Phylum: Arthropoda
- Class: Insecta
- Order: Coleoptera
- Suborder: Adephaga
- Family: Carabidae
- Genus: Allocota
- Species: A. bicolor

Binomial name
- Allocota bicolor Shi & Liang, 2013

= Allocota bicolor =

Species of beetle

Allocota bicolor is a species of ground beetle in the Lebiinae subfamily that can be found in such Asian countries as China, Laos, Thailand and Viet Nam.

== Description ==
The species is reddish-blue coloured and is 7.5–8.7 millimetres (0.30–0.34 in) in length. Its head and pronotum is of orange red colour with yellowish brown mouthparts. Its palpomeres is of dark brown colour.
