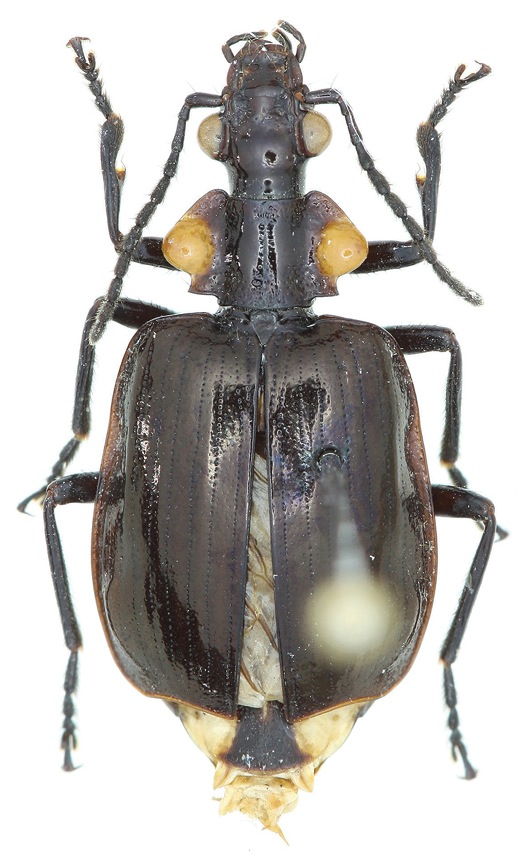

Scientific classification
- Kingdom: Animalia
- Phylum: Arthropoda
- Class: Insecta
- Order: Coleoptera
- Suborder: Adephaga
- Family: Carabidae
- Genus: Physodera
- Species: P. dejeani

Binomial name
- Physodera dejeani Eschscholtz, 1829

= Physodera dejeani =

Species of beetle

Physodera dejeani is a species of carabid beetle found in Southeast Asia.
