= Bacchisa argenteifrons =

Scientific classification
- Domain: Eukaryota
- Kingdom: Animalia
- Phylum: Arthropoda
- Class: Insecta
- Order: Coleoptera
- Suborder: Polyphaga
- Infraorder: Cucujiformia
- Family: Cerambycidae
- Genus: Bacchisa
- Species: B. argenteifrons

Binomial name
- Bacchisa argenteifrons (Gahan, 1907)

Species of beetle

Bacchisa argenteifrons is a species of beetle in the family Cerambycidae. It was described by Gahan in 1907. It is known from Malaysia.
