= Bacchisa discoidalis =

Scientific classification
- Domain: Eukaryota
- Kingdom: Animalia
- Phylum: Arthropoda
- Class: Insecta
- Order: Coleoptera
- Suborder: Polyphaga
- Infraorder: Cucujiformia
- Family: Cerambycidae
- Genus: Bacchisa
- Species: B. discoidalis

Binomial name
- Bacchisa discoidalis (Thomson, 1865)

Synonyms
- Astathes discoidalis Thomson, 1865

Species of beetle

Bacchisa discoidalis is a species of beetle in the family Cerambycidae. It was described by Thomson in 1865. It is known from Sumatra.
