= Glyptina texana =

Scientific classification
- Kingdom: Animalia
- Phylum: Arthropoda
- Class: Insecta
- Order: Coleoptera
- Suborder: Polyphaga
- Infraorder: Cucujiformia
- Family: Chrysomelidae
- Tribe: Alticini
- Genus: Glyptina
- Species: G. texana

Binomial name
- Glyptina texana (Crotch, 1873)

Species of beetle

Glyptina texana is a species of flea beetle in the family Chrysomelidae. It is found in North America.
