= Bacchisa cyaneoapicalis =

Scientific classification
- Domain: Eukaryota
- Kingdom: Animalia
- Phylum: Arthropoda
- Class: Insecta
- Order: Coleoptera
- Suborder: Polyphaga
- Infraorder: Cucujiformia
- Family: Cerambycidae
- Genus: Bacchisa
- Species: B. cyaneoapicalis

Binomial name
- Bacchisa cyaneoapicalis (Gressitt, 1939)

Species of beetle

Bacchisa cyaneoapicalis is a species of beetle in the family Cerambycidae. It was described by Gressitt in 1939. It is known from China.
