= Bacchisa violacea =

Scientific classification
- Kingdom: Animalia
- Phylum: Arthropoda
- Class: Insecta
- Order: Coleoptera
- Suborder: Polyphaga
- Infraorder: Cucujiformia
- Family: Cerambycidae
- Genus: Bacchisa
- Species: B. violacea

Binomial name
- Bacchisa violacea (Aurivillius, 1923)

Synonyms
- Chreonoma violacea Aurivillius, 1923

Species of beetle

Bacchisa violacea is a species of beetle in the family Cerambycidae. It was described by Per Olof Christopher Aurivillius in 1923 and is known from Borneo.
