= Chrysaethe aurantipennis =

Scientific classification
- Domain: Eukaryota
- Kingdom: Animalia
- Phylum: Arthropoda
- Class: Insecta
- Order: Coleoptera
- Suborder: Polyphaga
- Infraorder: Cucujiformia
- Family: Cerambycidae
- Genus: Chrysaethe
- Species: C. aurantipennis

Binomial name
- Chrysaethe aurantipennis (Giesbert, 1991)

Species of beetle

Chrysaethe aurantipennis is a species of beetle in the family Cerambycidae. It was described by Giesbert in 1991.
