= Bacchisa pallens =

Scientific classification
- Domain: Eukaryota
- Kingdom: Animalia
- Phylum: Arthropoda
- Class: Insecta
- Order: Coleoptera
- Suborder: Polyphaga
- Infraorder: Cucujiformia
- Family: Cerambycidae
- Genus: Bacchisa
- Species: B. pallens

Binomial name
- Bacchisa pallens (Chen, 1936)

Species of beetle

Bacchisa pallens is a species of beetle in the family Cerambycidae. It was described by S.-H. Chen in 1936. It is known from China.
