= Bacchisa cyanicollis =

Scientific classification
- Kingdom: Animalia
- Phylum: Arthropoda
- Class: Insecta
- Order: Coleoptera
- Suborder: Polyphaga
- Infraorder: Cucujiformia
- Family: Cerambycidae
- Genus: Bacchisa
- Species: B. cyanicollis

Binomial name
- Bacchisa cyanicollis Breuning, 1956

Species of beetle

Bacchisa cyanicollis is a species of beetle in the family Cerambycidae. It was described by Breuning in 1956. It is known from Borneo.
