= Ideratus sagdus =

Scientific classification
- Domain: Eukaryota
- Kingdom: Animalia
- Phylum: Arthropoda
- Class: Insecta
- Order: Coleoptera
- Suborder: Polyphaga
- Infraorder: Cucujiformia
- Family: Cerambycidae
- Genus: Ideratus
- Species: I. sagdus

Binomial name
- Ideratus sagdus (Monné & Martins, 1972)

Species of beetle

Ideratus sagdus is a species of beetle in the family Cerambycidae. It was described by Monné and Martins in 1972.
