= Bacchisa bicolor =

Scientific classification
- Domain: Eukaryota
- Kingdom: Animalia
- Phylum: Arthropoda
- Class: Insecta
- Order: Coleoptera
- Suborder: Polyphaga
- Infraorder: Cucujiformia
- Family: Cerambycidae
- Genus: Bacchisa
- Species: B. bicolor

Binomial name
- Bacchisa bicolor (Schwartz, 1931)

Species of beetle

Bacchisa bicolor is a species of beetle in the family Cerambycidae. It was described by Schwartz in 1931. It is known from the Philippines.
