= Hybodera debilis =

Scientific classification
- Kingdom: Animalia
- Phylum: Arthropoda
- Class: Insecta
- Order: Coleoptera
- Suborder: Polyphaga
- Infraorder: Cucujiformia
- Family: Cerambycidae
- Genus: Hybodera
- Species: H. debilis

Binomial name
- Hybodera debilis LeConte, 1874

Species of beetle

Hybodera debilis is a species of beetle in the family Cerambycidae. It was described by John Lawrence LeConte in 1874.
