= Glyptina spuria =

Scientific classification
- Kingdom: Animalia
- Phylum: Arthropoda
- Clade: Pancrustacea
- Class: Insecta
- Order: Coleoptera
- Suborder: Polyphaga
- Infraorder: Cucujiformia
- Family: Chrysomelidae
- Subfamily: Galerucinae
- Tribe: Alticini
- Genus: Glyptina
- Species: G. spuria

Binomial name
- Glyptina spuria J. L. LeConte, 1859

Species of beetle

Glyptina spuria is a species of flea beetle in the family Chrysomelidae. It is found in North America.
