= Bacchisa basalis =

Scientific classification
- Domain: Eukaryota
- Kingdom: Animalia
- Phylum: Arthropoda
- Class: Insecta
- Order: Coleoptera
- Suborder: Polyphaga
- Infraorder: Cucujiformia
- Family: Cerambycidae
- Genus: Bacchisa
- Species: B. basalis

Binomial name
- Bacchisa basalis (Gahan, 1894)

Synonyms
- Chreonoma basalis Gahan, 1894; Chreonoma tonkinea Pic, 1916

Species of beetle

Bacchisa basalis is a species of beetle in the family Cerambycidae. It was described by Gahan in 1894. It is known from China, Hong Kong and Vietnam.
