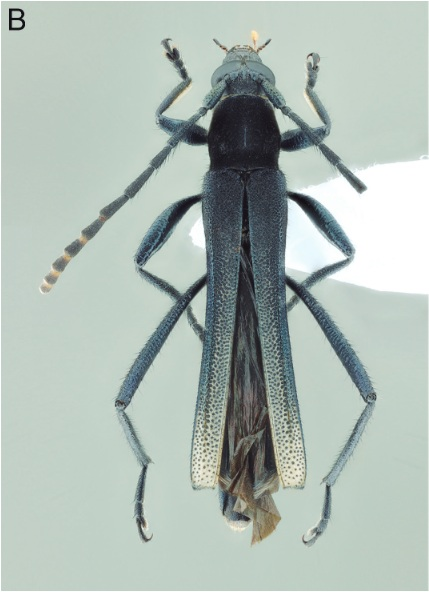

Scientific classification
- Kingdom: Animalia
- Phylum: Arthropoda
- Clade: Pancrustacea
- Class: Insecta
- Order: Coleoptera
- Suborder: Polyphaga
- Infraorder: Cucujiformia
- Family: Cerambycidae
- Genus: Chrysaethe
- Species: C. atrata

Binomial name
- Chrysaethe atrata (Bates, 1872)

Synonyms
- Ommata atrata Bates, 1872

= Chrysaethe atrata =

Species of beetle

Chrysaethe atrata is a species of beetle in the family Cerambycidae. It was described by Bates in 1872. It is found in Brazil (Bahia, Goiás, Minas Gerais, Espirito Santo, Rio de Janeiro, São Paulo, Paraná, Santa Catarina, Rio Grande do Sul).
