= Bacchisa kusamai =

Scientific classification
- Domain: Eukaryota
- Kingdom: Animalia
- Phylum: Arthropoda
- Class: Insecta
- Order: Coleoptera
- Suborder: Polyphaga
- Infraorder: Cucujiformia
- Family: Cerambycidae
- Genus: Bacchisa
- Species: B. kusamai

Binomial name
- Bacchisa kusamai Saito, 1999

Species of beetle

Bacchisa kusamai is a species of beetle in the family Cerambycidae. It was described by Saito in 1999. It is known from Vietnam.
