= Chrysaethe jorgei =

Scientific classification
- Domain: Eukaryota
- Kingdom: Animalia
- Phylum: Arthropoda
- Class: Insecta
- Order: Coleoptera
- Suborder: Polyphaga
- Infraorder: Cucujiformia
- Family: Cerambycidae
- Genus: Chrysaethe
- Species: C. jorgei

Binomial name
- Chrysaethe jorgei (Tavakilian & Penaherrera-Leiva, 2003)

Species of beetle

Chrysaethe jorgei is a species of beetle in the family Cerambycidae. It was described by Tavakilian and Penaherrera-Leiva in 2003.
