= Bacchisa unicoloripennis =

Scientific classification
- Kingdom: Animalia
- Phylum: Arthropoda
- Class: Insecta
- Order: Coleoptera
- Suborder: Polyphaga
- Infraorder: Cucujiformia
- Family: Cerambycidae
- Genus: Bacchisa
- Species: B. unicoloripennis

Binomial name
- Bacchisa unicoloripennis Breuning, 1964

Species of beetle

Bacchisa unicoloripennis is a species of beetle in the family Cerambycidae. It was described by Breuning in 1964. It is from Laos.
