= Ideratus virginiae =

Scientific classification
- Domain: Eukaryota
- Kingdom: Animalia
- Phylum: Arthropoda
- Class: Insecta
- Order: Coleoptera
- Suborder: Polyphaga
- Infraorder: Cucujiformia
- Family: Cerambycidae
- Genus: Ideratus
- Species: I. virginiae

Binomial name
- Ideratus virginiae (Dalens & Tavakilian, 2006)

Species of beetle

Ideratus virginiae is a species of beetle in the family Cerambycidae. It was described by Dalens and Tavakilian in 2006.
