= Bacchisa gigantea =

Scientific classification
- Kingdom: Animalia
- Phylum: Arthropoda
- Clade: Pancrustacea
- Class: Insecta
- Order: Coleoptera
- Suborder: Polyphaga
- Infraorder: Cucujiformia
- Family: Cerambycidae
- Genus: Bacchisa
- Species: B. gigantea

Binomial name
- Bacchisa gigantea Breuning, 1959

Species of beetle

Bacchisa gigantea is a species of beetle in the family Cerambycidae. It was described by Breuning in 1959. It is known from Java.
