= Bacchisa flavescens =

Scientific classification
- Kingdom: Animalia
- Phylum: Arthropoda
- Class: Insecta
- Order: Coleoptera
- Suborder: Polyphaga
- Infraorder: Cucujiformia
- Family: Cerambycidae
- Genus: Bacchisa
- Species: B. flavescens

Binomial name
- Bacchisa flavescens Breuning, 1968

Species of beetle

Bacchisa flavescens is a species of beetle in the family Cerambycidae. It was described by Breuning in 1968. It is known from Laos.
