= Bacchisa nigriventris =

Scientific classification
- Kingdom: Animalia
- Phylum: Arthropoda
- Class: Insecta
- Order: Coleoptera
- Suborder: Polyphaga
- Infraorder: Cucujiformia
- Family: Cerambycidae
- Genus: Bacchisa
- Species: B. nigriventris

Binomial name
- Bacchisa nigriventris (Thomson, 1865)

Synonyms
- Astathes nigriventris J. Thomson, 1865; Bacchisa parteflavosternalis Breuning, 1956; Chreonoma nigriventris Pascoe, 1867; Chreonoma tabida Pascoe, 1867

Species of beetle

Bacchisa nigriventris is a species of beetle in the family Cerambycidae. It was described by Thomson in 1865. It is known from Borneo and Malaysia.
