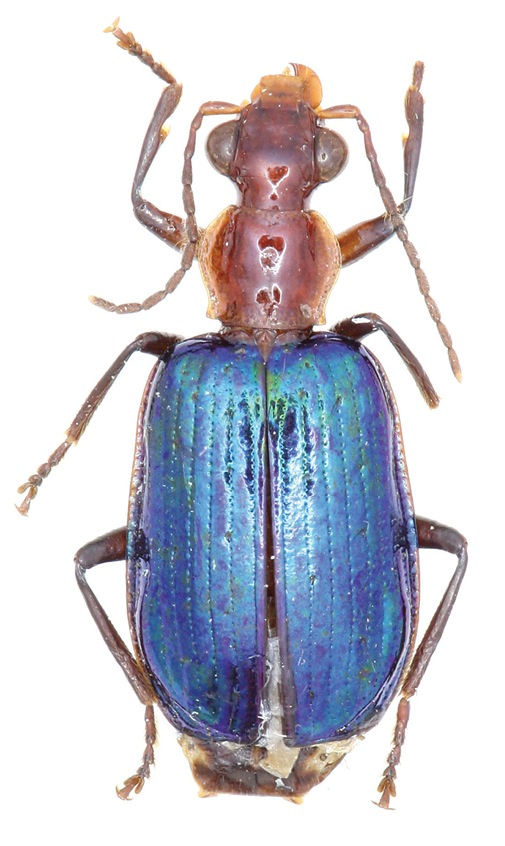

Scientific classification
- Kingdom: Animalia
- Phylum: Arthropoda
- Clade: Pancrustacea
- Class: Insecta
- Order: Coleoptera
- Suborder: Adephaga
- Family: Carabidae
- Genus: Allocota
- Species: A. viridipennis

Binomial name
- Allocota viridipennis Motschulsky, 1859

Synonyms
- Allocota caerulea Andrewes, 1933; Allocota coerulea Kirschenhofer, 1996 [misspelling]

= Allocota viridipennis =

Species of beetle

Allocota viridipennis is a species of either brownish-green or reddish-blue coloured ground beetle in the Lebiinae subfamily that can be found in such Indonesian islands as Borneo, Java and Sumatra.
