= Bacchisa rigida =

Scientific classification
- Domain: Eukaryota
- Kingdom: Animalia
- Phylum: Arthropoda
- Class: Insecta
- Order: Coleoptera
- Suborder: Polyphaga
- Infraorder: Cucujiformia
- Family: Cerambycidae
- Genus: Bacchisa
- Species: B. rigida

Binomial name
- Bacchisa rigida (Gressitt, 1942)

Synonyms
- Chreonoma rigida Gressitt, 1942

Species of beetle

Bacchisa rigida is a species of beetle in the family Cerambycidae. It was described by Gressitt in 1942. It is known from China.
