= Bacchisa pennicillata =

Scientific classification
- Domain: Eukaryota
- Kingdom: Animalia
- Phylum: Arthropoda
- Class: Insecta
- Order: Coleoptera
- Suborder: Polyphaga
- Infraorder: Cucujiformia
- Family: Cerambycidae
- Genus: Bacchisa
- Species: B. pennicillata

Binomial name
- Bacchisa pennicillata (Aurivillius, 1927)

Synonyms
- Ochrocesis penicillata Aurivillius, 1927

Species of beetle

Bacchisa pennicillata is a species of beetle in the family Cerambycidae. It was described by Per Olof Christopher Aurivillius in 1927 and is known from the Philippines.
