= Glyptina nivalis =

Scientific classification
- Kingdom: Animalia
- Phylum: Arthropoda
- Class: Insecta
- Order: Coleoptera
- Suborder: Polyphaga
- Infraorder: Cucujiformia
- Family: Chrysomelidae
- Tribe: Alticini
- Genus: Glyptina
- Species: G. nivalis

Binomial name
- Glyptina nivalis Horn, 1889

Species of beetle

Glyptina nivalis is a species of flea beetle in the family Chrysomelidae. It is found in Central America and North America.
