= Pachymerola ruficollis =

- P. ruficollis ssp. ruficollis

Scientific classification
- Kingdom: Animalia
- Phylum: Arthropoda
- Clade: Pancrustacea
- Class: Insecta
- Order: Coleoptera
- Suborder: Polyphaga
- Infraorder: Cucujiformia
- Family: Cerambycidae
- Genus: Pachymerola
- Species: P. ruficollis

Binomial name
- Pachymerola ruficollis Giesbert, 1987

Species of beetle

Pachymerola ruficollis is a species of beetle in the family Cerambycidae. It was first described by Edmund Francis Giesbert in 1987.
