= Chrysaethe ochraceicollis =

Scientific classification
- Domain: Eukaryota
- Kingdom: Animalia
- Phylum: Arthropoda
- Class: Insecta
- Order: Coleoptera
- Suborder: Polyphaga
- Infraorder: Cucujiformia
- Family: Cerambycidae
- Genus: Chrysaethe
- Species: C. ochraceicollis

Binomial name
- Chrysaethe ochraceicollis (Zajciw, 1965)

Species of beetle

Chrysaethe ochraceicollis is a species of beetle in the family Cerambycidae. It was described by Zajciw in 1965.
