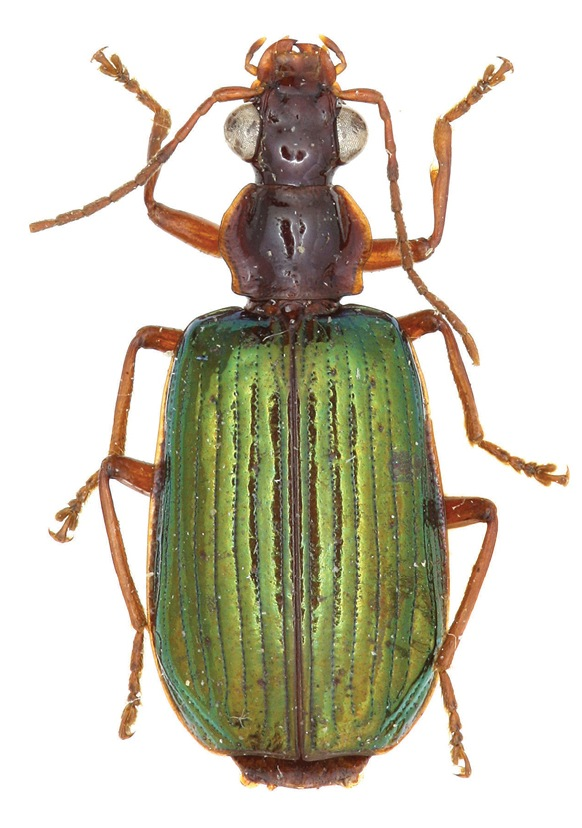

Scientific classification
- Kingdom: Animalia
- Phylum: Arthropoda
- Class: Insecta
- Order: Coleoptera
- Suborder: Adephaga
- Family: Carabidae
- Genus: Allocota
- Species: A. aurata

Binomial name
- Allocota aurata (Bates, 1873)

Synonyms
- Taicona aurata Bates, 1873; Taicona perroti Jedlička, 1963

= Allocota aurata =

Species of beetle

Allocota aurata is a species of either blackish-green or brownish-green coloured ground beetle in the Lebiinae subfamily that can be found in such Asian countries as China, Japan, Laos, Nepal, Taiwan (Formosa) and Vietnam.
