= Bacchisa coronata =

Scientific classification
- Domain: Eukaryota
- Kingdom: Animalia
- Phylum: Arthropoda
- Class: Insecta
- Order: Coleoptera
- Suborder: Polyphaga
- Infraorder: Cucujiformia
- Family: Cerambycidae
- Genus: Bacchisa
- Species: B. coronata

Binomial name
- Bacchisa coronata Pascoe, 1866

Species of beetle

Bacchisa coronata is a species of beetle in the family Cerambycidae. It was described by Pascoe in 1866.

== Subspecies ==
- Bacchisa coronata coronata Pascoe, 1866
- Bacchisa coronata philippinica Breuning, 1956
