= Ideratus nactus =

Scientific classification
- Domain: Eukaryota
- Kingdom: Animalia
- Phylum: Arthropoda
- Class: Insecta
- Order: Coleoptera
- Suborder: Polyphaga
- Infraorder: Cucujiformia
- Family: Cerambycidae
- Genus: Ideratus
- Species: I. nactus

Binomial name
- Ideratus nactus (Lane, 1970)

Species of beetle

Ideratus nactus is a species of beetle in the family Cerambycidae. It was described by Lane in 1970.
