= Hybodera tuberculata =

Scientific classification
- Kingdom: Animalia
- Phylum: Arthropoda
- Class: Insecta
- Order: Coleoptera
- Suborder: Polyphaga
- Infraorder: Cucujiformia
- Family: Cerambycidae
- Genus: Hybodera
- Species: H. tuberculata

Binomial name
- Hybodera tuberculata LeConte, 1873

Species of beetle

Hybodera tuberculata is a species of beetle in the family Cerambycidae. It was described by John Lawrence LeConte in 1873.
