= Ideratus =

Scientific classification
- Domain: Eukaryota
- Kingdom: Animalia
- Phylum: Arthropoda
- Class: Insecta
- Order: Coleoptera
- Suborder: Polyphaga
- Infraorder: Cucujiformia
- Family: Cerambycidae
- Subfamily: Cerambycinae
- Tribe: Ideratini; Martins & Napp, 2009
- Genus: Ideratus; Thomson, 1864

Genus of beetles

Ideratini is a tribe of beetles in the subfamily Cerambycinae, containing the single genus Ideratus and the following species:

- Ideratus beatus Martins, Galileo & Oliveira, 2011
- Ideratus cyanipennis (Thomson, 1864)
- Ideratus nactus (Lane, 1970)
- Ideratus sagdus (Monné & Martins, 1972)
- Ideratus virginiae (Dalens & Tavakilian, 2006)
