= Bacchisa puncticollis =

Scientific classification
- Domain: Eukaryota
- Kingdom: Animalia
- Phylum: Arthropoda
- Class: Insecta
- Order: Coleoptera
- Suborder: Polyphaga
- Infraorder: Cucujiformia
- Family: Cerambycidae
- Genus: Bacchisa
- Species: B. puncticollis

Binomial name
- Bacchisa puncticollis (Thomson, 1865)

Synonyms
- Astathes puncticollis Thomson, 1865

Species of beetle

Bacchisa puncticollis is a species of beetle in the family Cerambycidae. It was described by Thomson in 1865. It is known from the Philippines.
