= Bacchisa guerryi =

Scientific classification
- Kingdom: Animalia
- Phylum: Arthropoda
- Clade: Pancrustacea
- Class: Insecta
- Order: Coleoptera
- Suborder: Polyphaga
- Infraorder: Cucujiformia
- Family: Cerambycidae
- Genus: Bacchisa
- Species: B. guerryi

Binomial name
- Bacchisa guerryi (Pic, 1911)

Synonyms
- Astathes guerryi Pic, 1911; Chreonoma nigronotata Pic, 1912

Species of beetle

Bacchisa guerryi is a species of beetle in the family Cerambycidae. It was described by Maurice Pic in 1911. It is known from Laos and China. It contains the varietas Bacchisa guerryi var. apicalis.
