= Pachymerola toledoi =

Scientific classification
- Kingdom: Animalia
- Phylum: Arthropoda
- Class: Insecta
- Order: Coleoptera
- Suborder: Polyphaga
- Infraorder: Cucujiformia
- Family: Cerambycidae
- Genus: Pachymerola
- Species: P. toledoi

Binomial name
- Pachymerola toledoi Chemsak & Noguera, 1997

Species of beetle

Pachymerola toledoi is a species of beetle in the family Cerambycidae. It was described by Chemsak and Noguera in 1997.
