= Bacchisa dapsilis =

Scientific classification
- Domain: Eukaryota
- Kingdom: Animalia
- Phylum: Arthropoda
- Class: Insecta
- Order: Coleoptera
- Suborder: Polyphaga
- Infraorder: Cucujiformia
- Family: Cerambycidae
- Genus: Bacchisa
- Species: B. dapsilis

Binomial name
- Bacchisa dapsilis (Newman, 1842)

Species of beetle

Bacchisa dapsilis is a species of beetle in the family Cerambycidae. It was described by Newman in 1842. It is known from the Philippines.
