= Paranitocris cyanipennis =

Scientific classification
- Kingdom: Animalia
- Phylum: Arthropoda
- Class: Insecta
- Order: Coleoptera
- Suborder: Polyphaga
- Infraorder: Cucujiformia
- Family: Cerambycidae
- Genus: Paranitocris
- Species: P. cyanipennis

Binomial name
- Paranitocris cyanipennis Breuning, 1950

Synonyms
- Dirphya ianthinus Duffy, 1952

Species of beetle

Paranitocris cyanipennis is a species of beetle in the family Cerambycidae. It was described by Stephan von Breuning in 1950. It is known from the Democratic Republic of the Congo. It contains the varietas Paranitocris cyanipennis var. sericea.
