= Ideratus cyanipennis =

Scientific classification
- Domain: Eukaryota
- Kingdom: Animalia
- Phylum: Arthropoda
- Class: Insecta
- Order: Coleoptera
- Suborder: Polyphaga
- Infraorder: Cucujiformia
- Family: Cerambycidae
- Genus: Ideratus
- Species: I. cyanipennis

Binomial name
- Ideratus cyanipennis (Thomson, 1864)

Species of beetle

Ideratus cyanipennis is a species of beetle in the family Cerambycidae. It was described by Thomson in 1864.
