= Glenea cyanipennis =

Scientific classification
- Domain: Eukaryota
- Kingdom: Animalia
- Phylum: Arthropoda
- Class: Insecta
- Order: Coleoptera
- Suborder: Polyphaga
- Infraorder: Cucujiformia
- Family: Cerambycidae
- Genus: Glenea
- Species: G. cyanipennis

Binomial name
- Glenea cyanipennis (Thomson, 1858)

Species of beetle

Glenea cyanipennis is a species of beetle in the family Cerambycidae. It was described by James Thomson in 1858.

== Subspecies ==
- Glenea cyanipennis amboynica Thomson, 1860
- Glenea cyanipennis cyanipennis Thomson, 1858
