= Megachile cyanipennis =

Scientific classification
- Kingdom: Animalia
- Phylum: Arthropoda
- Clade: Pancrustacea
- Class: Insecta
- Order: Hymenoptera
- Family: Megachilidae
- Genus: Megachile
- Species: M. cyanipennis

Binomial name
- Megachile cyanipennis Guérin-Méneville, 1845

Species of leafcutter bee (Megachile)

Megachile cyanipennis is a species of bee in the family Megachilidae. It was described by Félix Édouard Guérin-Méneville in 1845.
