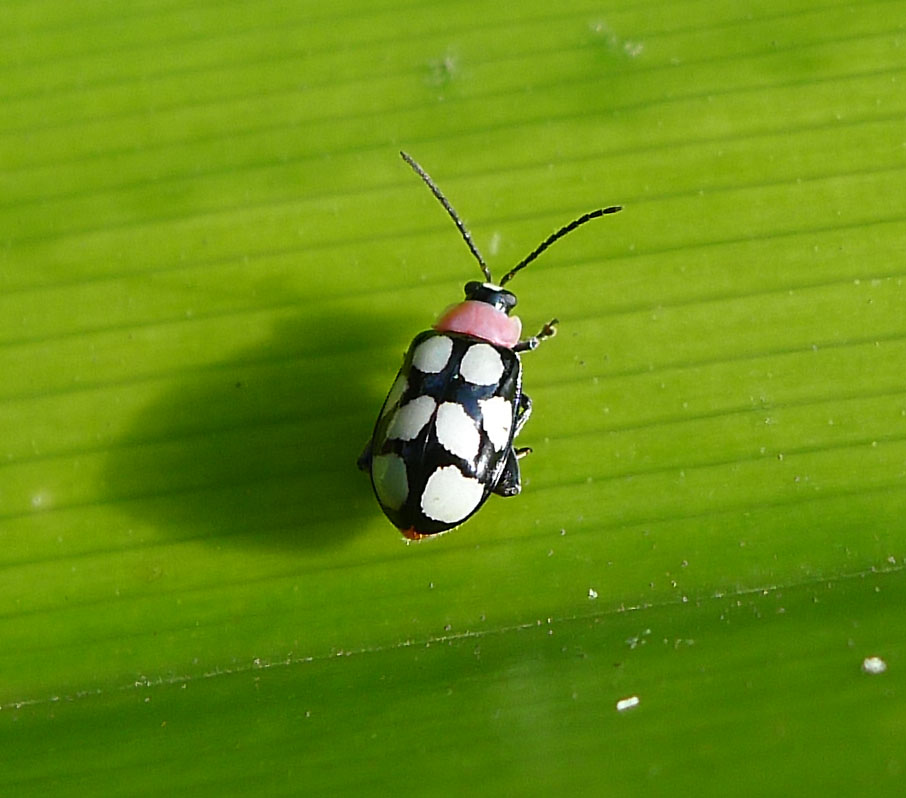

Scientific classification
- Kingdom: Animalia
- Phylum: Arthropoda
- Clade: Pancrustacea
- Class: Insecta
- Order: Coleoptera
- Suborder: Polyphaga
- Infraorder: Cucujiformia
- Family: Chrysomelidae
- Genus: Omophoita
- Species: O. cyanipennis

Binomial name
- Omophoita cyanipennis (Fabricius, 1798)

= Omophoita cyanipennis =

Species of beetle

Omophoita cyanipennis, the eight-spotted flea beetle, is a species of flea beetle in the family Chrysomelidae. It is found in the Caribbean Sea, Central América, North América and Colombia, Valle del Cauca.

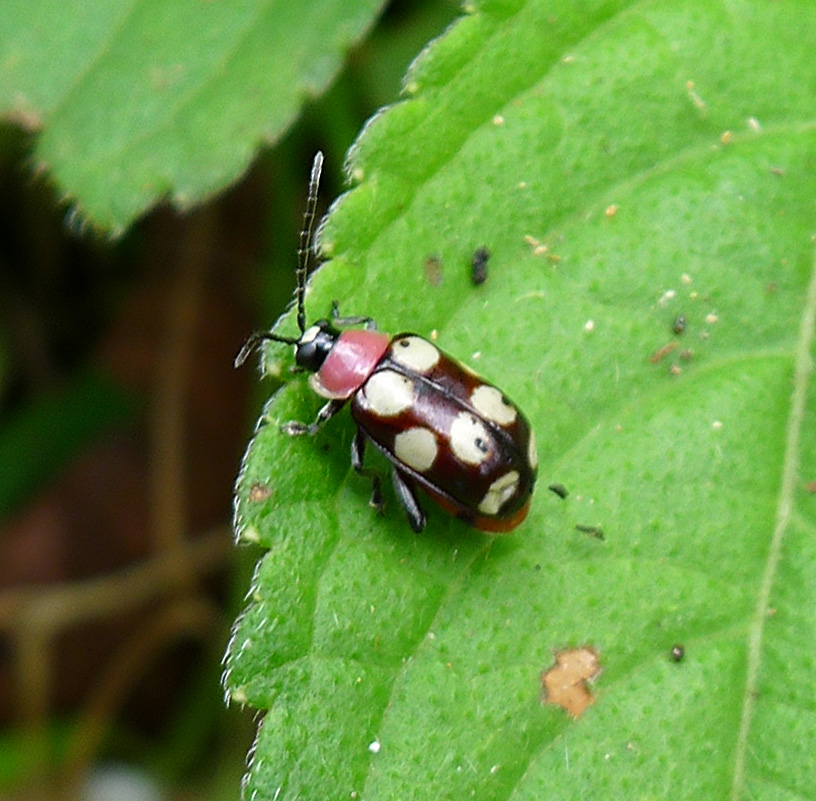
Eight-spotted flea beetle, Omophoita cyanipennis

== Subspecies ==
These two subspecies belong to the species Omophoita cyanipennis:

- Omophoita cyanipennis cyanipennis (Fabricius, 1798)
- Omophoita cyanipennis octomaculata (Crotch, 1873)
