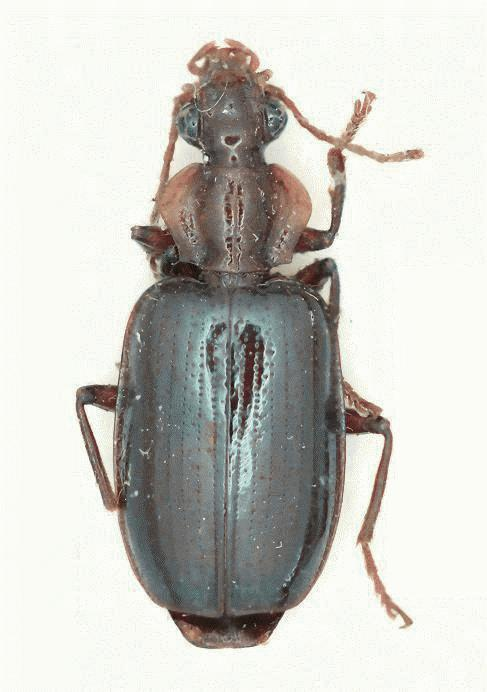

Scientific classification
- Kingdom: Animalia
- Phylum: Arthropoda
- Class: Insecta
- Order: Coleoptera
- Suborder: Adephaga
- Family: Carabidae
- Genus: Diamella
- Species: D. arrowi

Binomial name
- Diamella arrowi (Jedlička, 1935)

Synonyms
- Lachnoderma arrowi Jedlička, 1935; Allocota arrowi (Jedlicka, 1935)

= Diamella arrowi =

Species of beetle

Diamella arrowi is a species of ground beetle in the Lebiinae subfamily that is endemic to the Philippines. The species is black coloured and is 7.3 millimetres (0.29 in) in length.
