= Pseudopilema =

Scientific classification
- Kingdom: Animalia
- Phylum: Arthropoda
- Class: Insecta
- Order: Coleoptera
- Suborder: Polyphaga
- Infraorder: Cucujiformia
- Family: Cerambycidae
- Genus: Pseudopilema
- Species: P. hoppingi

Binomial name
- Pseudopilema hoppingi (Van Dyke, 1920)

Genus of beetles

Pseudopilema hoppingi is a species of beetle in the family Cerambycidae, and the only species in the genus Pseudopilema. It was described by Van Dyke in 1920.
