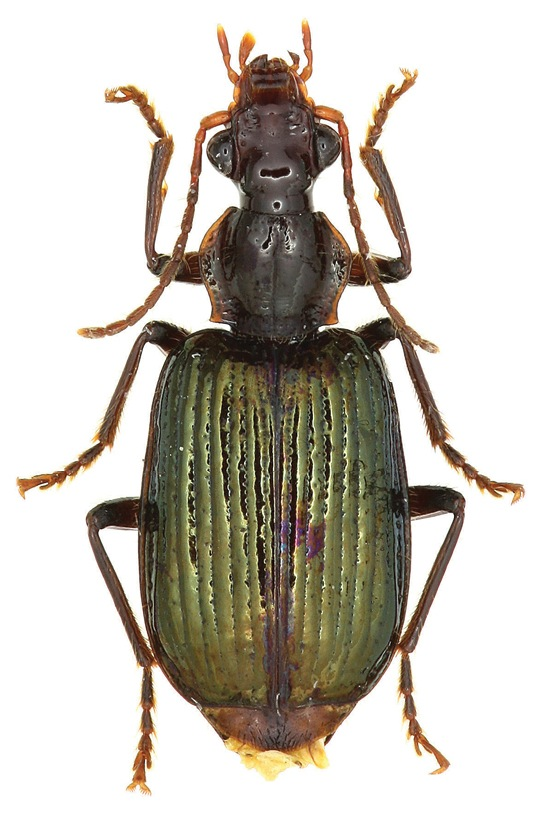

Scientific classification
- Kingdom: Animalia
- Phylum: Arthropoda
- Clade: Pancrustacea
- Class: Insecta
- Order: Coleoptera
- Suborder: Adephaga
- Family: Carabidae
- Genus: Diamella
- Species: D. cupreomicans

Binomial name
- Diamella cupreomicans (Oberthür, 1883)

Synonyms
- Calleida cupreomicans Oberthür, 1883

= Diamella cupreomicans =

Species of Asian beetle

Diamella cupreomicans is a species of ground beetle in the Lebiinae subfamily that can be found in China, Indonesia, Myanmar, Laos, Malaysia, and Vietnam. The species is blackish-green in colour and is 6.9 millimetres (0.27 in) in length.

== Further distribution ==
In China it can be found in such provinces as Guangxi, Hainan, and Yunnan, while in Indonesia it is found on Borneo, Java and Sumatra islands.
