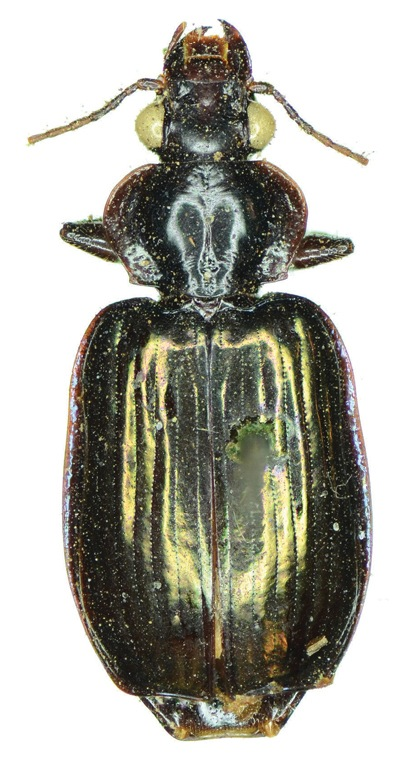

Scientific classification
- Kingdom: Animalia
- Phylum: Arthropoda
- Clade: Pancrustacea
- Class: Insecta
- Order: Coleoptera
- Suborder: Adephaga
- Family: Carabidae
- Genus: Metallanchista
- Species: M. perlaeta

Binomial name
- Metallanchista perlaeta (Kirschenhofer, 1994)

Synonyms
- Allocota perlaeta Kirschenhofer, 1994

= Metallanchista perlaeta =

Species of beetle

Metallanchista perlaeta is a species of black coloured ground beetle in the subfamily Lebiinae that can be found in such Asian countries as Malaysia and Indonesian islands such as Java and Sumatra.
