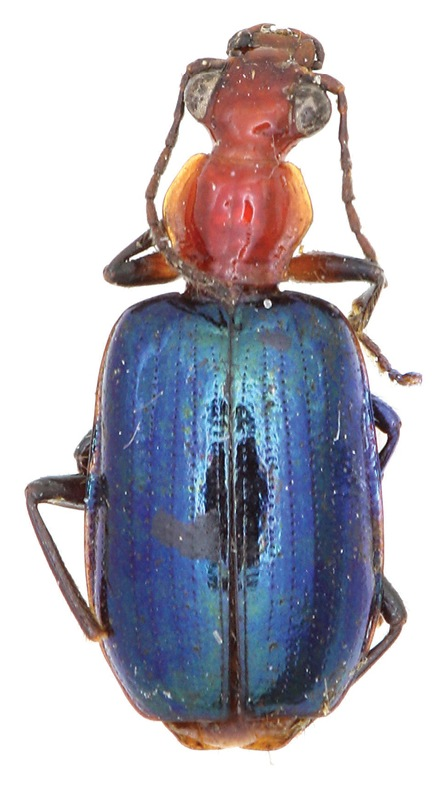

Scientific classification
- Kingdom: Animalia
- Phylum: Arthropoda
- Clade: Pancrustacea
- Class: Insecta
- Order: Coleoptera
- Suborder: Adephaga
- Family: Carabidae
- Genus: Allocota
- Species: A. cyanipennis

Binomial name
- Allocota cyanipennis Heller, 1923

= Allocota cyanipennis =

Species of beetle

Allocota cyanipennis is a species of either bluish-red or violet-red coloured ground beetle in the Lebiinae subfamily that can be found in such Asian countries as Philippines and Indonesian island of Sulawesi.
