= Dianella (gastropod) =

Scientific classification
- Kingdom: Animalia
- Phylum: Mollusca
- Class: Gastropoda
- Subclass: Caenogastropoda
- Order: Littorinimorpha
- Family: Hydrobiidae
- Subfamily: Pyrgulinae
- Genus: Dianella; Gude, 1913

Type species
- * Diana Clessin, 1878 (primary homonym): Dianella thiesseana (Kobelt, 1878)

Genus of gastropods

Dianella is a little-known genus of small freshwater snails with a gill and an operculum, aquatic gastropod molluscs in the family Hydrobiidae.

== Distribution ==
These are European freshwater snails; they occur in southeastern Europe, from northern Italy, through the Balkans, to the Black Sea and the Caspian Sea

== Description ==
Their relatively big shell has an conic or turriform shape with a common, prominent, spiral sculpture. The radula shows a rhachidian tooth with no basal cusps. Their stomach has a caecal appendix at its pyloric end. They have a Hydrobia-like central nervous system, a simple penis and a characteristic, big seminal receptacle at the end of a prominent spiral of the coiled oviduct.

== Species ==
Species within the genus Dianella include:

- † Dianella gracilis (Pavlović, 1903)
- Dianella schlickum Schütt, 1962
- Dianella thiesseana Kobelt, 1878

Species brought into synonymy

- † Dianella crassa (Burgerstein, 1877): synonym of † Prososthenia crassa Burgerstein, 1877
- † Dianella nodosa (Burgerstein, 1877): synonym of † Prososthenia nodosa Burgerstein, 1877
- † Dianella reticulata (Burgerstein, 1877): synonym of † Prososthenia reticulata Burgerstein, 1877
- † Dianella suessi (Burgerstein, 1877): synonym of † Prososthenia suessi Burgerstein, 1877
