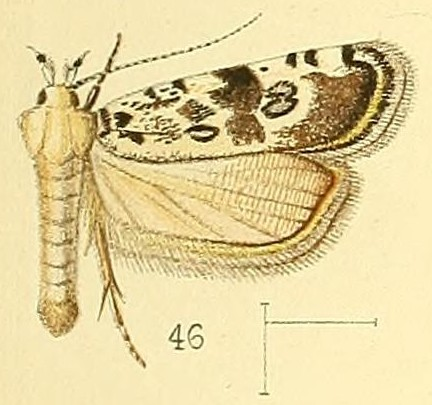
- Dactylethrella bryophilella

Scientific classification
- Kingdom: Animalia
- Phylum: Arthropoda
- Class: Insecta
- Order: Lepidoptera
- Family: Gelechiidae
- Subfamily: Anacampsinae
- Genus: Dactylethrella; T. B. Fletcher, 1940

Synonyms
- Dactylethra Meyrick, 1906 nec. Dactylethra Cuvier, 1829

= Dactylethrella =

Genus of moths

Dactylethrella is a genus of moths in the family Gelechiidae. The genus was described by Thomas Bainbrigge Fletcher in 1940 and is a replacement name for Dactylethra Meyrick, 1906 (preoccupied by Dactylethra Cuvier, 1829).

== Taxonomy ==
The type species of both aforementioned genera is Dactylethra tetroctas Meyrick, 1906 from Sri Lanka, later a junior subjective synonym of Dactylethrella candida (Stainton, 1859).

== Species ==
The species of this genus are:

- Dactylethrella bryophilella (Walsingham, 1891) – Gambia
- Dactylethrella candida (Stainton, 1859) – Sri Lanka
- Dactylethrella chionitis (Meyrick, 1910) – South Africa
- Dactylethrella globulata (Meyrick, 1910) – Sri Lanka
- Dactylethrella incondita (Meyrick, 1913) – Sri Lanka
- Dactylethrella leuconota Bidzilya & Mey, 2011 – Namibia
- Dactylethrella siccifolii (Walsingham, 1881) – South Africa
- Dactylethrella tetrametra (Meyrick, 1913) – South Africa

The Asian species (amongst others) are subsequently placed in other genera:

- Dactylethrella catarina Pnomarenko – China
- Dactylethrella shenae Li & Zheng, 1998 – China
- Dactylethrella tegulifera (Meyrick) – China

(See also "Dactylethrella albidella" of some listings, may be from protonym Nothris albidella Snellen, 1884, later Empalactis albidella (Snellen, 1884).)
