= Encolapta =

Scientific classification
- Kingdom: Animalia
- Phylum: Arthropoda
- Clade: Pancrustacea
- Class: Insecta
- Order: Lepidoptera
- Family: Gelechiidae
- Subfamily: Anacampsinae
- Genus: Encolapta; Meyrick, 1913

Type species
- Encolapta metorcha Meyrick, 1913

Synonyms
- Chelophoba Meyrick, 1935; Homoshelas Meyrick, 1935

Genus of moths

Encolapta is a genus of moths in the family Gelechiidae.

== Species ==
The following 22 species are recognized by the Catalogue of World Gelechiidae:

- Encolapta aciprojecta Yang & Li, 2016
- Encolapta aganactes (Meyrick, 1935)
- Encolapta bifasciaria Yang & Li, 2016
- Encolapta catarina (Ponomarenko, 1994)
- Encolapta cornuta Yang & Li, 2016
- Encolapta epichthonia (Meyrick, 1935)
- Encolapta heppneri (Park, 1995)
- Encolapta lunata Yang & Li, 2016
- Encolapta marginans (Li & Zheng, 1998)
- Encolapta melaina (Clarke, 1986)
- Encolapta metorcha Meyrick, 1913
- Encolapta najuensis Park & Byun, 2021
- Encolapta obliquata Yang & Li, 2016
- Encolapta pinnata (Meyrick, 1931)
- Encolapta scriniata (Meyrick, 1913)
- Encolapta shenae (Li & Zheng, 1998)
- Encolapta sheni (Li & Wang, 1999)
- Encolapta stasimodes (Meyrick, 1931)
- Encolapta subtegulifera (Ponomarenko, 1994)
- Encolapta tegulifera (Meyrick, 1932)
- Encolapta trapezoidea Yang & Li, 2016
- Encolapta valvispinata (Li, 2002)

Other sources lists fewer (4 to 7) species.
