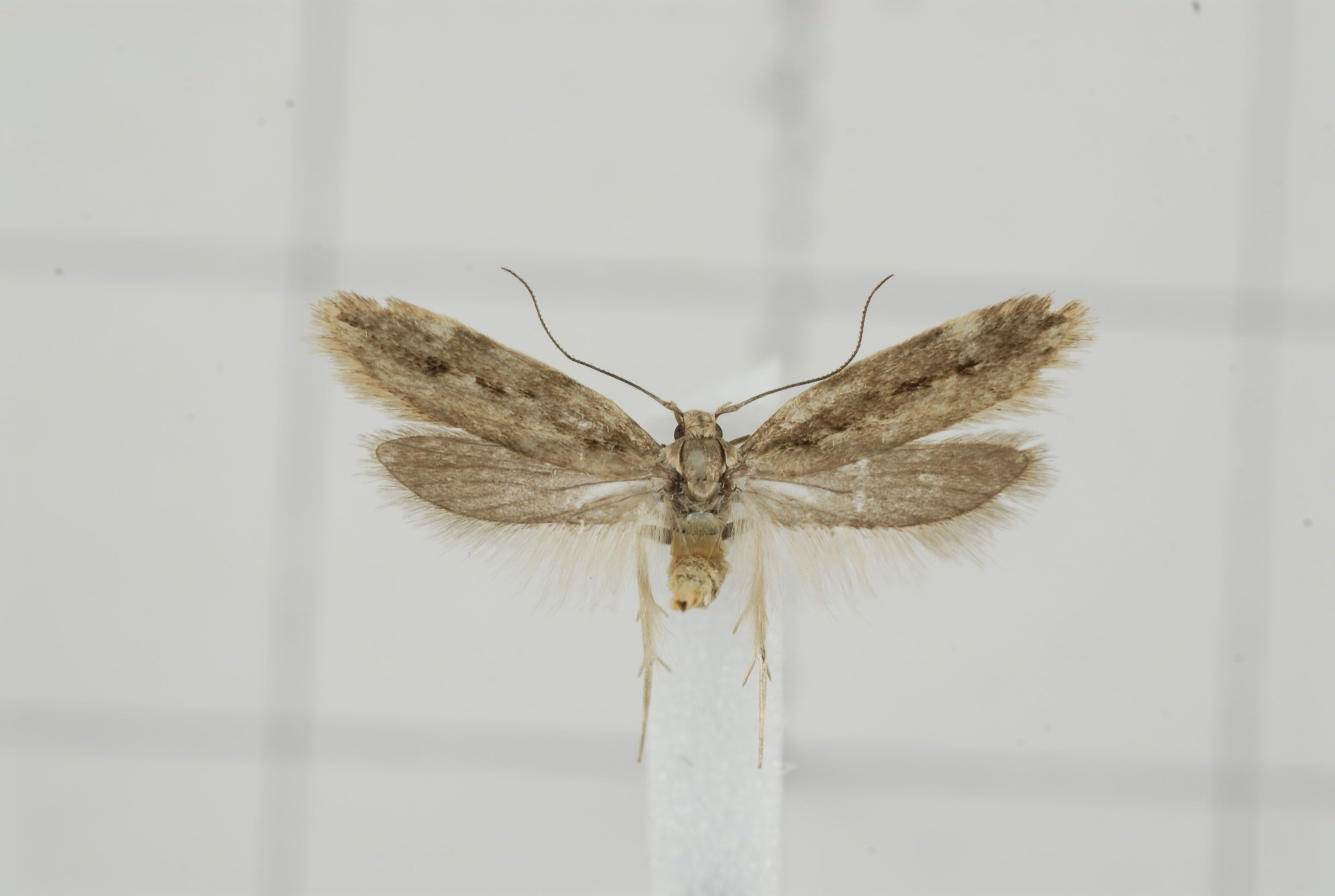

Scientific classification
- Kingdom: Animalia
- Phylum: Arthropoda
- Clade: Pancrustacea
- Class: Insecta
- Order: Lepidoptera
- Family: Gelechiidae
- Tribe: Chelariini
- Genus: Ethmiopsis; Meyrick in Caradja & Meyrick, 1935

Type species
- Ethmiopsis prosectrix Meyrick in Caradja & Meyrick, 1935

Synonyms
- Homochelas J.F.G.Clarke, 1969 (unjustified emendation); Homoshelas Meyrick in Caradja & Meyrick, 1935; Chelophoba Meyrick, 1935; Cheiophoba (lapsus)

= Ethmiopsis =

Genus of moths

Ethmiopsis is a genus of the twirler moth family (Gelechiidae). Among these, it was previously assigned to subfamily Pexicopiinae, but later moved to the Chelariini tribe.

== Species ==
Species of Ethmiopsis are:

- Ethmiopsis aganactes (Meyrick, 1935)
- Ethmiopsis catarina (Ponomarenko, 1994)
- Ethmiopsis epichthonia (Meyrick in Caradja & Meyrick, 1935)
- Ethmiopsis heppneri (Park, 1995)
- Ethmiopsis melaina (Clarke, 1986)
- Ethmiopsis prosectrix Meyrick in Caradja & Meyrick, 1935
- Ethmiopsis scriniata (Meyrick, 1913)
- Ethmiopsis subtegulifera (Ponomarenko, 1994)
- Ethmiopsis tegulifera (Meyrick, 1932)

== Taxonomy ==
At least some of these moths are characterized by a short scape and a triangular tuft of short hairs on the tip of the second labial palp segment. These traits are shared by the enigmatic Chelophoba melaina, and Clarke stated that it might be warranted to include this (or even all of Chelophoba) in Ethmiopsis. Ponomarenko eventually treated Chelophoba as a synonym of Ethmiopsis in 1997.

The species formerly placed in Chelophoba are widely allopatric, with C. aganactes occurring in China and C. melaina only known from Fatu Hiva in the Marquesas Islands of Polynesia. The latter species was thought to actually be more closely related to some twirler moths usually placed in Hypatima. At the time of description, it was unknown whether Chelophoba was monotypic and "C." melaina would in Hypatima, or whether the other species ought to be moved into Chelophoba. Alternatively, it was proposed that C. melaina might belong in the genus Ethmiopsis, as it resembles E. epichthonia in some anatomical details; Clarke stated that perhaps Chelophoba might be synonymized with Ethmiopsis outright.
