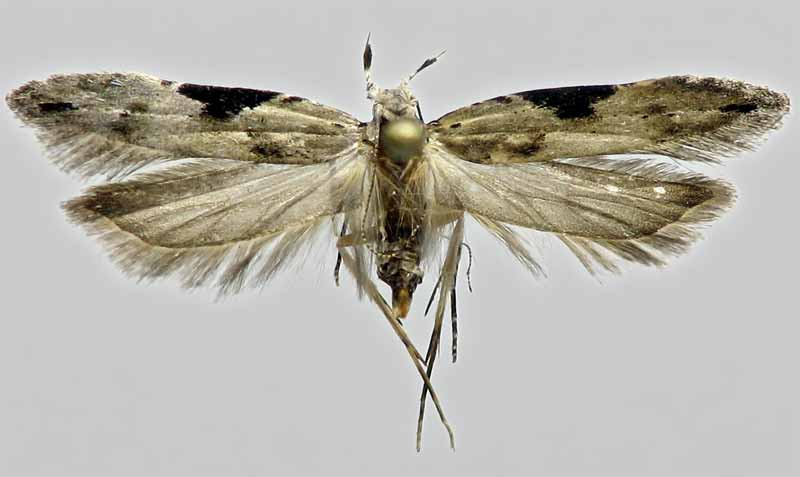
- Lobster-clawed moth (Hypatima rhomboidella) specimen

Scientific classification
- Kingdom: Animalia
- Phylum: Arthropoda
- Clade: Pancrustacea
- Class: Insecta
- Order: Lepidoptera
- Family: Gelechiidae
- Subfamily: Anacampsinae
- Genus: Hypatima; Hübner, 1825

Type species
- Tinea conscriptella Hübner, 1805

Species
- Dozens, see text

Synonyms
- Many, see text

= Hypatima =

Genus of moths

Hypatima is a genus of the twirler moth family (Gelechiidae). Among these, it belongs to a distinct lineage, which is variously treated as tribe Chelariini in subfamilies Dichomeridinae (like done here), Gelechiinae, or even Pexicopiinae, and historically was considered a subfamily in its own right, Chelariinae. Of this lineage, Hypatima – under its junior synonym Chelaria – is the type genus. This genus has numerous species, but its exact limits are not quite clear (see below). This genus occurs mainly in the Southern Hemisphere, though one of the better-known species is the only member of this genus native to Europe, the lobster-clawed moth (H. rhomboidella).

== Species ==
Species of Hypatima include:

- Hypatima acicula Park & Ponomarenko, 1999
- Hypatima acris Park, 1995
- Hypatima agriogramma (Meyrick, 1926)
- Hypatima albogrisea (Walsingham, 1881)
- Hypatima ammonura (Meyrick, 1921)
- Hypatima anguinea (Meyrick, 1913)
- Hypatima anthotypa (Meyrick, 1939)
- Hypatima antiastis (Meyrick, 1929)
- Hypatima antsianakella Viette, 1956
- Hypatima apparitrix (Meyrick, 1921)
- Hypatima aridella (Walker, 1864)
- Hypatima arignota (Meyrick, 1916)
- Hypatima artochroma Diakonoff, 1954
- Hypatima attenuata (Meyrick, 1920)
- Hypatima baliodes (Lower, 1920)
- Hypatima binummulata (Meyrick, 1929)
- Hypatima brachyrrhiza (Meyrick, 1921)
- Hypatima caryodora (Meyrick, 1913)
- Hypatima cirrhospila (Meyrick, 1920)
- Hypatima corynetis (Meyrick, 1913)
- Hypatima cryptopluta Diakonoff, 1954
- Hypatima cyrtopleura (Turner, 1919)
- Hypatima demonstrata (Meyrick, 1920)
- Hypatima dermatica (Meyrick, 1921)
- Hypatima deviella (Walker, 1864)
- Hypatima discissa (Meyrick, 1916)
- Hypatima disetosella Park, 1995
- Hypatima disposita (Meyrick, 1931)
- Hypatima dissidens (Meyrick, 1913)
- Hypatima ephippias (Meyrick, 1937)
- Hypatima ericta (Meyrick, 1913)
- Hypatima euchorda (Meyrick, 1923)
- Hypatima euplecta (Meyrick, 1904)
- Hypatima excellentella Ponomarenko, 1991
- Hypatima formidolosa (Meyrick, 1916)
- Hypatima haligramma (Meyrick, 1926)
- Hypatima harpophora (Meyrick, 1921)
- Hypatima hora (Busck, 1914)
- Hypatima improba (Meyrick, 1913)
- Hypatima indica (Swinhoe, 1885)
- Hypatima instaurata (Meyrick, 1921)
- Hypatima iophana (Meyrick, 1913)
- Hypatima isopogon (Meyrick, 1929)
- Hypatima isoptila (Meyrick, 1913)
- Hypatima isotricha (Meyrick, 1921)
- Hypatima issikiana Park, 1995
- Hypatima lactifera (Meyrick, 1913)
- Hypatima lecticata (Meyrick, 1926)
- Hypatima loxosaris (Meyrick, 1918)
- Hypatima mancipata (Meyrick, 1913)
- Hypatima mangiferae Satter, 1989
- Hypatima manjakatompo Viette, 1956
- Hypatima melanecta (Meyrick, 1914)
- Hypatima melanocharis (Meyrick, 1934)
- Hypatima meliptila (Meyrick, 1926)
- Hypatima metaphorica (Meyrick, 1921)
- Hypatima microgramma (Meyrick, 1920)
- Hypatima mycetinopa (Meyrick, 1934)
- Hypatima nigrogrisea Janse, 1949
- Hypatima nimbigera (Meyrick, 1926)
- Hypatima nodifera (Meyrick, 1930)
- Hypatima orthomochla (Meyrick, 1932)
- Hypatima orthostathma (Meyrick, 1921)
- Hypatima ovata Park & Ponomarenko, 1999
- Hypatima parichniota (Meyrick, 1938)
- Hypatima particulata (Meyrick, 1913)
- Hypatima pentagonia Park & Ponomarenko, 1999
- Hypatima perinetella Viette, 1956
- Hypatima phacelota (Meyrick, 1913)
- Hypatima pilosella (Walker, 1864)
- Hypatima probolaea (Meyrick, 1913)
- Hypatima procax (Meyrick, 1911)
- Hypatima rhicnota (Meyrick, 1916)
- Hypatima rhomboidella – lobster-clawed moth
- Hypatima scopulosa (Meyrick, 1913)
- Hypatima scotia (Turner, 1919)
- Hypatima silvestris (Meyrick, 1913)
- Hypatima simulacrella (Meyrick, 1904)
- Hypatima solutrix (Meyrick, 1911)
- Hypatima sorograpta (Meyrick, 1931)
- Hypatima spathota (Meyrick, 1913)
- Hypatima sphenophora (Meyrick, 1904)
- Hypatima stasimodes (Meyrick, 1931)
- Hypatima stenosa Park & Ponomarenko, 1999
- Hypatima subdentata Diakonoff, 1954
- Hypatima sublectella (Walker, 1864)
- Hypatima syncrypta (Meyrick, 1916)
- Hypatima tenebrosa (Meyrick, 1920)
- Hypatima tephroplintha (Meyrick, 1923)
- Hypatima tephroptila (Meyrick, 1931)
- Hypatima teramotoi Ueda, 2012
- Hypatima tessulata (Meyrick, 1921)
- Hypatima tetraptila (Meyrick 1909)
- Hypatima tonsa (Meyrick, 1913)
- Hypatima toreuta (Turner, 1919)
- Hypatima trachymorpha (Meyrick, 1927)
- Hypatima trachyspila (Meyrick, 1933)
- Hypatima triannulata (Meyrick, 1911)
- Hypatima tricosma (Meyrick, 1933)
- Hypatima venefica Ponomarenko, 1991
- Hypatima verticosa (Meyrick, 1913)
- Hypatima vinculata Pathania and Rose, 2003
- Hypatima xerophanta (Meyrick, 1930)
- Hypatima xylotechna (Meyrick, 1932)
- Hypatima zesticopa (Meyrick, 1929)

== Former species ==
- Hypatima austerodes (Meyrick, 1918)
- Hypatima conscriptella (Hübner, 1805)
- Hypatima praemaculata (Meyrick, 1931)

== Taxonomy and systematics ==
The genus Hypatima was established by Jacob Hübner about 1825, though some authors mistakenly credited G.A.W. Herrich-Schäffer to have done it about 1853. Herrich-Schäffer, however, only cited the genus as established by Hübner. As regards Chelaria, this has been treated as distinct genus by several authors. But this was based on the mistaken assumption that its type species, "Chelaria conscripta", was a distinct taxon. However, it is merely an unjustified name-change of Hypatima conscriptella, and hence Hypatima and Chelaria are objective synonyms.

A group within this genus is remarkably similar to Chelophoba melaina, an enigmatic species that is generally assigned to the twirler moth subfamily Pexicopiinae, though its exact relationships therein are obscure. As remarked above, the Chelariini have occasionally been allied with the Pexicopiinae. In any case, it is not impossible that this group might be better assigned to Chelophoba.

=== Synonyms ===
Due to its somewhat convoluted taxonomic history, there are many junior synonyms or otherwise invalid scientific names for Hypatima moths. Some of these might theoretically apply as subgenus names, but this is not usually done pending a thorough review of the genus. The obsolete scientific names are:

- Allocota Meyrick, 1904 (non Motschulsky, 1860: preoccupied)
- Allocotaniana Strand, 1913
- Cellaria (lapsus)
- Chelaria Haworth, 1828
- Cheleria (lapsus)
- Cymatomorpha Meyrick, 1904
- Deuteroptila Meyrick, 1904
- Episacta Turner, 1919
- Hypatina (lapsus)
- Semodictis Meyrick, 1909
- Stomylia Snellen, 1878
- Tituacia Walker, 1864
