= Hypatima lactifera =

Scientific classification
- Domain: Eukaryota
- Kingdom: Animalia
- Phylum: Arthropoda
- Class: Insecta
- Order: Lepidoptera
- Family: Gelechiidae
- Genus: Hypatima
- Species: H. lactifera

Binomial name
- Hypatima lactifera (Meyrick, 1913)

Synonyms
- Chelaria lactifera Meyrick, 1913

Species of moth

Hypatima lactifera is a moth in the family Gelechiidae. It was described by Edward Meyrick in 1913. It is found in Assam, India.

The wingspan is about 14 mm. The forewings are chocolate brown, becoming deeper towards the costa and apex. There is an ochreous-whitish patch on the base of the costa, including a small dark brown spot on the base of the costa, and a black subcostal dot near the base. There is also a streak of ochreous-white suffusion along the dorsum from the base to the tornus. The stigmata are represented by undefined blackish dashes, the plical rather before the first discal, preceded by a blackish dot on the fold. A black dot is found on the tornus and there is some irregular pale grey irroration (sprinkling) on the apical third, as well as a black dash resting on the termen beneath the apex. The hindwings are grey, thinly scaled and iridescent anteriorly, and with the veins and termen darker.
