= Hypatima metaphorica =

Scientific classification
- Domain: Eukaryota
- Kingdom: Animalia
- Phylum: Arthropoda
- Class: Insecta
- Order: Lepidoptera
- Family: Gelechiidae
- Genus: Hypatima
- Species: H. metaphorica

Binomial name
- Hypatima metaphorica (Meyrick, 1921)

Synonyms
- Chelaria metaphorica Meyrick, 1921

Species of moth

Hypatima metaphorica is a moth in the family Gelechiidae. It was described by Edward Meyrick in 1921. It is found in Australia, where it has been recorded from Queensland.

The wingspan is about 9 mm. The forewings are dark grey irregularly irrorated (sprinkled) with whitish and with a small elongate blackish spot on the costa at one-fifth, and a larger one on the costa before the middle, each edged beneath by an ochreous dot. There is an ochreous dot near the base above the middle, edged above by a minute black strigula and there is a small blackish spot on the dorsum at one-fourth, as well as two or three undefined blackish-grey dots in the basal area. There is also a fine black twice or thrice obscurely interrupted longitudinal line in the disc from before the middle to near the termen, and a short similar line beneath the anterior portion of this representing the plical stigma. A very short black strigula is found on the fold near the tornus, and several minute dots or strigulae are indicated near the costa posteriorly. The hindwings are grey, lighter towards the base.
