= Dactylethrella candida =

Scientific classification
- Kingdom: Animalia
- Phylum: Arthropoda
- Clade: Pancrustacea
- Class: Insecta
- Order: Lepidoptera
- Family: Gelechiidae
- Genus: Dactylethrella
- Species: D. candida

Binomial name
- Dactylethrella candida (Stainton, 1859)

Synonyms
- Anarsia candida Stainton, 1859; Prays plagiferella Walker, 1863; Dactylethra tetroctas Meyrick, 1906

Species of moth

Dactylethrella candida is a moth in the family Gelechiidae. It was described by Stainton in 1859. It is found in Sri Lanka and southern India.

The wingspan is 14–15 mm. The forewings are ochreous-white with a dark fuscous dot towards the costa near the base and two transversely placed in the disc at one-fifth. There are about eight short oblique brown strigulae on the costa. There are transverse undefined patches of ochreous-brown suffusion in the disc at one-third, beyond the middle and towards the termen, the first narrow, second broader, reaching the costa and the third largest, somewhat mixed with black scales and bounded by a grey terminal streak. Between these are two lilac-grey sometimes whitish-centred irregularly eight-shaped spots in the disc before the middle and at two-thirds, the first rather oblique and the second shorter. The hindwings are fuscous-whitish.
