= Hypatima scopulosa =

Scientific classification
- Domain: Eukaryota
- Kingdom: Animalia
- Phylum: Arthropoda
- Class: Insecta
- Order: Lepidoptera
- Family: Gelechiidae
- Genus: Hypatima
- Species: H. scopulosa

Binomial name
- Hypatima scopulosa (Meyrick, 1913)

Synonyms
- Chelaria scopulosa Meyrick, 1913

Species of moth

Hypatima scopulosa is a moth in the family Gelechiidae. It was described by Edward Meyrick in 1913. It is found in southern India.

The wingspan is about 12 mm. The forewings are brown irregularly mixed with fuscous and sprinkled with whitish and with a small darker brown basal patch, and two small spots transversely placed in the disc beyond this. There is a suffused dark grey triangular blotch occupying the median third of the costa and reaching two-thirds of the way across the wing, its apical portion with several irregular black marks. There is also a short black mark resting on the termen in the middle. The hindwings are grey, paler and thinly scaled anteriorly, darker towards the apex and termen.
