= Hypatima nodifera =

Scientific classification
- Domain: Eukaryota
- Kingdom: Animalia
- Phylum: Arthropoda
- Class: Insecta
- Order: Lepidoptera
- Family: Gelechiidae
- Genus: Hypatima
- Species: H. nodifera

Binomial name
- Hypatima nodifera (Meyrick, 1930)

Synonyms
- Chelaria nodifera Meyrick, 1930

Species of moth

Hypatima nodifera is a moth in the family Gelechiidae. It was described by Edward Meyrick in 1930. It is found in Vietnam.
