= Hypatima vinculata =

Scientific classification
- Domain: Eukaryota
- Kingdom: Animalia
- Phylum: Arthropoda
- Class: Insecta
- Order: Lepidoptera
- Family: Gelechiidae
- Genus: Hypatima
- Species: H. vinculata

Binomial name
- Hypatima vinculata Pathania and Rose, 2003

Species of moth

Hypatima vinculata is a moth in the family Gelechiidae. It was described by Pathania and Rose in 2003. It is found in India.
