= Hypatima attenuata =

Scientific classification
- Domain: Eukaryota
- Kingdom: Animalia
- Phylum: Arthropoda
- Class: Insecta
- Order: Lepidoptera
- Family: Gelechiidae
- Genus: Hypatima
- Species: H. attenuata

Binomial name
- Hypatima attenuata (Meyrick, 1920)

Synonyms
- Chelaria attenuata Meyrick, 1920

Species of moth

Hypatima attenuata is a moth in the family Gelechiidae. It was described by Edward Meyrick in 1920. It is found in Australia, where it has been recorded from New South Wales.

The wingspan is about 11 mm. The forewings are light fuscous closely and suffusedly irrorated (sprinkled) with white and with a white tuft on the costa at one-fourth, preceded by a dark fuscous mark along the costa, as well as a short dark fuscous streak along the costa in the middle, beneath which is some light brownish suffusion. The stigmata are minute, black, with the first discal opposite the posterior end of this streak, with the plical rather obliquely before it. There is a small dark fuscous spot on the costa at two-thirds and there is some brownish suffusion towards the termen, and a very fine irregular twice interrupted blackish longitudinal median line in this. The hindwings are light grey, thinly scaled, towards the apex darker grey.
