= Hypatima simulacrella =

Scientific classification
- Domain: Eukaryota
- Kingdom: Animalia
- Phylum: Arthropoda
- Class: Insecta
- Order: Lepidoptera
- Family: Gelechiidae
- Genus: Hypatima
- Species: H. simulacrella

Binomial name
- Hypatima simulacrella (Meyrick, 1904)

Synonyms
- Allocota simulacrella Meyrick, 1904

Species of moth

Hypatima simulacrella is a moth in the family Gelechiidae. It was described by Edward Meyrick in 1904. It is found in Australia, where it has been recorded from New South Wales.

The wingspan is about 16 mm (0.63 in). The forewings are white, irregularly sprinkled with fuscous and dark fuscous, appearing to form small irregularly scattered dots. There is an elongate brown spot, centrally suffused with black, along the costa slightly before the middle and a small dark fuscous spot beneath the apex. The hindwings are pale whitish fuscous.
