= Hypatima pilosella =

Scientific classification
- Kingdom: Animalia
- Phylum: Arthropoda
- Class: Insecta
- Order: Lepidoptera
- Family: Gelechiidae
- Genus: Hypatima
- Species: H. pilosella

Binomial name
- Hypatima pilosella (Walker, 1864)

Synonyms
- Gelechia pilosella Walker, 1864

Species of moth

Hypatima pilosella is a moth in the family Gelechiidae. It was described by Francis Walker in 1864. It is found on Borneo.

Adults are brown, the forewings slightly rounded at the tips, speckled with cinereous, slightly tinged with purple. The exterior part has some black longitudinal streaks, and with whitish oblique outwardly converging streaks along the costa and along the interior border. The exterior border is extremely oblique. The hindwings are cupreous brown.
