= Hypatima mycetinopa =

Scientific classification
- Domain: Eukaryota
- Kingdom: Animalia
- Phylum: Arthropoda
- Class: Insecta
- Order: Lepidoptera
- Family: Gelechiidae
- Genus: Hypatima
- Species: H. mycetinopa

Binomial name
- Hypatima mycetinopa (Meyrick, 1934)

Synonyms
- Chelaria mycetinopa Meyrick, 1934

Species of moth

Hypatima mycetinopa is a moth in the family Gelechiidae. It was described by Edward Meyrick in 1934. It is found in Fiji.
