= Hypatima hora =

Scientific classification
- Domain: Eukaryota
- Kingdom: Animalia
- Phylum: Arthropoda
- Class: Insecta
- Order: Lepidoptera
- Family: Gelechiidae
- Genus: Hypatima
- Species: H. hora

Binomial name
- Hypatima hora (Busck, 1914)

Synonyms
- Psoricoptera hora Busck, 1914

Species of moth

Hypatima hora is a moth in the family Gelechiidae. It was described by August Busck in 1914. It is found in Panama.

The wingspan is about 12 mm. The forewings are light ochreous, shaded and longitudinally streaked with blackish brown and with a large, dark, brown spot that reaches from the middle of the costa to the apical fifth, followed by a small, unmottled ochreous space. There is a black streak on the middle of the fold and the extreme tip of the wing is blackish. The hindwings are light fuscous with the edges and cilia a shade darker.
