= Hypatima syncrypta =

Scientific classification
- Domain: Eukaryota
- Kingdom: Animalia
- Phylum: Arthropoda
- Class: Insecta
- Order: Lepidoptera
- Family: Gelechiidae
- Genus: Hypatima
- Species: H. syncrypta

Binomial name
- Hypatima syncrypta (Meyrick, 1916)

Synonyms
- Chelaria syncrypta Meyrick, 1916

Species of moth

Hypatima syncrypta is a moth in the family Gelechiidae. It was described by Edward Meyrick in 1916. It is found in Sri Lanka.

The wingspan is 15–16 mm. The forewings are white, irregularly sprinkled with grey, and strewn throughout with small cloudy dark grey spots arranged in transverse series, those of the median area suffused together with purplish grey and irrorated (sprinkled) with dark fuscous, forming an undefined dark transverse band occupying more than one-third of the wing. The hindwings are pale grey.
