= Ethmiopsis aganactes =

Scientific classification
- Domain: Eukaryota
- Kingdom: Animalia
- Phylum: Arthropoda
- Class: Insecta
- Order: Lepidoptera
- Family: Gelechiidae
- Genus: Ethmiopsis
- Species: E. aganactes

Binomial name
- Ethmiopsis aganactes (Meyrick, 1935)

Synonyms
- Chelophoba aganactes Meyrick, 1935

Species of moth

Ethmiopsis aganactes is a moth in the family Gelechiidae. It was described by Edward Meyrick in 1935. It is found in Zhejiang, China.
