= Hypatima loxosaris =

Scientific classification
- Domain: Eukaryota
- Kingdom: Animalia
- Phylum: Arthropoda
- Class: Insecta
- Order: Lepidoptera
- Family: Gelechiidae
- Genus: Hypatima
- Species: H. loxosaris

Binomial name
- Hypatima loxosaris (Meyrick, 1918)

Synonyms
- Chelaria loxosaris Meyrick, 1916

Species of moth

Hypatima loxosaris is a moth in the family Gelechiidae. It was described by Edward Meyrick in 1918. It is found in Mozambique and KwaZulu-Natal in South Africa.

The wingspan is about 17 mm. The forewings are fuscous, finely and closely irrorated (sprinkled) with white, with some scattered blackish scales. There are three or four blackish dots towards the base and a small obliquely elongate dark fuscous spot on the middle of the costa, two small costal marks anterior to this and two posterior, all separated with whitish suffusion on the costal edge. The plical and second discal stigmata are black and there is a series of cloudy dark fuscous marginal dots around the posterior part of the costa and termen. The hindwings are grey, darker posteriorly.
