= Hypatima stasimodes =

Scientific classification
- Kingdom: Animalia
- Phylum: Arthropoda
- Class: Insecta
- Order: Lepidoptera
- Family: Gelechiidae
- Genus: Hypatima
- Species: H. stasimodes

Binomial name
- Hypatima stasimodes (Meyrick, 1931)

Synonyms
- Chelaria stasimodes Meyrick, 1931

Species of moth

Hypatima stasimodes is a moth in the family Gelechiidae. It was described by Edward Meyrick in 1931. It is found in Mozambique.
