= Hypatima aridella =

Scientific classification
- Kingdom: Animalia
- Phylum: Arthropoda
- Class: Insecta
- Order: Lepidoptera
- Family: Gelechiidae
- Genus: Hypatima
- Species: H. aridella

Binomial name
- Hypatima aridella (Walker, 1864)

Synonyms
- Gelechia aridella Walker, 1864

Species of moth

Hypatima aridella is a moth in the family Gelechiidae. It was described by Francis Walker in 1864. It is found on Borneo.

Adults are pale testaceous (brick red), slender, smooth, shining, slightly silvery. The forewings are slightly rounded at the tips, with two irregular pale slate-coloured bands, which are accompanied by a few black points. The hindwings are cinereous (ash grey).
