= Hypatima apparitrix =

Scientific classification
- Domain: Eukaryota
- Kingdom: Animalia
- Phylum: Arthropoda
- Class: Insecta
- Order: Lepidoptera
- Family: Gelechiidae
- Genus: Hypatima
- Species: H. apparitrix

Binomial name
- Hypatima apparitrix (Meyrick, 1921)

Synonyms
- Chelaria apparitrix Meyrick, 1921

Species of moth

Hypatima apparitrix is a moth in the family Gelechiidae. It was described by Edward Meyrick in 1921. It is found on Java in Indonesia.

The wingspan is about 16 mm. The forewings are pale grey irregularly sprinkled with whitish and darker grey and with an irregular black subcostal dash from the base, as well as black scales tending to form slight dashes or dots scattered in the disc, surrounded by grey suffusion. The costal area is suffused with whitish from near the base to three-fourths, with three rhomboidal dark grey spots occupying it from one-fourth to two-thirds, separated by narrow oblique streaks. There is an irregular fine black longitudinal line ending in the termen beneath the apex. The hindwings are light grey, thinly scaled and purple iridescent in the disc and with the veins grey.
