= Hypatima venefica =

Scientific classification
- Kingdom: Animalia
- Phylum: Arthropoda
- Class: Insecta
- Order: Lepidoptera
- Family: Gelechiidae
- Genus: Hypatima
- Species: H. venefica

Binomial name
- Hypatima venefica Ponomarenko, 1991

Species of moth

Hypatima venefica is a moth in the family Gelechiidae. It was described by Ponomarenko in 1991. It is found in the Russian Far East, Korea and Japan.

The larvae feed on Quercus mongolica.
