= Hypatima sorograpta =

Scientific classification
- Domain: Eukaryota
- Kingdom: Animalia
- Phylum: Arthropoda
- Class: Insecta
- Order: Lepidoptera
- Family: Gelechiidae
- Genus: Hypatima
- Species: H. sorograpta

Binomial name
- Hypatima sorograpta (Meyrick, 1931)

Synonyms
- Chelaria sorograpta Meyrick, 1931

Species of moth

Hypatima sorograpta is a moth in the family Gelechiidae. It was described by Edward Meyrick in 1931. It is found on Tagula Island in Papua New Guinea.
