= Hypatima brachyrrhiza =

Scientific classification
- Domain: Eukaryota
- Kingdom: Animalia
- Phylum: Arthropoda
- Class: Insecta
- Order: Lepidoptera
- Family: Gelechiidae
- Genus: Hypatima
- Species: H. brachyrrhiza

Binomial name
- Hypatima brachyrrhiza (Meyrick, 1921)

Synonyms
- Chelaria brachyrrhiza Meyrick, 1921

Species of moth

Hypatima brachyrrhiza is a moth in the family Gelechiidae. It was described by Edward Meyrick in 1921. It is found in Fiji.

The wingspan is about 14 mm. The forewings are grey closely and suffusedly irrorated (sprinkled) with white and with several faintly indicated oblique darker marks from the costa, as well as a short blackish line along the fold about one-fourth, and a rather longer one in the middle of the disc. There are some dark fuscous scales forming an incomplete short line towards the costa before the apex and a minute black linear dot on the termen beneath the apex. The hindwings are light bluish grey.
