= Hypatima cirrhospila =

Scientific classification
- Domain: Eukaryota
- Kingdom: Animalia
- Phylum: Arthropoda
- Class: Insecta
- Order: Lepidoptera
- Family: Gelechiidae
- Genus: Hypatima
- Species: H. cirrhospila

Binomial name
- Hypatima cirrhospila (Meyrick, 1920)

Synonyms
- Chelaria cirrhospila Meyrick, 1920

Species of moth

Hypatima cirrhospila is a moth in the family Gelechiidae. It was described by Edward Meyrick in 1920. It is found in Assam, India.

The wingspan is about 12 mm. The forewings are fuscous, irregularly irrorated (sprinkled) with grey whitish and with a black longitudinal strigula edged beneath with ochreous yellowish towards the costa near the base. There is a small black trapezoidal spot on the middle of the costa, edged beneath with yellowish. A black longitudinal strigula is found beneath this in the disc, and one towards the costa obliquely before it, both edged beneath with yellowish. There is also an ochreous-yellow spot above the middle of the dorsum, edged above with black, as well as a black strigula on the fold near the tornus. The second discal stigma is small and blackish and there is a fine interrupted dark fuscous line from beyond this to the termen beneath the apex. The hindwings are grey, with the veins darker.
