= Hypatima particulata =

Scientific classification
- Kingdom: Animalia
- Phylum: Arthropoda
- Clade: Pancrustacea
- Class: Insecta
- Order: Lepidoptera
- Family: Gelechiidae
- Genus: Hypatima
- Species: H. particulata

Binomial name
- Hypatima particulata (Meyrick, 1913)

Synonyms
- Chelaria particulata Meyrick, 1913

Species of moth

Hypatima particulata is a moth in the family Gelechiidae. It was described by Edward Meyrick in 1913. It is found in Sri Lanka and Java, Indonesia.

== Description ==
The wingspan is 10–12 mm. The forewings are grey, irrorated (sprinkled) with whitish and with a series of small dark fuscous spots along the costa, one before the middle rather larger and elongate. There is an elongate dark fuscous mark on the fold at two-fifths of the wing and a small dark fuscous spot in the disc at three-fourths, as well as some brownish suffusion and irregular dark fuscous irroration towards the apex. The hindwings are dark grey, thinly scaled anteriorly.
