= Hypatima discissa =

Scientific classification
- Domain: Eukaryota
- Kingdom: Animalia
- Phylum: Arthropoda
- Class: Insecta
- Order: Lepidoptera
- Family: Gelechiidae
- Genus: Hypatima
- Species: H. discissa

Binomial name
- Hypatima discissa (Meyrick, 1916)

Synonyms
- Chelaria discissa Meyrick, 1916

Species of moth

Hypatima discissa is a moth in the family Gelechiidae. It was described by Edward Meyrick in 1916. It is found in Australia, where it has been recorded from Queensland.

The wingspan is 16–17 mm. The forewings are ochreous whitish irrorated (sprinkled) with brown and with a minute black strigula beneath the costa at the base. There are brown median and subdorsal spots near the base, and one on the costa at one-fourth, as well as a larger brown spot in the disc at one-third, edged above by a black mark, and connected with the dorsum at one-third by a brown streak. There is a narrow semi-oval blackish spot on the middle of the costa, surrounded with brown suffusion, and confluent beneath with an irregular transverse brown blotch from the dorsum beyond the middle. There is a black line, which is slightly interrupted several times, running from the apex of this blotch to the termen beneath the apex, as well as a short black dash at five-sixths of the costa. A patch of brown suffusion occupies most of the apical third of the wing. The hindwings are grey, with the veins suffused with darker and with the cell subhyaline (almost glass like) and clothed with hairs.
