= Hypatima formidolosa =

Scientific classification
- Domain: Eukaryota
- Kingdom: Animalia
- Phylum: Arthropoda
- Class: Insecta
- Order: Lepidoptera
- Family: Gelechiidae
- Genus: Hypatima
- Species: H. formidolosa

Binomial name
- Hypatima formidolosa (Meyrick, 1916)

Synonyms
- Chelaria formidolosa Meyrick, 1916

Species of moth

Hypatima formidolosa is a moth in the family Gelechiidae described by Edward Meyrick in 1916. It is found in the South African provinces of KwaZulu-Natal, Mpumalanga, and Gauteng.

The wingspan is 17–18 mm. The forewings are white and sprinkled with grey, with scattered indistinct grey spots or mottling and with two more distinct small dark grey spots on the costa before the middle, several on the posterior half, a dot on the dorsum at four-fifths, and a cloudy spot on the tornus. There is also a small semi-oval blackish spot in the middle of the costa, and one reversed in the disc somewhat before it. There is a black dash towards the costa at four-fifths, and an elongated dot beneath the apex. The hindwings are light grey, paler anteriorly.
