= Hypatima cyrtopleura =

Scientific classification
- Kingdom: Animalia
- Phylum: Arthropoda
- Class: Insecta
- Order: Lepidoptera
- Family: Gelechiidae
- Genus: Hypatima
- Species: H. cyrtopleura

Binomial name
- Hypatima cyrtopleura (Turner, 1919)

Synonyms
- Nothris cyrtopleura Turner, 1919; Anarsia cyrtopleura

Species of moth

Hypatima cyrtopleura is a moth in the family Gelechiidae. It was described by Turner in 1919. It is found in Australia, where it has been recorded from Queensland and the Northern Territory.

The wingspan is 15–16 mm. The forewings are grey-whitish with fuscous irroration and markings, consisting of four or five costal dots at one-sixths, one-third and at the middle towards the apex. There are two suffused dorsal dots before the middle and at the tornus. The median discal spots at the middle and three-fourths are more or less defined. There are also some terminal dots. The hindwings are pale grey.
