= Hypatima caryodora =

Scientific classification
- Domain: Eukaryota
- Kingdom: Animalia
- Phylum: Arthropoda
- Class: Insecta
- Order: Lepidoptera
- Family: Gelechiidae
- Genus: Hypatima
- Species: H. caryodora

Binomial name
- Hypatima caryodora (Meyrick, 1913)

Synonyms
- Chelaria caryodora Meyrick, 1913

Species of moth

Hypatima caryodora is a moth in the family Gelechiidae. It was described by Edward Meyrick in 1913. It is found in Assam, India.

The wingspan is 15–16 mm. The forewings are pale fulvous irrorated (sprinkled) with dark fuscous and with the costa, fold, and dorsum irrorated with whitish towards the base. There are two dark fuscous dots beneath the costa near the base and a triangular dark fuscous blotch occupying the median third of the costa, reaching halfway across wing, partially edged with whitish suffusion. four violet-whitish oblique strigulae are found on the costa posteriorly and there is a pale violet inwardly oblique mark from the tornus, as well as an outwardly oblique mark from the termen below the middle, and two small marks in the disc above these. A black dash rests on the termen beneath the apex. The hindwings are whitish ochreous, with the veins, apex, and termen suffused with fuscous.
