= Hypatima issikiana =

Scientific classification
- Kingdom: Animalia
- Phylum: Arthropoda
- Clade: Pancrustacea
- Class: Insecta
- Order: Lepidoptera
- Family: Gelechiidae
- Genus: Hypatima
- Species: H. issikiana

Binomial name
- Hypatima issikiana Park, 1995

Species of moth

Hypatima issikiana is a moth in the family Gelechiidae. It was described by Kyu-Tek Park in 1995. It is found in Taiwan.
