= Hypatima xerophanta =

Scientific classification
- Domain: Eukaryota
- Kingdom: Animalia
- Phylum: Arthropoda
- Class: Insecta
- Order: Lepidoptera
- Family: Gelechiidae
- Genus: Hypatima
- Species: H. xerophanta

Binomial name
- Hypatima xerophanta (Meyrick, 1930)

Synonyms
- Chelaria xerophanta Meyrick, 1930

Species of moth

Hypatima xerophanta is a moth in the family Gelechiidae. It was described by Edward Meyrick in 1930. It is found in Vietnam.
