= Hypatima ephippias =

Scientific classification
- Domain: Eukaryota
- Kingdom: Animalia
- Phylum: Arthropoda
- Class: Insecta
- Order: Lepidoptera
- Family: Gelechiidae
- Genus: Hypatima
- Species: H. ephippias

Binomial name
- Hypatima ephippias (Meyrick, 1937)

Synonyms
- Chelaria ephippias Meyrick, 1937

Species of moth

Hypatima ephippias is a moth in the family Gelechiidae. It was described by Edward Meyrick in 1937. It is found in southern India.

The larvae feed in the shoots of Tamarindus indica.
