= Hypatima tenebrosa =

Scientific classification
- Domain: Eukaryota
- Kingdom: Animalia
- Phylum: Arthropoda
- Class: Insecta
- Order: Lepidoptera
- Family: Gelechiidae
- Genus: Hypatima
- Species: H. tenebrosa

Binomial name
- Hypatima tenebrosa (Meyrick, 1920)

Synonyms
- Chelaria tenebrosa Meyrick, 1920

Species of moth

Hypatima tenebrosa is a moth in the family Gelechiidae. It was described by Edward Meyrick in 1920. It is found in Australia, where it has been recorded from South Australia.

The wingspan is 11–12 mm. The forewings are rather dark fuscous closely irrorated (sprinkled) with white, with a small tuft on the costa at one-fourth, whitish posteriorly, preceded by a small dark fuscous mark. There is an elongate dark fuscous spot on the middle of the costa, beneath this some obscure brownish-ochreous suffusion. There are short black longitudinal strigulae representing the stigmata, the first discal beneath the posterior extremity of this spot, with the plical rather obliquely before it. There is a dark fuscous streak along the median portion of the fold, and other short longitudinal streaks more or less indicated in the disc preceding the stigmata and tending to unite with them. There is also a short fine black longitudinal strigulae between the second discal and termen, towards the tornus, and beneath the costa at three-fourths, as well as small indistinct dark fuscous spots on the costa posteriorly and along the termen. The hindwings are grey, lighter and thinly scaled anteriorly.
