= Hypatima pentagonia =

Scientific classification
- Kingdom: Animalia
- Phylum: Arthropoda
- Class: Insecta
- Order: Lepidoptera
- Family: Gelechiidae
- Genus: Hypatima
- Species: H. pentagonia

Binomial name
- Hypatima pentagonia Park & Ponomarenko, 1999

Species of moth

Hypatima pentagonia is a moth in the family Gelechiidae. It was described by Kyu-Tek Park and Margarita Gennadievna Ponomarenko in 1999. It is found in Thailand.

The length of the forewings is about 15 mm. The forewings are yellowish white, densely speckled with brown scales.

== Etymology ==
The species name refers to the shape of the abdomen's eighth tergite and is derived from Greek pente (meaning five) and gonia (meaning angle).
