= Hypatima melanocharis =

Scientific classification
- Domain: Eukaryota
- Kingdom: Animalia
- Phylum: Arthropoda
- Class: Insecta
- Order: Lepidoptera
- Family: Gelechiidae
- Genus: Hypatima
- Species: H. melanocharis

Binomial name
- Hypatima melanocharis (Meyrick, 1934)

Synonyms
- Chelaria melanocharis Meyrick, 1934

Species of moth

Hypatima melanocharis is a moth in the family Gelechiidae. It was described by Edward Meyrick in 1934. It is found on Java in Indonesia.
