= Hypatima phacelota =

Scientific classification
- Domain: Eukaryota
- Kingdom: Animalia
- Phylum: Arthropoda
- Class: Insecta
- Order: Lepidoptera
- Family: Gelechiidae
- Genus: Hypatima
- Species: H. phacelota

Binomial name
- Hypatima phacelota (Meyrick, 1913)

Synonyms
- Chelaria phacelota Meyrick, 1913

Species of moth

Hypatima phacelota is a moth in the family Gelechiidae. It was described by Edward Meyrick in 1913. It is found in Sri Lanka.

The wingspan is about 12 mm. The forewings are grey irrorated (sprinkled) with whitish, with some scattered black scales and a slender black dash beneath the costa near the base, as well as a blackish semi-oval spot on the middle of the costa and three small blackish-grey spots on the costa posteriorly. The hindwings are grey, paler and thinly scaled anteriorly, with the veins and termen darker.
