= Hypatima trachymorpha =

Scientific classification
- Domain: Eukaryota
- Kingdom: Animalia
- Phylum: Arthropoda
- Class: Insecta
- Order: Lepidoptera
- Family: Gelechiidae
- Genus: Hypatima
- Species: H. trachymorpha

Binomial name
- Hypatima trachymorpha (Meyrick, 1927)

Synonyms
- Chelaria trachymorpha Meyrick, 1927

Species of moth

Hypatima trachymorpha is a moth in the family Gelechiidae. It was described by Edward Meyrick in 1927. It is found on Samoa.
