= Hypatima isoptila =

Scientific classification
- Domain: Eukaryota
- Kingdom: Animalia
- Phylum: Arthropoda
- Class: Insecta
- Order: Lepidoptera
- Family: Gelechiidae
- Genus: Hypatima
- Species: H. isoptila

Binomial name
- Hypatima isoptila (Meyrick, 1913)

Synonyms
- Chelaria isoptila Meyrick, 1913

Species of moth

Hypatima isoptila is a moth in the family Gelechiidae. It was described by Edward Meyrick in 1913. It is found in Sri Lanka.

The wingspan is 16–21 mm. The forewings are fuscous, much mixed and suffused with white, with some scattered dark fuscous scales, and small tufts of raised scales. There is a blackish dash near the base above the middle and a streak of blackish irroration (sprinkles) along the basal fourth of the dorsum, as well as a very irregularly triangular dark fuscous blotch mixed with blackish occupying the median third of the costa and reaching half across the wing. There is a rather inwardly oblique narrow streak of dark fuscous suffusion from the tornus reaching more than halfway across the wing, and a spot of dark fuscous suffusion on the costa beyond this. A slender dark fuscous streak runs along the termen. The hindwings are grey, thinly scaled and subhyaline (almost glass like) anteriorly, with the veins, apical area and termen suffused with dark fuscous.
