= Hypatima meliptila =

Scientific classification
- Domain: Eukaryota
- Kingdom: Animalia
- Phylum: Arthropoda
- Class: Insecta
- Order: Lepidoptera
- Family: Gelechiidae
- Genus: Hypatima
- Species: H. meliptila

Binomial name
- Hypatima meliptila (Meyrick, 1926)

Synonyms
- Chelaria meliptila Meyrick, 1926

Species of moth

Hypatima meliptila is a moth in the family Gelechiidae. It was described by Edward Meyrick in 1926. It is found in Papua New Guinea, where it has been recorded from New Ireland.

The wingspan is 12–13 mm (0.5 inches). The forewings are pale grey suffusedly irrorated (sprinkled) with white and with an ochreous-yellow basal dot beneath the costa, as well as scattered small light ochreous-yellow tufts except towards the apex, especially two rather larger placed transversely at the end of the cell. There are small blackish spots on the fold at one-fourth, on the dorsum below this, and near the dorsum before the middle a semi-oval blackish spot on the costa before the middle, beneath this some dark grey suffusion including the blackish plical and first discal stigmata, the former anterior. The apical third is irregularly suffused with dark grey and sprinkled with black. The hindwings are grey, lighter anteriorly.
