= Hypatima disposita =

Scientific classification
- Domain: Eukaryota
- Kingdom: Animalia
- Phylum: Arthropoda
- Class: Insecta
- Order: Lepidoptera
- Family: Gelechiidae
- Genus: Hypatima
- Species: H. disposita

Binomial name
- Hypatima disposita (Meyrick, 1931)

Synonyms
- Chelaria disposita Meyrick, 1931

Species of moth

Hypatima disposita is a moth in the family Gelechiidae. It was described by Edward Meyrick in 1931. It is found in Brazil.
