= Hypatima melanecta =

Scientific classification
- Domain: Eukaryota
- Kingdom: Animalia
- Phylum: Arthropoda
- Class: Insecta
- Order: Lepidoptera
- Family: Gelechiidae
- Genus: Hypatima
- Species: H. melanecta

Binomial name
- Hypatima melanecta (Meyrick, 1914)

Synonyms
- Chelaria melanecta Meyrick, 1914

Species of moth

Hypatima melanecta is a moth in the family Gelechiidae. It was described by Edward Meyrick in 1914. It is found in Gauteng, South Africa.

The wingspan is about 15 mm. The forewings are fuscous finely irrorated (sprinkled) with whitish, all veins marked with fine dark fuscous lines, with a few black scales, vein six marked with a fine black streak. There is a grey streak along the median third of the costa and with a darker line from three-fifths of the costa, running near the costa to the apex. The hindwings are light grey.
