= Hypatima rhicnota =

Scientific classification
- Domain: Eukaryota
- Kingdom: Animalia
- Phylum: Arthropoda
- Class: Insecta
- Order: Lepidoptera
- Family: Gelechiidae
- Genus: Hypatima
- Species: H. rhicnota

Binomial name
- Hypatima rhicnota (Meyrick, 1916)

Synonyms
- Chelaria rhicnota Meyrick, 1916

Species of moth

Hypatima rhicnota is a moth in the family Gelechiidae. It was described by Edward Meyrick in 1916. It is found in southern India.

The wingspan is 10–11 mm. The forewings are dark grey sprinkled with grey whitish, longitudinally suffused with brownish in the disc posteriorly and with five oblique dark fuscous marks on the costa between one-fifth and three-fourths and there is a linear black dot beneath the costa near the base. There is a blackish line along the fold from the base to one-third, a longitudinal black line from above apex of this to three-fifths, a shorter one beyond this, and one above and between these. There are some short longitudinal marks of blackish irroration (sprinkling) before the posterior part of the costa and termen. The hindwings are rather dark grey, with the anterior portion of the cell and area beneath it hyaline.

The larvae feed on the flowers of Mangifera indica.
