= Hypatima deviella =

Scientific classification
- Kingdom: Animalia
- Phylum: Arthropoda
- Clade: Pancrustacea
- Class: Insecta
- Order: Lepidoptera
- Family: Gelechiidae
- Genus: Hypatima
- Species: H. deviella

Binomial name
- Hypatima deviella (Walker, 1864)

Synonyms
- Tituacia deviella Walker, 1864; Stomylia erosella Snellen, 1878

Species of moth

Hypatima deviella is a moth in the family Gelechiidae. It was described by Francis Walker in 1864. It is found in Taiwan, Thailand, the Philippines, Sri Lanka, India (the Andaman Islands), on Borneo, Java and Sulawesi, as well as in Australia (Queensland).

Adults are cinereous whitish, the forewings with thirteen black points, three near the base, four placed quadrately in the interior disc, three forming a more distinct cluster in the exterior disc and three on the exterior border. Of these last, the middle one is much larger than the others. There is a fawn-coloured streak along the middle part of the costa.
