= Hypatima instaurata =

Scientific classification
- Kingdom: Animalia
- Phylum: Arthropoda
- Clade: Pancrustacea
- Class: Insecta
- Order: Lepidoptera
- Family: Gelechiidae
- Genus: Hypatima
- Species: H. instaurata

Binomial name
- Hypatima instaurata (Meyrick, 1921)

Synonyms
- Chelaria instaurata Meyrick, 1921

Species of moth

Hypatima instaurata is a moth in the family Gelechiidae. It was described by Edward Meyrick in 1921. It is found on Java in Indonesia.

The wingspan is about 14 millimetres (0.55 in). The forewings are whitish ochreous, more ochreous tinged on the basal half and with a small black dot towards the costa near the base, as well as a dark brown triangular blotch becoming blackish towards the posterior angle extending on the costa over the median third and reaching halfway across the wing, preceded on the costa by a small lighter brownish elongate spot. There is some irregular light brownish suffusion towards the costa posteriorly and an indistinct irregular brownish line along the termen, with cloudy blackish apical and subapical dots. The hindwings are grey, thinly scaled anteriorly.
