= Hypatima euplecta =

Scientific classification
- Domain: Eukaryota
- Kingdom: Animalia
- Phylum: Arthropoda
- Class: Insecta
- Order: Lepidoptera
- Family: Gelechiidae
- Genus: Hypatima
- Species: H. euplecta

Binomial name
- Hypatima euplecta (Meyrick, 1904)

Synonyms
- Cymatomorpha euplecta Meyrick, 1904; Chelaria euplecta

Species of moth

Hypatima euplecta is a species of moth in the family Gelechiidae. It was described by Edward Meyrick in 1904. It is found in Australia, where it has been recorded from Queensland, New South Wales, Victoria and South Australia.

The wingspan is 12–14 mm. The forewings are pale grey closely and suffusedly irrorated (sprinkled) with whitish and with a streak of dark fuscous suffusion along the costa from the base to beyond one-fourth, its apex edged beneath with ochreous brown and terminated by a white tuft. Below this is a fine black subcostal dash from the base to one-fifth, beneath its middle an ochreous-brownish dot and there is a transverse blotch from the middle of the costa reaching halfway across the wing, widest on the costa, with the costal portion dark fuscous, subcostal ochreous brown and discal dark grey. Sometimes, there is a blackish dot beneath this indicating the plical stigma. Females have small blackish marks on the dorsum at one-fourth and two-thirds. There is an irregular grey or dark grey spot in the disc at three-fourths. There are four small dark fuscous spots on the costa posteriorly, and a rounded terminal patch of fuscous or dark fuscous suffusion, in which are obscurely indicated a short blackish discal streak and some blackish terminal dots. The hindwings are grey, darker posteriorly.
