= Hypatima corynetis =

Scientific classification
- Domain: Eukaryota
- Kingdom: Animalia
- Phylum: Arthropoda
- Class: Insecta
- Order: Lepidoptera
- Family: Gelechiidae
- Genus: Hypatima
- Species: H. corynetis

Binomial name
- Hypatima corynetis (Meyrick, 1913)

Synonyms
- Chelaria corynetis Meyrick, 1913

Species of moth

Hypatima corynetis is a species of moth in the family Gelechiidae. It was described by Edward Meyrick in 1913. It is found in Sri Lanka.

The wingspan is 15–16 mm. The forewings are brown, sometimes tinged with ferruginous, in the disc, variably mixed and sometimes posteriorly wholly suffused with dark fuscous. The basal area is irregularly mixed or suffused with white, with some irregular dark fuscous marks, and a black subcostal dash. There is a narrow elongate black patch extending along the costa from one-sixth to three-fifths, cut by three oblique white strigulae. There is also an irregular outwardly oblique transverse black patch from the dorsum before the middle, nearly reaching the costal patch, edged with raised whitish scales. An irregularly triangular fuscous-blackish edged spot is found on the tornus, reaching halfway across the wing, surrounded with white suffusion extending to the costa and there is some irregular whitish irroration (sprinkling) towards the apex. The hindwings are light fuscous, thinly scaled and semihyaline (partially glass like), darker along the termen and towards the apex, with the veins rather dark fuscous.
