= Hypatima stenosa =

Scientific classification
- Kingdom: Animalia
- Phylum: Arthropoda
- Class: Insecta
- Order: Lepidoptera
- Family: Gelechiidae
- Genus: Hypatima
- Species: H. stenosa

Binomial name
- Hypatima stenosa Park & Ponomarenko, 1999

Species of moth

Hypatima stenosa is a moth in the family Gelechiidae. It was described by Kyu-Tek Park and Margarita Gennadievna Ponomarenko in 1999. It is found in Thailand.

The length of the forewings is about 9 mm.
