= Hypatima binummulata =

Scientific classification
- Domain: Eukaryota
- Kingdom: Animalia
- Phylum: Arthropoda
- Class: Insecta
- Order: Lepidoptera
- Family: Gelechiidae
- Genus: Hypatima
- Species: H. binummulata

Binomial name
- Hypatima binummulata (Meyrick, 1929)

Synonyms
- Chelaria binummulata Meyrick, 1929

Species of moth

Hypatima binummulata is a moth in the family Gelechiidae. It was described by Edward Meyrick in 1929. It is found in KwaZulu-Natal, South Africa.
