= Hypatima isotricha =

Scientific classification
- Domain: Eukaryota
- Kingdom: Animalia
- Phylum: Arthropoda
- Class: Insecta
- Order: Lepidoptera
- Family: Gelechiidae
- Genus: Hypatima
- Species: H. isotricha

Binomial name
- Hypatima isotricha (Meyrick, 1921)

Synonyms
- Chelaria isotricha Meyrick, 1921

Species of moth

Hypatima isotricha is a species of moth in the family Gelechiidae. It was described by Edward Meyrick in 1921. It is found on Java in Indonesia.

The wingspan is about 14 mm. The forewings are ochreous whitish sprinkled irregularly with grey, brown, and dark fuscous and with two small dark fuscous spots on the costa before and beyond one-fourth, costa between and beyond these white. There is a dark fuscous spot towards the base in the middle and an irregular suffused dark brown fasciate bar from the dorsum at one-fourth, reaching halfway across wing. There is also an irregular dark brown and blackish median fascia rather inwards oblique from the costa, followed on the costa by an oblique white strigula. The posterior half of the costa is suffused with dark fuscous, with five very oblique white wedge-shaped marks and there is a suffused dark brown spot on the dorsum beyond the fascia, as well as an irregular dark brown blotch on the tornus, marked in the middle with a black dash and a spot of dark fuscous suffusion containing an oblique black dash towards the costa near the apex. A streak of dark fuscous suffusion is found along the upper part of the termen, edged above by a black dash near the apex. The hindwings are light grey, thinly scaled and violet iridescent in the disc, with the veins and terminal edge darker grey.
