= Hypatima teramotoi =

Scientific classification
- Kingdom: Animalia
- Phylum: Arthropoda
- Clade: Pancrustacea
- Class: Insecta
- Order: Lepidoptera
- Family: Gelechiidae
- Genus: Hypatima
- Species: H. teramotoi

Binomial name
- Hypatima teramotoi Ueda, 2012

Species of moth

Hypatima teramotoi is a moth in the family Gelechiidae. It was described by Ueda in 2012. It is found in Japan (Honshu, the Ryukyus).

The length of the forewings is 6-6.5 mm for males and 6–7 mm for females.

The larvae feed on Quercus acutissima, Quercus serrata, Quercus variabilis, Quercus glauca and Quercus phillyraeoides.
