= Hypatima tephroplintha =

Scientific classification
- Domain: Eukaryota
- Kingdom: Animalia
- Phylum: Arthropoda
- Class: Insecta
- Order: Lepidoptera
- Family: Gelechiidae
- Genus: Hypatima
- Species: H. tephroplintha

Binomial name
- Hypatima tephroplintha (Meyrick, 1923)

Synonyms
- Chelaria tephroplintha Meyrick, 1923

Species of moth

Hypatima tephroplintha is a moth in the family Gelechiidae. It was described by Edward Meyrick in 1923. It is found in Fiji.

The wingspan is about 10 mm. The forewings are light brownish ochreous speckled with dark grey and about eight grey spots along the costa, smaller posteriorly, three anterior raised and preceded by slight white marks. There is a grey blotch in the disc near the base, edged with white posteriorly. There are also grey transverse fasciate blotches before and beyond the middle, edged with black and then whitish, resting on the dorsum and touching the costal spots. A cloudy grey spot is found in the disc posteriorly, and small marginal spots are found around the apex and termen. The hindwings are grey.
