= Hypatima nimbigera =

Scientific classification
- Domain: Eukaryota
- Kingdom: Animalia
- Phylum: Arthropoda
- Class: Insecta
- Order: Lepidoptera
- Family: Gelechiidae
- Genus: Hypatima
- Species: H. nimbigera

Binomial name
- Hypatima nimbigera (Meyrick, 1926)

Synonyms
- Chelaria nimbigera Meyrick, 1926

Species of moth

Hypatima nimbigera is a moth in the family Gelechiidae. It was described by Edward Meyrick in 1926. It is found in Papua New Guinea, where it has been recorded from New Ireland.

The wingspan is 16–19 mm. The forewings are light grey suffused with white with a blackish dot on the base of the costa, and one towards the costa near the base. There are small dark fuscous spots on the costa before and beyond one-fourth, and a semi-oval spot in the middle. There is an irregular patch of dark grey suffusion mixed with blackish extending along the dorsum from one-fourth to three-fourths, triangularly prominent in the middle and nearly reaching the median costal spot. There is a similar subterminal fascia leaving a whitish space before the tornus but slenderly connected with the preceding above this. There are two small blackish spots before the apex, and one on the costa at three-fourths. The hindwings are dark grey, anteriorly thinly scaled and semitransparent.
