= Hypatima dissidens =

Scientific classification
- Domain: Eukaryota
- Kingdom: Animalia
- Phylum: Arthropoda
- Class: Insecta
- Order: Lepidoptera
- Family: Gelechiidae
- Genus: Hypatima
- Species: H. dissidens

Binomial name
- Hypatima dissidens (Meyrick, 1913)

Synonyms
- Nothris improba Meyrick, 1913

Species of moth

Hypatima dissidens is a species of moth in the family Gelechiidae. It was described by Edward Meyrick in 1913. It is found in Mpumalanga, South Africa.

The wingspan is about 19 mm. The forewings are brownish, sprinkled with dark fuscous and with an undefined streak of whitish-ochreous suffusion extending from the costa near the base beneath the costa to the costa again near the apex, enclosing the costal space suffused with blackish grey. There is a short oblique line of blackish scales almost from the base of the costa preceding this and there is some broad grey suffusion along the fold, including a suffused blackish plical streak from near the base to about the middle of the wing. The discal stigmata are dark grey, connected by an elongate fuscous spot, the first edged with whitish ochreous. The terminal area is suffused with grey, streaked with dark brown and blackish irroration (sprinkles) on the veins and there are undefined small blackish spots around the apical part of the costa and termen, preceded by small obscure pale ochreous spots. The hindwings are grey.
