= Ethmiopsis heppneri =

Scientific classification
- Kingdom: Animalia
- Phylum: Arthropoda
- Clade: Pancrustacea
- Class: Insecta
- Order: Lepidoptera
- Family: Gelechiidae
- Genus: Ethmiopsis
- Species: E. heppneri

Binomial name
- Ethmiopsis heppneri (Park, 1995)

Synonyms
- Homochela heppneri Meyrick, 1935

Species of moth

Ethmiopsis heppneri is a moth in the family Gelechiidae. It was described by Kyu-Tek Park in 1995. It is found in Taiwan.
