= Hypatima anguinea =

Scientific classification
- Domain: Eukaryota
- Kingdom: Animalia
- Phylum: Arthropoda
- Class: Insecta
- Order: Lepidoptera
- Family: Gelechiidae
- Genus: Hypatima
- Species: H. anguinea

Binomial name
- Hypatima anguinea (Meyrick, 1913)

Synonyms
- Chelaria anguinea Meyrick, 1913

Species of moth

Hypatima anguinea is a moth in the family Gelechiidae. It was described by Edward Meyrick in 1913. It is found in Assam in India and in Thailand.

The wingspan is about 16 mm. The forewings are light brownish irrorated (sprinkled) with white, and irregularly sprinkled with dark fuscous. There is a short black dash beneath the costa near the base and a narrow dark fuscous patch extending along the costa from one-fifth to two-thirds, cut by two oblique white strigulae. There are some indications of irregularly scattered small undefined dark fuscous marks and there are two or three black dashes towards the apex. The hindwings are pale grey, paler and thinly scaled anteriorly.
