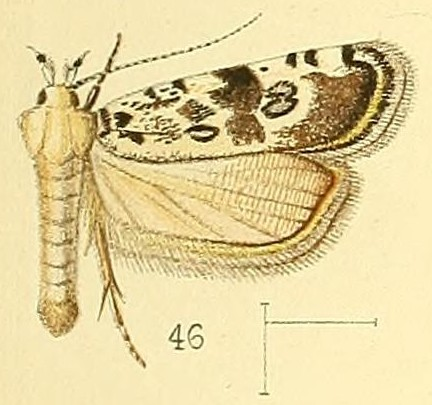

Scientific classification
- Domain: Eukaryota
- Kingdom: Animalia
- Phylum: Arthropoda
- Class: Insecta
- Order: Lepidoptera
- Family: Gelechiidae
- Genus: Dactylethrella
- Species: D. bryophilella

Binomial name
- Dactylethrella bryophilella (Walsingham, 1891)

Synonyms
- Nothris bryophilella Walsingham, 1891

= Dactylethrella bryophilella =

Species of moth

Dactylethrella bryophilella is a moth in the family Gelechiidae. It was described by Thomas de Grey, 6th Baron Walsingham, in 1891. It is found in the Democratic Republic of Congo (Equateur) and Gambia.

The wingspan is 14–18 mm. The forewings are dull white, speckled and blotched with brown. The basal third is irrorated with brown scales and there is a small fuscous spot near the costa towards the base. Immediately beyond the basal third is a large reniform greyish fuscous spot, having the appearance of two roundish contiguous spots, one reaching over the fold, the other, about the same size, above it. Beyond this is a transverse ill-defined band of brown about the middle of the wing, starting from the costal but not attaining to the dorsal margin, wider towards its upper end. This band is followed by another greyish fuscous rounded spot, larger than either of the other two, from the anal angle along the apical margin, but not quite reaching to the costal margin, where there are three fuscous spots, two small and one larger. There is a slender shining leaden grey line borders the wing, running from the anal angle along the extreme apical margin, and around the apex along the base of the costal cilia and lying on the end of the cell. This spot is followed by another large brown patch, occupying the whole apical portion of the wing. The hindwings are pale leaden grey.

The larvae feed on Tephrosia vogelii.
