= Hypatima solutrix =

Scientific classification
- Domain: Eukaryota
- Kingdom: Animalia
- Phylum: Arthropoda
- Class: Insecta
- Order: Lepidoptera
- Family: Gelechiidae
- Genus: Hypatima
- Species: H. solutrix

Binomial name
- Hypatima solutrix (Meyrick, 1911)

Synonyms
- Chelaria solutrix Meyrick, 1911

Species of moth

Hypatima solutrix is a moth in the family Gelechiidae. It was described by Edward Meyrick in 1911. It is found in South Africa's Limpopo province and in Zimbabwe.

The wingspan is about 12 mm. The forewings are brownish, irrorated (sprinkled) with grey, whitish, and dark fuscous and with an obscure streak of blackish suffusion along the costa from about one-fourth to beyond the middle, and four small spots of blackish suffusion on the costa posteriorly. The hindwings are grey.
