= Hypatima ericta =

Scientific classification
- Domain: Eukaryota
- Kingdom: Animalia
- Phylum: Arthropoda
- Class: Insecta
- Order: Lepidoptera
- Family: Gelechiidae
- Genus: Hypatima
- Species: H. ericta

Binomial name
- Hypatima ericta (Meyrick, 1913)

Synonyms
- Chelaria ericta Meyrick, 1913

Species of moth

Hypatima ericta is a moth in the family Gelechiidae. It was described by Edward Meyrick in 1913. It is found in Sri Lanka.

The wingspan is about 15 mm. The forewings are light fuscous, suffusedly irrorated (sprinkled) with whitish points and with a black dot beneath the costa near the base and a dark fuscous streak along the costa from one-fourth to two-thirds, cut by two oblique whitish strigulae. There is an elongate dark fuscous spot in the disc at two-fifths, and another at three-fourths, representing the discal stigmata. A similar spot represents the plical, rather before the first discal, connected with a black subdorsal dash beneath it. There is also a blackish dash on the fold beneath the middle, and another at the tornus beneath the second discal, as well as an oblique whitish strigula edged with dark fuscous from the costa beyond three-fourths. A black dash rests on the termen beneath the apex. The hindwings are iridescent-grey, paler and semihyaline (partially glass like) anteriorly, with the veins and termen darker grey.
