= Hypatima isopogon =

Scientific classification
- Domain: Eukaryota
- Kingdom: Animalia
- Phylum: Arthropoda
- Class: Insecta
- Order: Lepidoptera
- Family: Gelechiidae
- Genus: Hypatima
- Species: H. isopogon

Binomial name
- Hypatima isopogon (Meyrick, 1929)

Synonyms
- Chelaria isopogon Meyrick, 1929

Species of moth

Hypatima isopogon is a moth in the family Gelechiidae. It was described by Edward Meyrick in 1929. It is found in southern India.
