= Hypatima tetraptila =

Scientific classification
- Domain: Eukaryota
- Kingdom: Animalia
- Phylum: Arthropoda
- Class: Insecta
- Order: Lepidoptera
- Family: Gelechiidae
- Genus: Hypatima
- Species: H. tetraptila

Binomial name
- Hypatima tetraptila (Meyrick, 1909)

Synonyms
- Semodictis tetraptila Meyrick, 1909

Species of moth

Hypatima tetraptila is a moth in the family Gelechiidae. It was described by Edward Meyrick in 1909. It is found in the South African provinces of Gauteng and Limpopo.

The wingspan is 16–17 mm. The forewings are light grey mixed with whitish, with some scattered blackish scales, as well as several small blackish-grey spots on the basal fourth. There is a blackish-grey trapezoidal blotch in the disk before the middle, broadest beneath, preceded by some brownish suffusion. An irregular dark fuscous spot extends along the costa from one-fourth to the middle almost confluent with this. The apical two-fifths of the wing are irregularly marked with grey, suffusedly mixed with blackish, with a more defined dark spot on the costa at four-fifths, and a black mark at the apex. The hindwings are grey, paler towards the base.
