= Ethmiopsis scriniata =

Scientific classification
- Domain: Eukaryota
- Kingdom: Animalia
- Phylum: Arthropoda
- Class: Insecta
- Order: Lepidoptera
- Family: Gelechiidae
- Genus: Ethmiopsis
- Species: E. scriniata

Binomial name
- Ethmiopsis scriniata (Meyrick, 1913)

Synonyms
- Chelaria scriniata Meyrick, 1913; Hypatima scriniata

Species of moth

Ethmiopsis scriniata is a moth in the family Gelechiidae. It was described by Edward Meyrick in 1913. It is found in Sri Lanka, Vietnam and possibly Taiwan.

The wingspan is about 17 mm. The forewings are fuscous much mixed and suffused with white and with three elongate dark fuscous marks on the costa anteriorly, two posteriorly, and with a flattened-triangular spot in the middle, and three small spots towards the apex. There are some scattered blackish scales on the margins of the cell anteriorly, as well as slender black interrupted plical and median streaks on the posterior half of the wing, and two or three black dashes towards the costa posteriorly. The hindwings are grey, paler and thinly scaled anteriorly and with the veins dark grey.
