= Hypatima anthotypa =

Scientific classification
- Domain: Eukaryota
- Kingdom: Animalia
- Phylum: Arthropoda
- Class: Insecta
- Order: Lepidoptera
- Family: Gelechiidae
- Genus: Hypatima
- Species: H. anthotypa

Binomial name
- Hypatima anthotypa (Meyrick, 1939)

Synonyms
- Chelaria anthotypa Meyrick, 1939

Species of moth

Hypatima anthotypa is a moth in the family Gelechiidae. It was described by Edward Meyrick in 1939. It is found on Java in Indonesia.
