= Encolapta metorcha =

Scientific classification
- Kingdom: Animalia
- Phylum: Arthropoda
- Clade: Pancrustacea
- Class: Insecta
- Order: Lepidoptera
- Family: Gelechiidae
- Genus: Encolapta
- Species: E. metorcha

Binomial name
- Encolapta metorcha Meyrick, 1913

Species of moth

Encolapta metorcha is a species of moth in the family Gelechiidae. It is found in Sri Lanka.

== Description ==
The wingspan is 14–15 mm. The forewings are grey or fuscous irrorated with white, with some scattered blackish scales and with a series of small blackish spots along the costa, one in the middle rather larger and elongate. There are some irregular scattered groups of dark fuscous scales in the disc, as well as a pre-marginal series of cloudy dark fuscous spots around the posterior part of the costa and termen. The hindwings are grey, paler and thinly scaled anteriorly and with the veins and termen darker.
