= Hypatima triannulata =

Scientific classification
- Domain: Eukaryota
- Kingdom: Animalia
- Phylum: Arthropoda
- Class: Insecta
- Order: Lepidoptera
- Family: Gelechiidae
- Genus: Hypatima
- Species: H. triannulata

Binomial name
- Hypatima triannulata (Meyrick, 1911)

Synonyms
- Chelaria triannulata Meyrick, 1911

Species of moth

Hypatima triannulata is a moth in the family Gelechiidae. It was described by Edward Meyrick in 1911. It is found in Cameroon, Kenya, Mozambique and the South African provinces of Limpopo, Mpumalanga, Gauteng and Eastern Cape.

The wingspan is about 9 mm. The forewings are whitish ochreous somewhat mixed with pale ochreous and slightly sprinkled with grey. The costal edge is suffused with blackish irroration (sprinkles) from the base to two-thirds, with a flattened-triangular blackish spot in the middle of the costa. There is a black dot beneath the costa near the base and the stigmata are black, the discal remote, the plical obliquely before the first discal. There is also a blackish spot on the dorsum before the tornus, connected with the second discal stigma by a short outwardly oblique streak of blackish irroration. There are some groups of a few blackish scales around the posterior part of the costa and termen. The hindwings grey, paler and thinly scaled anteriorly.
