= Hypatima improba =

Scientific classification
- Domain: Eukaryota
- Kingdom: Animalia
- Phylum: Arthropoda
- Class: Insecta
- Order: Lepidoptera
- Family: Gelechiidae
- Genus: Hypatima
- Species: H. improba

Binomial name
- Hypatima improba (Meyrick, 1913)

Synonyms
- Chelaria improba Meyrick, 1913

Species of moth

Hypatima improba is a moth in the family Gelechiidae. It was described by Edward Meyrick in 1913. It is found in Mpumalanga, South Africa.

The wingspan is about 13 mm. The forewings are light brownish, suffusedly mixed with grey and the base narrowly dark grey sprinkled with black, dilated towards the costa. There is a triangular patch of blackish suffusion extending on the costa from one-fourth to the middle and reaching two-thirds of the way across the wing. Two superimposed incomplete rings of black scales are found in the disc at three-fourths, the upper very indistinct and there is also a series of small indistinct spots of blackish irroration (sprinkles) around the posterior part of the costa and termen. The hindwings are grey.
