= Dactylethrella tetrametra =

Scientific classification
- Domain: Eukaryota
- Kingdom: Animalia
- Phylum: Arthropoda
- Class: Insecta
- Order: Lepidoptera
- Family: Gelechiidae
- Genus: Dactylethrella
- Species: D. tetrametra

Binomial name
- Dactylethrella tetrametra (Meyrick, 1913)

Synonyms
- Nothris tetrametra Meyrick, 1913

Species of moth

Dactylethrella tetrametra is a moth in the family Gelechiidae. It was described by Edward Meyrick in 1913. It is found in Mpumalanga, South Africa and Réunion.

The wingspan is 9–11 mm. The forewings are pale yellow ochreous, irregularly suffused or marbled with whitish, sprinkled or finely irrorated (sprinkled) with fuscous and with four short oblique black marks on the costa from one-fifth to two-thirds. There is a black dot towards the costa near the base and a blackish dot beneath the fold at one-fifth. The stigmata is small and black, with the plical rather obliquely before the first discal. There is a small black dot above the dorsum before the tornus and there are several minute scattered black dots in the apical area. The hindwings are grey.
