= Hypatima tonsa =

Scientific classification
- Domain: Eukaryota
- Kingdom: Animalia
- Phylum: Arthropoda
- Class: Insecta
- Order: Lepidoptera
- Family: Gelechiidae
- Genus: Hypatima
- Species: H. tonsa

Binomial name
- Hypatima tonsa (Meyrick, 1913)

Synonyms
- Chelaria tonsa Meyrick, 1913

Species of moth

Hypatima tonsa is a moth in the family Gelechiidae. It was described by Edward Meyrick in 1913. It is found in Vietnam and Assam, India.

The wingspan is 14–15 mm. The forewings are light brownish, faintly purplish tinged, sprinkled with fuscous and with a dark purplish-fuscous triangular blotch with indigo-blue reflections occupying nearly the median third of the costa, reaching more than halfway across the wing, edged anteriorly with whitish-ochreous suffusion. There is a small blackish dot on the fold at one-third of the wing, one towards the dorsum beyond this, one below the middle at two-thirds, and one obliquely beyond and above this. Some minute ill-defined blackish dots are found around the posterior part of the costa and termen. The hindwings are grey, paler and thinly scaled anteriorly.
