= Dactylethrella siccifolii =

Scientific classification
- Domain: Eukaryota
- Kingdom: Animalia
- Phylum: Arthropoda
- Class: Insecta
- Order: Lepidoptera
- Family: Gelechiidae
- Genus: Dactylethrella
- Species: D. siccifolii

Binomial name
- Dactylethrella siccifolii (Walsingham, 1881)

Synonyms
- Ypsolophus siccifolii Walsingham, 1881; Dactylethra siccifolii (Walsingham, 1881)

Species of moth

Dactylethrella siccifolii is a moth in the family Gelechiidae. It was described by Thomas de Grey, 6th Baron Walsingham, in 1881. It is found in South Africa (KwaZulu-Natal, Mpumalanga, Limpopo).

The wingspan is about 25 mm. The forewings are cinereous bone-colour, more or less irrorated and suffused with ochreous fawn-colour, especially on the upper and outer half of the wing and with a few scattered dark purplish scales near the base of the costal margin, and two rounded groups of dark purplish scales on the disc, one before and one beyond the middle. There are some shining whitish oblique streaks on the outer half of the costa, and a bright shining silvery metallic line along the apical margin. The hindwings are pale bone-colour.
