= Hypatima tricosma =

Scientific classification
- Domain: Eukaryota
- Kingdom: Animalia
- Phylum: Arthropoda
- Class: Insecta
- Order: Lepidoptera
- Family: Gelechiidae
- Genus: Hypatima
- Species: H. tricosma

Binomial name
- Hypatima tricosma (Meyrick, 1933)

Synonyms
- Chelaria tricosma Meyrick, 1933

Species of moth

Hypatima tricosma is a moth in the family Gelechiidae. It was described by Edward Meyrick in 1933. It is found in Malaysia.
