= Hypatima excellentella =

Scientific classification
- Domain: Eukaryota
- Kingdom: Animalia
- Phylum: Arthropoda
- Class: Insecta
- Order: Lepidoptera
- Family: Gelechiidae
- Genus: Hypatima
- Species: H. excellentella

Binomial name
- Hypatima excellentella Ponomarenko, 1991

Species of insect

Hypatima excellentella is a moth in the family Gelechiidae. It was described by Ponomarenko in 1991. It is found in the Russian Far East, Korea, Japan and Taiwan.

The wingspan is about 13 mm.

The larvae feed on Quercus mongolica.
