= Hypatima mancipata =

Scientific classification
- Kingdom: Animalia
- Phylum: Arthropoda
- Clade: Pancrustacea
- Class: Insecta
- Order: Lepidoptera
- Family: Gelechiidae
- Genus: Hypatima
- Species: H. mancipata

Binomial name
- Hypatima mancipata (Meyrick, 1913)

Synonyms
- Chelaria mancipata Meyrick, 1913

Species of moth

Hypatima mancipata is a moth in the family Gelechiidae. It was described by Edward Meyrick in 1913. It is found in Mpumalanga, South Africa.

The wingspan is about 13 mm. The forewings are grey, irregularly sprinkled with whitish, with scattered marks of black irroation (sprinkles) and a black dot beneath the costa near the base. There is a small dark fuscous semi-oval spot on the costa at one-fourth, and another smaller beyond it. An elongate dark grey spot is found on the middle of the costa and there is an elongate black mark edged with whitish on the fold before the middle, and between this and the median costal spot is an irregular elongate whitish ring. There is also a whitish ring in the disc at three-fourths, open beneath and its broken ends terminated with black scales. The hindwings are grey, paler and thinly scaled anteriorly.
