= Hypatima harpophora =

Scientific classification
- Domain: Eukaryota
- Kingdom: Animalia
- Phylum: Arthropoda
- Class: Insecta
- Order: Lepidoptera
- Family: Gelechiidae
- Genus: Hypatima
- Species: H. harpophora

Binomial name
- Hypatima harpophora (Meyrick, 1921)

Synonyms
- Chelaria harpophora Meyrick, 1921

Species of moth

Hypatima harpophora is a moth in the family Gelechiidae. It was described by Edward Meyrick in 1921. It is found in Australia, where it has been recorded from Queensland.

The wingspan is 10–11 mm. The forewings are grey suffusedly irrorated (sprinkled) with whitish and with a small elongate blackish spot on the costa somewhat before the middle, margined beneath with ochreous, two slight blackish marks on the costa before this and two beyond it, the plical stigma is small, blackish, with the second discal represented by a fine black longitudinal strigula. There are several small scattered obscure spots of fuscous suffusion, and some general fuscous clouding on the apical area. The hindwings of the males are subhyaline (almost glass like) violet whitish, with the margins light grey. Females have pale violet-grey hindwings with grey margins grey.
