= Hypatima nigrogrisea =

Scientific classification
- Domain: Eukaryota
- Kingdom: Animalia
- Phylum: Arthropoda
- Class: Insecta
- Order: Lepidoptera
- Family: Gelechiidae
- Genus: Hypatima
- Species: H. nigrogrisea

Binomial name
- Hypatima nigrogrisea Janse, 1949

Species of moth

Hypatima nigrogrisea is a moth in the family Gelechiidae. It was described by Anthonie Johannes Theodorus Janse in 1949. It is found in South Africa (KwaZulu-Natal, North-West Province) and Zimbabwe.
