= Hypatima albogrisea =

Scientific classification
- Domain: Eukaryota
- Kingdom: Animalia
- Phylum: Arthropoda
- Class: Insecta
- Order: Lepidoptera
- Family: Gelechiidae
- Genus: Hypatima
- Species: H. albogrisea

Binomial name
- Hypatima albogrisea (Walsingham, 1881)

Synonyms
- Chelaria albogrisea Walsingham, 1881

Species of moth

Hypatima albogrisea is a moth in the family Gelechiidae. It was described by Thomas de Grey, 6th Baron Walsingham, in 1881. It is found in South Africa (KwaZulu-Natal, Mpumalanga).

The wingspan is about 21 mm. The forewings are whitish grey, with a slight pinkish tinge, irrorated with brownish fuscous scales, and with a few single widely scattered steel-blue metallic scales chiefly about the darker markings. A somewhat quadrangular fuscous spot lies scarcely above the middle of the wing, the costa above it slightly shaded. There is a costal blotch of about the same size before the apex, and a smaller spot between the two. Both of the same colour. The apical margin is also narrowly fuscous. The hindwings are cinereous-fuscous, with a narrow semi-transparent steel-blue streak beneath the costal vein, and a tuft of long cinereous-fuscous scales arising from the base of the dorsal vein.
