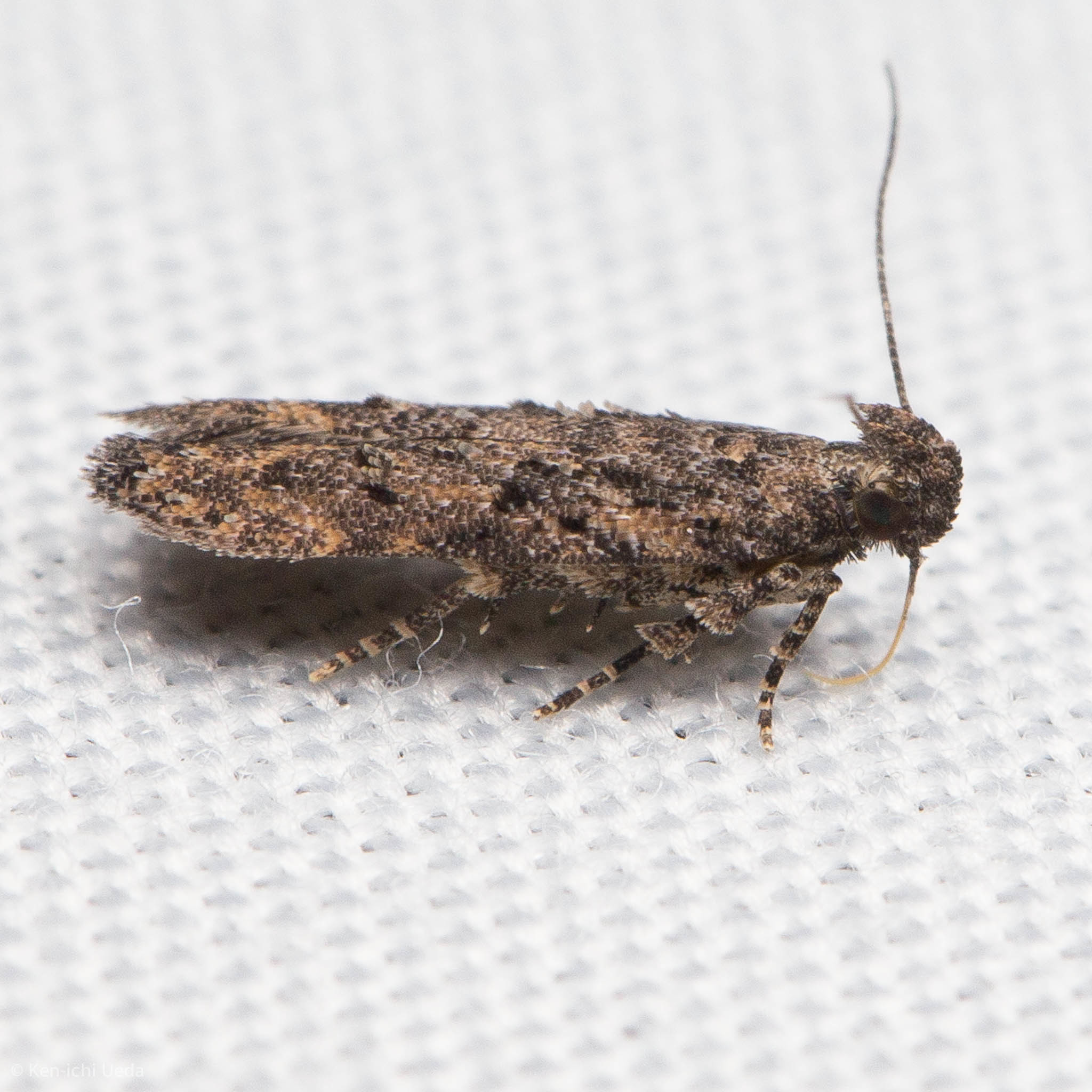
- Hypatima zesticopa, Texas

Scientific classification
- Domain: Eukaryota
- Kingdom: Animalia
- Phylum: Arthropoda
- Class: Insecta
- Order: Lepidoptera
- Family: Gelechiidae
- Genus: Hypatima
- Species: H. zesticopa

Binomial name
- Hypatima zesticopa (Meyrick, 1929)

Synonyms
- Chelaria zesticopa Meyrick, 1929

= Hypatima zesticopa =

Species of moth

Hypatima zesticopa is a moth in the family Gelechiidae. It was described by Edward Meyrick in 1929. It is found in North America, where it has been recorded from Texas, New Mexico, and Arizona.
