= Hypatima probolaea =

Scientific classification
- Domain: Eukaryota
- Kingdom: Animalia
- Phylum: Arthropoda
- Class: Insecta
- Order: Lepidoptera
- Family: Gelechiidae
- Genus: Hypatima
- Species: H. probolaea

Binomial name
- Hypatima probolaea (Meyrick, 1913)

Synonyms
- Chelaria probolaea Meyrick, 1913

Species of moth

Hypatima probolaea is a species of moth in the family Gelechiidae. It was described by Edward Meyrick in 1913. It is found in Mpumalanga, South Africa.

The wingspan is about 16 mm. The forewings are pale brownish, with some scattered dark fuscous scales and a blackish streak beneath the costa from the base to two-fifths, as well as a blackish line along the fold from the base to an elongate dark fuscous partially white-edged spot representing the plical stigma, its basal portion traversing a larger dark fuscous spot. A blackish line is found from above the plical stigma through the middle of the disc to the apex, interrupted beyond two-thirds by an irregular dark fuscous spot edged laterally with whitish, and also obliquely cut with whitish in the middle. There is an undefined narrow patch of dark fuscous suffusion extending along the median third of the costa, terminated with whitish and also a streak of blackish suffusion from beneath the extremity of this to the costa before the apex. The hindwings are dark grey, anteriorly with hyaline (glass-like) spaces between the veins.
