= Hypatima euchorda =

Scientific classification
- Domain: Eukaryota
- Kingdom: Animalia
- Phylum: Arthropoda
- Class: Insecta
- Order: Lepidoptera
- Family: Gelechiidae
- Genus: Hypatima
- Species: H. euchorda

Binomial name
- Hypatima euchorda (Meyrick, 1923)

Synonyms
- Chelaria euchorda Meyrick, 1923

Species of moth

Hypatima euchorda is a moth in the family Gelechiidae. It was described by Edward Meyrick in 1923. It is found in Pará, Brazil.

The wingspan is 11–12 mm. The forewings are fuscous, with some scattered blackish scales and with a suffused blackish-fuscous longitudinal streak from before the middle of the disc to the termen. There are raised tufts on the fold before the middle and near the tornus, and there is some blackish-fuscous irroration (sprinkles) on the fold between these. The hindwings are dark grey.
