= Hypatima mangiferae =

Scientific classification
- Kingdom: Animalia
- Phylum: Arthropoda
- Class: Insecta
- Order: Lepidoptera
- Family: Gelechiidae
- Genus: Hypatima
- Species: H. mangiferae

Binomial name
- Hypatima mangiferae Sattler, 1989

Species of moth

Hypatima mangiferae is a moth in the family Gelechiidae. It was described by Sattler in 1989. It is found in Kenya.

The larvae feed on Mangifera indica.
