= Hypatima arignota =

Scientific classification
- Domain: Eukaryota
- Kingdom: Animalia
- Phylum: Arthropoda
- Class: Insecta
- Order: Lepidoptera
- Family: Gelechiidae
- Genus: Hypatima
- Species: H. arignota

Binomial name
- Hypatima arignota (Meyrick, 1916)

Synonyms
- Chelaria arignota Meyrick, 1916; Chelaria obtruncata Meyrick, 1923; Hypatima obtruncata

Species of moth

Hypatima arignota is a moth in the family Gelechiidae. It was described by Edward Meyrick in 1916. It is found in the Indian state of Assam, Myanmar, Thailand and possibly Taiwan.

The wingspan is about 13 mm. The forewings are ochreous white, on the dorsal half irregularly tinged or sprinkled with light greyish and with a black mark on the base of the costa, and a dot towards the base above the middle. A triangular blackish blotch extends on the costa from one-fourth to three-fourths and reaches more than halfway across the wing, both the costal angles are cut off by fine white strigulae, from its posterior angle a straight light greyish-ochreous streak runs near the costa to the apex, edged above on its median portion by an elongate black costal mark. There are two minute black specks longitudinally placed in the disc beyond the apex of the costal blotch and a short black subapical dash edged above with white. The hindwings are grey, thinly scaled anteriorly and prismatic hyaline near the base.
