= Hypatima xylotechna =

Scientific classification
- Domain: Eukaryota
- Kingdom: Animalia
- Phylum: Arthropoda
- Class: Insecta
- Order: Lepidoptera
- Family: Gelechiidae
- Genus: Hypatima
- Species: H. xylotechna

Binomial name
- Hypatima xylotechna (Meyrick, 1932)

Synonyms
- Chelaria xylotechna Meyrick, 1932

Species of moth

Hypatima xylotechna is a moth in the family Gelechiidae. It was described by Edward Meyrick in 1932. It is found on Java in Indonesia.
