= Dactylethrella incondita =

Scientific classification
- Domain: Eukaryota
- Kingdom: Animalia
- Phylum: Arthropoda
- Class: Insecta
- Order: Lepidoptera
- Family: Gelechiidae
- Genus: Dactylethrella
- Species: D. incondita

Binomial name
- Dactylethrella incondita (Meyrick, 1913)

Synonyms
- Nothris incondita Meyrick, 1913

Species of moth

Dactylethrella incondita is a moth in the family Gelechiidae. It was described by Edward Meyrick in 1913. It is found in Sri Lanka.

The wingspan is 14–18 mm. The forewings are whitish, irregularly sprinkled with blackish scales, the veins streaked obscurely with pale ochreous. There is a black dot towards the costa near the base. The stigmata are obscurely indicated by some irregular grey markings which are variable and undefined. The plical is located beneath the first discal and the apical area is clouded with grey. There are several very small dark grey marks on the costa posteriorly. The hindwings are ochreous whitish.
