= Hypatima haligramma =

Scientific classification
- Domain: Eukaryota
- Kingdom: Animalia
- Phylum: Arthropoda
- Class: Insecta
- Order: Lepidoptera
- Family: Gelechiidae
- Genus: Hypatima
- Species: H. haligramma

Binomial name
- Hypatima haligramma (Meyrick, 1926)

Synonyms
- Chelaria haligramma Meyrick, 1926

Species of moth

Hypatima haligramma is a moth in the family Gelechiidae. It was described by Edward Meyrick in 1926. It is found in southern India and Thailand.

The wingspan is 10–11 mm. The forewings are grey, whitish speckled and with a very oblique black rhomboidal blotch from the middle of the costa, closely preceded by two black strigulae finely separated with white speckling and margined posteriorly with fine white speckling. There is a narrow semi-oval black spot on the costa towards the apex, preceded by a black strigula separated by fine white speckling, between this and preceding the ground colour tinged ochreous and becoming clear brownish ochreous beneath it to apex. A black white-edged dash is found beneath the apex and there is a fine marginal line of black and white speckling around the apex and termen. The hindwings are grey, thinly scaled and subhyaline (almost glass like) anteriorly.

The larvae feed on the flowers of Anacardium occidentale.
