= Hypatima parichniota =

Scientific classification
- Domain: Eukaryota
- Kingdom: Animalia
- Phylum: Arthropoda
- Class: Insecta
- Order: Lepidoptera
- Family: Gelechiidae
- Genus: Hypatima
- Species: H. parichniota

Binomial name
- Hypatima parichniota (Meyrick, 1938)

Synonyms
- Chelaria parichniota Meyrick, 1938

Species of moth

Hypatima parichniota is a moth in the family Gelechiidae. It was described by Edward Meyrick in 1938. It is found in Yunnan, China.
