= Hypatima indica =

Scientific classification
- Domain: Eukaryota
- Kingdom: Animalia
- Phylum: Arthropoda
- Class: Insecta
- Order: Lepidoptera
- Family: Gelechiidae
- Genus: Hypatima
- Species: H. indica

Binomial name
- Hypatima indica (Swinhoe, 1885)

Synonyms
- Gelechia indica Swinhoe, 1885

Species of moth

Hypatima indica is a moth in the family Gelechiidae. It was described by Charles Swinhoe in 1885. It is found in southern India.

The wingspan is about 15 mm. The forewings are fawn-coloured at the base and along the dorsal margins, slightly mottled towards the apex with darker shading. A large diffuse fuscous costal blotch stretches from the basal third of the wing nearly to the apex and contains a few raised fuscous scales, especially towards its inner margin, it is interrupted on the costa beyond the middle by an elongated narrow cinereous space. The hindwings are purplish iridescent along their central space, where the scales are very thin, but brownish around the margins, which are more thickly covered.
