= Hypatima verticosa =

Scientific classification
- Domain: Eukaryota
- Kingdom: Animalia
- Phylum: Arthropoda
- Class: Insecta
- Order: Lepidoptera
- Family: Gelechiidae
- Genus: Hypatima
- Species: H. verticosa

Binomial name
- Hypatima verticosa (Meyrick, 1913)

Synonyms
- Chelaria verticosa Meyrick, 1913

Species of moth

Hypatima verticosa is a moth in the family Gelechiidae. It was described by Edward Meyrick in 1913. It is found in southern India.

The wingspan is about 14 mm. The forewings are ochreous whitish, irrorated (sprinkled) with light brownish and fuscous and with a black white-circled dot near the base above the middle and a blackish white-edged triangular patch occupying more than the median third of the costa, its costal extremities cut off by a line oblique white strigulae, the apex truncate and reaching halfway across the wing. A black elongate mark rests on the termen beneath the apex. The hindwings are grey, thinly scaled and subhyaline (almost glass like) anteriorly, with the veins and termen suffused with dark fuscous.
