= Hypatima demonstrata =

Scientific classification
- Domain: Eukaryota
- Kingdom: Animalia
- Phylum: Arthropoda
- Class: Insecta
- Order: Lepidoptera
- Family: Gelechiidae
- Genus: Hypatima
- Species: H. demonstrata

Binomial name
- Hypatima demonstrata (Meyrick, 1920)

Synonyms
- Chelaria demonstrata Meyrick, 1920

Species of moth

Hypatima demonstrata is a moth in the family Gelechiidae. It was described by Edward Meyrick in 1920. It is found on New Guinea, where it has been recorded from the Kei Islands.

The wingspan is about 13 mm. The forewings are pale fuscous speckled with whitish, somewhat sprinkled darker fuscous and with a large dark fuscous rounded-triangular blotch on the middle of the costa, reaching more than halfway across the wing. There is a slight dark fuscous strigula beneath the costa at two-thirds. The hindwings are violet blue hyaline, with the veins and termen irregularly suffused with grey and the apical third grey.
