= Dactylethrella chionitis =

Scientific classification
- Domain: Eukaryota
- Kingdom: Animalia
- Phylum: Arthropoda
- Class: Insecta
- Order: Lepidoptera
- Family: Gelechiidae
- Genus: Dactylethrella
- Species: D. chionitis

Binomial name
- Dactylethrella chionitis (Meyrick, 1910)

Synonyms
- Nothris chionitis Meyrick, 1910

Species of moth

Dactylethrella chionitis is a moth in the family Gelechiidae. It was described by Edward Meyrick in 1910. It is found in the South African provinces of Mpumalanga, KwaZulu-Natal, Gauteng and Limpopo.

The wingspan is about 17 mm. The forewings are white, becoming pale greyish ochreous posteriorly, with a few fine scattered black scales, towards the apex and termen sprinkled with grey. The posterior half of the costa has short oblique alternate strigulae of grey suffusion and white and there is a fine white terminal line edged anteriorly by a row of black dots preceded by fuscous suffusion. The hindwings are whitish.
