= Hypatima orthostathma =

Scientific classification
- Domain: Eukaryota
- Kingdom: Animalia
- Phylum: Arthropoda
- Class: Insecta
- Order: Lepidoptera
- Family: Gelechiidae
- Genus: Hypatima
- Species: H. orthostathma

Binomial name
- Hypatima orthostathma (Meyrick, 1921)

Synonyms
- Chelaria orthostathma Meyrick, 1921

Species of moth

Hypatima orthostathma is a moth in the family Gelechiidae. It was described by Edward Meyrick in 1921. It is found in Australia, where it has been recorded from Queensland.

The wingspan is about 9 mm. The forewings are grey, closely, and suffusedly irrorated (sprinkled) with white, slightly tinged yellowish in places, and with a brownish streak along the basal fourth of the costa with some blackish scales. There is a black dot on the dorsum at one-fourth and a semi-oval blackish spot in the middle of the costa preceded and followed by slight blackish marks. There is also a direct transverse blackish fasciate streak from the dorsum beneath this, not reaching it, and a small dark grey spot on the costa at two-thirds, a black longitudinal, sometimes interrupted, strigula in the disc at three-fourths and some greyish suffusion towards the termen, and two or three slight blackish marks. The hindwings are light grey.
