= Hypatima sublectella =

Scientific classification
- Kingdom: Animalia
- Phylum: Arthropoda
- Class: Insecta
- Order: Lepidoptera
- Family: Gelechiidae
- Genus: Hypatima
- Species: H. sublectella

Binomial name
- Hypatima sublectella (Walker, 1864)

Synonyms
- Gelechia sublectella Walker, 1864

Species of moth

Hypatima sublectella is a moth in the family Gelechiidae. It was described by Francis Walker in 1864. It is found on Borneo.

Adults are dull ochraceous, the forewings with several black points, which are mostly on the costa. There are two irregular blackish bands, one near the base, the other exterior. The hindwings are cinereous.
