= Hypatima tessulata =

Scientific classification
- Domain: Eukaryota
- Kingdom: Animalia
- Phylum: Arthropoda
- Class: Insecta
- Order: Lepidoptera
- Family: Gelechiidae
- Genus: Hypatima
- Species: H. tessulata

Binomial name
- Hypatima tessulata (Meyrick, 1921)

Synonyms
- Chelaria tessulata Meyrick, 1921

Species of moth

Hypatima tessulata is a moth in the family Gelechiidae. It was described by Edward Meyrick in 1921. It is found in Australia, where it has been recorded from Queensland.

The wingspan is about 10 mm. The forewings are light fuscous, closely irrorated (sprinkled) with whitish and with rather dark fuscous semi-oval spots on the costa at one-fourth and the middle. Smaller similar spots are located before and between these, and two beyond the second. There is a dark fuscous longitudinal striga beneath the costa towards the base. The plical and second discal stigmata are dark fuscous and there is some irregular fuscous clouding in the disc posteriorly and towards the apex. The hindwings are grey, paler and thinly scaled towards the base.
