= Hypatima microgramma =

Scientific classification
- Domain: Eukaryota
- Kingdom: Animalia
- Phylum: Arthropoda
- Class: Insecta
- Order: Lepidoptera
- Family: Gelechiidae
- Genus: Hypatima
- Species: H. microgramma

Binomial name
- Hypatima microgramma (Meyrick, 1920)

Synonyms
- Chelaria microgramma Meyrick, 1920

Species of moth

Hypatima microgramma is a moth in the family Gelechiidae. It was described by Edward Meyrick in 1920. It is found in Australia, where it has been recorded from New South Wales.

The wingspan is 13–14 mm. The forewings are grey, closely and suffusedly irrorated (sprinkled) with white and with a white tuft on the costa at one-fourth, preceded by a small ochreous spot with some fuscous suffusion. There is an elongate or narrow semi-oval fuscous spot along the costa in the middle and short fine black dashes indicating the stigmata, with the plical rather obliquely before the first discal, the first discal sometimes edged above with slight brownish suffusion. There are similar fine black dashes between the second discal and the termen, and on the fold near the extremity. There are also indications of small obscure darker marginal spots around the posterior part of the costa and termen. The hindwings are light grey.
