= Hypatima scotia =

Scientific classification
- Domain: Eukaryota
- Kingdom: Animalia
- Phylum: Arthropoda
- Class: Insecta
- Order: Lepidoptera
- Family: Gelechiidae
- Genus: Hypatima
- Species: H. scotia

Binomial name
- Hypatima scotia (Turner, 1919)

Synonyms
- Cymatomorpha scotia Turner, 1919

Species of moth

Hypatima scotia is a moth in the family Gelechiidae. It was described by Alfred Jefferis Turner in 1919. It is found in Australia, where it has been recorded from Queensland.

The wingspan is about 12 mm. The forewings are ochreous-whitish, uniformly suffused with fuscous and with several tufts of raised scales on or near the costa, one especially large at one-third. The hindwings are grey.
