= Hypatima toreuta =

Scientific classification
- Domain: Eukaryota
- Kingdom: Animalia
- Phylum: Arthropoda
- Class: Insecta
- Order: Lepidoptera
- Family: Gelechiidae
- Genus: Hypatima
- Species: H. toreuta

Binomial name
- Hypatima toreuta (Turner, 1919)

Synonyms
- Episacta toreuta Turner, 1919

Species of moth

Hypatima toreuta is a moth in the family Gelechiidae. It was described by Alfred Jefferis Turner in 1919. It is found in Australia, where it has been recorded from Queensland.

The wingspan is around 14mm. The forewings are whitish, the markings and some scattered irroration fuscous. There is a small tuft of whitish scales on the costa at three-fourths and several tufts of raised scales towards the base, two of them larger, the first above the fold at one-fourth, the second beneath the fold beyond the first. A triangular blotch is found on the costa from one-fifth to three-fifths, its apex reaching to the fold. There is also a spot on the termen beyond the tornus, as well as an ill-defined subapical suffusion and a line of indistinct dots before and parallel to the termen. The hindwings are pale-grey, becoming whitish towards the base.
