= Hypatima agriogramma =

Scientific classification
- Domain: Eukaryota
- Kingdom: Animalia
- Phylum: Arthropoda
- Class: Insecta
- Order: Lepidoptera
- Family: Gelechiidae
- Genus: Hypatima
- Species: H. agriogramma

Binomial name
- Hypatima agriogramma (Meyrick, 1926)

Synonyms
- Chelaria agriogramma Meyrick, 1926

Species of moth

Hypatima agriogramma is a moth in the family Gelechiidae. It was described by Edward Meyrick in 1926. It is found on Borneo.

The wingspan is about 18 millimetres (0.71 in). The forewings are whitish ochreous, with scattered brownish scales and three irregular black lines suffused with brown, one subcostal from the base to near the middle, one along the fold throughout and one from the disc before one-third to just below the apex, with a branch along vein nine. There is a suffused dark fuscous streak along the costa from one-fourth to three-fifths, cut by oblique whitish strigulae at one-third and beyond the middle. There is some irregular brownish suffusion towards the dorsum and termen and two oblique whitish strigulae from the costa posteriorly, edged with brown and separated by a brown stria running to the apex with a blackish dot towards the apex and a black linear apical dot. The hindwings are grey.
