= Hypatima ammonura =

Scientific classification
- Domain: Eukaryota
- Kingdom: Animalia
- Phylum: Arthropoda
- Class: Insecta
- Order: Lepidoptera
- Family: Gelechiidae
- Genus: Hypatima
- Species: H. ammonura

Binomial name
- Hypatima ammonura (Meyrick, 1921)

Synonyms
- Chelaria ammonura Meyrick, 1921

Species of moth

Hypatima ammonura is a moth in the family Gelechiidae. It was described by Edward Meyrick in 1921. It is found in Australia, where it has been recorded from Queensland.

The wingspan is 9–10 mm. The forewings are light fuscous, suffusedly irrorated (sprinkled) with whitish and with a small elongate spot of blackish irroration on the costa towards the base, suffused beneath with ochreous yellow. There is a similar larger spot on the costa before the middle, slight marks before and beyond this, and a small spot at two-thirds, irregular small black spots or five dashes representing the stigmata, variable in development, as well as a small blackish mark on the dorsum at one-fourth. There is also a small dark grey elongate spot on the tornus more or less indicated and sometimes some indistinct terminal dots. The hindwings of the males have the costal edge on the basal three-fifths folded over above and enclosing an ochreous-whitish hair-pencil. They are grey and thinly scaled anteriorly.
