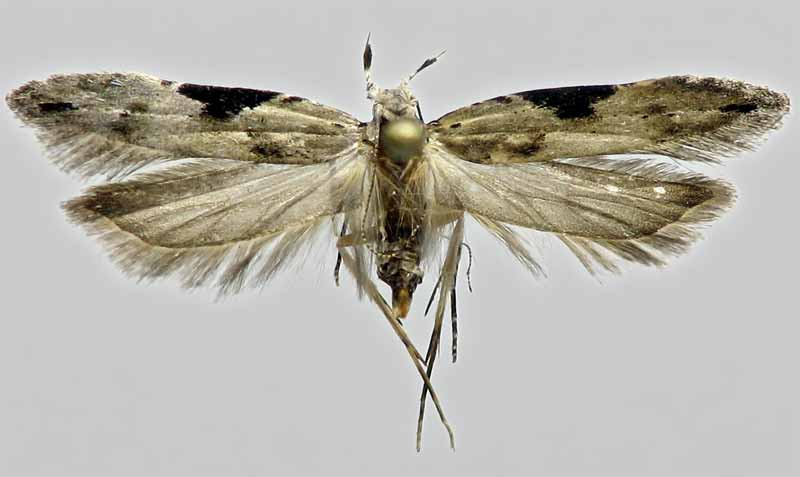

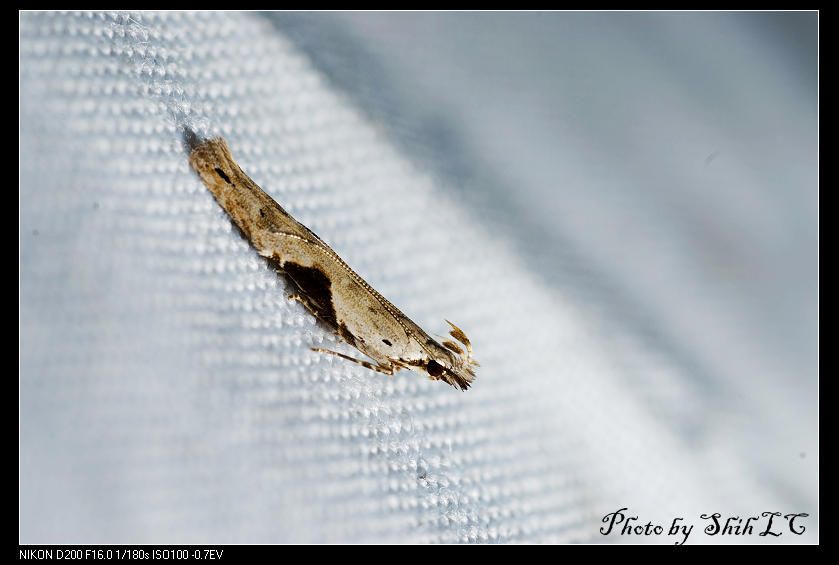

Scientific classification
- Kingdom: Animalia
- Phylum: Arthropoda
- Class: Insecta
- Order: Lepidoptera
- Family: Gelechiidae
- Genus: Hypatima
- Species: H. rhomboidella

Binomial name
- Hypatima rhomboidella (Linnaeus, 1758)

Synonyms
- Phalaena rhomboidella Linnaeus, 1758; Chelaria hübnerella Donovan, 1804; Tinea conscriptella Hübner, [1805]; Chelaria conscripta Haworth, 1828

= Hypatima rhomboidella =

Species of moth

The lobster-clawed moth (Hypatima rhomboidella) is a moth of the family Gelechiidae. It is found in most of Europe, except for the Iberian Peninsula and most of the Balkan Peninsula. In the east, the range extends to Siberia and Taiwan.

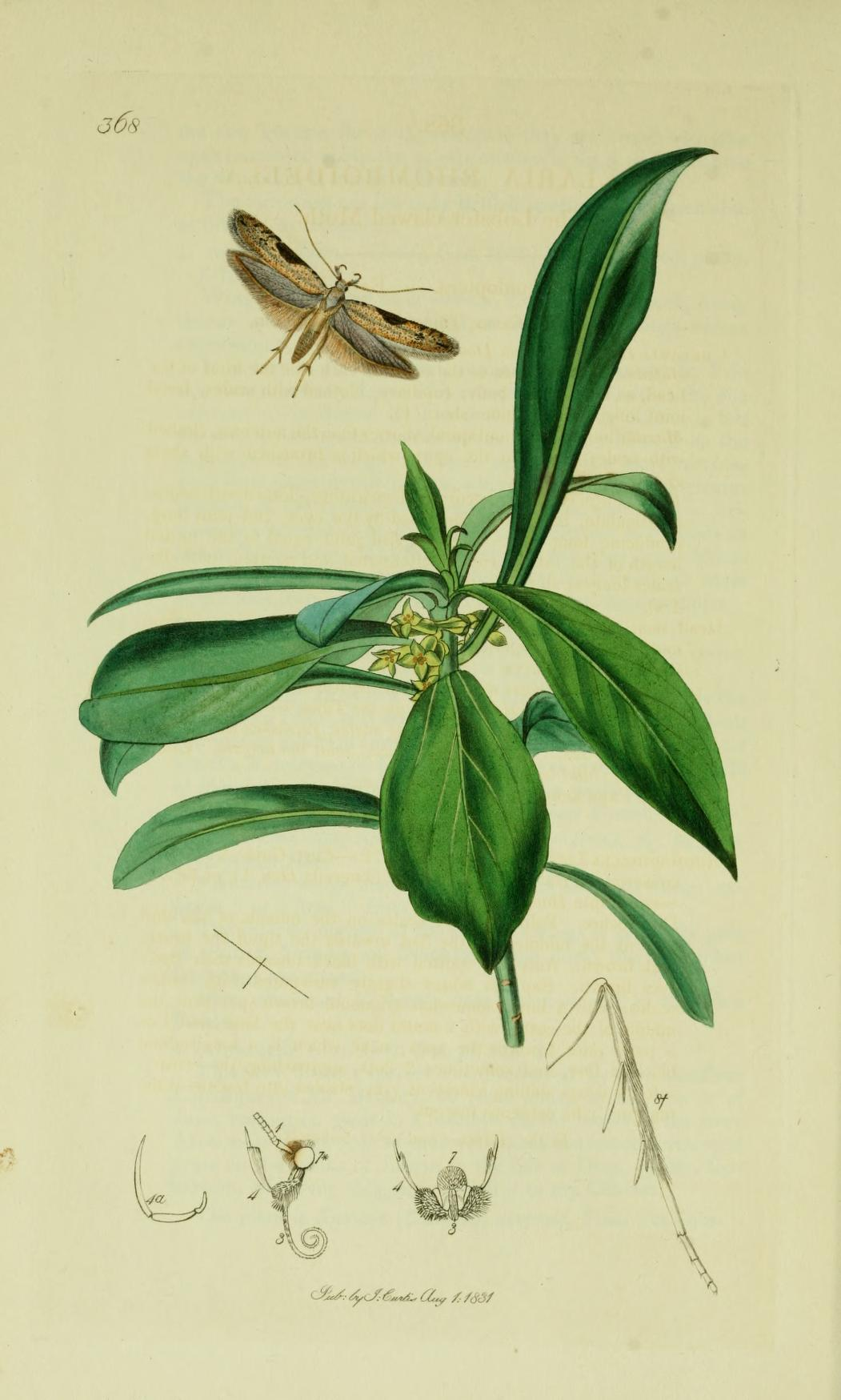
Illustration from John Curtis's British Entomology Volume 6

The wingspan is about 18 mm. The forewings are whitish-grey, sometimes sprinkled with dark grey, margins sometimes ochreous-tinged; usually a dark fuscous suffusion near dorsum towards base; costa marked with small blackish spots except towards base; a triangular blackish partly brown-edged costal blotch before middle; a dark grey tornal spot; a black dash on termen below apex. Hindwings are light grey. The larva is pinkish-brown; head and plate of 2 black. The wingspan is about 18 mm. The forewings are whitish-grey, sometimes sprinkled with dark grey, margins sometimes ochreous-tinged; usually a dark fuscous suffusion near dorsum towards base; costa marked with small blackish spots except towards base; a triangular blackish partly brown-edged costal blotch before middle; a dark grey tornal spot; a black dash on termen below apex. Hindwings are light grey. The larva is pinkish-brown; head and plate of 2 black.

Adults are on wing from late July and September.

The larvae feed on Betula and Corylus avellana.
