= Hypatima baliodes =

Scientific classification
- Domain: Eukaryota
- Kingdom: Animalia
- Phylum: Arthropoda
- Class: Insecta
- Order: Lepidoptera
- Family: Gelechiidae
- Genus: Hypatima
- Species: H. baliodes

Binomial name
- Hypatima baliodes (Lower, 1920)

Synonyms
- Chelaria baliodes Lower, 1920

Species of moth

Hypatima baliodes is a moth in the family Gelechiidae. It was described by Oswald Bertram Lower in 1920. It is found in Australia, where it has been recorded from New South Wales and Queensland.

The wingspan is about 16 mm. The forewings are ashy-grey whitish, more or less mixed throughout with small fuscous blotches. There are about nine small fuscous spots on the costa throughout, the first basal, becoming obliquely fascia like to the base of the dorsum and the third very distinct, continued obliquely inwards to the fold, more or less broken beneath the costa, broadest on the lower two-thirds. There are two or three short blackish dashes between this and the middle of the termen and one or two similar dashes on the fold beneath. A fine row of fuscous dots is found near and parallel to the termen. The hindwings are greyish, becoming fuscous tinged posteriorly.
