= Hypatima lecticata =

Scientific classification
- Domain: Eukaryota
- Kingdom: Animalia
- Phylum: Arthropoda
- Class: Insecta
- Order: Lepidoptera
- Family: Gelechiidae
- Genus: Hypatima
- Species: H. lecticata

Binomial name
- Hypatima lecticata (Meyrick, 1926)

Synonyms
- Chelaria lecticata Meyrick, 1926

Species of moth

Hypatima lecticata is a moth in the family Gelechiidae. It was described by Edward Meyrick in 1926. It is found in Mpumalanga, South Africa.

The wingspan is about 15 mm. The forewings are light grey suffusedly irrorated (sprinkled) with white with a small blackish spot on the base of the costa and a blackish dot in the disc near the base. There is a small raised cloudy dark grey spot on the costa at one-fifth, a semi-oval black spot before the middle, and three or four small cloudy dark grey spots posteriorly. A grey oblong patch irrorated with dark fuscous extends along the dorsum from one-third to near the tornus and reaches more than halfway across wing, preceded by whiter tufts and edged by a larger transverse tuft posteriorly, and connected with the base by a streak along the dorsum in which is a black streak. There is some irregular darker suffusion and raised scales posteriorly, and several short black linear marks near the margin around the apex. The hindwings are grey, darker towards the apex and termen, with an iridescent-blue-hyaline streak beneath the cell.
