= Hypatima silvestris =

Scientific classification
- Domain: Eukaryota
- Kingdom: Animalia
- Phylum: Arthropoda
- Class: Insecta
- Order: Lepidoptera
- Family: Gelechiidae
- Genus: Hypatima
- Species: H. silvestris

Binomial name
- Hypatima silvestris (Meyrick, 1913)

Synonyms
- Chelaria silvestris Meyrick, 1913

Species of moth

Hypatima silvestris is a moth in the family Gelechiidae. It was described by Edward Meyrick in 1913. It is found in Assam in India and Jiangsu in China.

The wingspan is 15–16 mm. The forewings are fuscous, irrorated (sprinkled) with whitish points and with two blackish dots towards the costa near the base and a dark fuscous triangular blotch occupying nearly the median third of the costa, reaching halfway across the wing, preceded on the costa by a small dark fuscous spot separated by a whitish strigula. The costa posteriorly is dark fuscous, with several fine whitish oblique strigulae and there is short black dash in the disc at four-fifths, one resting on the termen beneath the apex, and a minute one just above the tornus. The hindwings are grey, lighter and thinly scaled towards the base and with the veins darker.
