= Hypatima iophana =

Scientific classification
- Domain: Eukaryota
- Kingdom: Animalia
- Phylum: Arthropoda
- Class: Insecta
- Order: Lepidoptera
- Family: Gelechiidae
- Genus: Hypatima
- Species: H. iophana

Binomial name
- Hypatima iophana (Meyrick, 1913)

Synonyms
- Chelaria iophana Meyrick, 1913

Species of moth

Hypatima iophana is a moth in the family Gelechiidae. It was described by Edward Meyrick in 1913. It is found in Taiwan, Sri Lanka, Vietnam, Thailand and Java, Indonesia.

The wingspan is 14–16 mm. The forewings are brownish mixed with grey and raised whitish scales, strewn with irregular black longitudinal marks on the veins. There are some irregular tufts of scales, especially a large tuft in the disc at two-fifths. There is a triangular blackish blotch occupying the median third of the costa, and reaching two-thirds of the way across the wing. The hindwings are fuscous, thinly scaled and subhyaline (almost glass like) anteriorly, with strong violet-blue iridescence and with the veins, apical area, and termen suffused with dark fuscous.
