= Hypatima sphenophora =

Scientific classification
- Domain: Eukaryota
- Kingdom: Animalia
- Phylum: Arthropoda
- Class: Insecta
- Order: Lepidoptera
- Family: Gelechiidae
- Genus: Hypatima
- Species: H. sphenophora

Binomial name
- Hypatima sphenophora (Meyrick, 1904)

Synonyms
- Deuteroptila sphenophora Meyrick, 1904

Species of moth

Hypatima sphenophora is a moth in the family Gelechiidae. It was described by Edward Meyrick in 1904. It is found in Australia, where it has been recorded from Queensland.

The wingspan is 13–14 mm (0.51–0.55 in). The forewings are ochreous whitish irregularly irrorated (sprinkled) with fuscous and with a blackish dot at the base of the costa, and one beneath the costa near the base. There is an indistinct dark fuscous spot on the dorsum at one-fourth and a narrow elongate blackish-fuscous blotch along the costa from about one-fifth to two-thirds, the lower edge irregularly dilated above the middle of the disc. A small black dot is found on the fold beneath the dilation, and another near the tornus and there is a black streak in the disc from three-fifths to the apex, usually once or twice interrupted. The hindwings are fuscous, thinly scaled and semitransparent anteriorly.
