= Ethmiopsis prosectrix =

Scientific classification
- Domain: Eukaryota
- Kingdom: Animalia
- Phylum: Arthropoda
- Class: Insecta
- Order: Lepidoptera
- Family: Gelechiidae
- Genus: Ethmiopsis
- Species: E. prosectrix

Binomial name
- Ethmiopsis prosectrix Meyrick in Caradja & Meyrick, 1935

Synonyms
- Eudactylota prosectrix Meyrick, 1935

Species of moth

Ethmiopsis prosectrix is a moth in the family Gelechiidae. It was described by Edward Meyrick in 1935. It is found in China (Shanghai, Zhejiang).
