= Hypatima procax =

Scientific classification
- Domain: Eukaryota
- Kingdom: Animalia
- Phylum: Arthropoda
- Class: Insecta
- Order: Lepidoptera
- Family: Gelechiidae
- Genus: Hypatima
- Species: H. procax

Binomial name
- Hypatima procax (Meyrick, 1911)

Synonyms
- Allocota procax Meyrick, 1911

Species of moth

Hypatima procax is a moth in the family Gelechiidae. It was described by Edward Meyrick in 1911. It is found on the Seychelles, where it has been recorded from Aldabra, Mahé and Silhouette.

The wingspan is about 11 mm. The forewings are whitish, irrorated (sprinkled) with grey with a black linear dot beneath the costa near the base and a dark fuscous costal mark at one-fifth, a black subdorsal dot at one-fourth, and some indistinct grey markings between these, as well as some undefined fuscous suffusion in the middle of disc, around which are a blackish dot above the middle at two-fifths, a moderate dark fuscous spot on the middle of the costa, and an undefined streak of blackish scales along the fold beneath the middle. There are also two or three small dark fuscous spots on the costa beyond the middle and the terminal fourth is irregularly suffused with fuscous, with some blackish scales towards the tornus. The hindwings are grey.
