= Dactylethrella globulata =

Scientific classification
- Domain: Eukaryota
- Kingdom: Animalia
- Phylum: Arthropoda
- Class: Insecta
- Order: Lepidoptera
- Family: Gelechiidae
- Genus: Dactylethrella
- Species: D. globulata

Binomial name
- Dactylethrella globulata (Meyrick, 1910)

Synonyms
- Dactylethra globulata Meyrick, 1910

Species of moth

Dactylethrella globulata is a moth in the family Gelechiidae. It was described by Edward Meyrick in 1910. It is found in Sri Lanka.

The wingspan is 11–12 mm. The forewings are whitish, tinged with brownish and sprinkled with dark fuscous and with three moderately large roundish fuscous spots in the disc at one-fourth, halfway and at two-thirds, sprinkled with darker, the first smaller and less marked. There is a suffused similar patch extending along the termen. The hindwings are grey.
