= Hypatima dermatica =

Scientific classification
- Domain: Eukaryota
- Kingdom: Animalia
- Phylum: Arthropoda
- Class: Insecta
- Order: Lepidoptera
- Family: Gelechiidae
- Genus: Hypatima
- Species: H. dermatica

Binomial name
- Hypatima dermatica (Meyrick, 1921)

Synonyms
- Chelaria dermatica Meyrick, 1921

Species of moth

Hypatima dermatica is a moth in the family Gelechiidae. It was described by Edward Meyrick in 1921. It is found in Australia, where it has been recorded from Queensland.

The wingspan is about 16 mm. The forewings are brown, irregularly and suffusedly irrorated (sprinkled) with grey and with several obscure irregular transverse lines of whitish irroration, as well as an elongate black spot on the costa at about the middle, two slight dark fuscous marks preceding this, and a small spot beyond it. There is a narrow irregular somewhat interrupted black streak from the disc before the middle to the apex, beneath the costal spot edged above by a small elongate white spot. There is also a slender obscure blackish streak along the fold from near the base to beyond the middle, interrupted by whitish transverse lines. A dark fuscous irregular streak is found along the basal fourth of the dorsum. The hindwings are grey, lighter anteriorly.
