= Ethmiopsis melaina =

Scientific classification
- Domain: Eukaryota
- Kingdom: Animalia
- Phylum: Arthropoda
- Class: Insecta
- Order: Lepidoptera
- Family: Gelechiidae
- Genus: Ethmiopsis
- Species: E. melaina

Binomial name
- Ethmiopsis melaina (Clarke, 1986)

Synonyms
- Chelophoba melaina Clarke, 1986

Species of moth

Ethmiopsis melaina is a moth in the family Gelechiidae. It was described by Clarke in 1986. It is found on the Marquesas Archipelago.

The wingspan is about 10 mm. The basal half of the forewings is cinereous and the outer half sordid white. There are two or three fuscous blotches at the outer edge of the basal half and the outer half is strongly marked with fuscous and cinereous. The hindwings are very pale grey, whitish basally.
