= Encolapta subtegulifera =

Scientific classification
- Kingdom: Animalia
- Phylum: Arthropoda
- Clade: Pancrustacea
- Class: Insecta
- Order: Lepidoptera
- Family: Gelechiidae
- Genus: Encolapta
- Species: E. subtegulifera

Binomial name
- Encolapta subtegulifera (Ponomarenko, 1994)

Synonyms
- Dactylethrella subtegulifera Ponomarenko, 1994; Ethmiopsis subtegulifera (Ponomarenko, 1994)

Species of moth

Encolapta subtegulifera is a moth in the family Gelechiidae. It was described by Margarita Gennadievna Ponomarenko in 1994. It is found in the Russian Far East, Korea, China, and Japan.
