= Ethmiopsis catarina =

Scientific classification
- Kingdom: Animalia
- Phylum: Arthropoda
- Clade: Pancrustacea
- Class: Insecta
- Order: Lepidoptera
- Family: Gelechiidae
- Genus: Ethmiopsis
- Species: E. catarina

Binomial name
- Ethmiopsis catarina (Ponomarenko, 1994)

Synonyms
- Dactylethrella catarina Ponomarenko, 1994

Species of moth

Ethmiopsis catarina is a moth in the family Gelechiidae. It was described by Ponomarenko in 1994. It is found in the Russian Far East and Korea.
