= Ethmiopsis epichthonia =

Scientific classification
- Domain: Eukaryota
- Kingdom: Animalia
- Phylum: Arthropoda
- Class: Insecta
- Order: Lepidoptera
- Family: Gelechiidae
- Genus: Ethmiopsis
- Species: E. epichthonia

Binomial name
- Ethmiopsis epichthonia (Meyrick in Caradja & Meyrick, 1935)

Synonyms
- Homoshelas epichthonia Meyrick in Caradja & Meyrick, 1935; Encolapta epichthonia (Meyrick, 1935)

Species of moth

Ethmiopsis epichthonia is a moth in the family Gelechiidae. It was described by Edward Meyrick in 1935. It is found in Jiangsu, China, and possibly Taiwan.
