= Ethmiopsis tegulifera =

Scientific classification
- Domain: Eukaryota
- Kingdom: Animalia
- Phylum: Arthropoda
- Class: Insecta
- Order: Lepidoptera
- Family: Gelechiidae
- Genus: Ethmiopsis
- Species: E. tegulifera

Binomial name
- Ethmiopsis tegulifera (Meyrick, 1932)

Synonyms
- Dactylethra tegulifera Meyrick, 1932; Dactylethrella tegulifera Meyrick, 1932; Encolapta tegulifera (Meyrick, 1932)

Species of moth

Ethmiopsis tegulifera is a moth in the family Gelechiidae. It was described by Edward Meyrick in 1932. It is found in the Russian Far East (Ussuri), Korea and Japan.

The wingspan is 13–14.5 mm. The forewings are white. The hindwings are grey.

The larvae feed on Quercus mongolica and Quercus serrata.
