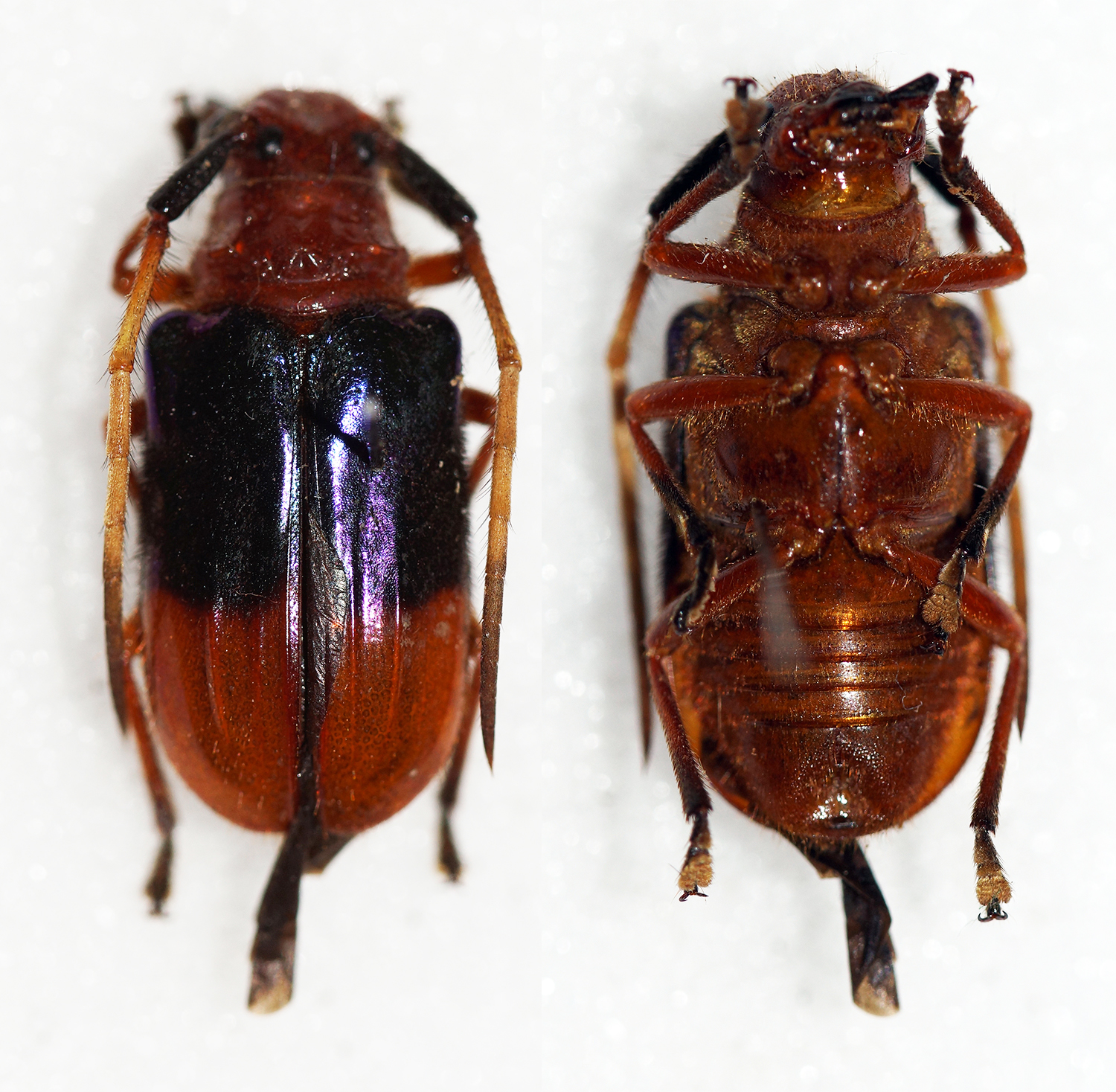
- Astathes levis

Scientific classification
- Domain: Eukaryota
- Kingdom: Animalia
- Phylum: Arthropoda
- Class: Insecta
- Order: Coleoptera
- Suborder: Polyphaga
- Infraorder: Cucujiformia
- Family: Cerambycidae
- Subfamily: Lamiinae
- Tribe: Astathini; Thomson, 1864

= Astathini =

Tribe of beetles

Astathini is a tribe of longhorn beetles of the subfamily Lamiinae. It was described by Thomson in 1864.

== Taxonomy ==
- Anastathes Gahan, 1901
- Astathes Newman, 1842
- Bacchisa Pascoe, 1866
- Chreomisis Breuning, 1956
- Cleonaria Thomson, 1864
- Eustathes Newman, 1842
- Hecphora Thomson, 1867
- Hispasthathes Breuning, 1956
- Lasiophrys Gahan, 1901
- Momisis Pascoe, 1867
- Mystacophorus Duvivier, 1891
- Ochrocesis Pascoe, 1867
- Parastathes Breuning, 1956
- Plaxomicrus Thomson, 1857
- Scapastathes Breuning, 1956
- Tropimetopa J. Thomson, 1864
