= A. leonensis =

A. leonensis may refer to:

- Abacetus leonensis, a ground beetle
- Afrithelphusa leonensis, a freshwater crab found in Guinea
- Astathes leonensis, a longhorn beetle found in Sierra Leone
