= Momisis submonticola =

Scientific classification
- Kingdom: Animalia
- Phylum: Arthropoda
- Class: Insecta
- Order: Coleoptera
- Suborder: Polyphaga
- Infraorder: Cucujiformia
- Family: Cerambycidae
- Genus: Momisis
- Species: M. submonticola

Binomial name
- Momisis submonticola Breuning, 1968

Species of beetle

Momisis submonticola is a species of beetle in the family Cerambycidae. It was described by Breuning in 1968. It is known from China and Laos.
