= Astathes distincta =

Scientific classification
- Domain: Eukaryota
- Kingdom: Animalia
- Phylum: Arthropoda
- Class: Insecta
- Order: Coleoptera
- Suborder: Polyphaga
- Infraorder: Cucujiformia
- Family: Cerambycidae
- Genus: Astathes
- Species: A. distincta

Binomial name
- Astathes distincta (Hintz, 1919)

Synonyms
- Ecphora distincta Hintz, 1919; Hecphora simplicicollis Aurivillius, 1920

Species of beetle

Astathes distincta is a species of beetle in the family Cerambycidae. It was described by Hintz in 1919. It is known from Cameroon and the Central African Republic.
