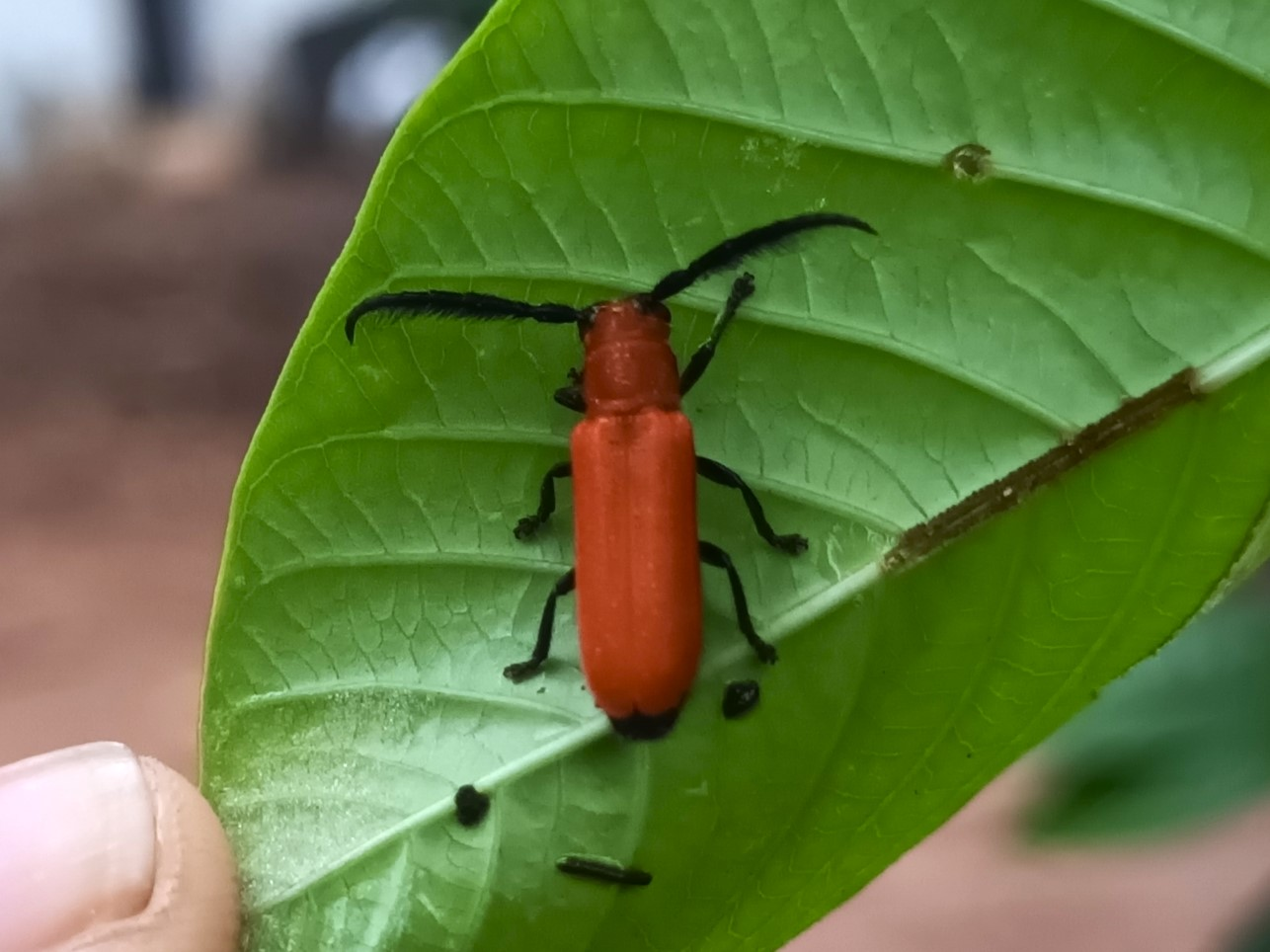

Scientific classification
- Domain: Eukaryota
- Kingdom: Animalia
- Phylum: Arthropoda
- Class: Insecta
- Order: Coleoptera
- Suborder: Polyphaga
- Infraorder: Cucujiformia
- Family: Cerambycidae
- Genus: Cleonaria
- Species: C. bicolor

Binomial name
- Cleonaria bicolor Thomson, 1864

= Cleonaria bicolor =

Species of beetle

Cleonaria bicolor is a species of beetle in the family Cerambycidae. It was described by James Thomson in 1864.

Cleonaria breed on species of Rubiaceae, particularly in the genus Ixora. Adults emerge and breed after the rains. Adults make incision on leaves while feeding and breed by laying eggs inside a hole made on the bark. The larvae have a diapause and pupate inside a burrow. A bethylid wasp parasitizes the larvae of the beetle in southern India.
