= Momisis nicobarica =

Scientific classification
- Domain: Eukaryota
- Kingdom: Animalia
- Phylum: Arthropoda
- Class: Insecta
- Order: Coleoptera
- Suborder: Polyphaga
- Infraorder: Cucujiformia
- Family: Cerambycidae
- Genus: Momisis
- Species: M. nicobarica

Binomial name
- Momisis nicobarica Gardner, 1936

Species of beetle

Momisis nicobarica is a species of beetle in the family Cerambycidae. It was described by Gardner in 1936. It is known from the Nicobar Islands.
