= Ochrocesis evanida =

Scientific classification
- Kingdom: Animalia
- Phylum: Arthropoda
- Class: Insecta
- Order: Coleoptera
- Suborder: Polyphaga
- Infraorder: Cucujiformia
- Family: Cerambycidae
- Genus: Ochrocesis
- Species: O. evanida

Binomial name
- Ochrocesis evanida Pascoe, 1867

Synonyms
- Ochrocesis sandakana Breuning, 1956

Species of beetle

Ochrocesis evanida is a species of beetle in the family Cerambycidae. It was described by Pascoe in 1867. It is known from Borneo and Malaysia. It contains the varietas Ochrocesis evanida m. nigroabdominalis.
