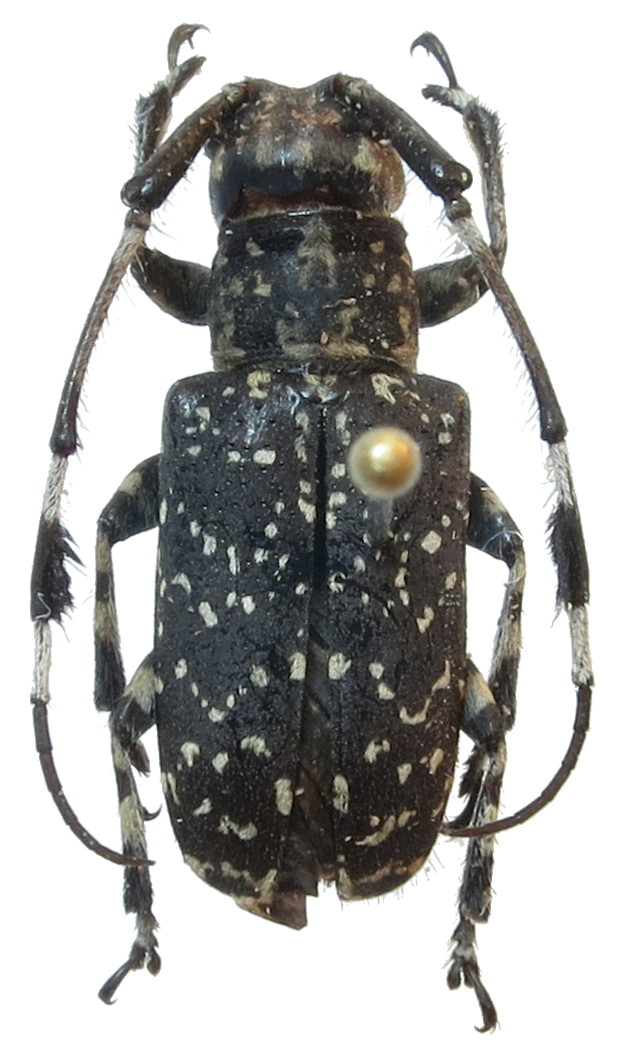
- A. perplexa from Philippines

Scientific classification
- Domain: Eukaryota
- Kingdom: Animalia
- Phylum: Arthropoda
- Class: Insecta
- Order: Coleoptera
- Suborder: Polyphaga
- Infraorder: Cucujiformia
- Family: Cerambycidae
- Genus: Astathes
- Species: A. perplexa

Binomial name
- Astathes perplexa Newman, 1842

Synonyms
- Astathes illigeri Thomson, 1865

= Astathes perplexa =

Species of beetle

Astathes perplexa is a species of beetle in the family Cerambycidae. It was described by Newman in 1842. It is known from the Philippines. It contains the varietas Astathes perplexa var. mniszechii.
