= Astathes splendida =

Scientific classification
- Kingdom: Animalia
- Phylum: Arthropoda
- Clade: Pancrustacea
- Class: Insecta
- Order: Coleoptera
- Suborder: Polyphaga
- Infraorder: Cucujiformia
- Family: Cerambycidae
- Genus: Astathes
- Species: A. splendida

Binomial name
- Astathes splendida (Fabricius, 1792)

Synonyms
- Astathes decipiens Pascoe, 1859; Astathes flavicornis Pic, 1939; Astathes splendidula Aurivillius, 1923; Astathes splendidus Lacordaire, 1872; Cerambyx splendidus Fabricius, 1792

Species of beetle

Astathes splendida is a species of beetle in the family Cerambycidae. It was described by Johan Christian Fabricius in 1792. It is known from Borneo, Java and Sumatra.
