= Astathes contentiosa =

Scientific classification
- Domain: Eukaryota
- Kingdom: Animalia
- Phylum: Arthropoda
- Class: Insecta
- Order: Coleoptera
- Suborder: Polyphaga
- Infraorder: Cucujiformia
- Family: Cerambycidae
- Genus: Astathes
- Species: A. contentiosa

Binomial name
- Astathes contentiosa Pascoe, 1867

Species of beetle

Astathes contentiosa is a species of beetle in the family Cerambycidae. It was described by Pascoe in 1867. It is known from Malaysia and Singapore.
