= Astathes laosensis =

Scientific classification
- Kingdom: Animalia
- Phylum: Arthropoda
- Class: Insecta
- Order: Coleoptera
- Suborder: Polyphaga
- Infraorder: Cucujiformia
- Family: Cerambycidae
- Genus: Astathes
- Species: A. laosensis

Binomial name
- Astathes laosensis Pic, 1939

Species of beetle

Astathes laosensis is a species of beetle in the family Cerambycidae. It was described by Maurice Pic in 1939. It is known from Laos.
