= Astathes nitens =

Scientific classification
- Kingdom: Animalia
- Phylum: Arthropoda
- Clade: Pancrustacea
- Class: Insecta
- Order: Coleoptera
- Suborder: Polyphaga
- Infraorder: Cucujiformia
- Family: Cerambycidae
- Genus: Astathes
- Species: A. nitens

Binomial name
- Astathes nitens (Fabricius, 1801)

Synonyms
- Astathes fabricii J. Thomson, 1865; Cerambyx ignitus Illiger, 1805; Cerambyx nitens Fabricius, 1801 nec Fabricius, 1781

Species of beetle

Astathes nitens is a species of beetle in the family Cerambycidae. It was described by Johan Christian Fabricius in 1801. It is known from Malaysia, Java, Sumatra and Thailand.

== Varieties ==
- Astathes nitens var. apicalis Thomson, 1865
- Astathes nitens var. flavipennis Breuning, 1956
- Astathes nitens var. flavipes Breuning, 1956
- Astathes nitens var. nigroapicalis Breuning, 1956
- Astathes nitens var. thomsoni Breuning, 1956
- Astathes nitens var. vagemaculata Breuning, 1960
