= Parastathes apicalis =

Scientific classification
- Kingdom: Animalia
- Phylum: Arthropoda
- Class: Insecta
- Order: Coleoptera
- Suborder: Polyphaga
- Infraorder: Cucujiformia
- Family: Cerambycidae
- Genus: Parastathes
- Species: P. apicalis

Binomial name
- Parastathes apicalis (Aurivillius, 1925)

Synonyms
- Eustathes apicalis Aurivillius, 1925; Parastathes fuscoamplata Breuning, 1956

Species of beetle

Parastathes apicalis is a species of beetle in the family Cerambycidae. It was described by Per Olof Christopher Aurivillius in 1925 and is known from Borneo.
