= Plaxomicrus violaceomaculatus =

Scientific classification
- Kingdom: Animalia
- Phylum: Arthropoda
- Class: Insecta
- Order: Coleoptera
- Suborder: Polyphaga
- Infraorder: Cucujiformia
- Family: Cerambycidae
- Genus: Plaxomicrus
- Species: P. violaceomaculatus

Binomial name
- Plaxomicrus violaceomaculatus Pic, 1912

Species of beetle

Plaxomicrus violaceomaculatus is a species of beetle in the family Cerambycidae. It was described by Maurice Pic in 1912.
