= Momisis aegrota =

Scientific classification
- Domain: Eukaryota
- Kingdom: Animalia
- Phylum: Arthropoda
- Class: Insecta
- Order: Coleoptera
- Suborder: Polyphaga
- Infraorder: Cucujiformia
- Family: Cerambycidae
- Genus: Momisis
- Species: M. aegrota

Binomial name
- Momisis aegrota Pascoe, 1867

Synonyms
- Bacchisa nigriventris Ritsema, 1881 nec Thomson, 1865

Species of beetle

Momisis aegrota is a species of beetle in the family Cerambycidae. It was described by Pascoe in 1867. It is known from Indonesia.
