= Hispasthathes =

Scientific classification
- Domain: Eukaryota
- Kingdom: Animalia
- Phylum: Arthropoda
- Class: Insecta
- Order: Coleoptera
- Suborder: Polyphaga
- Infraorder: Cucujiformia
- Family: Cerambycidae
- Tribe: Astathini
- Genus: Hispasthathes

Genus of beetles

Hispasthathes is a genus of longhorn beetles of the subfamily Lamiinae.

- Hispasthathes ferruginea Aurivillius, 1926
- Hispasthathes hispoides (Aurivillius, 1911)
