= Astathes bipartita =

Scientific classification
- Kingdom: Animalia
- Phylum: Arthropoda
- Clade: Pancrustacea
- Class: Insecta
- Order: Coleoptera
- Suborder: Polyphaga
- Infraorder: Cucujiformia
- Family: Cerambycidae
- Genus: Astathes
- Species: A. bipartita

Binomial name
- Astathes bipartita Thomson, 1865

Species of beetle

Astathes bipartita is a species of beetle in the family Cerambycidae. It was described by Thomson in 1865. It is known from Malaysia and Sulawesi.

== Subspecies ==
- Astathes bipartita bipartita Thomson, 1865
- Astathes bipartita weisei (Heyden, 1897)
