= Astathes partita =

Scientific classification
- Kingdom: Animalia
- Phylum: Arthropoda
- Class: Insecta
- Order: Coleoptera
- Suborder: Polyphaga
- Infraorder: Cucujiformia
- Family: Cerambycidae
- Genus: Astathes
- Species: A. partita

Binomial name
- Astathes partita Gahan, 1901

Synonyms
- Cerambyx daldorfii Fabricius, 1801

Species of beetle

Astathes partita is a species of beetle in the family Cerambycidae. It was described by Gahan in 1901. It is known from Sumatra and Malaysia.
