= Astathes cincta =

Scientific classification
- Kingdom: Animalia
- Phylum: Arthropoda
- Clade: Pancrustacea
- Class: Insecta
- Order: Coleoptera
- Suborder: Polyphaga
- Infraorder: Cucujiformia
- Family: Cerambycidae
- Genus: Astathes
- Species: A. cincta

Binomial name
- Astathes cincta Gahan, 1901

Species of beetle

Astathes cincta is a species of beetle in the family Cerambycidae. It was described by Gahan in 1901. It is known from Java.
