= Astathes bimaculata =

Scientific classification
- Kingdom: Animalia
- Phylum: Arthropoda
- Clade: Pancrustacea
- Class: Insecta
- Order: Coleoptera
- Suborder: Polyphaga
- Infraorder: Cucujiformia
- Family: Cerambycidae
- Genus: Astathes
- Species: A. bimaculata

Binomial name
- Astathes bimaculata (Fabricius, 1792)

Synonyms
- Astathes externa Pascoe, 1859; Cerambyx 2maculatus Fabricius, 1792

Species of beetle

Astathes bimaculata is a species of beetle in the family Cerambycidae. It was described by Johan Christian Fabricius in 1792. It is known from India.
