= Momisis borneana =

Scientific classification
- Domain: Eukaryota
- Kingdom: Animalia
- Phylum: Arthropoda
- Class: Insecta
- Order: Coleoptera
- Suborder: Polyphaga
- Infraorder: Cucujiformia
- Family: Cerambycidae
- Genus: Momisis
- Species: M. borneana

Binomial name
- Momisis borneana Vives & Heffern, 2012

Species of beetle

Momisis borneana is a species of beetle in the family Cerambycidae. It was described by Vives and Heffern in 2012.
