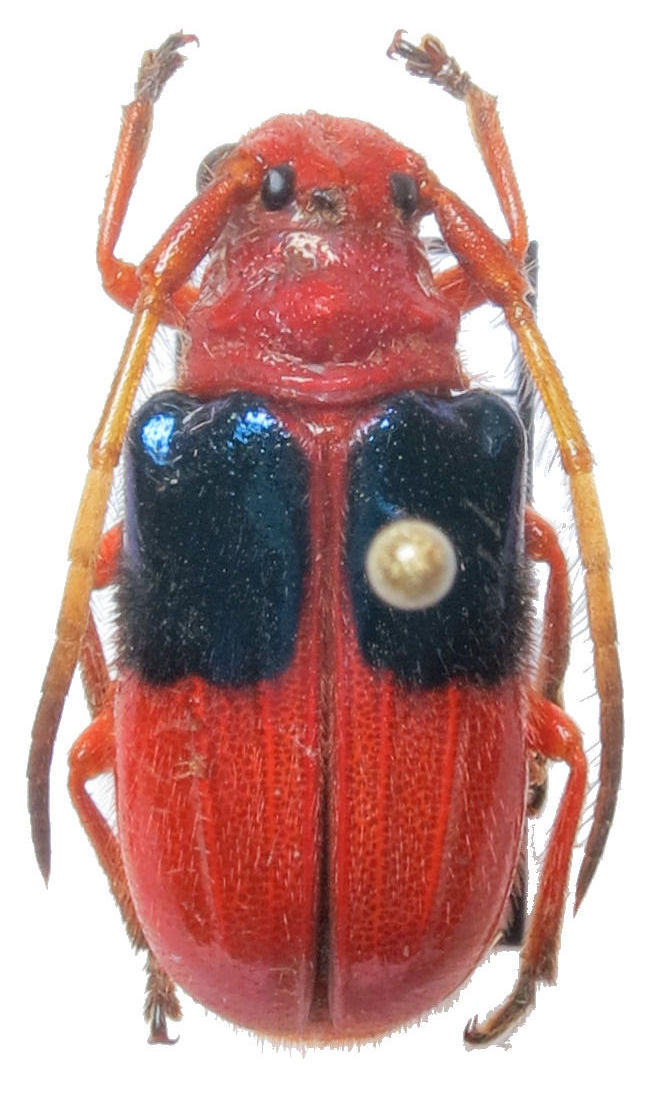
- Astathes levis var. basilis female

Scientific classification
- Domain: Eukaryota
- Kingdom: Animalia
- Phylum: Arthropoda
- Class: Insecta
- Order: Coleoptera
- Suborder: Polyphaga
- Infraorder: Cucujiformia
- Family: Cerambycidae
- Genus: Astathes
- Species: A. levis

Binomial name
- Astathes levis Newman, 1842

Synonyms
- Astathes casta Thomson, 1865; Astathes divisa Pascoe, 1859

= Astathes levis =

Species of beetle

Astathes levis is a species of beetle in the family Cerambycidae. It was described by Newman in 1842. It is known from the Philippines.

== Varietas ==
- Astathes levis var. basalis Thomson, 1865
- Astathes levis var. gallerucoides Thomson, 1865
- Astathes levis var. plagiata Gahan, 1901
