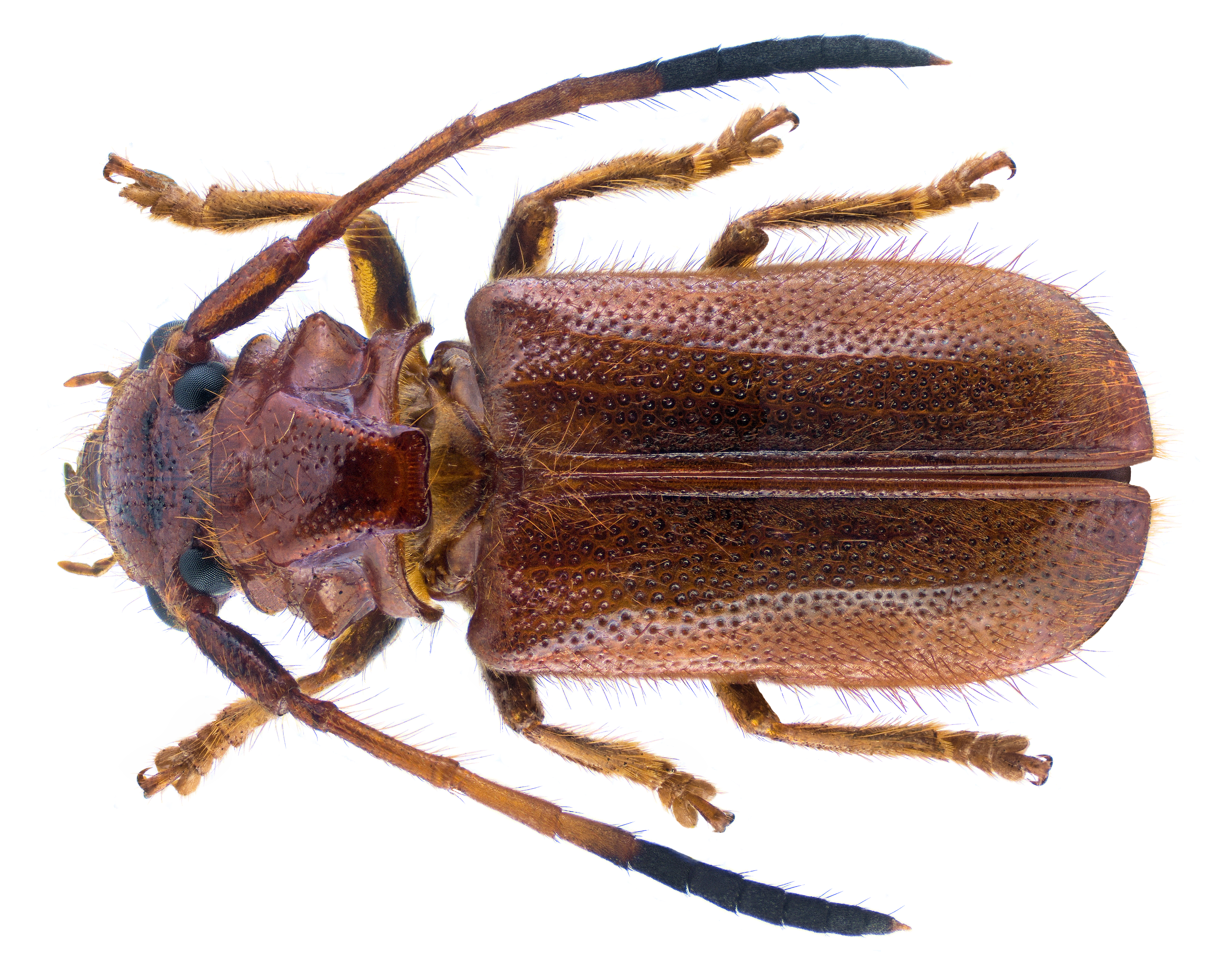

Scientific classification
- Kingdom: Animalia
- Phylum: Arthropoda
- Class: Insecta
- Order: Coleoptera
- Suborder: Polyphaga
- Infraorder: Cucujiformia
- Family: Cerambycidae
- Genus: Hecphora
- Species: H. testator

Binomial name
- Hecphora testator (Fabricius, 1781)

= Hecphora testator =

Species of beetle

Hecphora testator is a species of beetle in the family Cerambycidae. It was described by Johan Christian Fabricius in 1781.

== Subspecies ==
- Hecphora testator nitida Aurivillius, 1920
- Hecphora testator testator (Fabricius, 1781)
