= Astathes costipennis =

Scientific classification
- Kingdom: Animalia
- Phylum: Arthropoda
- Class: Insecta
- Order: Coleoptera
- Suborder: Polyphaga
- Infraorder: Cucujiformia
- Family: Cerambycidae
- Genus: Astathes
- Species: A. costipennis

Binomial name
- Astathes costipennis Fisher, 1935

Species of beetle

Astathes costipennis is a species of beetle in the family Cerambycidae. It was described by Fisher in 1935. It is known from Borneo.
