= Parastathes moultoni =

Scientific classification
- Kingdom: Animalia
- Phylum: Arthropoda
- Class: Insecta
- Order: Coleoptera
- Suborder: Polyphaga
- Infraorder: Cucujiformia
- Family: Cerambycidae
- Genus: Parastathes
- Species: P. moultoni

Binomial name
- Parastathes moultoni (Aurivillius, 1914)

Synonyms
- Eustathes moultoni Aurivillius, 1914

Species of beetle

Parastathes moultoni is a species of beetle in the family Cerambycidae. It was described by Per Olof Christopher Aurivillius in 1914 and is known from Borneo.
