= Astathes formosana =

Scientific classification
- Kingdom: Animalia
- Phylum: Arthropoda
- Class: Insecta
- Order: Coleoptera
- Suborder: Polyphaga
- Infraorder: Cucujiformia
- Family: Cerambycidae
- Genus: Astathes
- Species: A. formosana

Binomial name
- Astathes formosana Breuning, 1956

Species of beetle

Astathes formosana is a species of beetle in the family Cerambycidae. It was described by Breuning in 1956. It is known from Taiwan.
