= Momisis monticola =

Scientific classification
- Kingdom: Animalia
- Phylum: Arthropoda
- Class: Insecta
- Order: Coleoptera
- Suborder: Polyphaga
- Infraorder: Cucujiformia
- Family: Cerambycidae
- Genus: Momisis
- Species: M. monticola

Binomial name
- Momisis monticola Breuning, 1956

Species of beetle

Momisis monticola is a species of beetle in the family Cerambycidae. It was described by Breuning in 1956. It is known from India.
