= Astathes flaviventris =

Scientific classification
- Kingdom: Animalia
- Phylum: Arthropoda
- Class: Insecta
- Order: Coleoptera
- Suborder: Polyphaga
- Infraorder: Cucujiformia
- Family: Cerambycidae
- Genus: Astathes
- Species: A. flaviventris

Binomial name
- Astathes flaviventris Pascoe, 1867

Species of beetle

Astathes flaviventris is a species of beetle in the family Cerambycidae. It was described by Francis Polkinghorne Pascoe in 1867. It is known from Borneo.

== Varietas ==
- Astathes flaviventris var. apicerufa Breuning, 1956
- Astathes flaviventris var. borneensis Aurivillius, 1911
- Astathes flaviventris var. medioviolacea Breuning, 1950
- Astathes flaviventris var. violaceoreducta Breuning, 1956
