= Astathes bella =

Scientific classification
- Kingdom: Animalia
- Phylum: Arthropoda
- Clade: Pancrustacea
- Class: Insecta
- Order: Coleoptera
- Suborder: Polyphaga
- Infraorder: Cucujiformia
- Family: Cerambycidae
- Genus: Astathes
- Species: A. bella

Binomial name
- Astathes bella Gahan, 1901

Species of beetle

Astathes bella is a species of beetle in the family Cerambycidae. It was described by Gahan in 1901. It is known from Sulawesi.
