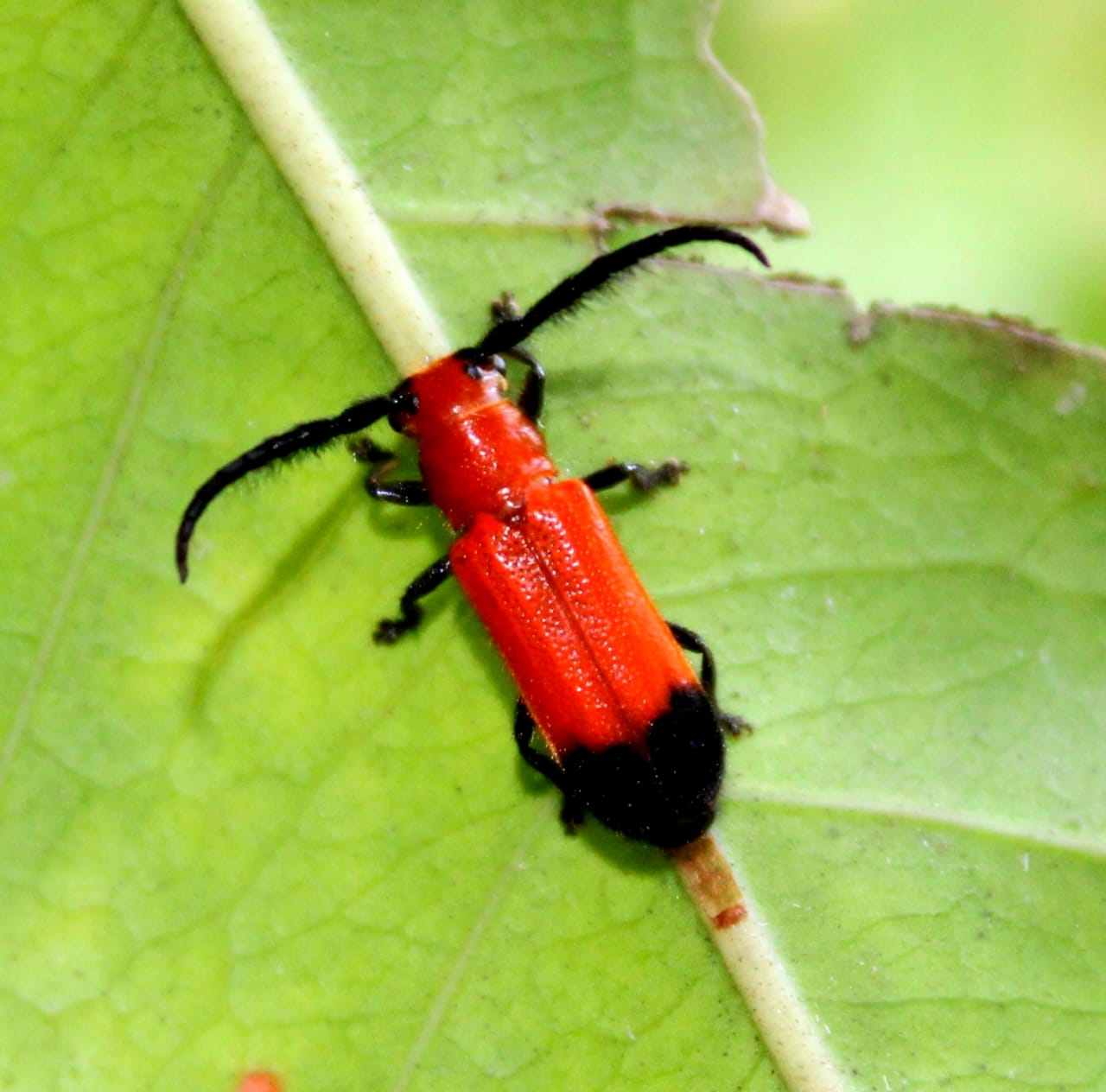

Scientific classification
- Kingdom: Animalia
- Phylum: Arthropoda
- Clade: Pancrustacea
- Class: Insecta
- Order: Coleoptera
- Suborder: Polyphaga
- Infraorder: Cucujiformia
- Family: Cerambycidae
- Genus: Cleonaria
- Species: C. cingalensis

Binomial name
- Cleonaria cingalensis Gahan, 1901

= Cleonaria cingalensis =

Species of beetle

Cleonaria cingalensis is a species of beetle in the family Cerambycidae. It was described by Gahan in 1901. It is known from Sri Lanka.
