= Anastathes biplagiata =

Scientific classification
- Domain: Eukaryota
- Kingdom: Animalia
- Phylum: Arthropoda
- Class: Insecta
- Order: Coleoptera
- Suborder: Polyphaga
- Infraorder: Cucujiformia
- Family: Cerambycidae
- Genus: Anastathes
- Species: A. biplagiata

Binomial name
- Anastathes biplagiata Gahan, 1901

Species of beetle

Anastathes biplagiata is a species of beetle in the family Cerambycidae. It was described by Gahan in 1901. It is known from Laos and Thailand.
