= Plaxomicrus szetschuanus =

Scientific classification
- Kingdom: Animalia
- Phylum: Arthropoda
- Class: Insecta
- Order: Coleoptera
- Suborder: Polyphaga
- Infraorder: Cucujiformia
- Family: Cerambycidae
- Genus: Plaxomicrus
- Species: P. szetschuanus

Binomial name
- Plaxomicrus szetschuanus Breuning, 1956

Species of beetle

Plaxomicrus szetschuanus is a species of beetle in the family Cerambycidae. It was described by Breuning in 1956.
