= Astathes straminea =

Scientific classification
- Domain: Eukaryota
- Kingdom: Animalia
- Phylum: Arthropoda
- Class: Insecta
- Order: Coleoptera
- Suborder: Polyphaga
- Infraorder: Cucujiformia
- Family: Cerambycidae
- Genus: Astathes
- Species: A. straminea

Binomial name
- Astathes straminea Pascoe, 1857

Species of beetle

Astathes straminea is a species of beetle in the family Cerambycidae. It was described by Pascoe in 1857. It is known from Myanmar.
