= Parastathes =

Scientific classification
- Domain: Eukaryota
- Kingdom: Animalia
- Phylum: Arthropoda
- Class: Insecta
- Order: Coleoptera
- Suborder: Polyphaga
- Infraorder: Cucujiformia
- Family: Cerambycidae
- Tribe: Astathini
- Genus: Parastathes

Genus of beetles

Parastathes is a genus of longhorn beetles of the subfamily Lamiinae.

subgenus Antennastathes

- Parastathes apicalis (Aurivillius, 1925)

subgenus Parastathes

- Parastathes basalis (Gahan, 1907)
- Parastathes flavicans (Gahan, 1907)
- Parastathes moultoni (Aurivillius, 1914)
