= Momisis singularis =

Scientific classification
- Domain: Eukaryota
- Kingdom: Animalia
- Phylum: Arthropoda
- Class: Insecta
- Order: Coleoptera
- Suborder: Polyphaga
- Infraorder: Cucujiformia
- Family: Cerambycidae
- Genus: Momisis
- Species: M. singularis

Binomial name
- Momisis singularis Ritsema, 1888

Species of beetle

Momisis singularis is a species of beetle in the family Cerambycidae. It was described by Coenraad Ritsema in 1888. It is known from Sumatra.
