= Ochrocesis =

Scientific classification
- Domain: Eukaryota
- Kingdom: Animalia
- Phylum: Arthropoda
- Class: Insecta
- Order: Coleoptera
- Suborder: Polyphaga
- Infraorder: Cucujiformia
- Family: Cerambycidae
- Tribe: Astathini
- Genus: Ochrocesis

Genus of beetles

Ochrocesis is a genus of longhorn beetles of the subfamily Lamiinae.

- Ochrocesis evanida Pascoe, 1867
- Ochrocesis myga Kriesche, 1926
