= Anastathes parva =

Scientific classification
- Domain: Eukaryota
- Kingdom: Animalia
- Phylum: Arthropoda
- Class: Insecta
- Order: Coleoptera
- Suborder: Polyphaga
- Infraorder: Cucujiformia
- Family: Cerambycidae
- Genus: Anastathes
- Species: A. parva

Binomial name
- Anastathes parva Gressitt, 1935

Synonyms
- Anastathes parva hainana Gressitt, 1942

Species of beetle

Anastathes parva is a species of beetle in the family Cerambycidae. It was described by Gressitt in 1935. It is known from China and Vietnam.
