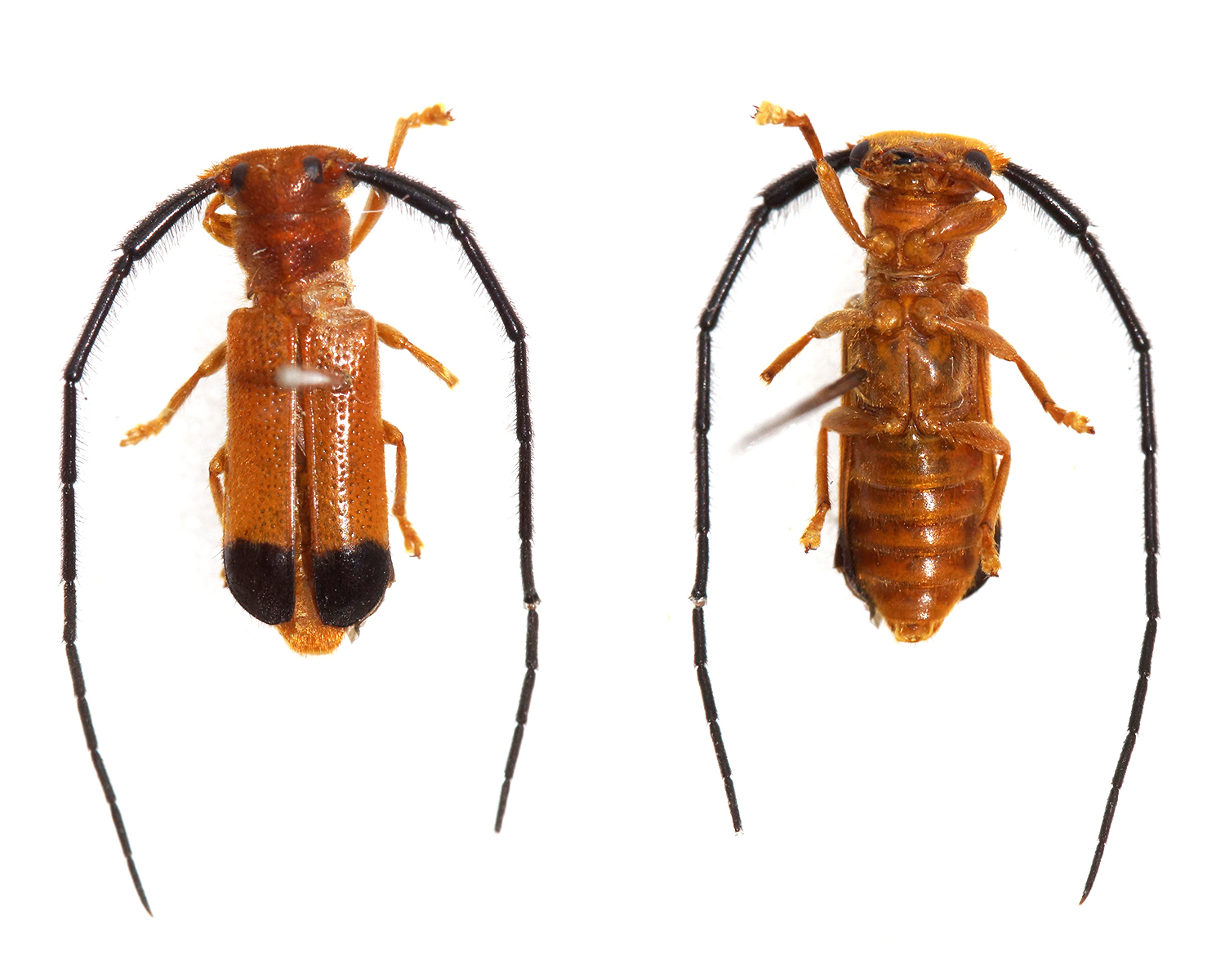

Scientific classification
- Kingdom: Animalia
- Phylum: Arthropoda
- Class: Insecta
- Order: Coleoptera
- Suborder: Polyphaga
- Infraorder: Cucujiformia
- Family: Cerambycidae
- Genus: Momisis
- Species: M. longicornis

Binomial name
- Momisis longicornis (Pic, 1912)

Synonyms
- Lasiophrys longicornis Pic, 1912; Lasiophrys tinhosensis Gressitt, 1940

= Momisis longicornis =

Species of beetle

Momisis longicornis is a species of beetle in the family Cerambycidae. It was described by Maurice Pic in 1912. It is known from China, Vietnam, Laos and Borneo.
