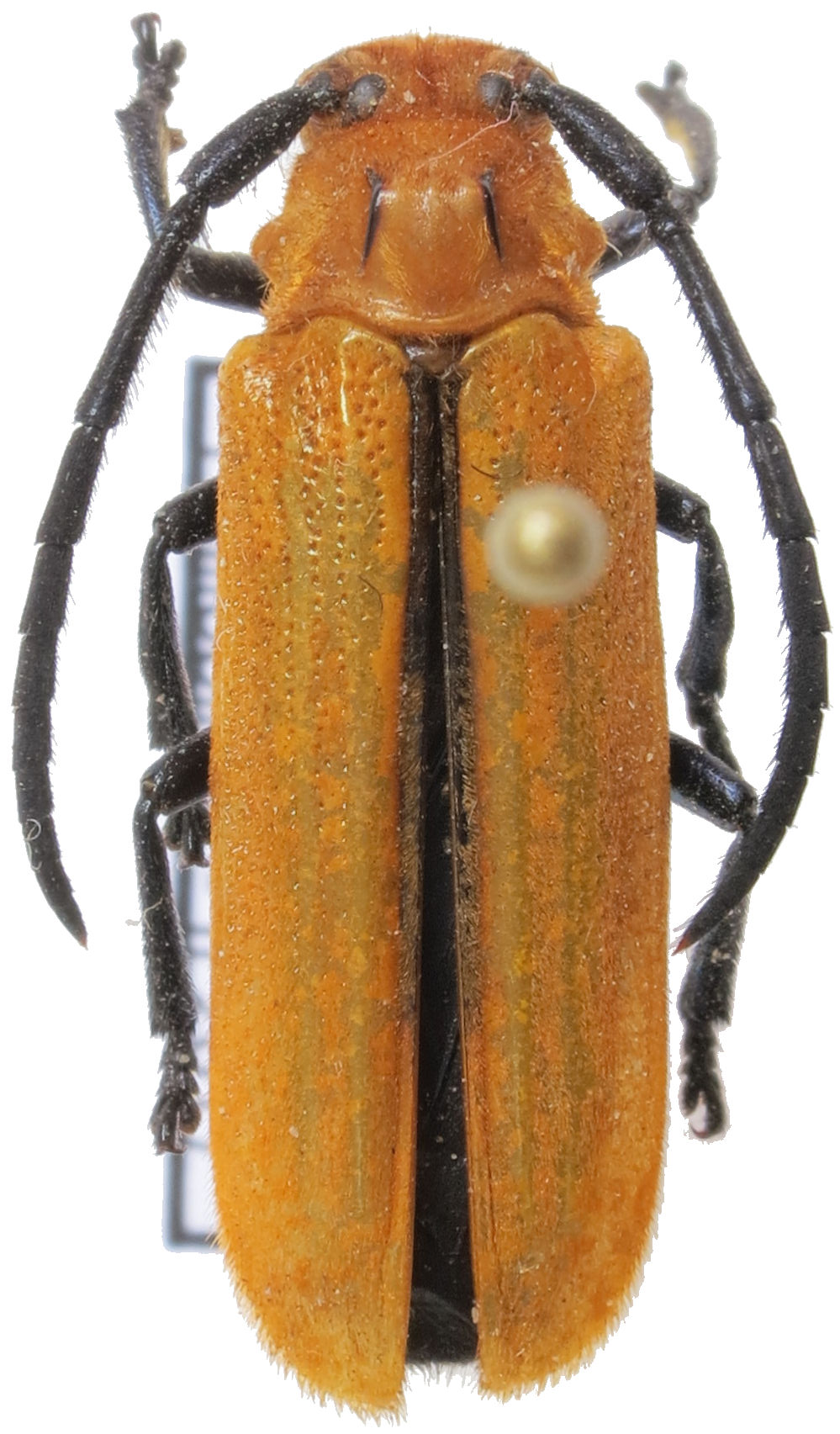
- Eustathes flava

Scientific classification
- Kingdom: Animalia
- Phylum: Arthropoda
- Class: Insecta
- Order: Coleoptera
- Suborder: Polyphaga
- Infraorder: Cucujiformia
- Family: Cerambycidae
- Subfamily: Lamiinae
- Tribe: Astathini
- Genus: Eustathes; Newman, 1842

= Eustathes =

Genus of beetles

Eustathes is a genus of longhorn beetles of the subfamily Lamiinae.

- Eustathes celebensis Chemin, 2011
- Eustathes flava Newman, 1842
- Eustathes mindanaonis Vives, 2009
- Eustathes semiusta Pascoe, 1867
