= Astathes gibbicollis =

Scientific classification
- Domain: Eukaryota
- Kingdom: Animalia
- Phylum: Arthropoda
- Class: Insecta
- Order: Coleoptera
- Suborder: Polyphaga
- Infraorder: Cucujiformia
- Family: Cerambycidae
- Genus: Astathes
- Species: A. gibbicollis

Binomial name
- Astathes gibbicollis Thomson, 1865

Species of beetle

Astathes gibbicollis is a species of beetle in the family Cerambycidae. It was described by Thomson in 1865.

== Subspecies ==
- Astathes gibbicollis baudoni Breuning, 1962
- Astathes gibbicollis gibbicollis Thomson, 1865
- Astathes gibbicollis siamensis Breuning, 1956
- Astathes gibbicollis tenasserimensis Breuning, 1956
- Astathes gibbicollis tibialis (Pic, 1921)
