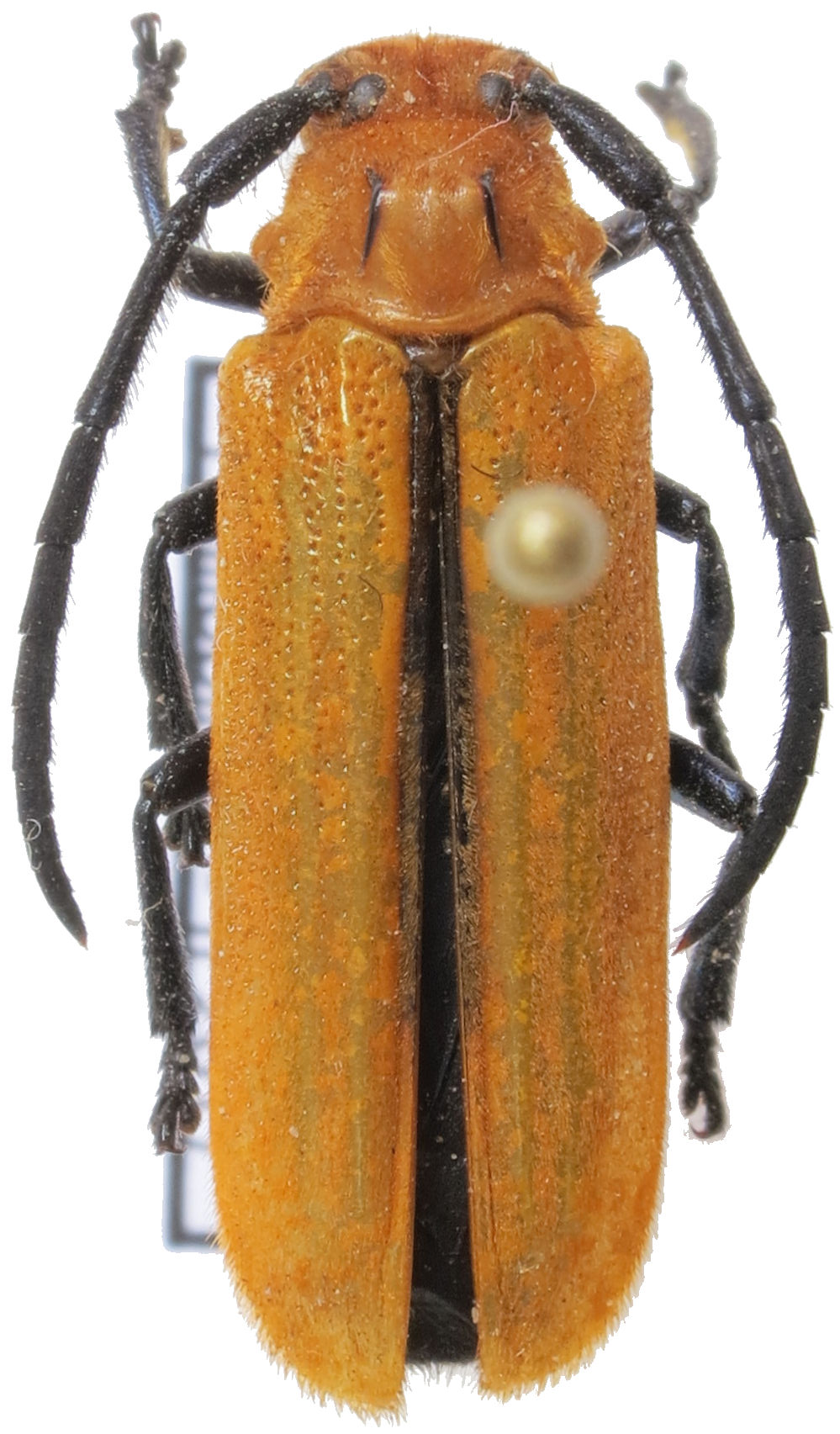
- Eustathes flava

Scientific classification
- Kingdom: Animalia
- Phylum: Arthropoda
- Clade: Pancrustacea
- Class: Insecta
- Order: Coleoptera
- Suborder: Polyphaga
- Infraorder: Cucujiformia
- Family: Cerambycidae
- Genus: Eustathes
- Species: E. flava

Binomial name
- Eustathes flava Newman, 1842

= Eustathes flava =

Species of beetle

Eustathes flava is a species of beetle in the family Cerambycidae. It was described by Newman in 1842. It is known from the Philippines and Sulawesi. It contains the varietas Eustathes flava var. femoralis.
