= Astathes sikanga =

Scientific classification
- Domain: Eukaryota
- Kingdom: Animalia
- Phylum: Arthropoda
- Class: Insecta
- Order: Coleoptera
- Suborder: Polyphaga
- Infraorder: Cucujiformia
- Family: Cerambycidae
- Genus: Astathes
- Species: A. sikanga

Binomial name
- Astathes sikanga (Gressitt, 1942)

Synonyms
- Chreonoma sikanga Gressitt, 1942

Species of beetle

Astathes sikanga is a species of beetle in the family Cerambycidae. It was described by Gressitt in 1942. It is known from China.
