= Astathes velata =

Scientific classification
- Kingdom: Animalia
- Phylum: Arthropoda
- Clade: Pancrustacea
- Class: Insecta
- Order: Coleoptera
- Suborder: Polyphaga
- Infraorder: Cucujiformia
- Family: Cerambycidae
- Genus: Astathes
- Species: A. velata

Binomial name
- Astathes velata Thomson, 1865

Synonyms
- Astathes rufescens Thomson, 1865; Astathes velata var. intermedia Gahan, 1901

Species of beetle

Astathes velata is a species of beetle in the family Cerambycidae. It was described by Thomson in 1865. It is known from Java.
