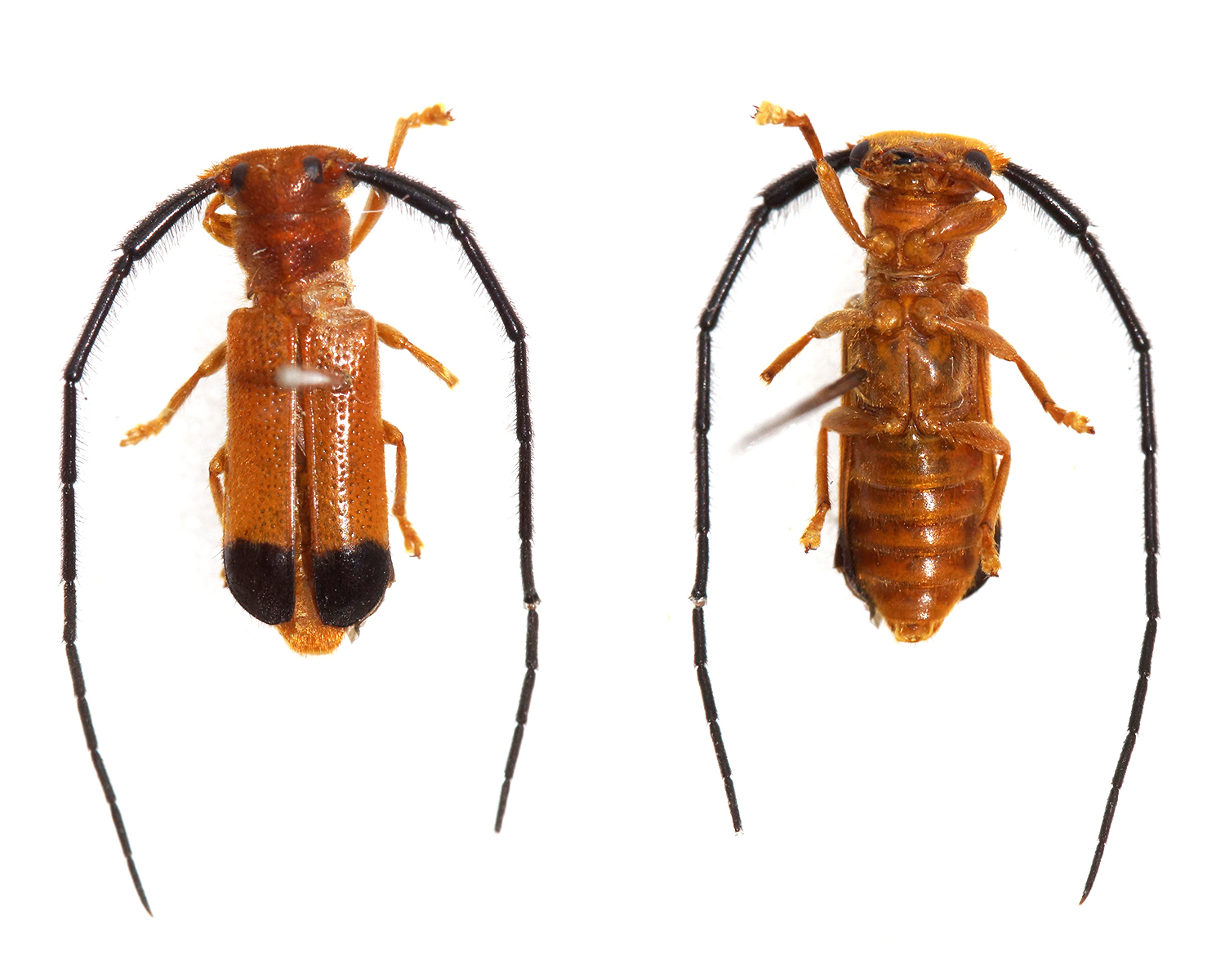
- Momisis longicornis

Scientific classification
- Domain: Eukaryota
- Kingdom: Animalia
- Phylum: Arthropoda
- Class: Insecta
- Order: Coleoptera
- Suborder: Polyphaga
- Infraorder: Cucujiformia
- Family: Cerambycidae
- Subfamily: Lamiinae
- Tribe: Astathini
- Genus: Momisis; Pascoe, 1867

Type species
- Momisis aegrota Pascoe, 1867

= Momisis =

Genus of beetles

Momisis is a genus of longhorn beetles of the subfamily Lamiinae.

- Momisis aegrota Pascoe, 1867
- Momisis borneana Vives & Heffern, 2012
- Momisis longicornis (Pic, 1912)
- Momisis longzhouensis Hua, 1982
- Momisis melanura Gahan, 1901
- Momisis monticola Breuning, 1956
- Momisis nicobarica Gardner, 1936
- Momisis singularis Ritsema, 1888
- Momisis submonticola Breuning, 1968
