= Astathes violaceipennis =

Scientific classification
- Domain: Eukaryota
- Kingdom: Animalia
- Phylum: Arthropoda
- Class: Insecta
- Order: Coleoptera
- Suborder: Polyphaga
- Infraorder: Cucujiformia
- Family: Cerambycidae
- Genus: Astathes
- Species: A. violaceipennis

Binomial name
- Astathes violaceipennis (J. Thomson, 1857)

Synonyms
- Astathes ignita Thomson, 1865; Tetraophthalmus fulgidus Thomson, 1857; Tetraophthalmus violaceipennis Thomson, 1857

Species of beetle

Astathes violaceipennis is a species of beetle in the family Cerambycidae. It was described by J. Thomson in 1857. It is known from China, Laos, India, Nepal, Thailand, Myanmar, and Vietnam.
