= Astathes bimaculatoides =

Scientific classification
- Kingdom: Animalia
- Phylum: Arthropoda
- Class: Insecta
- Order: Coleoptera
- Suborder: Polyphaga
- Infraorder: Cucujiformia
- Family: Cerambycidae
- Genus: Astathes
- Species: A. bimaculatoides

Binomial name
- Astathes bimaculatoides Breuning, 1971

Species of beetles

Astathes bimaculatoides is a species of beetle in the family Cerambycidae. It was described by Breuning in 1971. It is known from Laos.
