= Hispasthathes hispoides =

Scientific classification
- Kingdom: Animalia
- Phylum: Arthropoda
- Class: Insecta
- Order: Coleoptera
- Suborder: Polyphaga
- Infraorder: Cucujiformia
- Family: Cerambycidae
- Genus: Hispasthathes
- Species: H. hispoides

Binomial name
- Hispasthathes hispoides (Aurivillius, 1911)

Synonyms
- Hispastathes hispoides (Aurivillius, 1911); Plaxomicrus hispoides Aurivillius, 1911

Species of beetle

Hispasthathes hispoides is a species of beetle in the family Cerambycidae. It was described by Per Olof Christopher Aurivillius in 1911 and is known from Borneo.
