= Momisis melanura =

Scientific classification
- Domain: Eukaryota
- Kingdom: Animalia
- Phylum: Arthropoda
- Class: Insecta
- Order: Coleoptera
- Suborder: Polyphaga
- Infraorder: Cucujiformia
- Family: Cerambycidae
- Genus: Momisis
- Species: M. melanura

Binomial name
- Momisis melanura Gahan, 1901

Species of beetle

Momisis melanura is a species of beetle in the family Cerambycidae. It was described by Gahan in 1901. It is known from Australia.
