= Astathes posticata =

Scientific classification
- Domain: Eukaryota
- Kingdom: Animalia
- Phylum: Arthropoda
- Class: Insecta
- Order: Coleoptera
- Suborder: Polyphaga
- Infraorder: Cucujiformia
- Family: Cerambycidae
- Genus: Astathes
- Species: A. posticata

Binomial name
- Astathes posticata Gahan, 1901

Species of beetle

Astathes posticata is a species of beetle in the family Cerambycidae. It was described by Gahan in 1901. It is known from the Philippines.
