= Hispasthathes ferruginea =

Scientific classification
- Domain: Eukaryota
- Kingdom: Animalia
- Phylum: Arthropoda
- Class: Insecta
- Order: Coleoptera
- Suborder: Polyphaga
- Infraorder: Cucujiformia
- Family: Cerambycidae
- Genus: Hispasthathes
- Species: H. ferruginea

Binomial name
- Hispasthathes ferruginea Aurivillius, 1926

Synonyms
- Chreonoma ferruginea Aurivillius, 1927; Hispastathes ferruginea (Aurivillius, 1927)

Species of beetle

Hispasthathes ferruginea is a species of beetle in the family Cerambycidae. It was described by Per Olof Christopher Aurivillius in 1926 and is known from the Philippines.
