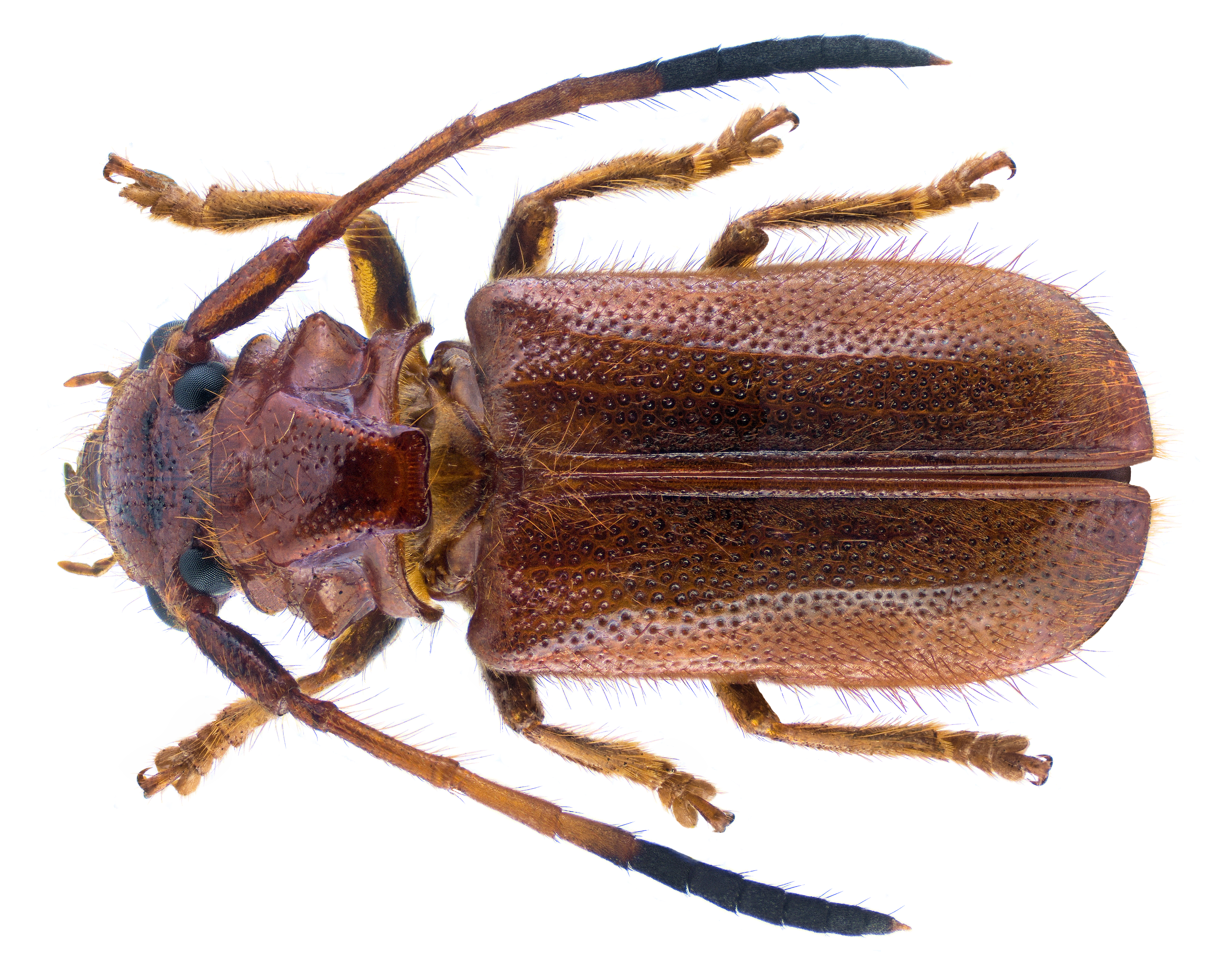
- Hecphora testator

Scientific classification
- Kingdom: Animalia
- Phylum: Arthropoda
- Class: Insecta
- Order: Coleoptera
- Suborder: Polyphaga
- Infraorder: Cucujiformia
- Family: Cerambycidae
- Tribe: Astathini
- Genus: Hecphora

= Hecphora =

Genus of beetles

Hecphora is a genus of longhorn beetles of the subfamily Lamiinae.

- Hecphora latefasciata Jordan, 1894
- Hecphora testator (Fabricius, 1781)
