= Plaxomicrus pallidicolor =

Scientific classification
- Kingdom: Animalia
- Phylum: Arthropoda
- Class: Insecta
- Order: Coleoptera
- Suborder: Polyphaga
- Infraorder: Cucujiformia
- Family: Cerambycidae
- Genus: Plaxomicrus
- Species: P. pallidicolor

Binomial name
- Plaxomicrus pallidicolor Pic, 1912

Species of beetle

Plaxomicrus pallidicolor is a species of beetle in the family Cerambycidae. It was described by Maurice Pic in 1912. It is known from China and Vietnam.
