= Astathes caloptera =

Scientific classification
- Kingdom: Animalia
- Phylum: Arthropoda
- Class: Insecta
- Order: Coleoptera
- Suborder: Polyphaga
- Infraorder: Cucujiformia
- Family: Cerambycidae
- Genus: Astathes
- Species: A. caloptera

Binomial name
- Astathes caloptera Pascoe, 1860

Synonyms
- Astathes cyanipennis J. Thomson, 1865

Species of beetle

Astathes caloptera is a species of beetle in the family Cerambycidae. It was described by Francis Polkinghorne Pascoe in 1860. It is known from Borneo.

== Varietas ==
- Astathes caloptera var. nigrobasiantennalis Breuning, 1956
- Astathes caloptera var. rufosternalis Breuning, 1956
