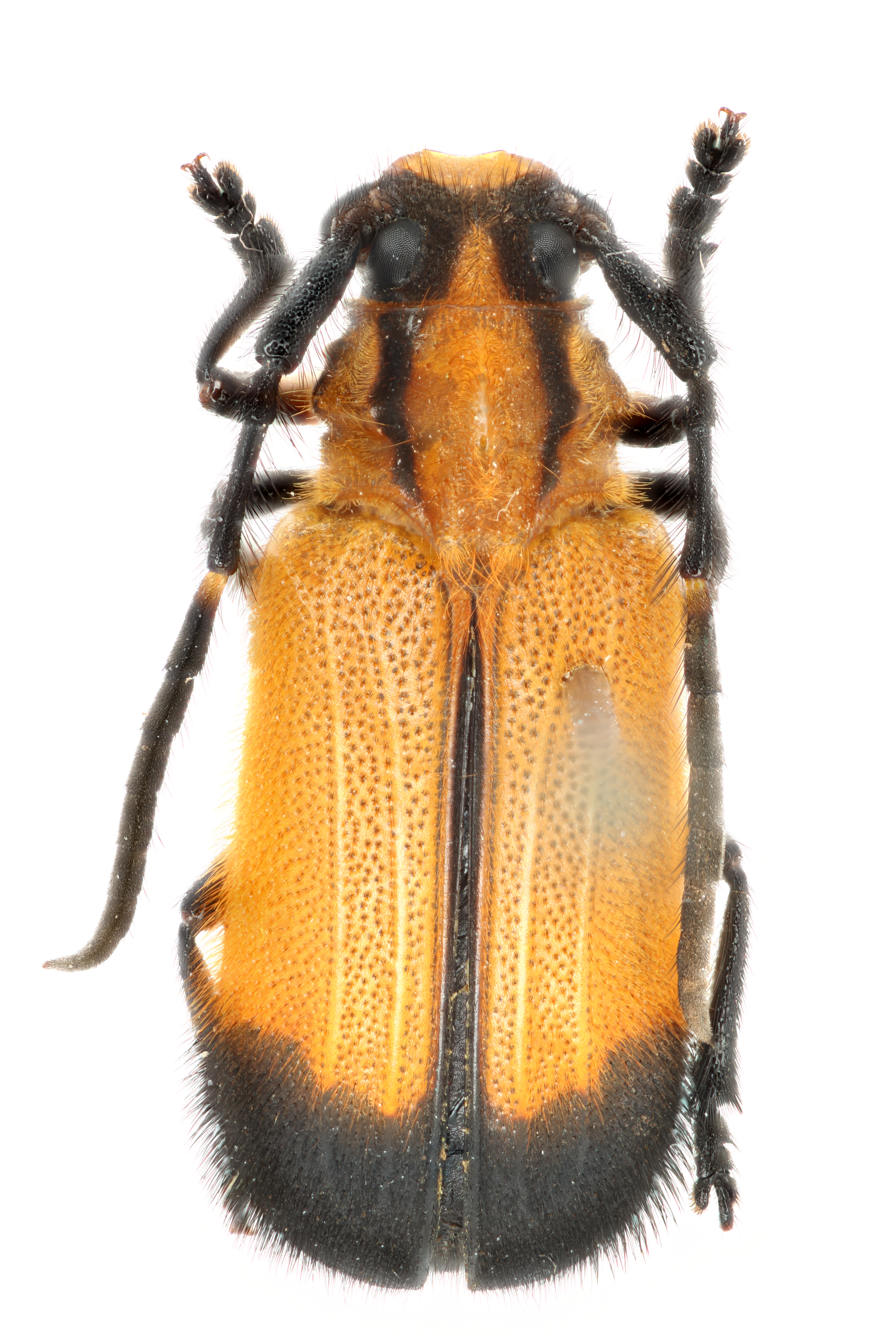

Scientific classification
- Kingdom: Animalia
- Phylum: Arthropoda
- Clade: Pancrustacea
- Class: Insecta
- Order: Coleoptera
- Suborder: Polyphaga
- Infraorder: Cucujiformia
- Family: Cerambycidae
- Genus: Hecphora
- Species: H. latefasciata

Binomial name
- Hecphora latefasciata Jordan, 1894

= Hecphora latefasciata =

Species of beetle

Hecphora latefasciata is a species of beetle in the family Cerambycidae. It was described by Karl Jordan in 1894.
