= Anastathes robusta =

Scientific classification
- Domain: Eukaryota
- Kingdom: Animalia
- Phylum: Arthropoda
- Class: Insecta
- Order: Coleoptera
- Suborder: Polyphaga
- Infraorder: Cucujiformia
- Family: Cerambycidae
- Genus: Anastathes
- Species: A. robusta

Binomial name
- Anastathes robusta Gressitt, 1940

Species of beetle

Anastathes robusta is a species of beetle in the family Cerambycidae. It was described by Judson Linsley Gressitt in 1940. It is known from China.
