= Astathes japonica =

Scientific classification
- Kingdom: Animalia
- Phylum: Arthropoda
- Class: Insecta
- Order: Coleoptera
- Suborder: Polyphaga
- Infraorder: Cucujiformia
- Family: Cerambycidae
- Genus: Astathes
- Species: A. japonica

Binomial name
- Astathes japonica (J. Thomson, 1857)

Synonyms
- Astathes bakeri Aurivillius, 1927; Astathes coccinea Pascoe, 1867; Astathes dohertyi Aurivillius, 1923; Astathes instabilis Gahan, 1901; Astathes montana Gahan, 1901; Astathes nigrosetosa Breuning, 1956; Astathes opalescens Fisher, 1935; Astathes unicolor Pascoe, 1867; Tetraophthalmus japonicus J. Thomson, 1857

Species of beetle

Astathes japonica is a species of beetle in the family Cerambycidae. It was described by J. Thomson in 1857. It is known from Borneo and the Philippines.
