= Astathes pseudopartita =

Scientific classification
- Kingdom: Animalia
- Phylum: Arthropoda
- Class: Insecta
- Order: Coleoptera
- Suborder: Polyphaga
- Infraorder: Cucujiformia
- Family: Cerambycidae
- Genus: Astathes
- Species: A. pseudopartita

Binomial name
- Astathes pseudopartita Breuning, 1956

Species of beetle

Astathes pseudopartita is a species of beetle in the family Cerambycidae. It was described by Stephan von Breuning in 1956.

== Subspecies ==
- Astathes pseudopartita bankaensis Breuning, 1956
- Astathes pseudopartita pseudopartita Breuning, 1956
