= Anastathes nigricornis =

Scientific classification
- Kingdom: Animalia
- Phylum: Arthropoda
- Clade: Pancrustacea
- Class: Insecta
- Order: Coleoptera
- Suborder: Polyphaga
- Infraorder: Cucujiformia
- Family: Cerambycidae
- Genus: Anastathes
- Species: A. nigricornis

Binomial name
- Anastathes nigricornis (Thomson, 1865)

Synonyms
- Astathes nigricornis Thomson, 1865; Chreonoma atricornis Pic, 1922

Species of beetle

Anastathes nigricornis is a species of beetle in the family Cerambycidae. It was described by James Thomson in 1865. It is known from China, Malaysia, Java, Indonesia and Vietnam.
