= Astathes fulgida =

Scientific classification
- Domain: Eukaryota
- Kingdom: Animalia
- Phylum: Arthropoda
- Class: Insecta
- Order: Coleoptera
- Suborder: Polyphaga
- Infraorder: Cucujiformia
- Family: Cerambycidae
- Genus: Astathes
- Species: A. fulgida

Binomial name
- Astathes fulgida (Fabricius, 1801)

Synonyms
- Cerambyx fulgidus Fabricius, 1801

Species of beetle

Astathes fulgida is a species of beetle in the family Cerambycidae. It was described by Johan Christian Fabricius in 1801. It is known from Sumatra.
