= Astathes janthinipennis =

Scientific classification
- Kingdom: Animalia
- Phylum: Arthropoda
- Class: Insecta
- Order: Coleoptera
- Suborder: Polyphaga
- Infraorder: Cucujiformia
- Family: Cerambycidae
- Genus: Astathes
- Species: A. janthinipennis

Binomial name
- Astathes janthinipennis Fairmaire, 1895

Synonyms
- Astathes janthipennis Fairmaire, 1895

Species of beetle

Astathes janthinipennis is a species of beetle in the family Cerambycidae. It was described by Fairmaire in 1895. It is known from China, Vietnam, Taiwan and Laos.

== Subspecies ==
- Astathes janthinipennis cyanoptera Gahan, 1900
- Astathes janthinipennis flava Chiang, 1963
- Astathes janthinipennis janthinipennis Fairmaire, 1895
- Astathes janthinipennis yunnanensis Breuning, 1956
