= Eustathes semiusta =

Scientific classification
- Kingdom: Animalia
- Phylum: Arthropoda
- Class: Insecta
- Order: Coleoptera
- Suborder: Polyphaga
- Infraorder: Cucujiformia
- Family: Cerambycidae
- Genus: Eustathes
- Species: E. semiusta

Binomial name
- Eustathes semiusta Pascoe, 1867

Species of beetle

Eustathes semiusta is a species of beetle in the family Cerambycidae. It was described by Pascoe in 1867. It is known from the Moluccas.
