= Astathes ignorantina =

Scientific classification
- Kingdom: Animalia
- Phylum: Arthropoda
- Clade: Pancrustacea
- Class: Insecta
- Order: Coleoptera
- Suborder: Polyphaga
- Infraorder: Cucujiformia
- Family: Cerambycidae
- Genus: Astathes
- Species: A. ignorantina

Binomial name
- Astathes ignorantina (J. Thomson, 1857)

Synonyms
- Astathes kuekenthali Heyden, 1897; Astathes posticalis J. Thomson, 1865; Astathes reductemaculata Breuning, 1956; Astathes rufinipes Breuning, 1956; Tetraophthalmus ignorantina J. Thomson, 1857

Species of beetle

Astathes ignorantina is a species of beetle in the family Cerambycidae. It was described by J. Thomson in 1857. It is known from Borneo and Java.
