= Plaxomicrus latus =

Scientific classification
- Domain: Eukaryota
- Kingdom: Animalia
- Phylum: Arthropoda
- Class: Insecta
- Order: Coleoptera
- Suborder: Polyphaga
- Infraorder: Cucujiformia
- Family: Cerambycidae
- Genus: Plaxomicrus
- Species: P. latus

Binomial name
- Plaxomicrus latus Gahan, 1901

Species of beetle

Plaxomicrus latus is a species of beetle in the family Cerambycidae. It was described by Gahan in 1901.
