= Astathes dimidiata =

Scientific classification
- Kingdom: Animalia
- Phylum: Arthropoda
- Clade: Pancrustacea
- Class: Insecta
- Order: Coleoptera
- Suborder: Polyphaga
- Infraorder: Cucujiformia
- Family: Cerambycidae
- Genus: Astathes
- Species: A. dimidiata

Binomial name
- Astathes dimidiata (Gory, 1844)

Synonyms
- Tetraopes dimidiata Gory, 1844; Tetraophthalmus dimidiatus (Gory) Thomson, 1857

Species of beetle

Astathes dimidiata is a species of beetle in the family Cerambycidae. It was described by Hippolyte Louis Gory in 1844. It is known from Java, Borneo, Myanmar, Malaysia, and Thailand.
