= Astathes terminata =

Scientific classification
- Kingdom: Animalia
- Phylum: Arthropoda
- Clade: Pancrustacea
- Class: Insecta
- Order: Coleoptera
- Suborder: Polyphaga
- Infraorder: Cucujiformia
- Family: Cerambycidae
- Genus: Astathes
- Species: A. terminata

Binomial name
- Astathes terminata Pascoe, 1857

Synonyms
- Astathes flavoscapus Breuning, 1956; Astathes javanica Aurivillius, 1923; Astathes rufoabdominalis Breuning, 1956; Astathes sumptuosa Gahan, 1901; Astathes westermanni Gahan, 1901

Species of beetle

Astathes terminata is a species of beetle in the family Cerambycidae. It was described by Francis Polkinghorne Pascoe in 1857. It is known from Malaysia, Borneo, Java and Sumatra.
