= Anastathes parallela =

Scientific classification
- Kingdom: Animalia
- Phylum: Arthropoda
- Class: Insecta
- Order: Coleoptera
- Suborder: Polyphaga
- Infraorder: Cucujiformia
- Family: Cerambycidae
- Genus: Anastathes
- Species: A. parallela

Binomial name
- Anastathes parallela Breuning, 1956

Species of beetle

Anastathes parallela is a species of beetle in the family Cerambycidae. It was described by Breuning in 1956. It is known from China.
