= Astathes bigemmata =

Scientific classification
- Domain: Eukaryota
- Kingdom: Animalia
- Phylum: Arthropoda
- Class: Insecta
- Order: Coleoptera
- Suborder: Polyphaga
- Infraorder: Cucujiformia
- Family: Cerambycidae
- Genus: Astathes
- Species: A. bigemmata

Binomial name
- Astathes bigemmata Thomson, 1865

Synonyms
- Astathes bigeminata Thomson, 1865

Species of beetle

Astathes bigemmata is a species of beetle in the family Cerambycidae. It was described by Thomson in 1865. It is known from the Philippines.
