= Eustathes celebensis =

Scientific classification
- Kingdom: Animalia
- Phylum: Arthropoda
- Clade: Pancrustacea
- Class: Insecta
- Order: Coleoptera
- Suborder: Polyphaga
- Infraorder: Cucujiformia
- Family: Cerambycidae
- Genus: Eustathes
- Species: E. celebensis

Binomial name
- Eustathes celebensis Chemin, 2011

Species of beetle

Eustathes celebensis is a species of beetle in the family Cerambycidae. It was described by Chemin in 2011. It is known from Sulawesi.
