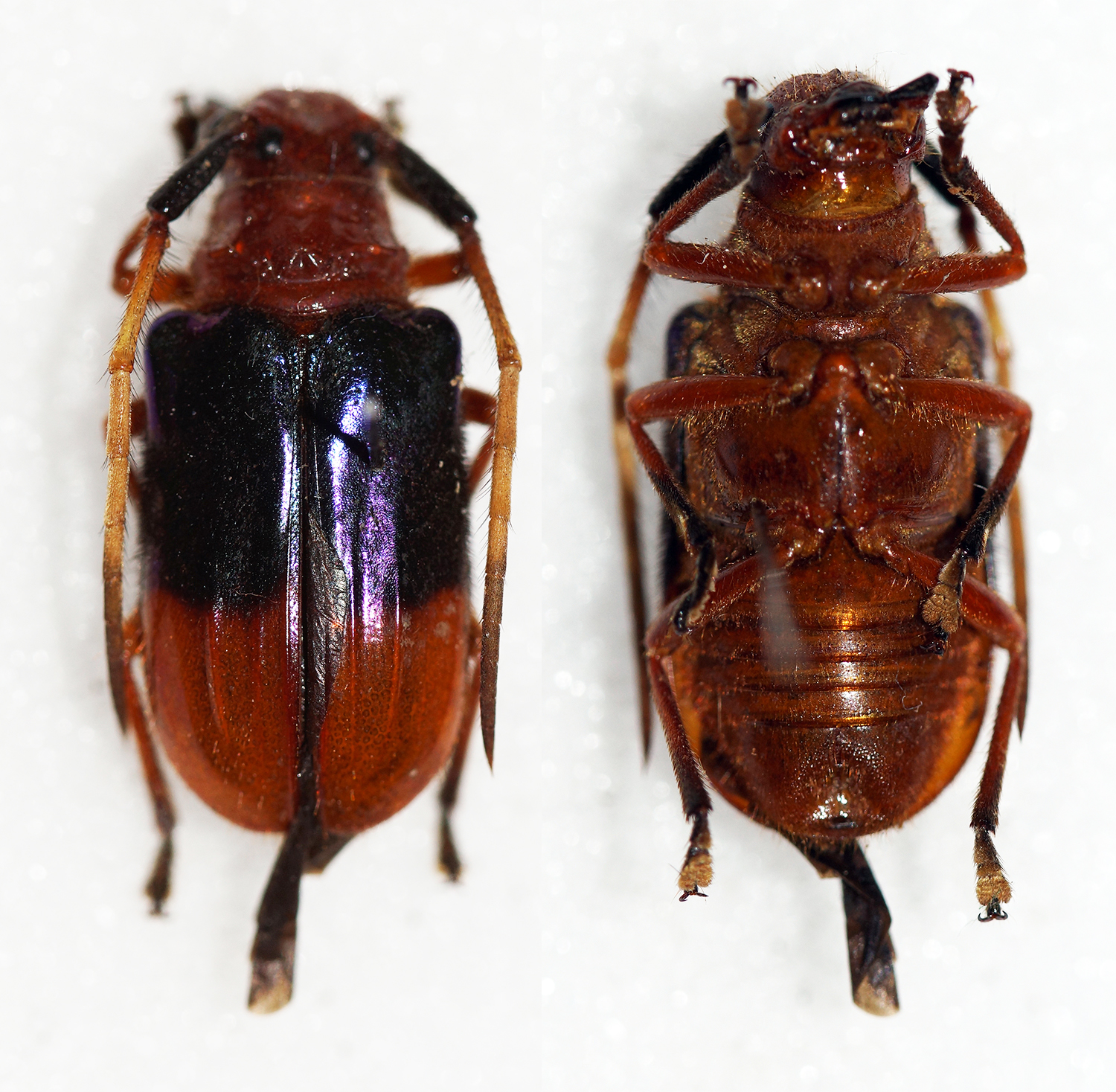
- Astathes levis

Scientific classification
- Domain: Eukaryota
- Kingdom: Animalia
- Phylum: Arthropoda
- Class: Insecta
- Order: Coleoptera
- Suborder: Polyphaga
- Infraorder: Cucujiformia
- Family: Cerambycidae
- Subfamily: Lamiinae
- Tribe: Astathini
- Genus: Astathes; Newman, 1842

= Astathes =

Genus of beetles

Astathes is a genus of longhorn beetles of the subfamily Lamiinae.

subgenus Africastathes

- Astathes distincta (Hintz, 1919)
- Astathes leonensis Breuning, 1956

subgenus Astathes

- Astathes bigemmata Thomson, 1865
- Astathes holorufa Breuning, 1968
- Astathes perplexa Newman, 1842
- Astathes posticata Gahan, 1901

subgenus Tetraophthalmus

- Astathes annamensis Breuning, 1956
- Astathes batoeensis Breuning, 1956
- Astathes bella Gahan, 1901
- Astathes bimaculata (Fabricius, 1792)
- Astathes bimaculatoides Breuning, 1971
- Astathes bipartita Thomson, 1865
- Astathes caloptera Pascoe, 1860
- Astathes cincta Gahan, 1901
- Astathes contentiosa Pascoe, 1867
- Astathes costipennis Fisher, 1935
- Astathes cupripennis Breuning, 1956
- Astathes cyanoptera Gahan, 1900
- Astathes dimidiata (Gory, 1844)
- Astathes episcopalis Chevrolat, 1852
- Astathes fasciata Gahan, 1901
- Astathes flaviventris Pascoe, 1867
- Astathes formosana Breuning, 1956
- Astathes fulgida (Fabricius, 1801)
- Astathes fulgidior Breuning, 1956
- Astathes gemmula Thomson, 1865
- Astathes gibbicollis Thomson, 1865
- Astathes ignorantina (J. Thomson, 1857)
- Astathes janthinipennis Fairmaire, 1895
- Astathes japonica (J. Thomson, 1857)
- Astathes laosensis Pic, 1939
- Astathes lemoides Thomson, 1865
- Astathes levis Newman, 1842
- Astathes nigrofasciata Breuning, 1956
- Astathes nitens (Fabricius, 1801)
- Astathes partita Gahan, 1901
- Astathes pseudopartita Breuning, 1956
- Astathes purpurea Pascoe, 1857
- Astathes sikanga (Gressitt, 1942)
- Astathes splendida (Fabricius, 1792)
- Astathes straminea Pascoe, 1857
- Astathes terminata Pascoe, 1857
- Astathes velata Thomson, 1865
- Astathes violaceipennis (Thomson, 1857)
- Astathes violaceoplagiata Breuning, 1956
