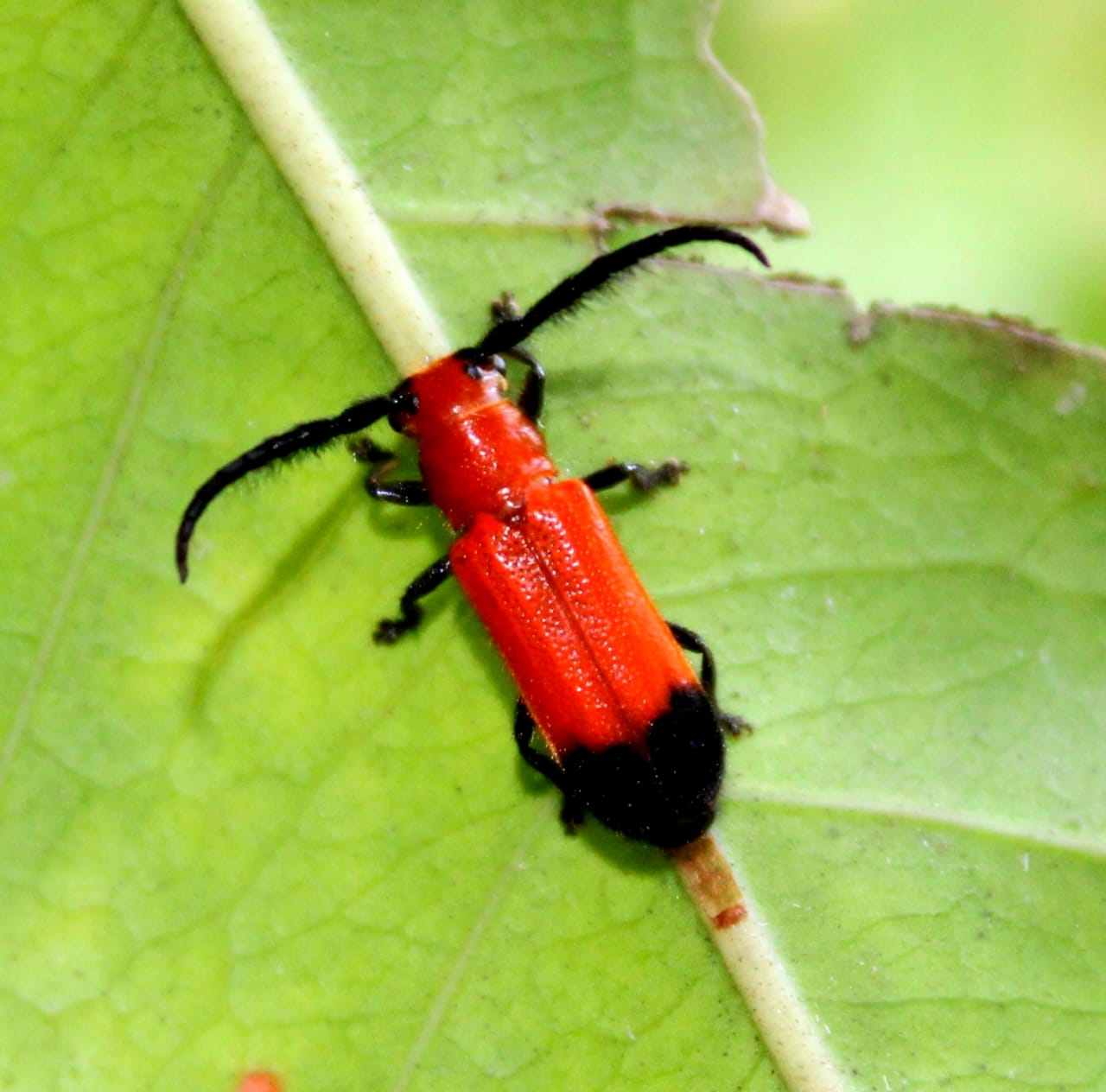
- Cleonaria cingalensis

Scientific classification
- Domain: Eukaryota
- Kingdom: Animalia
- Phylum: Arthropoda
- Class: Insecta
- Order: Coleoptera
- Suborder: Polyphaga
- Infraorder: Cucujiformia
- Family: Cerambycidae
- Tribe: Astathini
- Genus: Cleonaria; Thomson, 1864

= Cleonaria =

Genus of beetles

Cleonaria is a genus of longhorn beetles of the subfamily Lamiinae.

- Cleonaria bicolor Thomson, 1864
- Cleonaria cingalensis Gahan, 1901
- Cleonaria taiwana Hayashi, 1984
