= Plaxomicrus =

Scientific classification
- Domain: Eukaryota
- Kingdom: Animalia
- Phylum: Arthropoda
- Class: Insecta
- Order: Coleoptera
- Suborder: Polyphaga
- Infraorder: Cucujiformia
- Family: Cerambycidae
- Tribe: Astathini
- Genus: Plaxomicrus

Genus of beetles

Plaxomicrus is a genus of longhorn beetles of the subfamily Lamiinae.

- Plaxomicrus ellipticus Thomson, 1857
- Plaxomicrus latus Gahan, 1901
- Plaxomicrus nigriventris Pu, 1991
- Plaxomicrus oberthuri Gahan, 1901
- Plaxomicrus pallidicolor Pic, 1912
- Plaxomicrus sikkimensis Breuning, 1956
- Plaxomicrus szetschuanus Breuning, 1956
- Plaxomicrus violaceomaculatus Pic, 1912
