= Eustathes mindanaonis =

Scientific classification
- Kingdom: Animalia
- Phylum: Arthropoda
- Class: Insecta
- Order: Coleoptera
- Suborder: Polyphaga
- Infraorder: Cucujiformia
- Family: Cerambycidae
- Genus: Eustathes
- Species: E. mindanaonis

Binomial name
- Eustathes mindanaonis Vives, 2009

Species of beetle

Eustathes mindanaonis is a species of beetle in the family Cerambycidae. It was described by Vives in 2009. It is known from the Philippines.
