= Plaxomicrus oberthuri =

Scientific classification
- Domain: Eukaryota
- Kingdom: Animalia
- Phylum: Arthropoda
- Class: Insecta
- Order: Coleoptera
- Suborder: Polyphaga
- Infraorder: Cucujiformia
- Family: Cerambycidae
- Genus: Plaxomicrus
- Species: P. oberthuri

Binomial name
- Plaxomicrus oberthuri Gahan, 1901

Species of beetle

Plaxomicrus oberthuri is a species of beetle in the family Cerambycidae. It was described by Gahan in 1901. It is native to Meghalaya, India.
