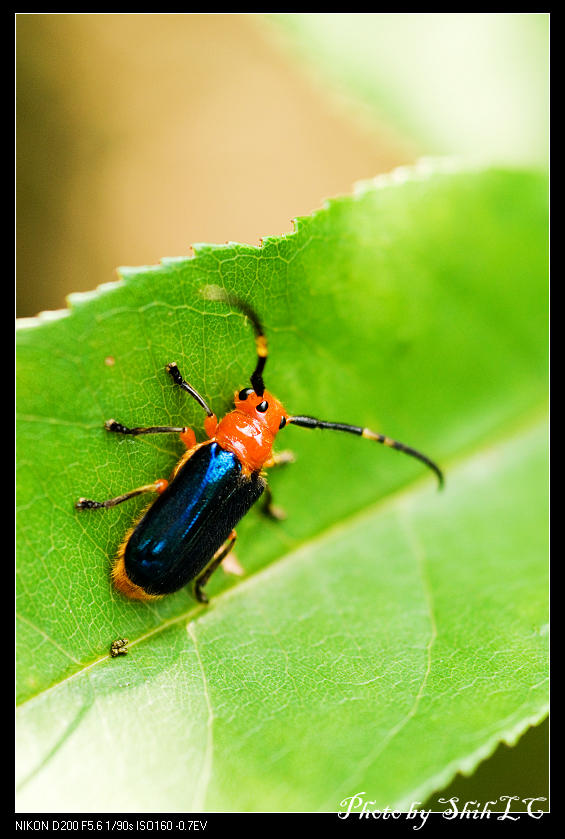

Scientific classification
- Domain: Eukaryota
- Kingdom: Animalia
- Phylum: Arthropoda
- Class: Insecta
- Order: Coleoptera
- Suborder: Polyphaga
- Infraorder: Cucujiformia
- Family: Cerambycidae
- Genus: Astathes
- Species: A. episcopalis

Binomial name
- Astathes episcopalis Chevrolat, 1852

Synonyms
- Tetraophthalmus episcopalis (Chevrolat, 1852)

= Astathes episcopalis =

Species of beetle

Astathes episcopalis is a species of beetle in the family Cerambycidae. It was described by Louis Alexandre Auguste Chevrolat in 1852. It is known from North Korea, Taiwan and China.
