= Chreomisis =

Scientific classification
- Kingdom: Animalia
- Phylum: Arthropoda
- Class: Insecta
- Order: Coleoptera
- Suborder: Polyphaga
- Infraorder: Cucujiformia
- Family: Cerambycidae
- Tribe: Astathini
- Genus: Chreomisis

Genus of beetles

Chreomisis is a genus of longhorn beetles of the subfamily Lamiinae. The genus and its two species Chreomisis flava and Chreomisis rufula were described by Stephan von Breuning in 1956.
