= Momisis longzhouensis =

Scientific classification
- Domain: Eukaryota
- Kingdom: Animalia
- Phylum: Arthropoda
- Class: Insecta
- Order: Coleoptera
- Suborder: Polyphaga
- Infraorder: Cucujiformia
- Family: Cerambycidae
- Genus: Momisis
- Species: M. longzhouensis

Binomial name
- Momisis longzhouensis Hua, 1982

Species of beetle

Momisis longzhouensis is a species of beetle in the family Cerambycidae. It was described by Hua in 1982. It is known from China.
