= Plaxomicrus ellipticus =

Scientific classification
- Domain: Eukaryota
- Kingdom: Animalia
- Phylum: Arthropoda
- Class: Insecta
- Order: Coleoptera
- Suborder: Polyphaga
- Infraorder: Cucujiformia
- Family: Cerambycidae
- Genus: Plaxomicrus
- Species: P. ellipticus

Binomial name
- Plaxomicrus ellipticus Thomson, 1857

Species of beetle

Plaxomicrus ellipticus is a species of beetle in the family Cerambycidae. It was described by Thomson in 1857.

== Varietas ==
- Plaxomicrus ellipticus var. basiflavus Breuning, 1956
- Plaxomicrus ellipticus var. circumscutellaris Breuning, 1956
- Plaxomicrus ellipticus var. hanoiensis Breuning, 1956
- Plaxomicrus ellipticus var. imbasalis Breuning, 1956
