= Anastathes =

Scientific classification
- Domain: Eukaryota
- Kingdom: Animalia
- Phylum: Arthropoda
- Class: Insecta
- Order: Coleoptera
- Suborder: Polyphaga
- Infraorder: Cucujiformia
- Family: Cerambycidae
- Subfamily: Lamiinae
- Genus: Anastathes; Gahan, 1901

Type species
- Astathes nigricornis Thomson, 1865

Genus of beetles

Anastathes is a genus of longhorn beetles of the subfamily Lamiinae. As of 2018, it consists of the following species:

- Anastathes biplagiata Gahan, 1901
- Anastathes nigricornis (Thomson, 1865)
- Anastathes parallela Breuning, 1956
- Anastathes parva Gressitt, 1935
- Anastathes robusta Gressitt, 1940
