= Tropimetopa =

Scientific classification
- Kingdom: Animalia
- Phylum: Arthropoda
- Class: Insecta
- Order: Coleoptera
- Suborder: Polyphaga
- Infraorder: Cucujiformia
- Family: Cerambycidae
- Genus: Tropimetopa
- Species: T. simulator

Binomial name
- Tropimetopa simulator (Pascoe, 1856)

Genus of beetles

Tropimetopa simulator is a species of beetle in the family Cerambycidae, and the only species in the genus Tropimetopa. It was described by Pascoe in 1856.
