= Mystacophorus =

Scientific classification
- Kingdom: Animalia
- Phylum: Arthropoda
- Class: Insecta
- Order: Coleoptera
- Suborder: Polyphaga
- Infraorder: Cucujiformia
- Family: Cerambycidae
- Genus: Mystacophorus
- Species: M. mystax

Binomial name
- Mystacophorus mystax Duvivier, 1891

Genus of beetles

Mystacophorus mystax is a species of beetle in the family Cerambycidae, and the only species in the genus Mystacophorus. It was described by Duvivier in 1891.
