= Abacetus leonensis =

Scientific classification
- Kingdom: Animalia
- Phylum: Arthropoda
- Class: Insecta
- Order: Coleoptera
- Suborder: Adephaga
- Family: Carabidae
- Genus: Abacetus
- Species: A. leonensis

Binomial name
- Abacetus leonensis Tschitscherine, 1899

Species of beetle

Abacetus leonensis is a species of ground beetle in the subfamily Pterostichinae. It was described by Tschitscherine in 1899 and is found in Sierra Leone. The original description characterizes the species as shiny black with an iridescent surface, particularly on the elytra, with ferruginous red antennae and reddish-testaceous legs.
