= Scapastathes =

Scientific classification
- Kingdom: Animalia
- Phylum: Arthropoda
- Class: Insecta
- Order: Coleoptera
- Suborder: Polyphaga
- Infraorder: Cucujiformia
- Family: Cerambycidae
- Genus: Scapastathes
- Species: S. violaceipennis

Binomial name
- Scapastathes violaceipennis Breuning, 1956

Genus of beetles

Scapastathes violaceipennis is a species of beetle in the family Cerambycidae, and the only species in the genus Scapastathes. It was described by Stephan von Breuning in 1956.
