= Lasiophrys =

Scientific classification
- Kingdom: Animalia
- Phylum: Arthropoda
- Class: Insecta
- Order: Coleoptera
- Suborder: Polyphaga
- Infraorder: Cucujiformia
- Family: Cerambycidae
- Genus: Lasiophrys
- Species: L. latifrons

Binomial name
- Lasiophrys latifrons Gahan, 1901

Genus of beetles

Lasiophrys latifrons is a species of beetle in the family Cerambycidae, and the only species in the genus Lasiophrys. It was described by Gahan in 1901.
