= Tolidostena (subgenus) =

Scientific classification
- Kingdom: Animalia
- Phylum: Arthropoda
- Class: Insecta
- Order: Coleoptera
- Family: Mordellidae
- Genus: Tolidostena
- Subgenus: Tolidostena Ermisch, 1942

Subgenus of beetles

Tolidostena is a subgenus of beetles in the family Mordellidae, containing the following species:

- Tolidostena atripennis Nakane, 1956
- Tolidostena ermischi Nakane, 1956
- Tolidostena fusei (Tokeji)
- Tolidostena japonica (Tokeji, 1953)
- Tolidostena montana Kiyoyama, 1991
- Tolidostena similator Kiyoyama, 1991
- Tolidostena tarsalis Ermisch, 1942
