= Atripennis =

Atripennis may refer to:

- Dahana atripennis, the black-winged dahana, species of moth in the subfamily Arctiinae
- Gaurotes atripennis, species of beetle in the family Cerambycidae
- Glipa atripennis, species of beetle in the genus Glipa
- Hydrocanthus atripennis, species of burrowing water beetle in the family Noteridae
- Phytoecia atripennis, species of beetle in the family Cerambycidae
- Pinacodera atripennis, species of beetle in the family Carabidae
- Sophronica atripennis, species of beetle in the family Cerambycidae
- Tolidostena atripennis, species of beetle in the family Mordellidae
- Xanthomelanodes atripennis, species of bristle fly in the family Tachinidae
- Zonitis atripennis, species of blister beetle in the family Meloidae
