= Orange blister beetle =

Orange blister beetle is a common name for several insects and may refer to:

- Mylabris pustulata, native to South Asia
- Zonitis vittigera, native to North America
