= Pinacodera chevrolati =

Scientific classification
- Kingdom: Animalia
- Phylum: Arthropoda
- Class: Insecta
- Order: Coleoptera
- Suborder: Adephaga
- Family: Carabidae
- Subfamily: Lebiinae
- Tribe: Lebiini
- Subtribe: Cymindidina
- Genus: Pinacodera
- Species: P. chevrolati

Binomial name
- Pinacodera chevrolati (Dejean, 1836)

Synonyms
- Cymindis chevrolati

Species of beetle

Pinacodera chevrolati is a species in the beetle family Carabidae. It is found in Mexico.

== Subspecies ==
These three subspecies belong to the species Pinacodera chevrolati:

- Pinacodera chevrolati amblygona Bates, 1878
- Pinacodera chevrolati angulifera Bates, 1878
- Pinacodera chevrolati chevrolati (Dejean, 1836)
