= Gaurotes otome =

Scientific classification
- Kingdom: Animalia
- Phylum: Arthropoda
- Class: Insecta
- Order: Coleoptera
- Suborder: Polyphaga
- Infraorder: Cucujiformia
- Family: Cerambycidae
- Genus: Gaurotes
- Species: G. otome

Binomial name
- Gaurotes otome Ohbayashi, 1959

Species of beetle

Gaurotes otome is a species of beetle in the family Cerambycidae. It was described by Ohbayashi in 1959.
