= Zonitis bilineata =

Scientific classification
- Domain: Eukaryota
- Kingdom: Animalia
- Phylum: Arthropoda
- Class: Insecta
- Order: Coleoptera
- Suborder: Polyphaga
- Infraorder: Cucujiformia
- Family: Meloidae
- Genus: Zonitis
- Species: Z. bilineata

Binomial name
- Zonitis bilineata Say, 1817

Species of beetle

Zonitis bilineata is a species of blister beetle in the family Meloidae. It is found in North America. Their larvae have been observed feeding on bee eggs.
