= Gaurotes spinipennis =

Scientific classification
- Kingdom: Animalia
- Phylum: Arthropoda
- Class: Insecta
- Order: Coleoptera
- Suborder: Polyphaga
- Infraorder: Cucujiformia
- Family: Cerambycidae
- Genus: Gaurotes
- Species: G. spinipennis

Binomial name
- Gaurotes spinipennis Pu, 1992

Species of beetle

Gaurotes spinipennis is a species of beetle in the family Cerambycidae. It was described by Pu in 1992.
