= Gaurotes tibetana =

Scientific classification
- Kingdom: Animalia
- Phylum: Arthropoda
- Class: Insecta
- Order: Coleoptera
- Suborder: Polyphaga
- Infraorder: Cucujiformia
- Family: Cerambycidae
- Genus: Gaurotes
- Species: G. tibetana

Binomial name
- Gaurotes tibetana Podaný, 1962

Species of beetle

Gaurotes tibetana is a species of beetle in the family Cerambycidae. It was described by Podaný in 1962.
