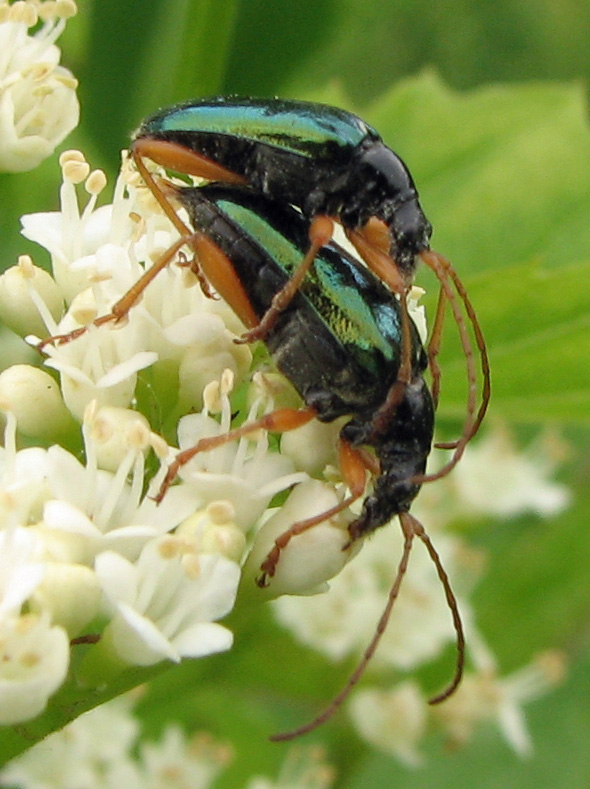

Scientific classification
- Kingdom: Animalia
- Phylum: Arthropoda
- Class: Insecta
- Order: Coleoptera
- Suborder: Polyphaga
- Infraorder: Cucujiformia
- Family: Cerambycidae
- Genus: Gaurotes
- Species: G. cyanipennis

Binomial name
- Gaurotes cyanipennis (Say, 1824)

= Gaurotes cyanipennis =

Species of beetle

Gaurotes cyanipennis is a species of beetle in the family Cerambycidae. It was described by Say in 1824.
