= Gaurotes filiola =

Scientific classification
- Kingdom: Animalia
- Phylum: Arthropoda
- Class: Insecta
- Order: Coleoptera
- Suborder: Polyphaga
- Infraorder: Cucujiformia
- Family: Cerambycidae
- Genus: Gaurotes
- Species: G. filiola

Binomial name
- Gaurotes filiola Holzschuh, 1998

Species of beetle

Gaurotes filiola is a species of beetle in the family Cerambycidae. It was described by Holzschuh in 1998.
