= Pinacodera cribrata =

Scientific classification
- Kingdom: Animalia
- Phylum: Arthropoda
- Class: Insecta
- Order: Coleoptera
- Suborder: Adephaga
- Family: Carabidae
- Subfamily: Lebiinae
- Tribe: Lebiini
- Subtribe: Cymindidina
- Genus: Pinacodera
- Species: P. cribrata

Binomial name
- Pinacodera cribrata Chaudoir, 1875

Synonyms
- Cymindis cribrata

Species of beetle

Pinacodera cribrata is a species in the beetle family Carabidae. It is found in Guatemala and Mexico.
