= Pinacodera rufostigma =

Scientific classification
- Kingdom: Animalia
- Phylum: Arthropoda
- Class: Insecta
- Order: Coleoptera
- Suborder: Adephaga
- Family: Carabidae
- Subfamily: Lebiinae
- Tribe: Lebiini
- Subtribe: Cymindidina
- Genus: Pinacodera
- Species: P. rufostigma

Binomial name
- Pinacodera rufostigma (Hunting, 2013)

Synonyms
- Cymindis rufostigma

Species of beetle

Pinacodera rufostigma is a species in the beetle family Carabidae. It is found in the United States.
