= Pinacodera ampliata =

Scientific classification
- Kingdom: Animalia
- Phylum: Arthropoda
- Class: Insecta
- Order: Coleoptera
- Suborder: Adephaga
- Family: Carabidae
- Subfamily: Lebiinae
- Tribe: Lebiini
- Subtribe: Cymindidina
- Genus: Pinacodera
- Species: P. ampliata

Binomial name
- Pinacodera ampliata Casey, 1920

Synonyms
- Cymindis ampliata

Species of beetle

Pinacodera ampliata is a species in the beetle family Carabidae. It is found in the United States.
