= Gaurotes thoracica =

Scientific classification
- Kingdom: Animalia
- Phylum: Arthropoda
- Class: Insecta
- Order: Coleoptera
- Suborder: Polyphaga
- Infraorder: Cucujiformia
- Family: Cerambycidae
- Genus: Gaurotes
- Species: G. thoracica

Binomial name
- Gaurotes thoracica (Haldeman, 1847)

Species of beetle

Gaurotes thoracica is a species of beetle in the family Cerambycidae. It was described by Haldeman in 1847.
