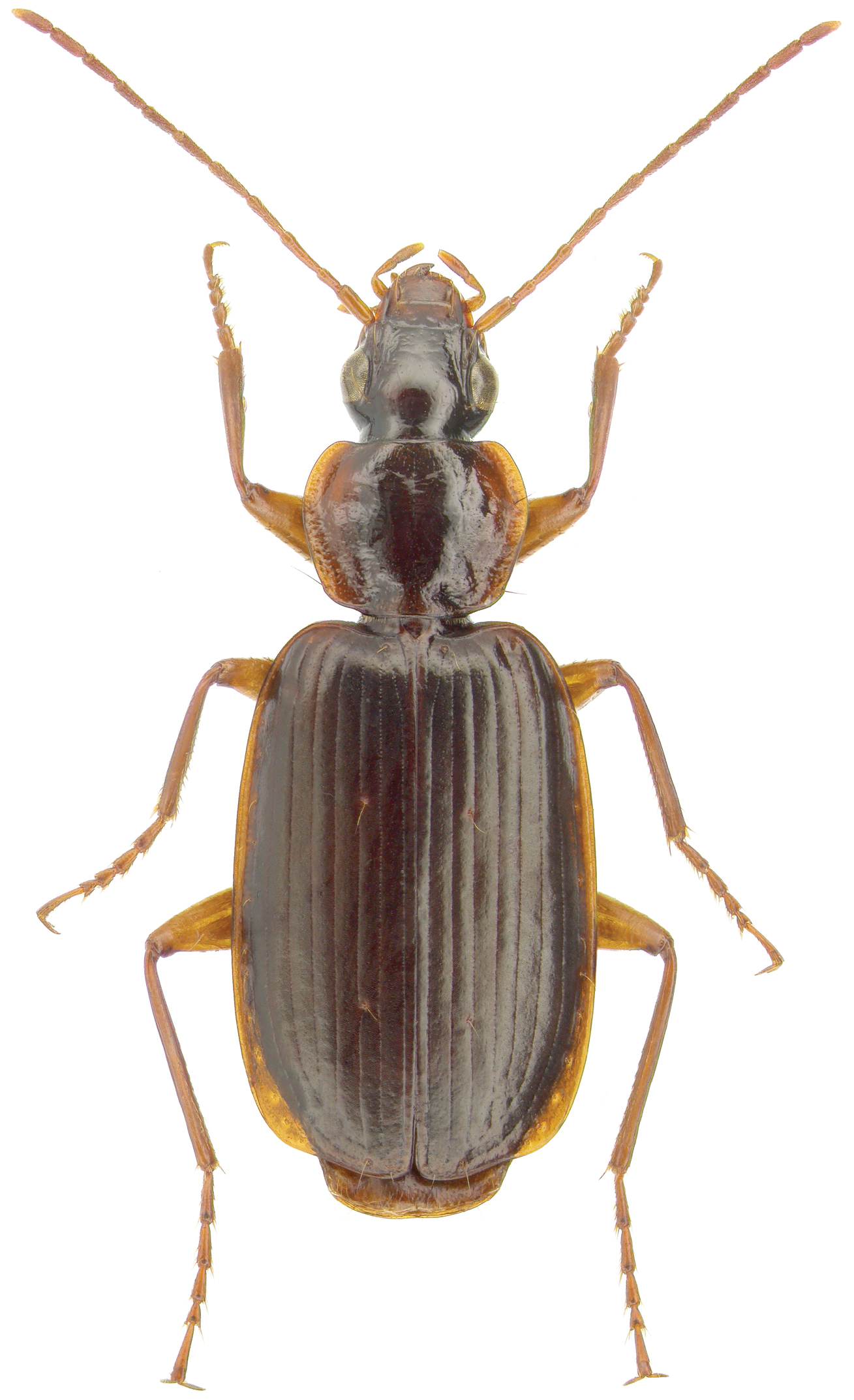

Scientific classification
- Kingdom: Animalia
- Phylum: Arthropoda
- Class: Insecta
- Order: Coleoptera
- Suborder: Adephaga
- Family: Carabidae
- Genus: Pinacodera
- Species: P. platicollis

Binomial name
- Pinacodera platicollis (Say, 1823)

= Pinacodera platicollis =

Species of beetle

Pinacodera platicollis is a species in the beetle family Carabidae. It is found in the United States and Canada.
