= Gaurotes tuberculicollis =

Scientific classification
- Kingdom: Animalia
- Phylum: Arthropoda
- Class: Insecta
- Order: Coleoptera
- Suborder: Polyphaga
- Infraorder: Cucujiformia
- Family: Cerambycidae
- Genus: Gaurotes
- Species: G. tuberculicollis

Binomial name
- Gaurotes tuberculicollis (Blanchard, 1871)

Species of beetle

Gaurotes tuberculicollis is a species of beetle in the family Cerambycidae. It was described by Blanchard in 1871.
