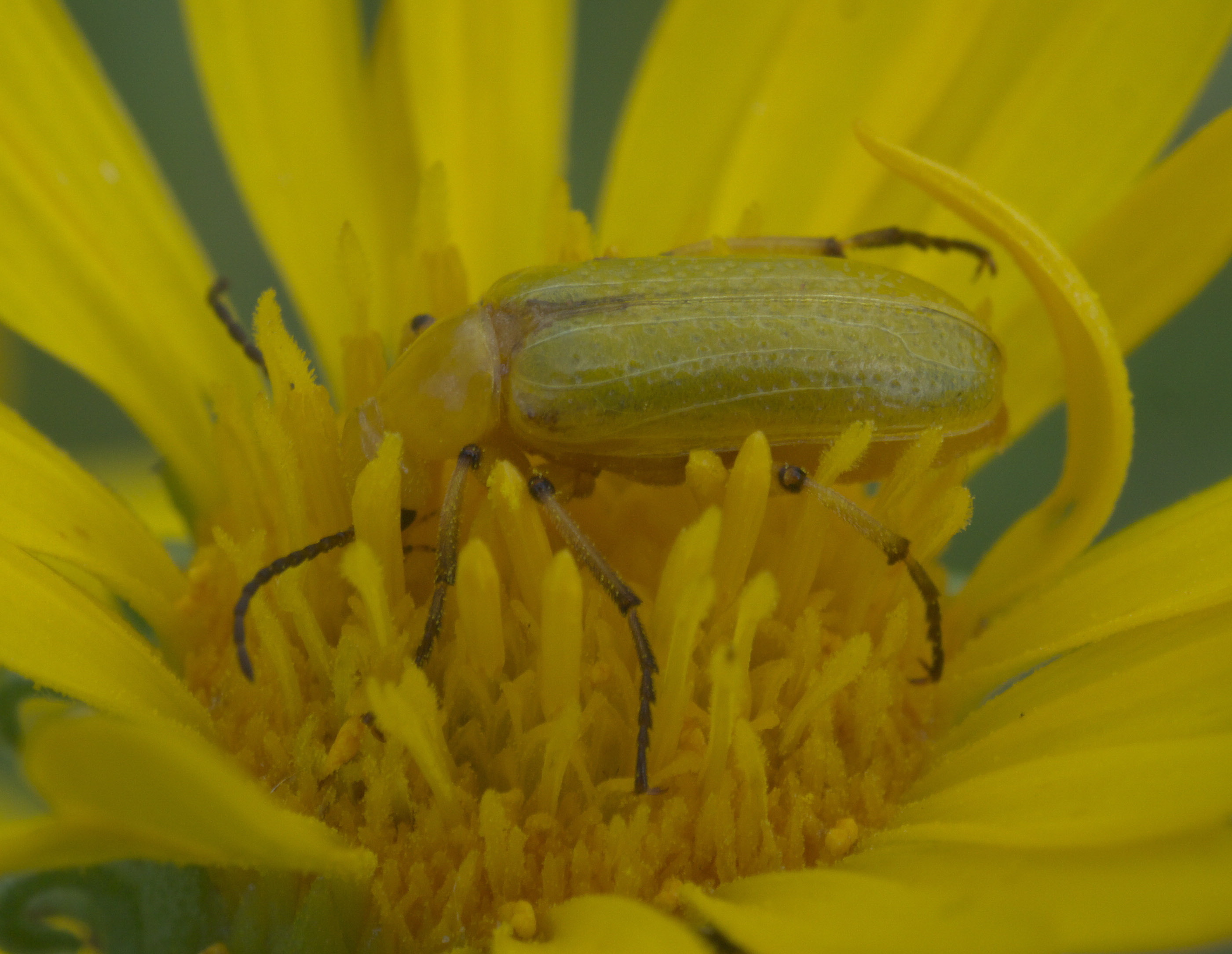

Scientific classification
- Kingdom: Animalia
- Phylum: Arthropoda
- Class: Insecta
- Order: Coleoptera
- Suborder: Polyphaga
- Infraorder: Cucujiformia
- Family: Meloidae
- Genus: Zonitis
- Species: Z. sayi

Binomial name
- Zonitis sayi Wickham, 1905

= Zonitis sayi =

Species of beetle

Zonitis sayi is a species of blister beetle in the family Meloidae. It is found in North America from Mexico to Canada.

Zonitis sayi measure 8–12 mm (0.31–0.47 in) in length.

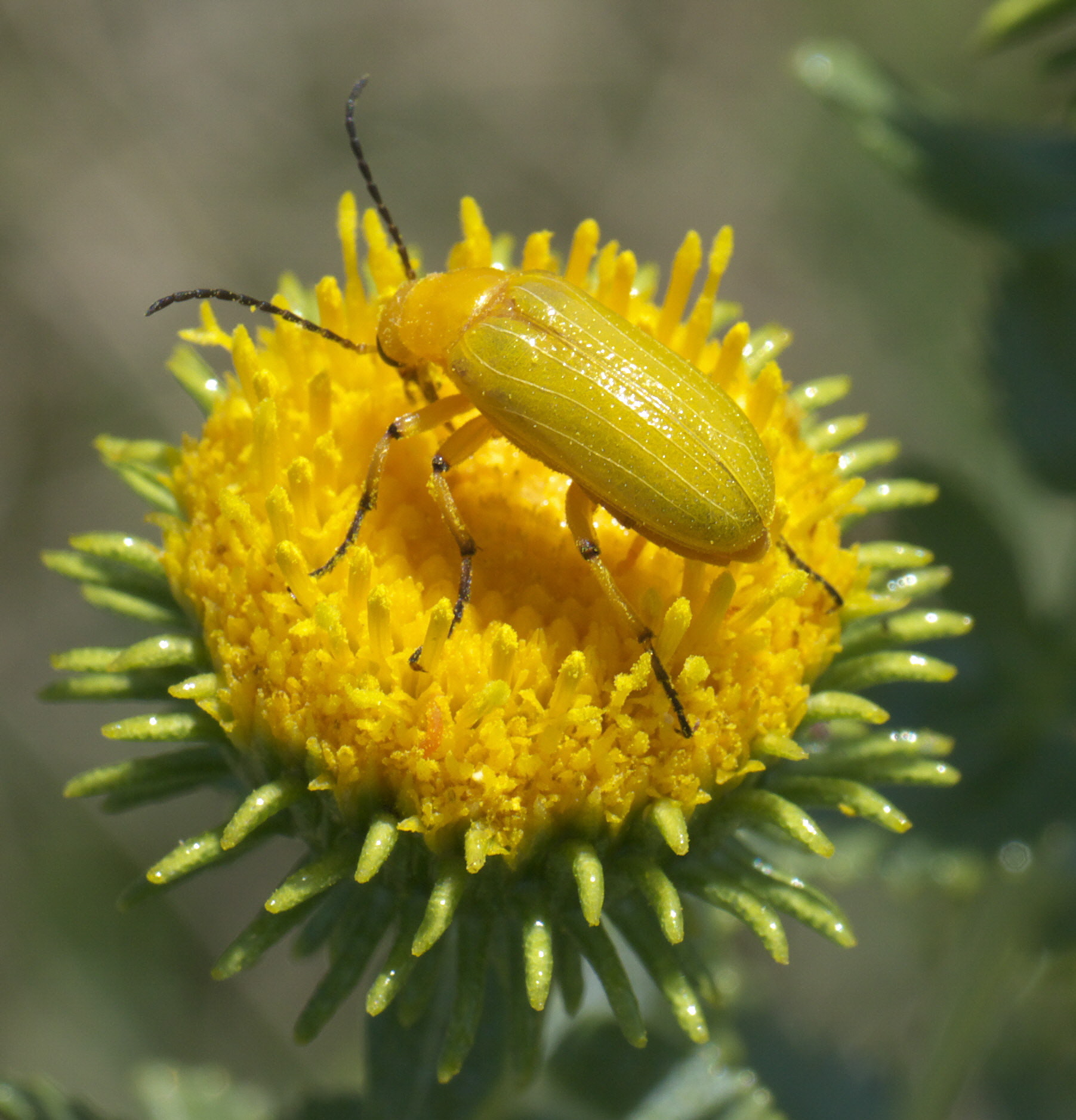
