= Pinacodera punctifera =

Scientific classification
- Kingdom: Animalia
- Phylum: Arthropoda
- Class: Insecta
- Order: Coleoptera
- Suborder: Adephaga
- Family: Carabidae
- Subfamily: Lebiinae
- Tribe: Lebiini
- Subtribe: Cymindidina
- Genus: Pinacodera
- Species: P. punctifera

Binomial name
- Pinacodera punctifera (LeConte, 1884)

Synonyms
- Cymindis punctifera

Species of beetle

Pinacodera punctifera is a species in the beetle family Carabidae. It is found in the United States.
