= Zonitis perforata =

Scientific classification
- Kingdom: Animalia
- Phylum: Arthropoda
- Class: Insecta
- Order: Coleoptera
- Suborder: Polyphaga
- Infraorder: Cucujiformia
- Family: Meloidae
- Genus: Zonitis
- Species: Z. perforata

Binomial name
- Zonitis perforata Casey, 1891

Species of beetle

Zonitis perforata is a species of blister beetle in the family Meloidae. It is found in North America.
