= Gaurotes latiuscula =

Scientific classification
- Kingdom: Animalia
- Phylum: Arthropoda
- Class: Insecta
- Order: Coleoptera
- Suborder: Polyphaga
- Infraorder: Cucujiformia
- Family: Cerambycidae
- Genus: Gaurotes
- Species: G. latiuscula

Binomial name
- Gaurotes latiuscula Holzschuh, 1993

Species of beetle

Gaurotes latiuscula is a species of beetle in the family Cerambycidae. It was described by Holzschuh in 1993.
