= Zonitis fogoensis =

Scientific classification
- Domain: Eukaryota
- Kingdom: Animalia
- Phylum: Arthropoda
- Class: Insecta
- Order: Coleoptera
- Suborder: Polyphaga
- Infraorder: Cucujiformia
- Family: Meloidae
- Genus: Zonitis
- Species: Z. fogoensis

Binomial name
- Zonitis fogoensis Kaszab & Geishardt, 1985

Species of beetle

Zonitis fogoensis is a species of blister beetles of the family Meloidae. It is endemic to Cape Verde, where it occurs on the island of Fogo. The specific name fogoensis refers to its type locality, the island of Fogo.
