= Pinacodera basipunctata =

Scientific classification
- Domain: Eukaryota
- Kingdom: Animalia
- Phylum: Arthropoda
- Class: Insecta
- Order: Coleoptera
- Suborder: Adephaga
- Family: Carabidae
- Subfamily: Lebiinae
- Tribe: Lebiini
- Subtribe: Cymindidina
- Genus: Pinacodera
- Species: P. basipunctata

Binomial name
- Pinacodera basipunctata Chaudoir, 1875

Synonyms
- Cymindis basipunctata

Species of beetle

Pinacodera basipunctata is a species in the beetle family Carabidae. It is found in Guatemala and Mexico.
