= Zonitis dunniana =

Scientific classification
- Domain: Eukaryota
- Kingdom: Animalia
- Phylum: Arthropoda
- Class: Insecta
- Order: Coleoptera
- Suborder: Polyphaga
- Infraorder: Cucujiformia
- Family: Meloidae
- Genus: Zonitis
- Species: Z. dunniana

Binomial name
- Zonitis dunniana Champion, 1891

Species of beetle

Zonitis dunniana is a species of blister beetle in the family Meloidae. It is found in North America.
