= Pinacodera sulcipennis =

Scientific classification
- Kingdom: Animalia
- Phylum: Arthropoda
- Class: Insecta
- Order: Coleoptera
- Suborder: Adephaga
- Family: Carabidae
- Subfamily: Lebiinae
- Tribe: Lebiini
- Subtribe: Cymindidina
- Genus: Pinacodera
- Species: P. sulcipennis

Binomial name
- Pinacodera sulcipennis G.Horn, 1881

Synonyms
- Cymindis sulcipennis

Species of beetle

Pinacodera sulcipennis is a species in the beetle family Carabidae. It is found in Mexico.
