= Tolidostena fusei =

Scientific classification
- Kingdom: Animalia
- Phylum: Arthropoda
- Class: Insecta
- Order: Coleoptera
- Suborder: Polyphaga
- Infraorder: Cucujiformia
- Family: Mordellidae
- Genus: Tolidostena
- Species: T. fusei

Binomial name
- Tolidostena fusei Tokeji

Species of beetle

Tolidostena fusei is a beetle in the genus Tolidostena of the family Mordellidae. It was described by Tokeji.
