= Pinacodera punctigera =

Scientific classification
- Domain: Eukaryota
- Kingdom: Animalia
- Phylum: Arthropoda
- Class: Insecta
- Order: Coleoptera
- Suborder: Adephaga
- Family: Carabidae
- Tribe: Lebiini
- Subtribe: Cymindidina
- Genus: Pinacodera
- Species: P. punctigera

Binomial name
- Pinacodera punctigera (LeConte, 1851)

Synonyms
- Cymindis punctigera LeConte, 1851

Species of beetle

Pinacodera punctigera is a species in the beetle family Carabidae. It is found in the United States and Mexico.
