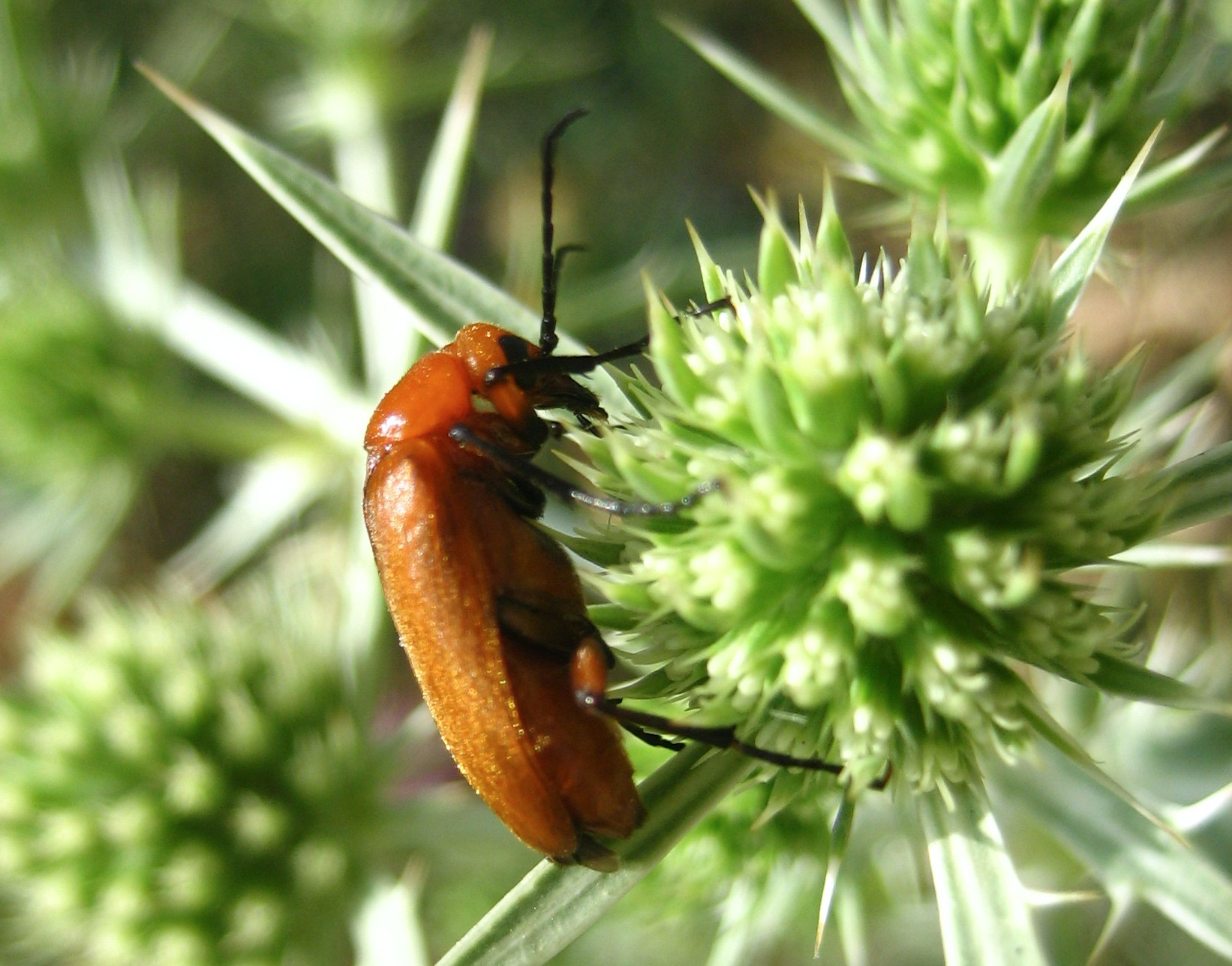
- Zonitis flava

Scientific classification
- Kingdom: Animalia
- Phylum: Arthropoda
- Class: Insecta
- Order: Coleoptera
- Suborder: Polyphaga
- Infraorder: Cucujiformia
- Family: Meloidae
- Genus: Zonitis; Fabricius, 1775

= Zonitis =

Genus of beetles

Zonitis is a genus of blister beetles in the family Meloidae. The genus was named and described by Johan Christian Fabricius in 1775.

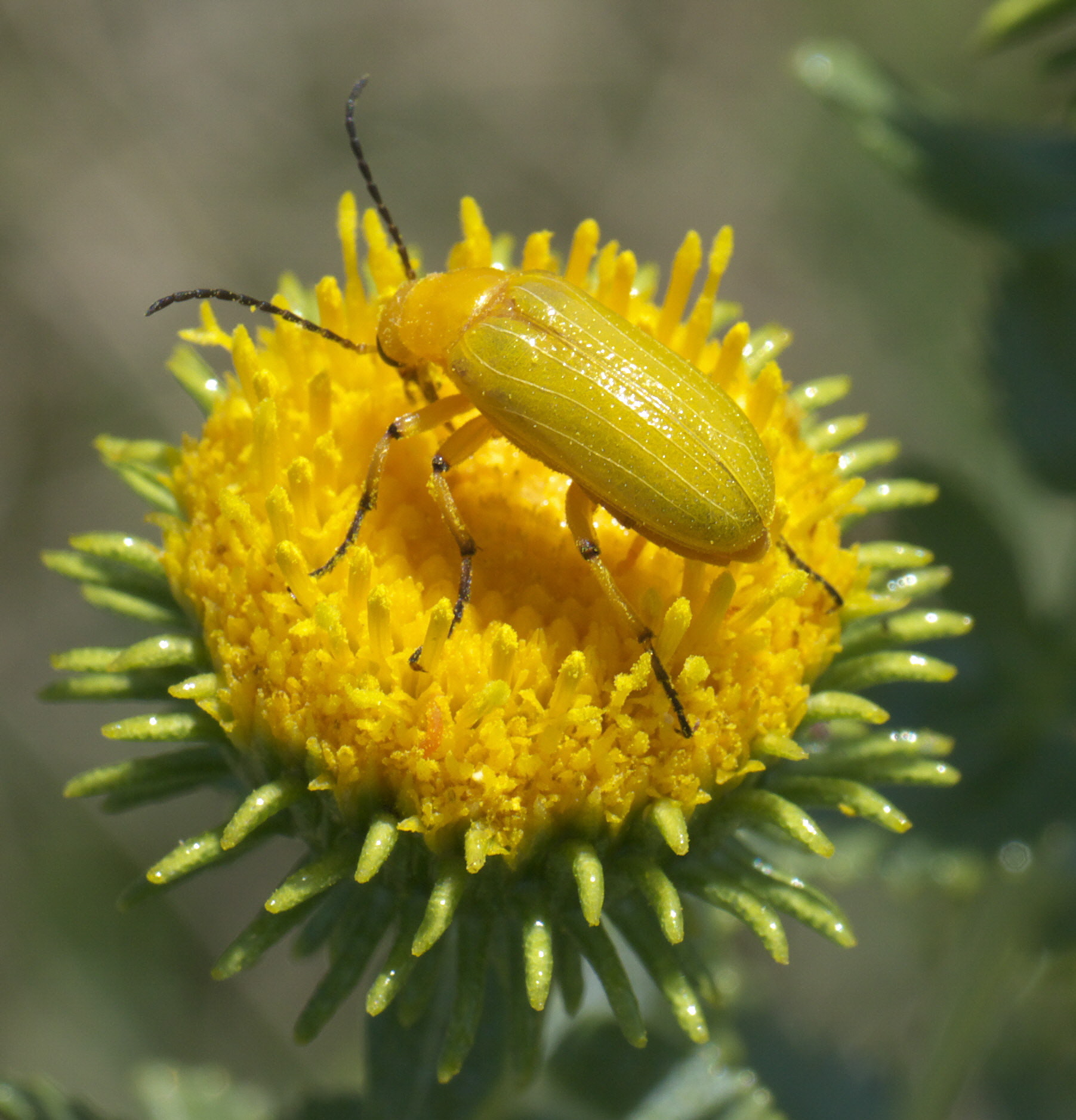
Zonitis sayi

== Species ==
According to EOL, GBIF, and Catalogue of Life.

- Zonitis abdominalis Laporte, 1840
- Zonitis abyssinica Fairmaire, 1882 - Abyssinian blister beetle
- Zonitis afghanica Kaszab, 1958 - Afghan blister beetle
- Zonitis andersoni Blackburn, 1889
- Zonitis angulata Fabricius, 1787
- Zonitis annulata MacLeay, 1872
- Zonitis apicalis MacLeay, 1872 - Bee-like blister beetle
- Zonitis aspericeps Blackburn, 1899
- Zonitis atriceps Fauvel, 1905
- Zonitis atripennis (Say, 1823)
- Zonitis atripes Wellman, 1910
- Zonitis aurea MacSwain, 1951
- Zonitis ballionis Escherich, 1892
- Zonitis batjanensis Pic, 1911
- Zonitis bellieri Reiche, 1860
- Zonitis bilineata Say, 1817
- Zonitis bipartita Fairmaire, 1879
- Zonitis bizonata MacLeay, 1872
- Zonitis bomiensis Tan, 1988
- Zonitis brevicornis Blackburn, 1889
- Zonitis bytinskii Kaszab, 1957
- Zonitis californica Wickham, 1905 - California blister beetle
- Zonitis chrysomeloides (Linnaeus, 1763)
- Zonitis costatipennis Pic, 1909
- Zonitis cothurnata Marseul, 1873
- Zonitis cowleyi Blackburn, 1889 - Cowley's blister beetle
- Zonitis cribricollis (LeConte, 1853)
- Zonitis cyanipennis Pascoe, 1862
- Zonitis cylindracea Fairmaire, 1880
- Zonitis dichroa Germar, 1848
- Zonitis dolichocera Wellman, 1910
- Zonitis downesi Pascoe, 1862 - Downes' blister beetle
- Zonitis dunniana Casey, 1891
- Zonitis erythrothorax Wellman, 1910
- Zonitis escherichi Semenov, 1893
- Zonitis ferganensis Pic, 1951 - Fergan blister beetle
- Zonitis fernancastroi Pardo Alcaide, 1950
- Zonitis flava Fabricius, 1775
- Zonitis flaviceps Waterhouse, 1875
- Zonitis flavicollis Dugès, 1881
- Zonitis flavicrus Fairmaire, 1879
- Zonitis flavida LeConte, 1853
- Zonitis flavipennis Péringuey, 1888
- Zonitis flohri Dugès, 1889 - Flohr's blister beetle
- Zonitis fogoensis Kaszab & Geisthardt, 1985 - Fogo/Cape Verdean blister beetle
- Zonitis fortuccii Fairmaire, 1887
- Zonitis fulviventris Beauregard, 1890
- Zonitis fuscicornis MacLeay, 1872
- Zonitis fuscimembris Fairmaire, 1886
- Zonitis genicularis Wellman, 1910
- Zonitis geniculata Fairmaire, 1887
- Zonitis glasunowi Semenov, 1893
- Zonitis gloriosa Blackburn, 1889
- Zonitis guerini Montrouz, 1860
- Zonitis hauseri Escherich, 1897
- Zonitis helmsi Blackburn, 1896 - Helms' blister beetle
- Zonitis henoni Fairmaire, 1893
- Zonitis hesperis Selander, 1952
- Zonitis holoxantha Fairmaire, 1887
- Zonitis immaculata (A. G. Olivier, 1789)
- Zonitis indigacea Fairmaire, 1880
- Zonitis interpretis Enns, 1956
- Zonitis iphigeniae Pliginskij, 1914
- Zonitis janthinipennis Fairmaire, 1880
- Zonitis japonicus Pic, 1910
- Zonitis javana Pic, 1911 - Java blister beetle
- Zonitis kozlowi Semenov, 1900
- Zonitis lateritia Champion, 1892
- Zonitis latreillei Laporte, 1840
- Zonitis limbipennis Fairmaire, 1880
- Zonitis longipalpis Blackburn, 1899
- Zonitis lutea MacLeay, 1872
- Zonitis macroxantha Fairmaire, 1887
- Zonitis marani Kaszab, 1965
- Zonitis marginiventris Fairmaire, 1887
- Zonitis melanarthra Fairmaire, 1894
- Zonitis melanocephala Tauscher, 1812
- Zonitis melanoptera Wellman, 1910
- Zonitis microcephala Escherich, 1897
- Zonitis minutissima Pinto, 2001
- Zonitis mitshkei Pic, 1911
- Zonitis miwai Kono, 1936
- Zonitis murrayi Blackburn, 1889 - Murray's blister beetle
- Zonitis nana Ragusa, 1881
- Zonitis natala Beauregard, 1890
- Zonitis neoguineensis Pic, 1911 - New Guinean (or Papuan) blister beetle
- Zonitis nigripectus Fairmaire, 1891
- Zonitis nigripennis Fauvel, 1905
- Zonitis nigritarsis (Stierlin, 1876)
- Zonitis nigriventris Motschulsky, 1872
- Zonitis nigroaenea Fairmaire, 1879
- Zonitis nigroapicata Fairmaire, 1880
- Zonitis nigromaculata Dugès, 1889
- Zonitis nigroplagiata Fairmaire, 1880
- Zonitis novercalis Escherich, 1891
- Zonitis obscuripes Fairmaire, 1879
- Zonitis opacorufa Fairmaire, 1880
- Zonitis pallicolor Fairmaire, 1880
- Zonitis pallidula Wellman, 1910
- Zonitis perforata Casey, 1891
- Zonitis ploribunda Wellman, 1910
- Zonitis posticalis Fairmaire, 1879
- Zonitis propinqua MacSwain, 1951
- Zonitis pseudopraeusta Kaszab, 1958
- Zonitis pulcherrima Pic, 1910
- Zonitis punctipennis (LeConte, 1880)
- Zonitis purpureipennis Waterhouse, 1875
- Zonitis queenslandica Blackburn, 1899 - Queensland (or Queenslandic) blister beetle
- Zonitis rostrata Blessig, 1861
- Zonitis ruficollis Frivaldszky, 1877
- Zonitis rugata Fairmaire, 1880
- Zonitis rugosipennis Fairmaire, 1879
- Zonitis rustica Blackburn, 1889
- Zonitis sayi Wickham, 1905
- Zonitis scutellaris Fairmaire, 1892
- Zonitis sedilloti Fairmaire, 1880
- Zonitis seminigra Fairmaire, 1879
- Zonitis semirubra Pic, 1911
- Zonitis semirufa Fairmaire, 1880
- Zonitis sexmaculata Ménétriés, 1832
- Zonitis sikkimensis Pic, 1910
- Zonitis sinensis Pic, 1935
- Zonitis splendida Fairmaire, 1879
- Zonitis stevewardi Pinto, 2001 - Steve Ward's blister beetle
- Zonitis straminea Fairmaire, 1894
- Zonitis strigata Wellman, 1910
- Zonitis subrugata Blackburn, 1899
- Zonitis sulcicollis Blatchley, 1910
- Zonitis superba Pic, 1910
- Zonitis surinamensis Pic, 1910 - Surinamese blister beetle
- Zonitis tarasca (Dugès, 1888)
- Zonitis tenebrosa Champion, 1892
- Zonitis tenuemarginata Fairmaire, 1887
- Zonitis tenuicornis Fairmaire, 1880
- Zonitis tricolor Le Guillou, 1844 - Three colored blister beetle
- Zonitis turkestanica Semenov, 1900 - Turkestani blister beetle
- Zonitis ventralis Fairmaire, 1880
- Zonitis vermiculata Schaeffer, 1905
- Zonitis violaceipennis Waterhouse, 1875
- Zonitis vittigera (LeConte, 1853)
- Zonitis xanthochroa Wellman, 1910
- Zonitis yorkensis Blackburn, 1899
