= Zonitis cribricollis =

Scientific classification
- Domain: Eukaryota
- Kingdom: Animalia
- Phylum: Arthropoda
- Class: Insecta
- Order: Coleoptera
- Suborder: Polyphaga
- Infraorder: Cucujiformia
- Family: Meloidae
- Genus: Zonitis
- Species: Z. cribricollis

Binomial name
- Zonitis cribricollis (LeConte, 1853)

Species of beetle

Zonitis cribricollis is a species of blister beetle in the family Meloidae. It is found in North America.
