= Gaurotes striatopunctata =

Scientific classification
- Kingdom: Animalia
- Phylum: Arthropoda
- Class: Insecta
- Order: Coleoptera
- Suborder: Polyphaga
- Infraorder: Cucujiformia
- Family: Cerambycidae
- Genus: Gaurotes
- Species: G. striatopunctata

Binomial name
- Gaurotes striatopunctata Wickham, 1914 †

Extinct species of beetle

Gaurotes striatopunctata is an extinct species of beetle in the family Cerambycidae. It was described by Wickham in 1914.
