= Tolidostena hayashii =

Scientific classification
- Domain: Eukaryota
- Kingdom: Animalia
- Phylum: Arthropoda
- Class: Insecta
- Order: Coleoptera
- Suborder: Polyphaga
- Infraorder: Cucujiformia
- Family: Mordellidae
- Genus: Tolidostena
- Species: T. hayashii

Binomial name
- Tolidostena hayashii (Kiyoyama, 1987)

Synonyms
- Mordellochroa hayashii Kiyoyama, 1987

Species of beetle

Tolidostena hayashii is a beetle in the genus Tolidostena of the family Mordellidae. It was described in 1987 by Kiyoyama.
