= Gaurotes fairmairei =

Scientific classification
- Kingdom: Animalia
- Phylum: Arthropoda
- Class: Insecta
- Order: Coleoptera
- Suborder: Polyphaga
- Infraorder: Cucujiformia
- Family: Cerambycidae
- Genus: Gaurotes
- Species: G. fairmairei

Binomial name
- Gaurotes fairmairei Aurivillius, 1912

Species of beetle

Gaurotes fairmairei is a species of beetle in the family Cerambycidae. It was described by Per Olof Christopher Aurivillius in 1912.
