= Pinacodera atrolucens =

Scientific classification
- Kingdom: Animalia
- Phylum: Arthropoda
- Class: Insecta
- Order: Coleoptera
- Suborder: Adephaga
- Family: Carabidae
- Subfamily: Lebiinae
- Tribe: Lebiini
- Subtribe: Cymindidina
- Genus: Pinacodera
- Species: P. atrolucens

Binomial name
- Pinacodera atrolucens (Casey, 1913)

Synonyms
- Cymindis atrolucens

Species of beetle

Pinacodera atrolucens is a species in the beetle family Carabidae. It is found in Mexico.
