= Tolidostena taiwana =

Scientific classification
- Kingdom: Animalia
- Phylum: Arthropoda
- Class: Insecta
- Order: Coleoptera
- Suborder: Polyphaga
- Infraorder: Cucujiformia
- Family: Mordellidae
- Genus: Tolidostena
- Species: T. taiwana

Binomial name
- Tolidostena taiwana (Kiyoyama, 1987)

Synonyms
- Mordellochroa taiwana Kiyoyama, 1987

Species of beetle

Tolidostena taiwana is a beetle in the genus Tolidostena of the family Mordellidae. It was described in 1987 by Kiyoyama.
