= Dahana cubana =

Scientific classification
- Kingdom: Animalia
- Phylum: Arthropoda
- Class: Insecta
- Order: Lepidoptera
- Superfamily: Noctuoidea
- Family: Erebidae
- Subfamily: Arctiinae
- Genus: Dahana
- Species: D. cubana

Binomial name
- Dahana cubana Schaus, 1904

Species of moth

Dahana cubana is a moth of the subfamily Arctiinae. It was described by Schaus in 1904. It is found on Cuba.
