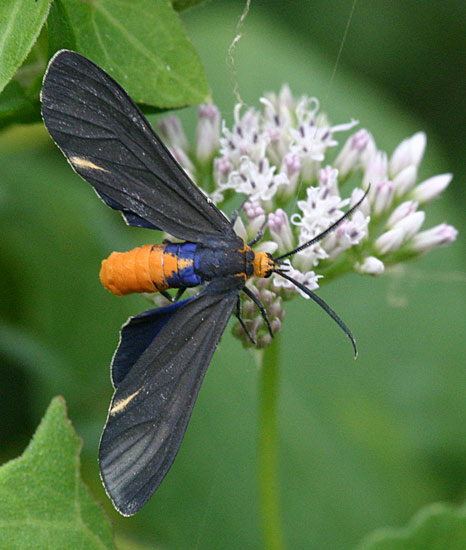

Scientific classification
- Domain: Eukaryota
- Kingdom: Animalia
- Phylum: Arthropoda
- Class: Insecta
- Order: Lepidoptera
- Superfamily: Noctuoidea
- Family: Erebidae
- Subfamily: Arctiinae
- Genus: Dahana; Grote, 1875

= Dahana (moth) =

Genus of moths

Dahana is a genus of moths in the family Erebidae erected by Augustus Radcliffe Grote in 1875.

== Species ==
- Dahana atripennis Grote, 1875
- Dahana cubana Schaus, 1904
