= Gaurotes adelph =

Scientific classification
- Kingdom: Animalia
- Phylum: Arthropoda
- Class: Insecta
- Order: Coleoptera
- Suborder: Polyphaga
- Infraorder: Cucujiformia
- Family: Cerambycidae
- Genus: Gaurotes
- Species: G. adelph

Binomial name
- Gaurotes adelph Ganglbauer, 1889

Species of beetle

Gaurotes adelph is a species of beetle in the family Cerambycidae. It was described by Ludwig Ganglbauer in 1889.
