= Pinacodera limbata =

Scientific classification
- Kingdom: Animalia
- Phylum: Arthropoda
- Class: Insecta
- Order: Coleoptera
- Suborder: Adephaga
- Family: Carabidae
- Subfamily: Lebiinae
- Tribe: Lebiini
- Subtribe: Cymindidina
- Genus: Pinacodera
- Species: P. limbata

Binomial name
- Pinacodera limbata (Dejean, 1831)

Synonyms
- Cymindis limbata

Species of beetle

Pinacodera limbata is a species in the beetle family Carabidae. It is found in the United States and Canada.
