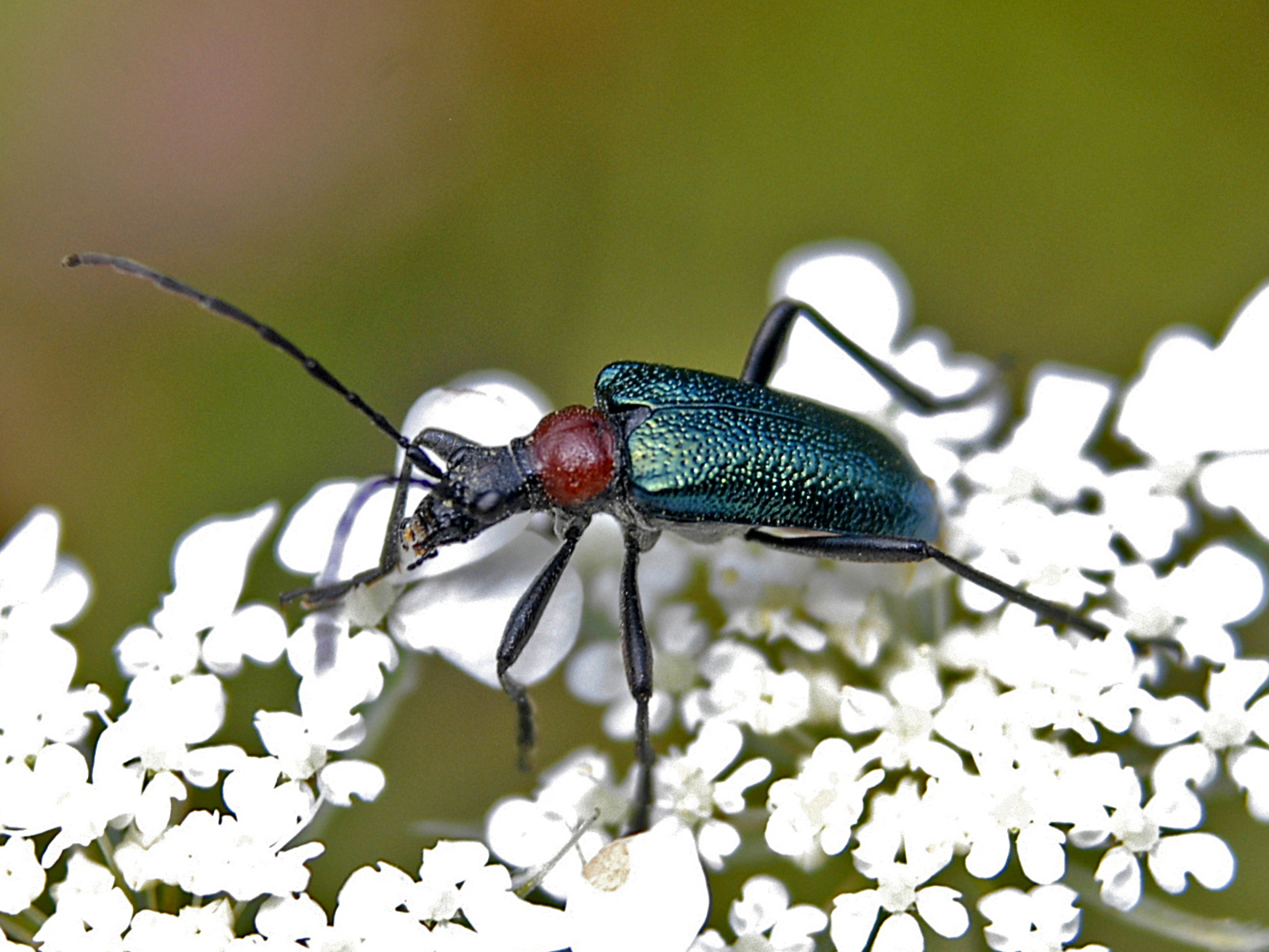
- Gaurotes virginea

Scientific classification
- Kingdom: Animalia
- Phylum: Arthropoda
- Class: Insecta
- Order: Coleoptera
- Suborder: Polyphaga
- Infraorder: Cucujiformia
- Family: Cerambycidae
- Subfamily: Lepturinae
- Genus: Gaurotes; LeConte, 1850

= Gaurotes =

Genus of beetles

Gaurotes is a genus of beetles in the family Cerambycidae, containing the following species:

Subgenus Carilia Mulsant, 1863

- Gaurotes adelph a Ganglbauer, 1889
- Gaurotes atricornis Pu, 1992
- Gaurotes atripennis Matsushita, 1933
- Gaurotes filiola Holzschuh, 1998
- Gaurotes flavimarginata Pu, 1992
- Gaurotes glabratula Holzschuh, 1998
- Gaurotes glabricollis Pu, 1992
- Gaurotes otome Ohbayashi, 1959
- Gaurotes pictiventris Pesarini & Sabbadini, 1997
- Gaurotes piligera Pu, 1992
- Gaurotes tibetana Podaný, 1962
- Gaurotes virginea (Linnaeus, 1758)

Subgenus Gaurotes LeConte, 1850

- Gaurotes cyanipennis (Say, 1824)
- Gaurotes striatopunctata Wickham, 1914 †
- Gaurotes thoracica (Haldeman, 1847)

Subgenus Paragaurotes Plavilshchikov, 1921

- Gaurotes doris Bates, 1884
- Gaurotes ussuriensis Blessig, 1873, Siberia

Gaurotes incertae sedis

- Gaurotes aeneovirens Holzschuh, 1993
- Gaurotes cuprifera Holzschuh, 1993
- Gaurotes fairmairei Aurivillius, 1912
- Gaurotes latiuscula Holzschuh, 1993
- Gaurotes lucidivirens Holzschuh, 1998
- Gaurotes perforata Holzschuh, 1993
- Gaurotes spinipennis Pu, 1992
- Gaurotes tuberculicollis (Blanchard, 1871)
