= Pinacodera =

Scientific classification
- Domain: Eukaryota
- Kingdom: Animalia
- Phylum: Arthropoda
- Class: Insecta
- Order: Coleoptera
- Suborder: Adephaga
- Family: Carabidae
- Subfamily: Lebiinae
- Tribe: Lebiini
- Subtribe: Cymindidina
- Genus: Pinacodera; Schaum, 1857

Genus of beetles

Pinacodera is a genus in the beetle family Carabidae. There are more than 20 described species in Pinacodera, found in North, Central, and South America.

== Species ==
These 22 species belong to the genus Pinacodera:

- Pinacodera abbreviata Casey, 1920 (the United States)
- Pinacodera ampliata Casey, 1920 (the United States)
- Pinacodera atripennis Casey, 1920 (the United States)
- Pinacodera atrolucens (Casey, 1913) (Mexico)
- Pinacodera basipunctata Chaudoir, 1875 (Guatemala and Mexico)
- Pinacodera blanda (Casey, 1913) (the United States)
- Pinacodera chalcea Bates, 1883 (Guatemala)
- Pinacodera chevrolati (Dejean, 1836) (Mexico)
- Pinacodera complanata (Dejean, 1826) (the United States)
- Pinacodera cribrata Chaudoir, 1875 (Guatemala and Mexico)
- Pinacodera laevior Bates, 1891
- Pinacodera latiuscula Chaudoir, 1875 (Mexico)
- Pinacodera limbata (Dejean, 1831) (the United States and Canada)
- Pinacodera obscura Casey, 1920 (the United States)
- Pinacodera platicollis (Say, 1823) (the United States and Canada)
- Pinacodera punctifera (LeConte, 1884) (the United States)
- Pinacodera punctigera (LeConte, 1851) (the United States and Mexico)
- Pinacodera ruficornis Bates, 1891
- Pinacodera rufostigma (Hunting, 2013) (the United States)
- Pinacodera semisulcata G.Horn, 1881 (Mexico)
- Pinacodera subcarinata Casey, 1920 (the United States)
- Pinacodera sulcipennis G.Horn, 1881 (Mexico)
