= Tolidostena tarsalis =

Scientific classification
- Kingdom: Animalia
- Phylum: Arthropoda
- Class: Insecta
- Order: Coleoptera
- Suborder: Polyphaga
- Infraorder: Cucujiformia
- Family: Mordellidae
- Genus: Tolidostena
- Species: T. tarsalis

Binomial name
- Tolidostena tarsalis Ermisch, 1942

Species of beetle

Tolidostena tarsalis is a beetle in the genus Tolidostena of the family Mordellidae. It was described in 1942 by Ermisch.
