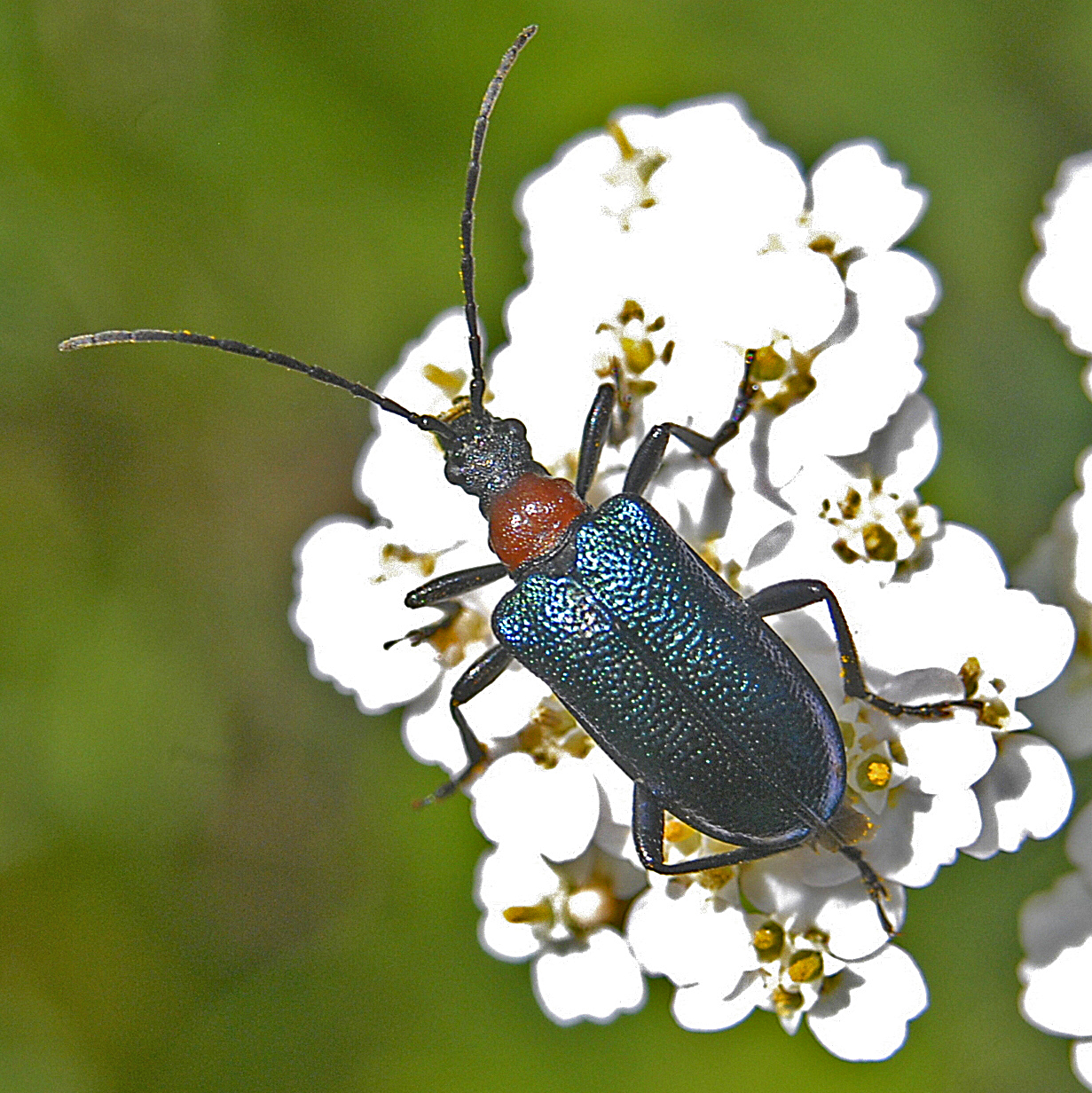
- Gaurotes virginea thalassina

Scientific classification
- Kingdom: Animalia
- Phylum: Arthropoda
- Class: Insecta
- Order: Coleoptera
- Suborder: Polyphaga
- Infraorder: Cucujiformia
- Family: Cerambycidae
- Genus: Gaurotes
- Species: G. virginea

Binomial name
- Gaurotes virginea (Linnaeus, 1758)

Synonyms
- Carilia virginea (Linnaeus) Villiers, 1978; Leptura virginea Linnaeus, 1758; Pachyta virginea (Linnaeus) Küster, 1846; Gaurotes virgineum (Linnaeus) (misspelling); Gaurotes virgineus (Linnaeus) (misspelling)

= Gaurotes virginea =

Species of beetle

Gaurotes virginea is a species of the Lepturinae subfamily in the long-horned beetle family.

== Distribution and habitat ==
This beetle is distributed in most of Europe (Austria, Belgium, Czech Republic, France, Germany, Italy, Luxembourg, Norway, Poland, Romania, Slovakia, Slovenia, Sweden, Switzerland) and in the eastern Palearctic realm (Russia, Kazakhstan, China, Mongolia, and Korea). They inhabit spruce forests. They are very common and frequent along the alpine arc.

== Description ==
Gaurotes virginea has a body length of 7–13 millimetres (0.28–0.51 in). These beetles are quite robust, elytra are bright blue with a metallic sheen. Pronotum is black, reddish or black with rusty spots. The abdomen is usually reddish, but some subspecies are characterized by a totally black prothorax and black abdomen.

This species is rather similar to Dinoptera collaris, but G. virginea is bright blue with strong metallic reflections while D. collaris is bright black without metallic reflections. Moreover, the first species shows an obtuse tooth on the sides of the prothorax, while in the second the sides of the prothorax are rounded.

== Biology ==
The life cycle of these beetles lasts two years. Larvae are oligophagous wood borers in coniferous trees, they live under the bark and mainly feed on Scots pine (Pinus sylvestris), Norway spruce (Picea abies), Abies and Larix species. Adult beetles can be found from May to August. Adult beetles feed on pollen of various flowers, especially on Heracleum sphondylium.

== Gallery ==
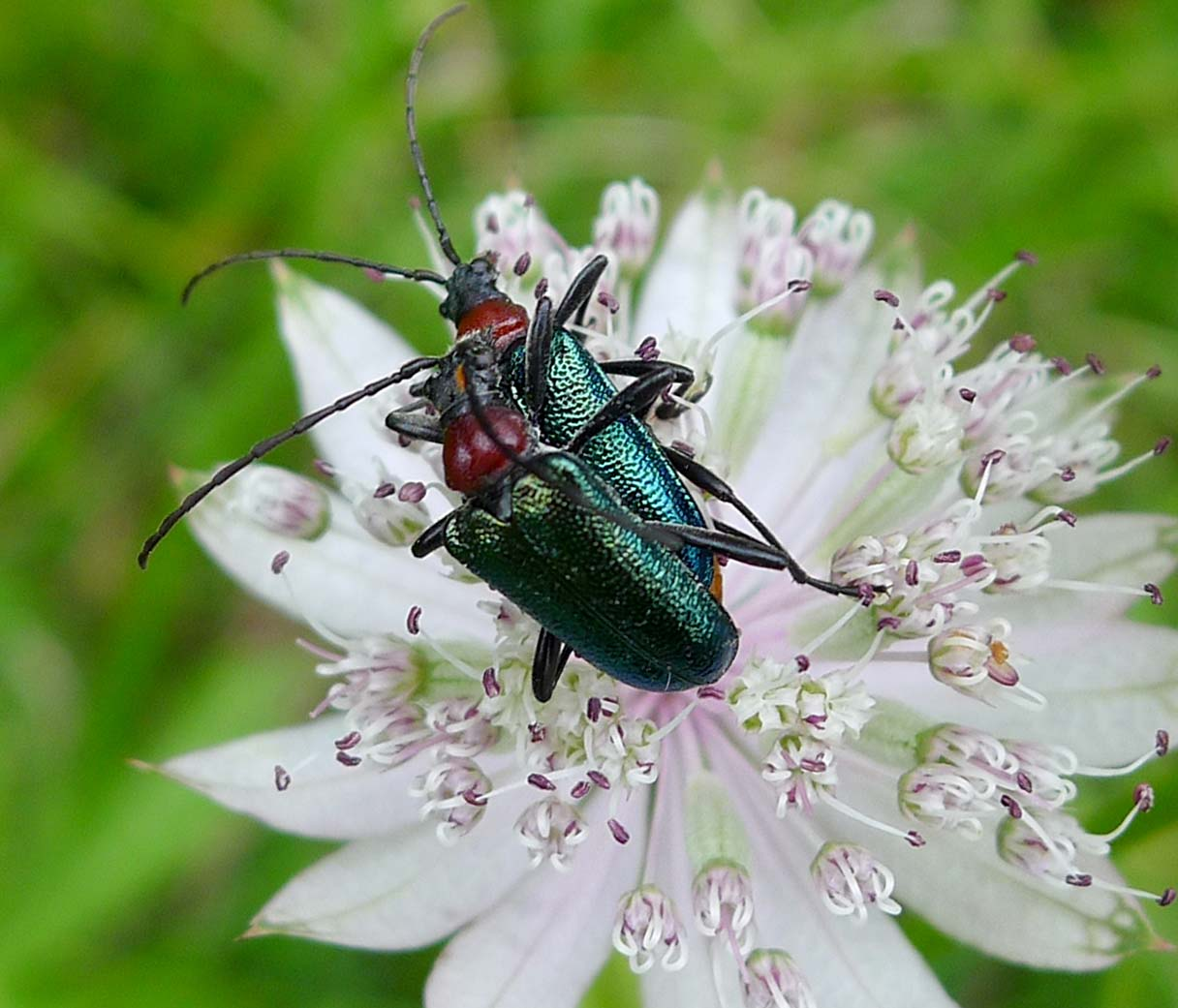
Mating

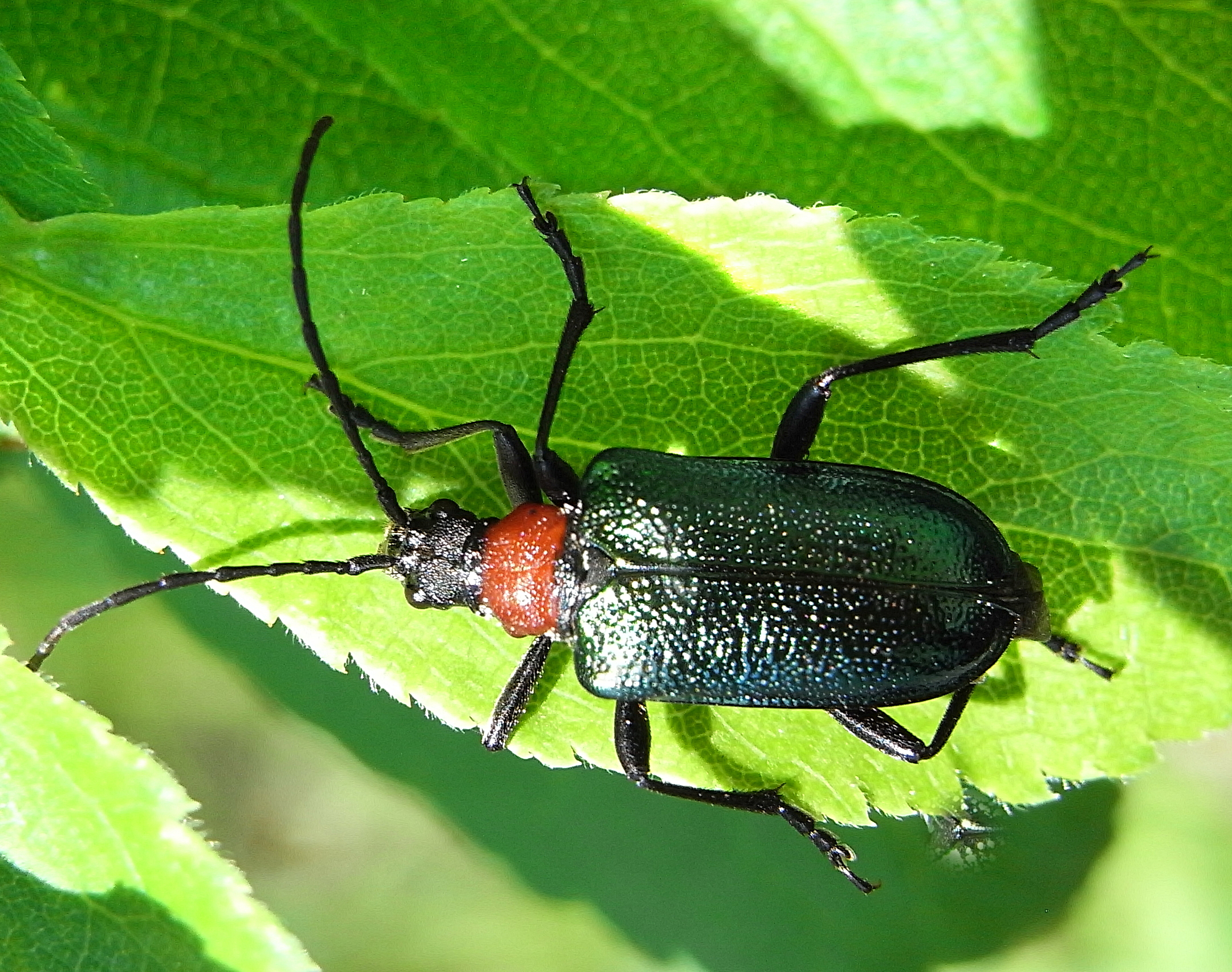
Upperside view

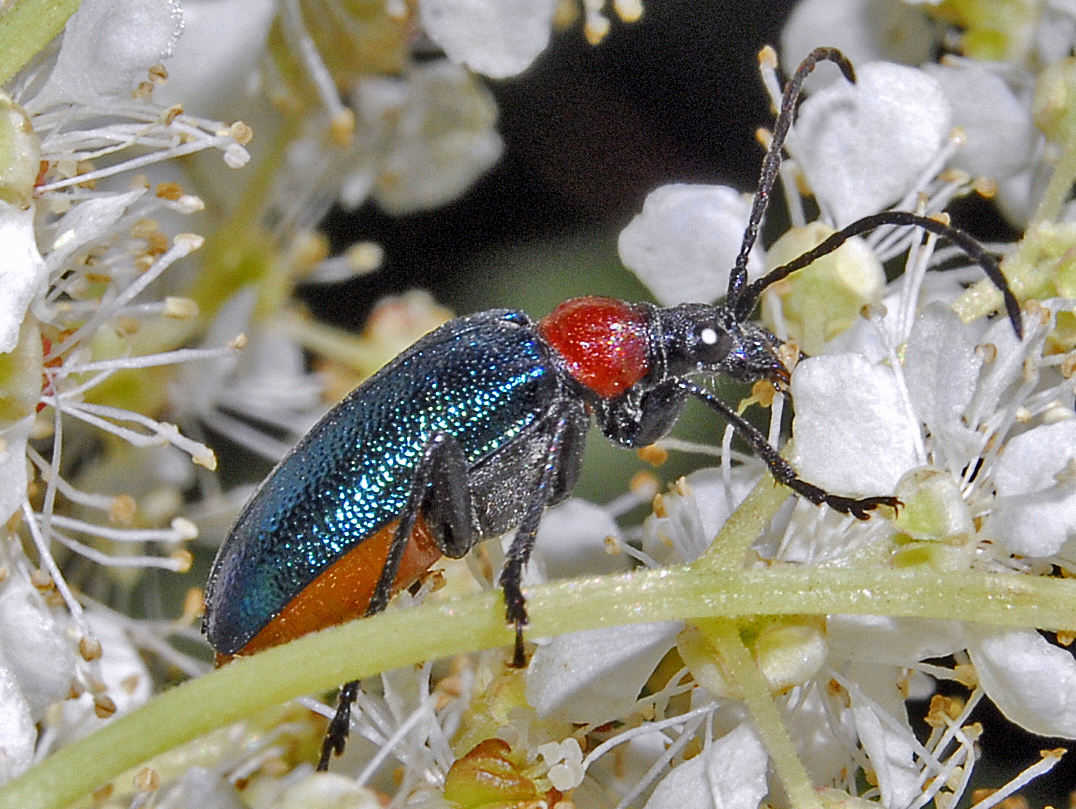
Side view

Clip
