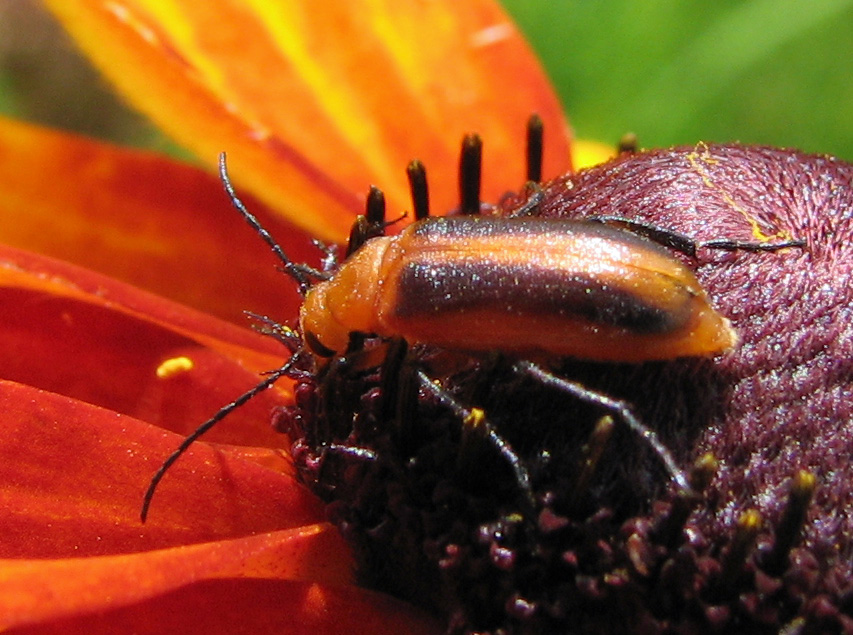

Scientific classification
- Domain: Eukaryota
- Kingdom: Animalia
- Phylum: Arthropoda
- Class: Insecta
- Order: Coleoptera
- Suborder: Polyphaga
- Infraorder: Cucujiformia
- Family: Meloidae
- Genus: Zonitis
- Species: Z. vittigera

Binomial name
- Zonitis vittigera (LeConte, 1853)

= Zonitis vittigera =

Species of beetle

Zonitis vittigera, the brown blister beetle, is a species of blister beetle in the family Meloidae. It is found in North America.

== Subspecies ==
These two subspecies belong to the species Zonitis vittigera:

- Zonitis vittigera propinqua MacSwain, 1951
- Zonitis vittigera vittigera (LeConte, 1853)
