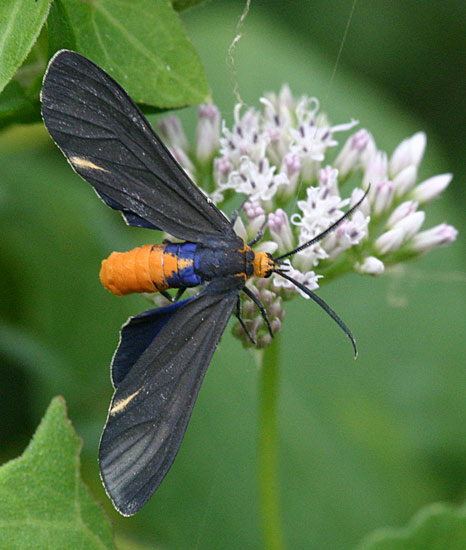

Scientific classification
- Kingdom: Animalia
- Phylum: Arthropoda
- Class: Insecta
- Order: Lepidoptera
- Superfamily: Noctuoidea
- Family: Erebidae
- Subfamily: Arctiinae
- Genus: Dahana
- Species: D. atripennis

Binomial name
- Dahana atripennis Grote, 1875

= Dahana atripennis =

Species of moth

Dahana atripennis, the black-winged dahana, is a species of moth of the subfamily Arctiinae. The species was first described by Augustus Radcliffe Grote in 1875. It is found in the US states of Florida and Georgia.

The wingspan is 33–40 mm. Adults are on wing year round in Florida.

The larvae feed on Tillandsia usneoides.
