= Tolidostena japonica =

Scientific classification
- Domain: Eukaryota
- Kingdom: Animalia
- Phylum: Arthropoda
- Class: Insecta
- Order: Coleoptera
- Suborder: Polyphaga
- Infraorder: Cucujiformia
- Family: Mordellidae
- Genus: Tolidostena
- Species: T. japonica

Binomial name
- Tolidostena japonica (Tokeji, 1953)

Synonyms
- Mordellochroa japonica Tokeji, 1953

Species of beetle

Tolidostena japonica is a beetle in the genus Tolidostena of the family Mordellidae. It was described in 1953 by Tokeji.

== Subspecies ==
- Tolidostena japonica fusei (Tokeji, 1953)
- Tolidostena japonica japonica (Tokeji, 1953)
