= Gaurotes atripennis =

Scientific classification
- Kingdom: Animalia
- Phylum: Arthropoda
- Class: Insecta
- Order: Coleoptera
- Suborder: Polyphaga
- Infraorder: Cucujiformia
- Family: Cerambycidae
- Genus: Gaurotes
- Species: G. atripennis

Binomial name
- Gaurotes atripennis Matsushita, 1933

Species of beetle

Gaurotes atripennis is a species of beetle in the family Cerambycidae. It was described by Matsushita in 1933.
