= Zonitis atripennis =

Scientific classification
- Domain: Eukaryota
- Kingdom: Animalia
- Phylum: Arthropoda
- Class: Insecta
- Order: Coleoptera
- Suborder: Polyphaga
- Infraorder: Cucujiformia
- Family: Meloidae
- Genus: Zonitis
- Species: Z. atripennis

Binomial name
- Zonitis atripennis (Say, 1823)

Species of beetle

Zonitis atripennis is a species of blister beetle in the family Meloidae. It is found in North America. Adults feed on plants from the genus Cleome, while larvae live in nests of various bee species.

== Subspecies ==
These two subspecies belong to the species Zonitis atripennis:

- Zonitis atripennis atripennis (Say, 1823)
- Zonitis atripennis terminalis Enns, 1956
