= Tolidostena similator =

Scientific classification
- Domain: Eukaryota
- Kingdom: Animalia
- Phylum: Arthropoda
- Class: Insecta
- Order: Coleoptera
- Suborder: Polyphaga
- Infraorder: Cucujiformia
- Family: Mordellidae
- Genus: Tolidostena
- Species: T. similator

Binomial name
- Tolidostena similator Kiyoyama, 1991

Species of beetle

Tolidostena similator is a beetle in the genus Tolidostena of the family Mordellidae. It was described in 1991 by Kiyoyama.
