= Tolidostena =

Scientific classification
- Domain: Eukaryota
- Kingdom: Animalia
- Phylum: Arthropoda
- Class: Insecta
- Order: Coleoptera
- Suborder: Polyphaga
- Infraorder: Cucujiformia
- Family: Mordellidae
- Subfamily: Mordellinae
- Tribe: Mordellistenini
- Genus: Tolidostena; Ermisch, 1942

Synonyms
- Neotolidostena Kiyoyama, 1991

Genus of beetles

Tolidostena is a genus of tumbling flower beetles in the family Mordellidae. There are about six described species in Tolidostena, found in temperate Asia.

== Species ==
These species belong to the genus Tolidostena:

- Tolidostena atripennis Nakane, 1956
- Tolidostena hayashii Kiyoyama, 1991
- Tolidostena montana Kiyoyama, 1991
- Tolidostena similator Kiyoyama, 1991
- Tolidostena taiwana (Kiyoyama, 1987)
- Tolidostena japonica (Tokeji, 1953)
